= List of ship names of the Royal Navy (R–T) =

This is a list of Royal Navy ship names starting with R, S, and T.

== R ==
- R1
- R2
- R3
- R4
- R7
- R8
- R9
- R10
- R11
- R12
- Raby Castle
- Racehorse
- Racer
- Rachel
- Rackham
- Racoon
- Radiant
- Radstock
- Raglan
- Raider
- Rainbow
- Raisonnable
- Rajah
- Rajputana
- Raleigh
- Rambler
- Ramillies
- Rampisham
- Ramsey
- Ranchi
- Ranee
- Ranelagh
- Ranger
- Ranpura
- Rapid
- Rapide
- Raposa
- Rattle
- Rattler
- Rattlesnake
- Ravager
- Raven
- Raven II
- Rawalpindi
- Rayleigh Castle
- Reading
- Ready
- Reaper
- Rebecca
- Reclaim
- Recovery
- Recruit
- Red Lion
- Redbreast
- Redbridge
- Redcar
- Redgauntlet
- Redmill
- Redoubt
- Redoubtable
- Redpole
- Reedham
- Regent
- Regulus
- Reindeer
- Relentless
- Reliance
- Renard
- Renascent
- Rendlesham
- Renegade
- Renommee
- Renonculus
- Renown
- Republican
- Repulse
- Research
- Reserve
- Resistance
- Resolue
- Resolute
- Resolution
- Resource
- Restoration
- Restless
- Retalick
- Retribution
- Retriever
- Reunion
- Revenge
- Révolutionnaire
- Reward
- Reyna
- Reynard
- Rhin
- Rhododendron
- Rhona
- Rhyl
- Ribble
- Richmond
- Rifleman
- Rigorous
- Rinaldo
- Ringarooma
- Ringdove
- Riou
- Ripley
- Riplingham
- Rippon
- Rippon's Prize
- Rising Castle
- Riviera
- Rivoli
- Rob Roy
- Roberts
- Robin
- Robust
- Roc
- Rochester
- Rochester Prize
- Rochfort
- Rocket
- Rockingham
- Rockrose
- Rocksand
- Rockwood
- Rodney
- Roebuck
- Roebuck II
- Roedean
- Rolla
- Rolls Royce
- Roman
- Romney
- Romola
- Romula
- Romulus
- Rook
- Rooke
- Rorqual
- Rosalind
- Rosamund
- Rosario
- Rosaura
- Rose
- Rosebay
- Rosebush
- Rosemary
- Ross
- Rother
- Rotherham
- Rothesay
- Rover
- Rowena
- Rowley
- Roxborough
- Roxburgh
- Royal Adelaide
- Royal Albert
- Royal Alfred
- Royal Anne
- Royal Anne Galley
- Royal Arthur
- Royal Charles
- Royal Charlotte
- Royal Eagle
- Royal George
- Royal James
- Royal Katherine
- Royal Marine
- Royal Oak
- Royal Prince
- Royal Scotsman
- Royal Sovereign
- Royal Ulsterman
- Royal William
- Royalist
- Ruby
- Ruby Prize
- Rugby
- Ruler
- Rupert
- Rupert's Prize
- Rushen Castle
- Russell
- Rutherford
- Rye
- Ryde

== S ==
- S1
- S2
- S3
- S6
- S7
- S8
- S9
- Sabine
- Sable
- Sabre
- Sabrina
- Sacrett
- Safari
- Safeguard
- Safety
- Saga
- Sahib
- Saint Christopher
- Saint Lucia
- Saint Patrick
- Saint Pierre
- Saladin
- Salamine
- Salamander
- Saldanha
- Salisbury
- Salmon
- Saltash
- Salveda
- Salvia
- Salvonia
- Samarang
- Samphire
- Sampson
- Samson
- San Antonio
- San Domingo
- San Josef
- San Juan
- San Miguel
- San Nicolas
- Sandfly
- Sandown
- Sandwich
- Sanguine
- Sans Pareil
- Santa Dorothea
- Santa Margarita
- Santa Maria
- Santa Monica
- Sapphire
- Sapphire II
- Sapphire's Prize
- Sappho
- Saracen
- Sarawak
- Sardine
- Sardonyx
- Sarkoy
- Sarpedon
- Sartine
- Satellite
- Saturn
- Satyr
- Saumarez
- Savage
- Saxifrage
- Saxlingham
- Scarab
- Scarborough
- Sceptre
- Scimitar
- Scipio
- Scipion
- Scorcher
- Scorpion
- Scotsman
- Scotstoun
- Scott
- Scourge
- Scout
- Scylla
- Scythe
- Scythian
- Sea Devil
- Sea Nymph
- Sea Rider
- Sea Rover
- Sea Scout
- Seabear
- Seadog
- Seafire
- Seaflower
- Seaford
- Seaforth
- Seagull
- Seahawk
- Seahorse
- Seal
- Sealark
- Sealion
- Seamew
- Searcher
- Seawolf
- Security
- Seine
- Selby
- Selene
- Selkirk
- Senator
- Senegal
- Seneschal
- Sennen
- Sentinel
- Sepoy
- Seraph
- Serapis
- Serene
- Seringapatam
- Serpent
- Sesame
- Sesostris
- Setter
- Seven Sisters
- Seven Stars
- Sevenoaks
- Severn
- Seychelles
- Seymour
- Shah
- Shakespeare
- Shalford
- Shalimar
- Shamrock
- Shannon
- Shark
- Sharke
- Sharpshooter
- Shearwater
- Sheerness
- Sheffield
- Sheldrake
- Shelanagig
- Shemara
- Shepperton
- Shikari
- Shipham
- Shoreham
- Shoreham Prize
- Shrewsbury
- Shrewsbury Castle
- Shrivenham
- Shropshire
- Sibyl
- Sickle
- Sidlesham
- Sidon
- Sikh
- Silvio
- Simbang
- Simoom
- Simoon
- Sir Andrew Mitchell
- Sir Edward Hughes
- Sir Francis Drake
- Sir Galahad
- Sir Henry Lawrence
- Sir John Moore
- Sir Thomas Picton
- Sirdar
- Siren
- Sirene
- Sirius
- Siskin
- Skate
- Skilful
- Skipjack
- Skirmisher
- Skylark
- Sladen
- Slaney
- Sleuth
- Sligo
- Slinger
- Slothany
- Sluys
- Smilax
- Smiter
- Snaefell
- Snake
- Snap
- Snapdragon
- Snapper
- Snipe
- Snowberry
- Snowdrop
- Snowflake
- Snowshoe
- Sobieski
- Solebay
- Solent
- Solitaire
- Somali
- Somaliland
- Somerset
- Somme
- Sophia
- Sophie
- Sorceress
- Southampton
- Southdown
- Southern Prince
- Southsea Castle
- Southwold
- Sovereign
- Sovereign of the Seas
- Spanker
- Sparham
- Spark
- Sparkler
- Sparrow
- Sparrowhawk
- Spartan
- Spartiate
- Speaker
- Speaker's Prize
- Spear
- Spearfish
- Spearhead
- Speedwell
- Speedwell Prize
- Speedy
- Spence
- Spencer
- Spenser
- Spey
- Sphinx
- Sphynx
- Spider
- Spikenard
- Spindrift
- Spiraea
- Spirit
- Spiteful
- Spitfire
- Splendid
- Sportive
- Sportsman
- Spragee
- Sprightly
- Springbank
- Springbok
- Springer
- Spur
- Spy
- Squirrel
- St Albans
- St Albans Prize
- St Andrew
- St Anne
- St Apollo
- St Austell Bay
- St Brides Bay
- St Christopher
- St Christopher's
- St David
- St Erth
- St Fermin
- St Fiorenzo
- St Florentine
- St George
- St. Helena
- St. Helier
- St Jacob
- St James
- St Jean d'Acre
- St John
- St John Prize
- St Joseph
- St. Kitts
- St Lawrence
- St Lucia
- St Mary
- St. Mary's
- St Michael
- St Vincent
- St. Zeno
- Stag
- Stalker
- Stalwart
- Standard
- Stanley
- Star
- Starr
- Starfish
- Starling
- Start Bay
- Starwort
- Stately
- Statesman
- Statice
- Staunch
- Stayner
- Steadfast
- Steady
- Stedham
- Sterlet
- Sterling
- Stevenstone
- Stirling Castle
- Stockham
- Stoic
- Stonecrop
- Stonehenge
- Stork
- Storm
- Stormcloud
- Stour
- Strafford
- Stratagem
- Strathella
- Strenuous
- Striker
- Stromboli
- Strombolo
- Strongbow
- Stronghold
- Stuart
- Stubborn
- Stubbington
- Sturdy
- Sturgeon
- Stygian
- Styx
- Subtle
- Success
- Success Hulk
- Suffolk
- Sulham
- Sulphur
- Sultan
- Sultana
- Sunderland
- Sundew
- Sunfish
- Sunflower
- Sun Prize
- Superb
- Superbe
- Superieure
- Supply
- Supreme
- Surf
- Surinam
- Surly
- Surprise
- Surprize
- Surveillante
- Sussex
- Sutherland
- Sutlej
- Suva
- Swaggerer
- Swale
- Swallow
- Swallow Prize
- Swan
- Swann
- Sweetbriar
- Swift
- Swiftsure
- Swindon
- Swinger
- Swordfish
- Swordsman
- Sybille
- Sycamore
- Syeren
- Sylph
- Sylvia
- Syren
- Syrtis

== T ==
- Tabard
- Taciturn
- Tactician
- Taff
- Taiaroa
- Tain
- Taku
- Talavera
- Talbot
- Talent
- Talisman
- Tally-Ho
- Talybont
- Tamar
- Tamarisk
- Tamworth Castle
- Tanatside
- Tancred
- Tang
- Tanganyika
- Tantalus
- Tantivy
- Tapageur
- Tapir
- Tara
- Tarlton
- Tarn
- Tarpon
- Tartan
- Tartar
- Tartar's Prize
- Tartarus
- Tasman
- Tasmania
- Tattoo
- Taunton
- Tauranga
- Taurus
- Tavistock
- Tavy
- Tay
- Tay and Tyne
- Teazer
- Tedworth
- Tees
- Telegraph
- Telemachus
- Teme
- Temeraire
- Tempest
- Templar
- Temple
- Tenacious
- Tenacity
- Tenby
- Tenedos
- Teredo
- Termagant
- Tern
- Terpsichore
- Terrapin
- Terrible
- Terror
- Test
- Tetcott
- Tetrarch
- Teviot
- Teviot Bank
- Thais
- Thakeham
- Thalia
- Thames
- Thane
- Thanet
- Thatcham
- Theban
- The Hinde
- Theodocia
- Thermopylae
- Theseus
- Thetis
- Thisbe
- Thistle
- Thor
- Thorn
- Thornborough
- Thornham
- Thorough
- Thracian
- Thrasher
- Thrush
- Thruster
- Thule
- Thunder
- Thunderbolt
- Thunderer
- Thyme
- Tiara
- Tibenham
- Tickler
- Tiger
- Tiger Bay
- Tiger Prize
- Tiger Snake
- Tiger Whelp
- Tigre
- Tigress
- Tigris
- Tilbury
- Tintagel
- Tintagel Castle
- Tipperary
- Tiptoe
- Tirade
- Tireless
- Titania
- Tithonus
- Tiverton
- Tobago
- Tobruk
- Token
- Tomahawk
- Tonbridge
- Tonbridge Castle
- Tongham
- Tonnant
- Toowoomba
- Topaze
- Torbay
- Torch
- Toreador
- Tormentor
- Tornado
- Toronto
- Torquay
- Torrent
- Torrid
- Torride
- Torridge
- Torrington
- Tortoise
- Tortola
- Totem
- Totland
- Totnes
- Tourmaline
- Tourterelle
- Toutou
- Tower
- Towey
- Towser
- Towy
- Towzer
- Tracker
- Tradewind
- Trafalgar
- Trailer
- Tralee
- Transfer
- Transit
- Transporter
- Transylvania
- Trave
- Traveller
- Tredagh
- Trelandvean
- Trelawney
- Tremadoc Bay
- Tremendous
- Trenchant
- Trent
- Trepassey
- Tresham
- Trespasser
- Triad
- Trial
- Tribune
- Tricord
- Trident
- Trillium
- Trimmer
- Trincomalee
- Trinculo
- Trinidad
- Tristram
- Triton
- Triumph
- Trojan
- Trollope
- Tromp
- Trompeuse
- Tronda
- Trooper
- Trouncer
- Troubridge
- Truant
- Truculent
- Truelove
- Trump
- Trumpeter
- Truncheon
- Truro
- Trustful
- Trusty
- Tryall
- Trydent
- Tryphon
- Tryton
- Tryton Prize
- Tudor
- Tulip
- Tumult
- Tuna
- Turbulent
- Turpin
- Turquoise
- Tuscan
- Tutankhamen
- Tweed
- Twickenham
- Tyger
- Tyler
- Tyne
- Tynedale
- Tynwald
- Tyrant
- Tyrian

== See also ==
- List of aircraft carriers of the Royal Navy
- List of amphibious warfare ships of the Royal Navy
- List of battlecruisers of the Royal Navy
- List of pre-dreadnought battleships of the Royal Navy
- List of dreadnought battleships of the Royal Navy
- List of cruiser classes of the Royal Navy
- List of destroyer classes of the Royal Navy
- List of patrol vessels of the Royal Navy
- List of frigate classes of the Royal Navy
- List of mine countermeasure vessels of the Royal Navy (includes minesweepers and mine hunters)
- List of monitors of the Royal Navy
- List of Royal Fleet Auxiliary ship names
- List of Royal Navy shore establishments
- List of submarines of the Royal Navy
- List of survey vessels of the Royal Navy
