= HMS Snap =

There have been five ships named HMS Snap in the Royal Navy:

- HMS Snap (1808), a 16-gun brig-sloop, formerly the French brig Palinure, captured in 1808 and broken up in 1811.
- HMS Snap (1812), a 12-gun gun-brig launched in 1812, converted to a survey ship in 1823 and a powder hulk in 1827. Sold in 1832.
- HMS Snap (1856), a transport, the former slaver Caicque, captured in 1847 and sold in 1848.
- HMS Snap (1881), a wooden Dapper-class gunboat launched in 1855, sold in 1868 to Japan and renamed Kaku Ten Kan.
- HMS Snap (1872), an Ant-class gunboat launched in 1872 and sold in 1909.

== See also ==
- HMS Snapdragon
- HMS Snapper
