= Snowdrop (disambiguation) =

The snowdrop is a small genus of about 20 species in the family Amaryllidaceae that are among the first bulbs to bloom in spring.

Snowdrop may also refer to:

== Arts and entertainment ==
- Snowdrop (game engine), developed by Massive Entertainment
- The Snow-Drop, a monthly girls' magazine founded by Eliza Lanesford Cushing
- Snow Drop (manhwa)
- Snowdrops (novel), Booker-nominated debut novel by AD Miller
- Snowdrop (South Korean TV series)
- Snowdrop, for trombone, violin, and piano by Christian Wolff, 1970
- "Snow Drop" (song), a song by L'Arc-en-Ciel
- Snowdrop (sculpture), a sculpture by Per Hasselberg

== Ships ==
- MV Snowdrop, a Mersey Ferry
- USS Snowdrop (1863), a Union Navy ship
- HMS Snowdrop, the name of two ships of the Royal Navy

== Other uses ==
- A British nickname for members of the United States Army Military Police corps, during the Second World War (referring to their white cap or helmet, white gaiters, white gloves etc.)
- The Snowdrop Campaign and Snowdrop Petition, calls for a ban on handguns in Scotland, set up in response to the Dunblane massacre

== See also ==
- The Snowdrop Festival, 1984 Czechoslovak comedy film
