= Sweet briar =

Sweet briar or Sweetbriar, may refer to:

== Buildings ==
- Sweet Briar (Geneseo, New York), a historic farm house
- Sweetbriar Hall, a 15th-century mansion in Nantwich, Cheshire, England
- Sweetbriar, a late 18th-century mansion in Philadelphia, Pennsylvania

== Other uses ==
- Sweetbriar (horse), a racehorse
- Bebe Sweetbriar (born 1962), American drag singer and activist
- HMS Sweetbriar, several ships of the Royal Navy
- Rosa rubiginosa, the sweetbriar rose
- Sweet Briar, Virginia, an unincorporated community
- Sweet Briar College, a liberal arts women's college in Sweet Briar, Virginia
