= Snapdragon (disambiguation) =

Snapdragon, or Antirrhinum, is a genus of plants.

Snapdragon or Snap-dragon may also refer to:

- HMS Snapdragon, several ships belonging to UK's Royal Navy
- Qualcomm Snapdragon, a hardware platform and series of system on chips (SoCs) developed by Qualcomm for mobile devices
- Snap-dragon (game), a parlour game
- Snapdragon (comics), a Japanese supervillain in the Marvel Comics Universe
- Snapdragon double, a call made during the bidding phase of contract bridge
- Snapdragon (film), a 1993 American thriller film by Worth Keeter
- SnapDragon Games, a game developer for Nintendo platforms
- Snapdragon (graphic novel), a 2020 graphic novel by Kat Leyh
- Snapdragon (Morituri), a Strikeforce character in Marvel comics
- Snapdragon Stadium, an American football stadium in San Diego, California sponsored by Qualcomm
- Snapdragon (Transformers), a character from the Transformers series
- The Snapdragons, an independent British rock band
- Maurandya scandens, a plant also called snapdragon vine
- SnapDragon, a cultivar of apple developed by Cornell University
