= Silvio (disambiguation) =

Silvio is a masculine given name.

Silvio may also refer to:

- "Silvio" (song), a 1988 song by Bob Dylan from his album Down in the Groove
- Silvio (horse), winner of the 1877 Epsom Derby
- HMS Silvio, two Royal Navy ships
- Silvio's Pizza, a franchise in Australia, later rebranded Domino's Pizza Enterprises or Domino's
