= Rattler (disambiguation) =

A rattler is a member in a group of venomous snakes.

Rattler or rattlers may also refer to:

== Arts and entertainment ==
- Rattler (character), a fictional character from the Marvel Comics Universe
- Rattler (periodical), published by the Bus Preservation Society of Western Australia
- Rattlers (film), a 1976 horror film
- "The Rattler", a song by Scottish rock band Goodbye Mr. Mackenzie
- Iron Rattler, a wooden roller coaster at Six Flags Fiesta Texas in San Antonio, Texas formerly known as The Rattler
- Rattlers are a type of Coin slab used in coin grading

== Sports ==
- Arizona Rattlers, a professional indoor football team based in Phoenix, Arizona
- Dallas Rattlers, a Major League Lacrosse team based in Dallas, Texas
- Florida A&M Rattlers and Lady Rattlers, the sports teams of Florida A&M University
- Bradford Rattlers, a Canadian Junior ice hockey team based out of Bradford, Ontario
- St. Mary's Rattlers, the sports teams of St. Mary's University, Texas

== People ==
- Spencer Rattler (born 2000), American football player

== Other uses ==
- HMS Rattler, several vessels of the Royal Navy
