= Reliance (ship) =

Several ships have been named Reliance:

- Reliance (1804 ship) was built in France in 1790 and was registered in 1804 at Bristol. She left Bristol on a voyage as a slave ship but her crew scuttled her in June before having embarked any slaves.
- Reliance (1815 ship) was launched at Coringa. She sailed east of the Cape of Good Hope until c.1827 when she sailed to England and assumed British registry. Once in Britain she sailed back and forth to Bengal under a license from the British East India Company (EIC). She also twice transported military convicts to New South Wales. In 1832 Bennett sent Reliance on a whaling voyage to the Pacific. After she returned she sailed on a second whaling voyage, but this time to the Indian Ocean where she wrecked at the end of 1836.
- Reliance (1827 ship) was launched on the Thames as an East Indiaman for the British East India Company (EIC). She made three voyages for the EIC before she was sold when the EIC exited its trading activities. She was inward bound to London from China when she wrecked in 1842 in a gale near Boulogne.
- Reliance (1831 ship) was built at Bristol. She wrecked at Rockaway, in March 1836 as she sailed from Bristol to New York City.

== See also ==
- HMS Reliance
- USS Reliance (1860)
