= Sandrock =

Sandrock or Sand rock may refer to:

- Sand Rock, Alabama, a town in the United States
- Sand Rock Peak (California), a mountain in the United States
- Sandrock Formation, a geological formation in England
- Adele Sandrock (1863–1937), German-Dutch actress
- Helmut Sandrock (born 1956), German football administrator
- My Time at Sandrock, a 2023 video game by Pathea

== See also ==
- Sandstone
- Beachrock
- HMS Rocksand, several ships
- Rock Sand, a British racehorse
