= Thisbe (disambiguation) =

Thisbe is a character from Greek mythology in the story of Pyramus and Thisbe.

Thisbe may also refer to:

- Thisbe (Boeotia), a town of ancient Boeotia
- Thisbe (nymph), another character from Greek mythology
- Thisvi, a Greek town called Thisbe in ancient times
- 88 Thisbe, one of the largest main belt asteroids
- Thisbe Lindhorst (born 1962), German biochemist
- Thisbe Nissen (born 1972), American author
- Tishbe, the birthplace of the prophet Elijah
- HMS Thisbe, the name of four Royal Navy warships
- Thisbe (butterfly), a genus of metalmark butterflies in the tribe Nymphidiini, subtribe Lemoniadina
