= Sussex (disambiguation) =

Sussex is a historic county in South East England, taking its name from the Kingdom of Sussex in early Anglo-Saxon England. It is now divided into the ceremonial counties of East Sussex and West Sussex.

== Animals ==
- Sussex (chicken), a dual purpose breed created in England
- Sussex cattle, a red breed from the Sussex Weald in England
- Sussex Spaniel, a breed of dog developed in England
- Sussex, a breed of rabbit

== Places ==
=== United Kingdom ===
- Kingdom of Sussex
  - History of Sussex, general history of Sussex, England
- Sussex, English county
- Sussex (UK Parliament constituency), 1290–1832
- Sussex County Cricket Club, an English first-class county cricket club
- University of Sussex, an English campus university situated in East Sussex

=== Australia ===
- Sussex County, Western Australia

=== Canada ===
- Sussex, New Brunswick
- Sussex Parish, New Brunswick
- Sussex Drive a major street in Ottawa, Ontario

=== United States ===
- Sussex County, Delaware
- Sussex, New Jersey
- Sussex County, New Jersey
- Sussex County, Virginia
- Sussex, Wisconsin
- Sussex, Wyoming

== Ships ==
- HMS Sussex, the name of various English warships and the Royal Naval Reserve unit based in Portslade until 1994
- SS Sussex, a passenger ferry built for the London, Brighton and South Coast Railway in 1896. Sold to France in 1914, sold to Greece in 1920 and renamed.
  - Sussex pledge, a pledge given by Germany in 1916 prompted by the torpedoing of the passenger ferry Sussex
- Sussex, an East Indiaman ship

== Titles ==
- Duke of Sussex, a peerage title held by Prince Harry, and Duchess of Sussex, a peerage title held by Meghan Markle, wife of Prince Harry
- Earl of Sussex, a formal title created several times in the Peerages of England, Great Britain, and the United Kingdom

== Other uses ==
- Sussex Records, a former record label in Hollywood
- Sussex Stakes, Group 1 flat horse race in the United Kingdom
- Sussex Publishers, a magazine publisher based in New York City that produces Psychology Today
