= Seamew =

Sea mew or seamew may refer to:

- Black-legged kittiwake
- Common gull, also called sea mew
- Supermarine Seamew, an amphibian seaplane
- Short Seamew, an anti-submarine aircraft
- Curtiss SO3C Seamew, a World War II floatplane
- HMS Seamew, two ships of the Royal Navy

== See also ==
- SEA-ME-WE 3 (cable system), a telecommunications cable
