= HMS Strafford =

HMS Strafford is the name of the following Royal Navy ships:

- HMS Strafford (1714)
- HMS Strafford (1735)

== See also ==
- Strafford (disambiguation)
