= HMS Surly =

Four ships of the Royal Navy have been named Surly:

- HMS Surly (1806), a Cheerful-class cutter launched in 1806 and sold in 1837
- HMS Surly (1855), a mortar vessel launched in 1855, renamed MV.9 later that year, and broken up in 1863
- HMS Surly (1856), an Albacore-class gunboat launched in 1856 and sold in 1869
- HMS Surly (1894), a Rocket-class destroyer launched in 1894 and sold in 1920
