= HMS Scipion =

Two ships of the British Royal Navy have borne the name HMS Scipion, after the French term for the Roman general Scipio Africanus:

- HMS Scipion (1793) a 74-gun third rate, previously the French Téméraire-class ship of the line Scipion. She was handed over to the British in 1793, and was burnt by accident later that year.
- HMS Scipion was the French 74-gun third rate Scipion, which the British captured in 1805; she was broken up in 1819.

== See also ==
- Ships named HMS Scipio
