= French brig Serpent (1807) =

French navy brig of the Palinure class

History

France
- Name: Rivoli
- Ordered: 19 July 1806
- Builder: Louis & Michel-Louis Crucy, Paimbboeuf (Nantes)
- Laid down: September 1806
- Launched: 30 October 1807
- Renamed: Serpent
- Captured: 1808

United Kingdom
- Name: HMS Pert
- Acquired: 1808 by capture
- Renamed: HMS Asp
- Honours and awards: Naval General Service Medal with clasp "Guadaloupe"
- Fate: Sold 1814

United Kingdom
- Name: Asp
- Owner: 1815: John Bell & Co.; 1822:Samuel Enderby & Sons
- Acquired: 1815 by purchase
- Fate: Wrecked 1828

General characteristics
- Class & type: Curieux-class brig
- Displacement: 158/290 (unladen/laden) tons (French)
- Tons burthen: 334, or 345, or 346(bm)
- Length: 88 ft 8 1/2 in (27.0 m) (overall); 78 ft 7 1/2 in (24.0 m) (keel)
- Beam: 28 ft 3 1/8 in (8.6 m)
- Depth of hold: 8 ft 0 in (2.4 m)
- Sail plan: Brig
- Complement: French Navy:94; Royal Navy:100; Whaler=36
- Armament: French Navy: 14 × 24-pounder carronades + + 2 × 6-pounder chase guns; Royal Navy:14 × 24-pounder carronades + 2 × 6-pounder chase guns; Whaler:12 × 9&12-pounder guns

Serpent was a French navy brig of the Palinure class, launched in 1807 at Paimbeouf (Nantes) as Rivolli, but renamed. HMS Acasta captured her in 1808 in the Caribbean and the British Royal Navy took her into service there as HMS Pert but renamed her Asp. The navy disposed of her in 1814. She then made five voyages as a whaler, and wrecked in December 1828 on her sixth voyage.

== French service and capture ==
Lieutenant de vaisseau Paul de Lamanon sailed Serpent from Paimboeuf carrying troops to Senegal. He then conducted missions to Cayenne and Venezuela.

HMS Acasta captured Serpent on 17 July 1808 off La Guaira, Venezuela. Serpent was armed with sixteen 24-pounder carronades and two long 6-pounder guns, and had a crew of 104 men. British records name the commander as enseigne de vaisseau Mons. Lamanon. (Note: A first-class share of the prize money was worth £276 3s 1d; a sixth-class share, such as would accrue to an ordinary seaman, was worth £2 12s 10½d.)

== Royal Navy service ==
The Royal Navy commissioned her as 16-gun sloop and Rear-Admiral the Honourable Sir Alexander Cochrane provisionally named her Pert. Commander Robert Preston took command in August 1808. As there was already a brig HMS Pert, the Admiralty named her HMS Asp.

On 8 February 1809 Asp and Superieure sighted Junon passing close to the Virgin Islands. Junon ignored their orders that she halt and prepare to be boarded.

The British frigate Horatio brought Junon to action and she surrendered when the frigate Latona and the brig Driver arrived on the scene and joined the engagement. Junon was carrying some sugar and cargo, which resulted in prize money (over and above that for the vessel itself) for all five British captors (i.e., including Asp).

In January -February 1810 Asp was also at the invasion of Guadeloupe. (Note: A first-class share of the prize money for Guadaloupe was worth £113 3s 1¼d; a sixth-class share, that of an ordinary seaman, was worth £1 9s 1¼d.) This campaign led to the award in 1847 of the clasp "Guadaloupe" to the Naval General Service Medal to all surviving claimants from the invasion.

Commander William M'Culloch replaced Preston after the invasion. Then in May Commander Henry Nathaniel Rowe replaced M'Culloch. Rowe sailed Asp back to Britain with dispatches, and M'Culloch replaced Rowe in command of Saint Christopher.

Asp arrived at Portsmouth on 30 July 1810 and was paid off and laid up. She spent much of that time in Ordinary.

Disposal: The "Principal Officers and Commissioners of His Majesty's Navy" offered the "Asp sloop, of 333 tons", for sale at Portsmouth on 16 March 1814. She sold on that day for £1,050.

== Whaler ==
John Bell & Co. purchased Asp to employ her as a South Seas whaler and appointed Captain J. Kenney master. Captain John Kenney received a letter of marque against America on 27 July 1814.

Whaling voyage #1: Captain Kenney sailed Asp on 23 August 1814, bound for the coast of Peru. On 20 October she was at 1°15′S 28°30′W. At some point in 1815 she was on the coast of Peru with 680 barrels. She left the Galapagos on 15 March, and called at St Catherine's (Florianópolis) after transiting Cape Horn. She returned on 6 August 1816 with 460 casks of oil.

Whaling voyage #2: Captain Kenney sailed on 8 October 1816 for the Pacific Ocean. She was reported to have been "on-the-line" on 24 November 1816 "all well". She returned on 27 August 1818 with 480 casks of oil.

Whaling voyage #3: Captain Kenney sailed on 15 December 1818 bound for the Galapagos. Asp was there in February 1820. She returned on 14 August 1821 with 2110 casks.

Whaling voyage #4: By this time Bell & Co. had sold Asp to Samuel Enderby & Sons. Captain William Darby Brind sailed from Britain on 17 July 1822 bound for New Zealand. On 20 December 1823 she was at the Bay of Islands with 1200 barrels. Under Captain Phillip Tapsell she then undertook whaling during the winter right whaling season at Great Oyster Bay (Tasmania). There she took four whales. She left New Zealand on 10 January 1825 and returned home on 26 May with 760 casks, including some black oil.

Whaling voyage #5: Captain House left Britain on 2 August 1825 bound for the Seychelles. She stopped at Mauritius in December 1825, or 1826. She returned to Britain on 21 September 1827 with 700 casks.

== Fate ==
Asp, Kenneck (or Kenneth, or Renneck, or Rennick), master, sailed from Britain on 16 November 1827 with destination the Indian Ocean. She was wrecked on the Mudge Rocks, Madagascar, on 17 December 1828. The crew was rescued.
