= HMS Tortoise =

HMS Tortoise may refer to:

- Grenville (1764 EIC ship)
- Sir Edward Hughes (1784 EIC ship)
