= HMS Spindrift =

HMS Spindrift is the name of the following Royal Navy ships:

- HMS Spindrift (1918)
- HMS Spindrift (1940)

== See also ==
- Spindrift (disambiguation)
