= HMS Restoration =

HMS Restoration has been the name of three Royal Navy ships, named after the English Restoration.

- HMS Restoration (1678), third rate, 70 guns, built Betts, Harwich 1678; Rebuilt 1702; wrecked in the Great Storm of 1703.
- HMS Restoration (1706), third rate, 70 guns. Wrecked in 1711.
- HMS Restoration (1779), corvette, 20 guns. Formerly Oliver Cromwell of the Connecticut State Navy, captured, refitted, and commissioned by the British in 1779.
