= HMS Snipe =

Six ships of the Royal Navy have been named HMS Snipe:

- HMS Snipe (1801) was a 12-gun gun-brig launched in 1801 and broken up in 1846.
- HMS Snipe (1828) was a cutter launched in 1828 and broken up in 1860.
- HMS Snipe (1860) was a Philomel-class gunvessel launched in 1860 and broken up in 1868.
- HMS Snipe (1874) was a Coastguard vessel launched in 1874 which foundered in 1914.
- HMS Snipe (1898) was a river gunboat launched in 1898 and sold in 1919
- HMS Snipe (U20) was a Black Swan-class sloop launched in 1945 and scrapped in 1960
