= HMS Shoreham =

Five ships of the Royal Navy have borne the name HMS Shoreham after the port town of Shoreham-by-Sea in Sussex:

- HMS Shoreham (1694) was a 32-gun fifth rate launched in 1694. She was rebuilt as a 20-gun sixth rate in 1720, and was sold in 1744.
- HMS Shoreham (1744) was a 24-gun sixth rate launched in 1744 and sold in 1758.
- HMS Shoreham was to have been a Hunt-class minesweeper, but she was renamed whilst under construction and launched as HMS Salford in 1919.
- HMS Shoreham (L32) was a Shoreham-class sloop launched in 1930. She was sold into mercantile service in 1946 and renamed Jorge Fel Joven. She was broken up in 1950.
- HMS Shoreham (M112) is a Sandown-class minehunter, she was launched in 2001 and decommissioned from Royal Navy in 2022 and transferred to Ukrainian Navy. She was renamed Cherkasy (Ukrainian: Черкаси) and is currently in service.

== See also ==
- HMS Shoreham Prize
