= HMS Seal =

Three vessels of the Royal Navy have been named HMS Seal:

- HMS Seal (1897), an Earnest-class destroyer launched in 1897. She served in World War I and was sold in 1921.
- HMS Seal (N37), a Grampus-class mine-laying submarine launched in 1938. In World War II she was captured and commissioned into the Kriegsmarine as UB.
- HMS Seal (5000) was a recovery and support craft launched in 1967, originally belonging to the Royal Air Force, transferred briefly to the RN in 1991, and transferred again to the Royal Maritime Auxiliary Service the same year.
