= HMS Sylvia =

HMS Sylvia has been the name of five ships of the British Royal Navy, and may refer to:

- HMS Sylvia (1806), an Adonis-class 10-gun schooner launched in 1806 and sold in 1816. She became a merchantman and was wrecked c. end-1823.
- HMS Sylvia (1827), a 6-gun cutter launched in 1827, converted to a survey vessel in 1842, and sold in 1859.
- HMS Sylvia (1866), a wood screw sloop of four guns, launched in 1866, completed as a survey vessel, and sold in 1889.
- HMS Sylvia (1897), a destroyer launched in 1897 and sold in 1919.
- HMS Sylvia (J382), an Algerine-class minesweeper launched in 1944 and sold for breaking up in 1958.
