= HMS Saumarez =

Two ships of the Royal Navy have borne the name HMS Saumarez, after Admiral James Saumarez, 1st Baron de Saumarez:

- HMS Saumarez (1916) was a Parker-class flotilla leader launched in 1916 and sold in 1931.
- HMS Saumarez (G12) was an S-class destroyer launched in 1942 and sold in 1950.
