= HMS Speaker =

List of ships with the same or similar names

One ship of the Commonwealth of England has borne the name Speaker, and one Royal Navy ship has borne the name HMS Speaker:

- English ship Speaker (1650), a 50-gun Speaker-class frigate launched in 1650, renamed HMS Mary in 1660, rebuilt in 1688 and wrecked in 1703.
- HMS Speaker (D90), a Bogue-class escort carrier launched in 1943 and sold for scrap in 1972.
