= HMS Tavistock =

HMS Tavistock may refer to:

- HMS Tavistock (1745), a 14-gun sloop-of-war launched in 1745, renamed HMS Albany in 1747 and sold in 1763
- HMS Tavistock (1747), a 50-gun fourth rate in service between 1747 and 1752, and then as a hulk between 1758 and 1760
