= HMS Slinger =

HMS Slinger has been the name of several Royal Navy vessels:

- HMS Slinger (1917), an aircraft catapult vessel purchased 1917 and sold 1919
- HMS Slinger (D26), built as USS Chatham, on Lend-Lease from 1942 to 1946
- HMS LST 3510, launched 1944 was named Slinger from 1947 to 1956
