= HMS Tenacious =

Two ships of the Royal Navy have borne the name HMS Tenacious:

- HMS Tenacious (1917) was an R-class destroyer launched in 1917 and sold in 1928.
- HMS Tenacious (R45) was a T-class destroyer launched in 1943. She was converted into a Type 16 frigate between 1951 and 1952 and was scrapped in 1965.
