= HMS Star =

Twelve ships of the Royal Navy have borne the name HMS Star or HMS Starr:

- HMS Starr (1643) was a 16-gun ship purchased in 1643 and sold in 1652.
- HMS Starr (1667) was a 4-gun fireship purchased in 1667 and expended that year.
- HMS Starr (1694) was an 8-gun bomb vessel launched in 1694 and purchased that year. She was wrecked in 1712.
- HMS Star (1779) was a 14-gun sloop purchased in 1779 and sold circa 1785.
- HMS Star (1795) was an Albatross-class brig-sloop that the Admiralty sold in 1802.
- HMS Starr (1805) was an 18-gun sloop launched in 1805. She was converted to an 8-gun bomb vessel in 1812 and was renamed HMS Meteor. She was sold in 1816.
- HMS Star was a 14-gun brig launched in 1813 as HMS Lord Melville (or HMS Melville). She was renamed HMS Star in 1814 and was sold in 1837.
- HMS Star (1808) was a tender launched in 1808 and sold in 1828.
- HMS Star (1835) was a packet brig launched in 1835. She was transferred to the Coastguard as a watchvessel in 1857 and was renamed WV 11 in 1863. She was broken up around 1899.
- HMS Star (1860) was a wood screw sloop launched in 1860 and broken up in 1877.
- HMS Star (1896) was a Star-class destroyer, later categorised as the C class. She was launched in 1896 and sold in 1919.

== See also ==
- HMS Starfish
- HMCS Star, a Canadian Forces Naval Reserve division in Hamilton, Ontario

== Battle Honours ==
- Dover 1652
- Martinique 1809
- Guadeloupe 1810
