= HMS Rothesay =

Two ships of the Royal Navy have been named HMS Rothesay, after the town of Rothesay in Scotland.

- HMS Rothesay (J19) was a Bangor-class minesweeper launched in 1941 and broken up in 1950.
- HMS Rothesay (F107) was a Rothesay-class frigate launched in 1957 and scrapped in 1988.
