= HMS Telegraph =

At least two vessels in the service of the Royal Navy have borne the name Telegraph.

- HM hired brig Telegraph (1798), was a 14-gun brig that was launched in 1798 and participated in 1799 in an engagement that earned the crew a Naval General Service Medal. She and her entire crew were lost at sea in 1801.
- HMS Telegraph (1813), was the former American privateer Vengeance, captured in 1813 and wrecked in 1817 with the loss of one man.
