= HMS Sprightly =

At least seven ships of the Royal Navy have borne the name HMS Sprightly:

- HMS Sprightly (1777) was a 12 gun cutter built in Dover in August 1777, that sank 23 December 1777 off Guernsey
- HMS Sprightly (1778) was a 10-gun cutter that the French ship Cassard captured in the Mediterranean Sea in 1801, and subsequently scuttled.
- HMS Sprightly (1805) was the hired armed cutter Lively, launched in 1805, that served the Royal Navy in August 1805. The Navy purchased her in 1805 and renamed her. As Sprightly she served until she was broke up in 1815.
- HMS Sprightly (1818) was a 6-gun Nightingale-class cutter built for the Royal Navy. Wrecked off the Isle of Portland in 1821.
- HMS Sprightly (1823) was a paddle tug
- HMS Sprightly (1837) was a tender in service 1837–1869, formerly a Post Office packet ship built in 1823.
- HMS Sprightly (1900) was a B-class torpedo boat destroyer, launched in 1900 and scrapped in 1920
- HMS Sprightly (P268) was an S-class submarine, ordered in 1943 but cancelled because of the end of World War II

== See also ==
- HMAS Sprightly, Royal Australian Navy tugboat
- HM Revenue Cutter Sprightly, which wrecked on the Isle of Portland on 8 January 1821
