= HMS Shrewsbury =

Three ships of the Royal Navy have borne the name HMS Shrewsbury, after the English town of Shrewsbury:

- HMS Shrewsbury (1695) was an 80-gun second rate launched in 1695. She was rebuilt in 1713 and broken up in 1749.
- HMS Shrewsbury (1758) was a 74-gun third rate launched in 1758. She was condemned in 1783 and scuttled that year.
- HMS Shrewsbury (1918) was a Hunt-class minesweeper launched in 1918 and sold in 1927.

There was also HMS Shrewsbury Castle (K374), a Castle-class corvette launched in 1943. She was loaned to the Royal Norwegian Navy and renamed HNoMS Tunsberg Castle in 1944 and was sunk that year by a mine.
