= HMS Taurus =

Two ships of the Royal Navy have borne the name HMS Taurus, after the Greek for bull.

- HMS Taurus (1917) was an R-class destroyer, launched in 1917. She served in the First World War and was broken up in 1920.
- HMS Taurus (P339) was a T-class submarine, launched in 1942. She served in the Second World War and survived it. She was transferred to the Royal Netherlands Navy as Dolfijn in 1948, and returned to the Royal Navy in 1953 and broken up in 1960.
