= HMS Teviot =

Two ships of the Royal Navy have been named HMS Teviot:

- HMS Teviot (1903) was a River-class destroyer launched in 1903 and sold for scrap in 1919
- HMS Teviot (K222) was a River-class frigate launched in 1942 and transferred to South Africa as HMSAS Teviot in 1945. Returned to the Royal Navy in 1946 and scrapped in 1955
