= HMS Sea Nymph =

Two ships of the Royal Navy have borne the name HMS Sea Nymph:

- HMS Sea Nymph (1782) was an 8-gun cutter in service in 1782.
- HMS Sea Nymph (P223) was an S-class submarine launched in 1942 and scrapped in 1948.
