= HMS Rover =

Seven ships of the Royal Navy have been named HMS Rover:

- HMS Rover (1779) was a 16-gun sloop, formerly the American Cumberland. The British captured her in 1779, only to lose her temporarily to the French in 1780, before they recaptured her in 1781; she was wrecked later that year.
- HMS Rover (1796) was a 16-gun sloop launched built in Bermuda in 1796 along with HMS Hunter (1796) and wrecked in 1798.
- HMS Rover (1808) was a Royal Navy Cruizer-class brig-sloop laid down in 1804 but not launched until 1808. She served in the North Sea, off the north coast of Spain, in the Channel, and on the North American station. She captured two letters-of-marque and numerous merchant vessels before being laid-up in 1815. She then sat unused until she was sold in 1828. She became a whaler that made four voyages to the British southern whale fishery between 1830 and 1848. She was last listed in 1848.
- HMS Rover was to have been an 18-gun sloop. She was ordered in 1829, but the design was revised, and she was re-ordered as the next HMS Rover.
- HMS Rover (1832) was an 18-gun sloop launched in 1832 and broken up in 1845.
- HMS Rover (1853) was a 16-gun brig launched in 1853 and sold in 1862 to the Prussian Navy.
- HMS Rover (1874) was an iron screw corvette launched in 1874 and sold in 1893.
- HMS Rover (N62) was a Rainbow-class submarine launched in 1930 and sold for scrapping in 1946.

== See also ==
- HMS Sea Rover
- Rover (privateering ship)
