= HMS Rye =

Six ships of the Royal Navy have had the name HMS Rye, named after the town of Rye, East Sussex one of the Cinque Ports:

- HMS Rye (1696) was a 32-gun fifth rate launched in 1696. She was rebuilt in 1717 as a 24-gun sixth rate and used as a breakwater from 1727. She was broken up in 1735.
- HMS Rye (1727) was a 24-gun sixth rate launched in 1727 and broken up in 1735.
- HMS Rye (1740) was a 24-gun sixth rate launched in 1740 and wrecked in 1744.
- HMS Rye (1745) was a 24-gun sixth rate launched in 1745 and sold in 1763.
- HMS Rye was to have been a wood screw gunvessel. She was ordered in 1860, but cancelled in 1863.
- HMS Rye (J76) was a Bangor-class minesweeper launched in 1940 and sold in 1948.
