= HMS Trial =

HMS Trial or Tryall is the name of several vessels of the Royal Navy or its predecessors:

- English ship Tryall (1645), a pink listed as in naval service from 1645 to 1647
- HMS Tryall (1710), a 10-gun sloop launched in 1713 and broken up in 1719
- HMS Tryall (1719), a 10-gun sloop launched in 1719 and broken up in 1731
- HMS Tryall (1732), an 8-gun sloop launched in 1732 and scuttled in the South Pacific in 1741
- HMS Trial (1744), a 14-gun sloop launched in 1744 and broken up in 1776
- HMS Trial (1781), a 12-gun cutter in service from 1781 to 1794
- HMS Trial (1790), a 12-gun cutter launched 1790 and converted to a coal hulk in 1816; sold out of service in 1848
- HMS Trial (1805), a 6-gun vessel listed as in Navy service from 1805 to 1811
