= HMS Tetrarch =

Two ships of the Royal Navy have borne the name HMS Tetrarch, after the Greek term meaning "ruler of a quarter":

- HMS Tetrarch (1917) was an R-class destroyer launched in 1917 and sold in 1934.
- HMS Tetrarch (N77) was a T-class submarine launched in 1939 and sunk in 1941.
