= HMS Ready =

Six vessels of the Royal Navy have been named HMS Ready:

- HMS Ready (1797) (ex-Minerva) was a 12-gun gunboat launched in 1797 and sold in 1802.
- HMS Ready (1856) was a Clown-class gunboat launched in 1856 and broken up in 1864.
- HMS Ready (1872) was a 4-gun gunboat launched in 1872, renamed Drudge in 1894 and sold in 1920.
- HMS Ready (1915) was a Q-ship purchased in 1915 and renamed Probus in 1916.
- HMS Ready (1916) was an M-class destroyer launched in 1916 and scrapped in 1926.
- HMS Ready (J223) was an Algerine-class minesweeper launched in 1943, sold to Belgium in 1951 and renamed Jan Van Haverbeke, and scrapped in 1961.
