= HMS Ribble =

Four vessels of the Royal Navy have been named HMS Ribble, after the English river:

- HMS Ribble (1904), a River-class destroyer launched at Yarrow in 1904 and sold for scrap in 1920. It participated in the 1915 naval operations in the Dardanelles Campaign.
- HMS Ribble (K251) was assigned to a River-class frigate launched by W. Simons & Co. Ltd. of Renfrew, Scotland on 23 April 1943 but the vessel was transferred to the Royal Netherlands Navy before completion and commissioned as HNLMS Johan Maurits van Nassau.
- HMS Ribble (K525) was another River-class frigate, originally to have been called HMS Duddon. It constructed at Blyth and launched on 10 November 1943. It was lent to the Royal Canadian Navy from 24 July 1944 onward and recommissioned HMCS Ribble. Returned to the Royal Navy on 11 June 1945, the vessel was broken up in 1957.
- HMS Ribble (M2012) was a River-class minesweeper launched at Great Yarmouth on 7 May 1985 and transferred to the Brazilian Navy on 10 January 1995, and renamed Garnier Sampaio.
