= HMS Strafford (1714) =

Ship of the line of the Royal Navy

History

Great Britain
- Name: HMS Strafford
- Builder: Phillips, Plymouth Dockyard
- Launched: 16 July 1714
- Fate: Broken up, 1733

General characteristics
- Class & type: 1706 Establishment 50-gun fourth rate ship of the line
- Tons burthen: 703 bm
- Length: 130 ft (39.6 m) (gundeck)
- Beam: 35 ft (10.7 m)
- Depth of hold: 14 ft (4.3 m)
- Propulsion: Sails
- Sail plan: Full-rigged ship
- Armament: 50 guns: Gundeck: 22 × 18-pdrs; Upper gundeck: 22 × 9-pdrs; Quarterdeck: 4 × 6-pdrs; Forecastle: 2 × 6-pdrs

HMS Strafford was a 50-gun fourth rate ship of the line of the Royal Navy, built to the 1706 Establishment at Plymouth Dockyard, and launched on 16 July 1714.

Strafford served until 1733, when she was broken up.
