= HMS Sabine =

Two ships of the Royal Navy have been called HMS Sabine after the ancient Italian tribe:

- HMS Sabine was the French 16-gun Sylphe-class brig Requin that HMS Volage captured on 28 July 1808 in the Mediterranean; she was sold in 1818.
- HMS Sabine was an iron screw gunboat launched as HMS Sabrina in 1876. She was renamed HMS Sabine in 1916 on conversion to a diving tender. She was renamed again, to HMS Vivid, in 1920 before being sold in 1922.

Two other vessels named Sabine also served the Royal Navy.

- Sabine was a fishing trawler of 118grt, built in 1888 and registered in Aberdeen. The Admiralty requisitioned her in 1917 for the Fishery Reserve. She was commissioned and flew the White Ensign; she continued commercial fishing, but under Navy control until 1919, when the Admiralty returned her to her owners.
- Sabine was built in America in 1917 and the Admiralty purchased her in 1940 as a rescue tug. On 3 June 1941 she rescued the crew of Fleet Tender C (Marmari III), which had struck the wreck of Ahamo and had subsequently been torpedoed.
