= HMS Sikh =

Three ships of the Royal Navy have borne the name HMS Sikh, after the Sikhs, who formed a large part of the community in the Punjab region during British rule there:

- HMS Sikh (1889) was the name assigned to Torpedo Boat No 5, launched for the Royal Indian Marine in 1889, transferred to the Royal Navy in 1892, renamed No 105 in 1901 and sold in 1920.
- HMS Sikh (1918) was an S-class destroyer launched in 1918 and sold in 1927.
- HMS Sikh (F82) was a Tribal-class destroyer launched in 1937 and sunk in 1942.
