= HMS Tyne =

Six ships of the Royal Navy have been named HMS Tyne, after the River Tyne, England:

- HMS Tyne (1814) was a 28-gun Conway-class sixth rate launched in 1814 and sold in 1825. She made one notable capture of a pirate vessel. She became a whaler for Daniel Bennett & Sons, but was lost in early 1827 on her first voyage to the British southern whale fishery.
- HMS Tyne (1826) was a 28-gun sixth rate launched in 1826, converted to a storeship in 1848, and sold in 1862 for breaking up.
- HMS Tyne was launched in 1845 as the 36-gun fifth-rate HMS Active. She became a Royal Naval Reserve training ship in 1863, was renamed Tyne in July 1867, and then Durham in November the same year. She was sold in 1908.
- HMS Tyne (1878), launched in 1878 as SS Mariotis, was a troop ship. On 31 August 1880 she was delivering troops to HMS London in Zanzibar. She foundered in a gale off Sheerness in 1920 while awaiting disposal.
- HMS Tyne (F24) was a Hecla-class depot ship launched in 1940. She served in World War II and the Korean War, and was scrapped in 1972.
- HMS Tyne (P281) is a River-class patrol vessel launched in 2002 and currently in service.

== Battle honours ==
- Baltic 1854
- Korea 1953
