= HMS Tern =

Two ships and one shore establishment of the Royal Navy have been named HMS Tern and two other shore establishments as HMS Tern II:

- HMS Tern was a paddle minesweeper cancelled in 1918
- HMS Tern (1927) was a gunboat launched in 1927 and scuttled in 1941.
- HMS Tern (shore establishment) was a Royal Naval Air Station, RNAS Twatt, in operation between 1941 and 1946.
- HMS Tern II, RNAS Hatston was briefly commissioned HMS Tern II from 1 August to 15 September 1945.
- HMS Tern II, RNAS Skaebrea was commissioned HMS Tern II from 15 September 1945 to September 1946.
