= HMS Seagull =

Eight ships of the Royal Navy have borne the name HMS Seagull or HMS Sea Gull, after the gull: (Note: The underlying reason is that around 1810, +/- a decade, English spelling for a number of words changed abruptly. Until 1800-10s, notices in the London Gazette used the spelling Sea Gull; afterwards they used the spelling Seagull.)

- HMS Seagull (1795) was a 16-gun brig-sloop that disappeared in the English Channel in February 1805.
- HMS Seagull (1805) was a 16-gun Seagull-class brig-sloop that the Danes captured in 1808; she sank but the Danes recovered her and returned her to service. After the separation of Norway from Denmark, she transferred to the Norwegian Navy, which decommissioned her in 1817.
- HMS Seagull (1808) was a 16-gun brig-sloop, formerly the French Sylphe. The Royal Navy captured her in 1808 and sold her in 1814.
- HMS Seagull (1831) was a 12-gun schooner broken up in 1856.
- HMS Seagull (1855) was an Albacore-class wooden screw gunboat sold in 1864.
- HMS Seagull (1868) was a Plover-class gunvessel sold in 1887.
- HMS Seagull (1889) was a Sharpshooter-class torpedo gunboat converted to a minesweeper in 1909 and was sunk in a collision in 1918.
- HMS Seagull (J85) was a Halcyon-class minesweeper launched in 1937. She became a survey ship in 1945 and was broken up in 1956.

== Other Seagulls in Royal Navy service ==
- 1796: When the British captured Demerara, they captured, among other vessels, a 12-gun cutter, Zeemeeuw (Seagull), which they took into service as Seagull and put under the command of a Lieutenant Lloyd; she apparently foundered soon after. She was possibly the 8th Charter Zeemeeuw, built at Zeeland and launched c.1781 that disappears from the Dutch records in 1796. Her dimensions, in Dutch feet of 11 Rotterdam inches, were 58'½ x 20' x 7' 7/11".
- 1817: There was a Seagull that was a tender and that shared prize money with HMS Northumberland for some glass captured on Mary. (Note: A first-class share was worth £13 2s 0d; a fifth-class share, that of an able seamen, was worth 18s 0½d.)

== See also ==
- Revenue cutters Seagull and Fox captured the French privateer Friedland on 15 October 1807. Friedland was armed with two guns and small arms, and had a crew of 35 men. She was two days out of Cherbourg and had made no captures. The revenue cutters took her into Cowes.
- There may have been a HM Revenue cutter Seagull launched in 1814 and in service until 1825.
- RMAS Seagull
