= HMS Trenchant =

Three ships of the Royal Navy have borne the name HMS Trenchant:

- HMS Trenchant (1916), a R-class destroyer launched in 1916 and scrapped in 1928.
- HMS Trenchant (P331), a British T-class submarine launched in 1943 and scrapped in 1963.
- HMS Trenchant (S91), a Trafalgar-class submarine launched in 1986, decommissioned in 2022
