= HMS Ramsey =

Three ships of the Royal Navy have been named HMS Ramsey:

- HMS Ramsey (1914) - originally Isle of Man Steam Packet Company's passenger ferry The Ramsey, commissioned in 1914 as an armed boarding steamer, and sunk in 1915.
- HMS Ramsey (G60) - originally USS Meade (DD-274), a Clemson-class destroyer transferred from the US Navy in 1940.
- HMS Ramsey (M110) - is the tenth Sandown-class minehunter, launched in 1999 and decommissioned in 2021.
