= HMS Trident =

Six ships of the Royal Navy have borne the name HMS Trident or HMS Trydent, after the Trident, often associated with the Roman God of the Sea, Neptune:

- HMS Trydent (1695) was a 58-gun fourth-rate ship of the line, previously the French ship Trident, captured in 1695. She was sunk as a breakwater in 1702.
- HMS Trydent (1747) was a 64-gun third-rate ship of the line, previously the French ship Trident, captured in 1747 at the Second battle of Cape Finisterre and sold in 1763.
- HMS Trident (1768) was a 64-gun third-rate ship of the line, launched in 1768 at Portsmouth and sold in 1816.
- HMS Trident (1845) was a sloop built by Ditchburn & Mare in 1845 at Leamouth, and scrapped in 1866.
- HMS Trident (1915) was a Turkish Talisman-class destroyer under construction in Britain, but taken over while under construction by the Royal Navy in the First World War as HMS Offa. She was renamed HMS Trident before being launched in 1915. She was sold in 1921.
- HMS Trident (N52) was a T-class submarine built by Cammell Laird, Birkenhead in 1937 and sold in 1947.
