= HMS Test =

Two ships of the Royal Navy have borne the name HMS Test, after the River Test:

- HMS Test (1905) was a River-class destroyer launched speculatively in 1905 and purchased in 1909. She was sold in 1919.
- HMS Test (K239) was a River-class frigate launched in 1942. She was lent to the Royal Indian Navy between 1946 and 1947 as Neva, and was broken up in 1955.
