= HMS S1 =

Two Royal Navy ships have been called HMS S1:

- HMS S1 (1914), launched in 1914, was the lead boat in her class of submarines.
- HMS S1 was originally an experimental submarine, HMS Swordfish, the only member of her class and launched in 1916. The submarine was converted to a surface patrol boat in 1917 and renamed HMS S1.
