= HMS Sturdy =

HMS Sturdy has been the name of more than one ship of the British Royal Navy, and may refer to:

- HMS Sturdy (1912), a tug launched in 1912, renamed HMS Swarthy in 1917, and in service until 1961
- HMS Sturdy (H28), a destroyer launched in 1919 and wrecked in 1940
- HMS Sturdy (P248), a submarine commissioned in 1943 and sold in 1957
