= HMS Searcher =

Four ships of the Royal Navy have borne the name HMS Searcher:

- HMS Searcher (1562) was a brigantine built in 1562 and sold in 1564.
- HMS Searcher (1918) was an S-class destroyer launched in 1918 and sold in 1938.
- HMS Searcher (D40) was an Attacker-class escort carrier launched in 1942 and transferred under lend-lease. She was returned the US Navy in 1945 and sold into mercantile service.
- HMS Searcher (L3058) was a Landing Ship, Tank launched as LST 3508 in 1944, renamed HMS Searcher in 1947 and broken up in 1949.
