= HMS Sidon =

Two ships of the Royal Navy have been named HMS Sidon after the naval bombardment of Sidon a city in Lebanon in 1840.

- HMS Sidon (1846) was a first-class paddle frigate launched in 1846 and scrapped in 1864.
- HMS Sidon (P259) was a S-class submarine launched in 1944. She sank in Portland harbour in 1955 as a result of an accidental torpedo explosion, was subsequently raised and then sunk as a target in 1957.
