= HMS Skylark =

Three ships of the Royal Navy have borne the name HMS Skylark:

- HMS Skylark (1806) was 16-gun brig-sloop of the Seagull class
- HMS Skylark (1826) was a 10-gun Cherokee-class brig-sloop
- HMS Skylark (1932) was a minelaying tender launched in 1932 and renamed HMS Vernon in 1938 and HMS Vesuvius in 1941
