= HMS Sparkler =

Two vessels of the Royal Navy have been named HMS Sparkler:

- HMS Sparkler (1797) was launched at Rotherhithe in April 1797 and sold in September 1802. She then became a merchantman that a French privateer captured and that the Royal Navy recaptured. She was wrecked in 1814.
- HMS Sparkler (1804) was launched at Brightlingsea in August 1804 and wrecked on the Dutch coast in January 1808.

== See also ==
- RFA Sparkler, a Royal Fleet Auxiliary tugboat built during World War II and sold in 1957.
