= HMS Tuna =

HMS Tuna has been the name of more than one ship of the British Royal Navy, and may refer to:

- HMS Tuna (1915), a torpedo boat purchased c. 1915 and sold in 1920
- HMS Tuma (1940), a storeship requisitioned 1940–1941
- HMS Tuna (N94), a submarine commissioned in 1940 and scrapped in 1945
