= HMS Slaney =

Three vessels of the Royal Navy have been named HMS Slaney:

- HMS Slaney (1813) was a 20-gun Cyrus-class post ship launched in 1813. She was converted into a receiving ship in 1832 and was broken up at Bermuda in 1838.
- HMS Slaney (1857) was an Algerine-class gunboat launched in 1857. She was wrecked in a typhoon off Hong Kong in 1870.
- HMS Slaney (1877) was a Medina-class gunboat launched in 1877. She was converted into a diving tender in 1906 before being broken up in 1923.
