= HMS Trepassey =

Two ships of the Royal Navy have borne the name HMS Trepassey, or the alternative spelling HMS Trepassy, named for the fishing village of Trepassey on Newfoundland, with the name originating from the French word trépassés, meaning 'dead men':

- HMS Trepassey (1779) was a 14-gun brig-sloop, the former Massachusetts privateer Wild Cat, launched and captured in 1779, and then purchased in 1779. She was captured by the Americans in 1781, but was subsequently retaken in 1782. She was sold in 1784.
- HMS Trepassey (1789) was a sloop launched in 1789; she may have been sold in 1803, but records of commanders exist to 1807.
