= HMS Trumpeter =

Several ships of the British Royal Navy have been named HMS Trumpeter.

- HMS Trumpeter (D09) – an escort carrier of the Second World War
- HMS Trumpeter (1947) was a Landing Ship, Tank launched in 1945 as HMS LST 3524. She was renamed HMS Trumpeter in 1947. Transferred to the Ministry of Transport in 1956 and renamed Empire Fulmar. She was sold in 1968.
- HMS Trumpeter (P294) – a fast patrol boat.
