= HMS Talavera =

Two ships of the Royal Navy have borne the name HMS Talavera:

- HMS Talavera (1818) was an 74-gun third rate, launched in 1818 and destroyed by fire in 1840
- HMS Waterloo (1818), originally ordered as the Talavera but was renamed on the stocks after the Battle of Waterloo
