= HMS Rother =

Two ships of the Royal Navy have been named HMS Rother:

- HMS Rother (1904) was a River-class destroyer launched in 1904 and sold for scrap in 1919
- HMS Rother (K224) was a River-class frigate launched in 1941 and scrapped in 1955
