= HMS Raider =

Three ships of the Royal Navy have been called HMS Raider.

- HMS Raider (1916) was an R-class destroyer launched in 1916
- HMS Raider (H15) was a Q and R-class destroyer destroyer launched in 1942.
- HMS Raider (P275) is a GRP Archer-class commissioned in 1998
