= HMS Thrasher =

Four ships of the Royal Navy have borne the name HMS Thrasher:

- HMS Thrasher (1804) was a 12-gun brig, previously the mercantile Adamant, built in 1804, and purchased that year by the navy. She was sold in 1814 and wrecked in 1815.
- HMS Thrasher (1856) was a wood screw gunboat of the Albacore class. She was built in 1856 and sold in 1883.
- HMS Thrasher (1895) was a B-class torpedo boat destroyer, completed in 1895. She served in the First World War, and was sold in 1919.
- HMS Thrasher (N37) was a T-class submarine. She was launched in 1940 and served in the Second World War. She was broken up in 1947.

== See also ==
- USS Thrasher
