= HMS Tonbridge =

Two ships of the British Royal Navy have been called HMS Tonbridge, after the Kent town:

- HMS Tonbridge (1918) was a Hunt-class minesweeper launched in 1918 and sold in 1928.
- HMS Tonbridge (T119) was a 683-ton civilian ship built in 1924 but requisitioned by the Royal Navy as a netlayer during World War II. It was sunk near Great Yarmouth, Norfolk on 22 August 1941 by the German Air Force with the loss of 35 lives.

== See also ==
- HMS Tonbridge Castle
