= HMS Redmill =

HMS Redmill may refer to more than one British ship of the Royal Navy:

- HMS Medina (1916), a destroyer launched in 1916 and sold in 1921 that bore the name HMS Redmill while under construction until renamed Medina in 1915; see Admiralty M-class destroyer
- HMS Redmill (K554), a frigate in service from 1943 to 1945
