= HMS Strenuous =

At least three ships of the Royal Navy have been named HMS Strenuous :

- HMS Strenuous (1805) was a Confounder-class gunbrig sold in 1814.
- HMS Strenuous (1918) was an S-class destroyer launched in 1918 and scrapped in 1932.
- HMS Strenuous (J338) was a Catherine-class minesweeper of World War II.
