= HMS Regulus =

Three vessels of the Royal Navy have been named HMS Regulus, after the star:

- HMS Regulus (1785) was a fifth rate ship of 44 guns, launched at Northam in January 1785 and converted to a troopship in 1793. Because Regulus served in the navy's Egyptian campaign (8 March to 2 September 1801), her officers and crew qualified for the clasp "Egypt" to the Naval General Service Medal, which the Admiralty issued in 1847 to all surviving claimants. Regulus was broken up in March 1816.
- HMS Regulus (N88) was a Rainbow-class submarine launched at Barrow-in-Furness in June 1930 and lost in December 1940, possibly sunk by a mine near Taranto, Southern Italy.
- HMS Regulus (J327) was an Algerine-class minesweeper launched at Toronto in September 1943 and originally to have been called HMCS Longbranch. In January 1945 a mine sank her off Corfu.
