= HMS Seraph =

Two vessels of the Royal Navy have been named HMS Seraph:

- HMS Seraph (1918), an S-class destroyer launched in 1918 and sold in 1934.
- HMS Seraph (P219), an S-class submarine launched in 1941. She served in World War II and was broken up in 1965.
