= Grenville (1764 EIC ship) =

British merchant ship and naval transport 1764–1779

History

Great Britain
- Name: Grenville
- Namesake: William Grenville, 1st Baron Grenville
- Owner: EIC voyages 1-3: John Durand; EIC voyage 4: William Nixon
- Operator: British East India Company (EIC)
- Builder: Wells, Deptford
- Launched: 10 December 1764
- Fate: Sold 21 May 1777

Great Britain
- Name: HMS Tortoise
- Acquired: 21 May 1777 by purchase
- Fate: Foundered 4 November 1779

General characteristics
- Tons burthen: 499, (Note: It was standard practice for some time for the EIC to declare a burthen of 499 tons, or fewer. By doing so the company avoided the expense of paying for a chaplain as required by law for vessels of 500 tons or over.) or 699, or 700, or 7058/94 (bm)
- Length: 110 ft 10 in (33.8 m)
- Beam: 34 ft 7 in (10.5 m)
- Depth of hold: 14 ft 2 1/2 in (4.3 m)
- Complement: 99 (EIC)
- Armament: EIC: 26 guns; Transport: 22 × 9-pounder + 4 × 6-pounder guns

Grenville was launched at Deptford in 1764 as an East Indiaman. She made four voyages for the British East India Company (EIC) before her owners sold her in 1777 to the Royal Navy, which renamed her HMS Tortoise and employed her as a transport. She foundered in 1779.

== East Indiaman ==
- EIC voyage #1 (1765–1766): Captain Parson Fenner sailed from the Downs on 4 March 1765, bound for Madras and Bengal. Grenville reached São Tiago on 29 March and the Cape of Good Hope on 5 July. She was at Madras on 5 September and reached Kedgeree on 15 October. Homeward bound, she was at Ingeli on 8 December, reached St Helena on 30 May 1766, and arrived back at the Downs on 21 August.
- EIC voyage #2 (1768–1769): Captain Burnet Abercrombie sailed from the Downs on 7 April 1768, bound for Madras and Bombay. Grenville reached False Bay on 9 July and Madras on 5 September. She was at Masulipatam on 25 September before returning to Madras on 6 October. She arrived at Bombay on 15 December. Homeward bound, she was at Cochin on 26 April 1769 and Simon's Bay on 11 July. She reached St Helena on 14 August and arrived back at the Downs on 3 November.
- EIC voyage #3 (1771–1772): Captain Abercrombie sailed from the Downs on 17 March 1771, bound for China. Grenville was at Batavia on 26 July and arrived at Whampoa Anchorage on 11 September. Homeward bound, she crossed the Second Bar on 11 February 1772, was at Simon's Bay again on 2 May, reached St Helena on 5 June, and arrived back at the Downs on 3 August.
- EIC voyage #4 (1775–1777): Captain Abercrombie sailed from Portsmouth on 26 April 1775, bound for Madras and Bombay. She reached Simon's Bay on 21 August and arrived at Madras on 10 December. She was at Masulipatam on 29 January 1776 and back at Madras on 6 February. She reached Cochin on 10 March and arrived at Bombay on 10 April. Homeward bound, she was at Madras on 16 August, and the Cape on 16 December. She reached St Helena on 20 January 1777 and arrived back at the Downs on 25 April.

Sale: The Admiralty purchased Grenville on 21 May 1777 at Lloyd's Coffee House for £3160.

== HMS Tortoise ==
The Royal Navy renamed Grenville as HMS Tortoise. She underwent fitting at Deptford between June and July 1777. Commander Jahleel Brenton commissioned her in June for North America. He sailed for the Leeward Islands on 26 December 1778.

Although she had become a naval vessel, Lloyd's Register continued to list her.

Year	Master	Owner	Trade	Source
1779	T.Brinton		London transport	LR

== Loss ==
On 30 October 1779, Tortoise, Captain John Frodsham, was sailing from Saint Kitts to England in company with a number of other vessels. She was leaky, and as the crew was becoming exhausted from manning the pumps, Frodsham ordered signals of distress. Her crew heaved guns overboard and cut her masts away, but she was salvageable. By 4 November the weather had moderated sufficiently to permit the crew to abandon her to founder. A brig that had stood by rescued the crew.
