= HMS Rattler =

Eight ships of the Royal Navy have borne the name HMS Rattler:

- HMS Rattler (1783) was a 16-gun sloop launched in 1783 and sold in 1792. She then made two voyages as a whaler and two voyages as a slave ship before she was condemned as unseaworthy in 1802. She returned to service though, sailing as a whaler in the northern whale fishery, sailing out of Leith. She continued whaling until ice crushed her in June 1830.
- HMS Rattler (1793) was a hired cutter serving from 1793 until 1796 until the Navy purchased her and renamed her HMS Sparrow. Sparrow was broken up in 1805.
- HMS Rattler (1795) was a 16-gun sloop launched in 1795 and sold in 1815.
- HMS Rattler (1797) was the mercantile Hope that the Royal Navy purchased at Leith in 1797. It initially named her GB No.41, and then renamed her HMS Rattler. The Navy sold her in 1802. She returned to the name Hope and became a merchantman trading with Hamburg, Gibraltar, and lastly, Cowes. She was last listed in 1816.
- HMS Rattler (1843) was a wood screw sloop launched in 1843. It had been planned to name her HMS Ardent, but this was dropped in 1842. She was broken up in 1856.
- HMS Rattler (1862) was a wood screw sloop launched in 1862 and wrecked in 1868.
- HMS Rattler (1886) was a composite screw gunboat launched in 1886. She was used for harbour service from 1910, and as a training ship from 1919, when she was renamed HMS Dryad. She was sold in 1924.
- HMS Rattler (J217) was an Algerine-class minesweeper launched in 1942 and was renamed HMS Loyalty in 1943; a German submarine sank her in 1944.

== See also ==
- His Majesty's hired armed cutter Rattler served the Royal Navy between 1793 and 1796 when the Navy purchased her and named her HMS Sparrow (1796). Sparrow was broken up in 1805.
- HMS Rattle (1802) was a 14-gun brig listed between 1802 and 1805.
- Ships named HMS Rattlesnake
