= HMS Sealark =

Five vessels of the Royal Navy have borne the name HMS Sealark (frequently written Sea Lark), a general term for any of several small sandpipers and plovers:

- HMS Sealark (1806) was a 4-gun Cuckoo-class schooner launched in 1806 and wrecked in 1809.
- HMS Sealark (1811) was the American schooner Fly, launched in 1801 or 1811, that HMS Scylla captured in 1811 and which was taken into the Royal Navy as a 10-gun schooner; she was sold in 1820.
- HMS Sealark was a Cherokee-class brig-sloop ordered in 1830 but cancelled in 1831.

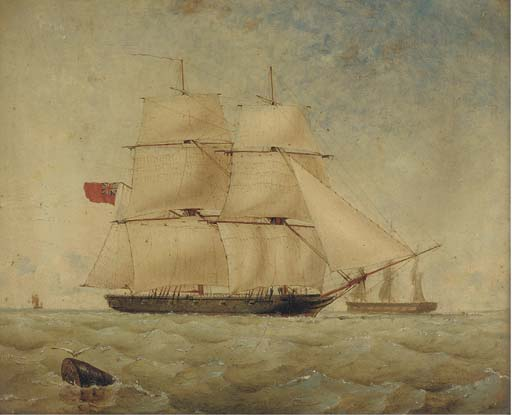
H.M. brig Sea Lark (1843), running inshore. Thomas Goldsworthy Dutton

- HMS Sealark (1843) was an 8-gun brig launched in 1843 and sold in 1898.
- HMS Sealark (1903) was a private yacht launched in 1887, acquired in 1903 and initially commissioned as HMS Investigator, renamed to HMS Sealark in 1904, decommissioned in 1914, purchased for civilian use in 1919, and hulked in 1924.
