= HMS Rolla =

Three vessels of the British Royal Navy have borne the name HMS Rolla:

- HMS Rolla was a 152 or 165-ton (bm) 16 to 18-gun brig built in France in 1801. She twice received letters of marque in 1805. She made one trip as a slave ship during which the French Navy captured her. The British Royal Navy recaptured her in February 1806 at Cape Town and took her into service. She returned to England in December 1807 and was laid-up until sold in 1810. She then became a merchantman until she was lost or broken up in 1825.
- HMS Rolla (1808) was launched in 1808 and was the first Cherokee-class brig-sloop to be launched; she captured a French privateer in 1811. She was sold at Deptford in 1822. She went into mercantile service and in 1825 participated with Sir George Osborne in a commercial and scientific exploration voyage to the Pacific. She was reported to have caught fire and burnt in 1836 in the Bonny River.
- HMS Rolla (1829), the second Cherokee-class brig-sloop of that name, was launched in 1829, on the West Africa Squadron (1836–1847), was a training ship in 1848, a tender to HMS Victory, and was broken up by 1868.
