= HMS Surinam =

Three ships of the Royal Navy have borne the name HMS Surinam, after an English variation of Suriname:

- HMS Surinam was an 18-gun sloop, previously the French Hussard or Hussar. She was captured in 1799, captured by the Dutch in 1803 but recaptured in 1807 and re-added the following year. She may have been briefly, or tentatively renamed Samarang or Sasnarang. She was listed until 1809.
- HMS Surinam (1804) was a 16-gun sloop, previously the Dutch Pylades. She was seized in May 1804 at the capture of Surinam, was paid off in June, but was listed until 1808.
- HMS Surinam (1805) was an 18-gun Cruizer-class brig-sloop launched in 1805 and sold in 1825.
