= HMS Starling =

Nine ships of the Royal Navy have borne the name HMS Starling after the starling:

- HMS Starling (1801) was a 12-gun gun-brig launched in 1801 and wrecked in 1804. She ran on shore on 25 December in a fog near Calais. She was burnt and her crew returned safely to Deal.
- HMS Starling (1805) was a 12-gun gun-brig launched in 1805 and sold in 1814.
- HMS Starling (1817) was a 10-gun cutter launched in 1817 and broken up in 1828.
- HMS Starling (1829) was a 4-gun schooner launched in 1829. She was used as a survey ship from 1834, and was sold in 1844.
- HMS Starling (1855) was a Dapper-class wooden screw gunboat launched in 1855 and sold in 1871.
- HMS Starling (1882) was a composite screw gunboat launched in 1882 and sold into civilian service in 1905 as the Stella Maris.
- HMS Starling (1905) was a tender, formerly the War Office vessel Miner 17. She was transferred in 1905 and renamed in 1906. She was sold in 1923.
- HMS Starling (U66) was a Modified Black Swan-class sloop launched in 1942 and broken up in 1965.
- HMS Starling (P241) was a Peacock-class patrol vessel launched in 1984 and sold to the Philippines in 1997, being renamed Artemio Ricarte.
