= HMS Rhododendron =

Two ships of the Royal Navy have borne the name HMS Rhododendron, after the flower:

- HMS Rhododendron (1917) was an Anchusa-class sloop launched in 1917 and sunk in 1918.
- HMS Rhododendron (K78) was a Flower-class corvette launched in 1940 and sold in 1947 for mercantile service as Maj Vinke.
