= HMS Tobago =

HMS Tobago has been the name of more than one ship of the British Royal Navy, and may refer to:

- HMS Tobago was the brig-sloop privateer Governor Trumbull, launched at Connecticut in 1777, which HMS Venus captured in March 1779; the Royal Navy sold her in 1783
- HMS Tobago (1805), a schooner purchased in 1805, captured by France in 1806, recaptured by the Royal Navy in 1809 and sold
- HMS Tobago (1918), a destroyer launched in 1918 and sold in 1922
- HMS Tobago (K585), a frigate in commission from 1944 to 1945
