= HMS Seymour =

HMS Seymour has been the name of more than one ship of the British Royal Navy:

- HMS Seymour (1916), a destroyer leader launched in 1916 and sold in 1930
- HMS Seymour (K563), a frigate in service from 1943 to 1946
