= HMS Staunch =

Five ships of the Royal Navy have borne the name HMS Staunch:

- HMS Staunch (1797) was a 12-gun gunvessel launched in 1797, purchased later that year, and sold in 1803.
- HMS Staunch (1804) was a 12-gun gun-brig launched in 1804 and wrecked in 1811.
- HMS Staunch (1856) was an Albacore-class wooden screw gunboat launched in 1856 and sold in 1866.
- HMS Staunch (1867) was an iron screw gunboat launched in 1867 and sold in 1904.
- HMS Staunch (1910) was an Acorn-class destroyer launched in 1910 and sunk in 1917.
