= HMS Savage =

Eight ships of the Royal Navy have borne the name HMS Savage:

- HMS Savage (1748) was a 14-gun sloop purchased in 1748 and wrecked later that year.
- HMS Savage (1750) was an 8-gun sloop launched in 1750 and wrecked in 1776.
- HMS Savage (1778) was a 14-gun sloop launched in 1778, captured and recaptured in September 1781, hulked in 1804, and sold in 1815.
- HMS Savage (1805) was a 16-gun brig-sloop launched in 1805 and sold in 1819.
- HMS Savage (1830) was a 10-gun Cherokee-class brig-sloop launched in 1830. She became a dockyard chain lighter in 1853 and was broken up in 1866.
- HMS Savage (1856) was an Albacore-class screw gunboat launched in 1856, used as a mooring lighter and renamed YC 3 from 1864, and was broken up in 1888.
- HMS Savage (1910) was a Beagle-class destroyer launched in 1910 and sold in 1921.
- HMS Savage (G20) was an S-class destroyer launched in 1942 and broken up in 1962.
