= HMS Shakespeare =

Two ships of the Royal Navy have borne the name HMS Shakespeare, after poet and playwright William Shakespeare:

- HMS Shakespeare (1917) was a Thornycroft type flotilla leader launched in 1917. She was handed over to the breakers in part-payment for RMS Majestic in 1936, and was scrapped.
- HMS Shakespeare (P221) was an S-class submarine launched in 1941 and sold in 1946.
