= HMS Turquoise =

Four ships of the Royal Navy have been named HMS Turquoise.

- HMS Turquoise (1876), an Emerald-class corvette in service 1876–1892
- HMS Turquoise (1893), a fleet messenger sunk in the Atlantic by SM U-28 on 31 July 1915
- HMS Turquoise (1918), an S-class destroyer in service 1919–1928 and sold 1932
- HMS Turquoise (T45), a naval trawler, damaged on 31 August 1942 after colliding with the destroyer HMS Vanessa which lost control after an attack by German aircraft

== See also ==
- HMT Kingston Turquoise
