= HMS Rochester =

Four ships of the Royal Navy have borne the name HMS Rochester, after the town of Rochester on the River Medway:

- HMS Rochester (1693) was a 48-gun fourth rate launched in 1693. She was rebuilt in 1715, and again as a hospital ship in 1744. She was renamed HMS Maidstone after the second rebuild and was broken up in 1748.
- HMS Rochester (1749) was a 50-gun fourth rate launched in 1749 and sold in 1770.
- HMS Rochester was a prison ship, launched in 1749 as the 74-gun third rate HMS Hero. She became a prison ship in 1793, was renamed HMS Rochester in 1800 and was broken up in 1810.
- HMS Rochester (L50) was a Shoreham-class sloop launched in 1931 and sold in 1951.

== See also ==
- HMS Rochester Prize
