= HMS Thais =

Several ships of the Royal Navy have been named HMS Thais:

- HMS Thais (1806), an 18-gun sloop, sold in 1818
- HMS Thais (1829), a 10-gun Cherokee-class brig-sloop, that became a Post Office Packet Service packet, sailing out of Falmouth, Cornwall. She foundered with the loss of all hands in 1833.
