= HMS Sable =

Two ships of the Royal Navy have been called HMS Sable after the small carnivorous mammal:

- HMS Sable (1916) was R-class destroyer launched in 1916 and sold in 1927.
- HMS Sable (1933) was another R-class destroyer, originally named HMS Salmon and also launched in 1916. The vessel was renamed HMS Sable in 1933 and arrived at Hayle for breaking up in March 1937.
