= HMS Stalker =

Three ships of the Royal Navy have been named HMS Stalker:

- HMS Stalker (1915) was a converted trawler
- HMS Stalker (D91) was an escort carrier previously USS Hamlin
- HMS Stalker (L3515) was a Landing Ship, Tank previously LST 3515
