= HMS Spanker =

Four vessels of the British Royal Navy have been named HMS Spanker:

- HMS Spanker (1794), a 24-gun floating battery of 500 tons (builder's measurement) launched at Deptford in 1794, and deleted from the Navy List on 31 August 1810.
- HMS Spanker (1856), an Albacore-class wooden screw gunboat in service from 1856 to 1874.
- HMS Spanker (1889), a Sharpshooter-class torpedo gunboat launched in 1889 and converted to a minesweeper in 1909. Sold for scrap in March 1920.
- HMS Spanker (J226), an Algerine-class minesweeper launched in 1943 and decommissioned in 1947. She was sold to the Belgian Navy in 1953 and renamed De Brouwer. Broken up at Ghent in 1968.
