= HMS Subtle =

Subtle has been the name of more than one ship of the British Royal Navy, and may refer to:

- Subtle (31) (also Red Galley); listed 1544 to 1560.
- HMS Subtle (1806) was previously the French schooner Impériale that HMS Cygnet captured in 1806; she received the name Vigilant, and later that year, Subtle. She was wrecked off Bermuda in 1807.
- HMS Subtle (1807) was a vessel of uncertain origin captured in 1807; Subtle was wrecked in 1812.
- HMS Subtle (P251) was an S-class submarine launched in January 1944 and sold for breaking up in July 1959 in Charlestown.
