= HMS Somme =

HMS Somme may refer to:

- HMS Somme (1918) was an S-class destroyer launched in 1918 and sold in 1932.
- HMS Somme was a Battle-class destroyer laid down in 1945 and cancelled later that year
