= HMS Saldanha =

Two ships of the Royal Navy have borne the name HMS Saldanha, after the 1796 capitulation of Saldanha Bay:

- HMS Saldanha was the 40-gun fifth rate Castor, which the Royal Navy had captured from the Dutch in 1796 at Saldanha Bay, placed on harbour service from 1797, and sold in 1806.
- HMS Saldanha (1809) was a 36-gun fifth rate launched in 1809 and wrecked in 1811.
