= HMS Tancred =

HMS Tancred is the designation which has been given to a number of ships of the Royal Navy after the Norman knight Tancred de Hauteville.

- HMS Tancred (1917) was an R-class destroyer launched in 1917 and sold for scrapping on 17 May 1928.
- HMS Tancred was a BAT-1-class rescue tug launched in 1943 as USS BAT-13, transferred under Lend Lease to Royal Navy on 18 February 1943, then transferred to the Australian Commonwealth Marine Salvage Board on 2 September 1944, sold to the Department of Marine and Harbours, South Australia in 1949 and scrapped in 1994.
