= HMS Tay =

Three ships of the Royal Navy were named HMS Tay.

- HMS Tay (1813), a 20-gun post-ship wrecked in 1816
- HMS Tay (1876), iron screw gunboat of three 54-pounder guns launched 1876 by Palmer, Jarrow; Sold 1920 to Stanlee, Dover.
- HMS Tay (K232), a River-class frigate in service 1942-47

== See also ==
- HMS Tay and Tyne
