= HMS Toreador =

Toreador was the name of two ships of the Royal Navy.

- HMS Toreador (1918), an S-class destroyer.
- HMS Toreador (1925), a requisitioned Great Western Railway passenger ferry.
