= HMS Racehorse =

Nine ships of the Royal Navy have borne the name HMS Racehorse:

- HMS Racehorse (1757) was an 18-gun privateer captured from the French in 1757. She was on Arctic discovery in 1773. She was renamed Thunder (and re-classed as a bomb vessel) on 24 October 1775. The French captured Thunder off Sandy Hook on 14 August 1778.
- HMS Race Horse was the mercantile Hercules that the Royal Navy purchased at Jamaica in 1776, and that the American Andrea Doria captured on 24 December 1776. Surprise's crew destroyed her in 1777 at Delaware Bay to prevent the Royal Navy from recapturing her.
- HMS Racehorse (1777) was a 16-gun sloop purchased in 1777 and shortly thereafter renamed Senegal. The French 74-gun Hector captured her on 14 August 1778. The French renamed her Sénégal. Zephyr recaptured her on 2 November 1780 after an engagement that lasted five hours and in which the French lost 12 killed and 28 wounded, while the British lost two killed and four wounded. The Royal Navy took her back into service as HMS Senegal. Senegal was at Gorée being repaired when she caught fire and exploded on 22 November, with the loss of her captain and 22 men.
- HMS Racehorse (1778) was a 10-gun schooner purchased in 1778. She was wrecked in 1779 at Beachy Head.
- HMS Racehorse (1781) was a 16-gun sloop launched in 1781. She was broken up in 1799.
- HMS Racehorse (1806) was an 18-gun Cruizer-class brig-sloop launched in February 1806. She was wrecked in 1822 off the Isle of Man.
- HMS Racehorse (1830) was an 18-gun sloop launched in 1830. She became a coal hulk in 1860 and was sold in 1901.
- HMS Racehorse (1860) was a wood screw gunvessel launched in 1860. She was wrecked in 1864 near Yantai in China.
- HMS Racehorse (1900) was a Greyhound-class destroyer launched in 1900. She was sold in 1920, resold, and broken up in 1921.
- HMS Racehorse (H11) was an R-class destroyer launched in 1942. She was sold in 1949.
