= HMS Swale =

Two ships of the Royal Navy have been named HMS Swale, after the River Swale of York:

- HMS Swale (1905), a Palmer type River-class destroyer in service from 1905 to 1919
- HMS Swale (K217), a River-class frigate in service from 1942 to 1955, loaned to the South African Navy for six months at the end of the Second World War
