= HMS Spiteful =

At least five ships of the British Royal Navy have been named HMS Spiteful;

- HMS Spiteful (1794) was a vessel purchased in the West Indies that served as a gunboat at the capture of Martinique, St Lucia, and Guadeloupe in 1794; her fate is unknown. Her crew qualified for the Naval General Service Medal with clasp "17 Mar. Boat Service 1794"
- HMS Spiteful (1797) – a 14-gun brig, launched in 1797, disposed of in 1823.
- HMS Spiteful (1842) – a 6-gun steam sloop, launched on 24 March 1842, disposed of in 1883.
- HMS Spiteful (1899) – a B-class torpedo boat destroyer built in 1899, and scrapped in 1920.
- HMS Spiteful (P227) – an S-class submarine of the Second World War.
