= HMS Torch =

Six ships of the Royal Navy have been named HMS Torch:

- HMS Torch (1804), a fireship, purchased in 1804 and sold in 1807
- HMS Torch (1805), formerly the French Torche captured in 1805, renamed but never commissioned. She was broken up in 1811.
- HMS Torch (1845), launched in 1845 and sold in 1856.
- HMS Torch (1859), a Philomel-class gunvessel launched in 1859 and broken up in 1881.
- HMS Torch (1894), an Alert-class sloop launched in 1894. She was transferred to the New Zealand government in 1917 as Firebrand.
- HMS Torch (1918), a S-class destroyer launched in 1918 and sold in 1929.

In addition one vessel of the Royal Maritime Auxiliary Service has been named Torch

- RMAS Torch (A141), a torpedo recovery vessel launched in 1979 and sold in 1999.
