= HMS Scimitar =

Three ships of the Royal Navy have borne the name HMS Scimitar, after the scimitar, a curved sword:

- HMS Scimitar (H21) was an S-class destroyer launched in 1918 and sold in 1947.
- HMS Scimitar (P271) was a Scimitar-class fast training boat launched in 1969 and sold in 1983.
- HMS Scimitar (P284) is a Scimitar-class patrol vessel, formerly MV Grey Fox. She entered service in 1993, was transferred to the Royal Navy in 2002 and renamed Scimitar, and as of 9 March 2022 is decommissioned, no longer in service and up for disposal.

== Battle honours ==
Ships named Scimitar have earned the following battle honours:

- Dunkirk 1940
- Atlantic 1940–42, 1944
- Arctic 1942
- English Channel 1943-44
