= HMS Rhyl =

Two ships of the Royal Navy have been named HMS Rhyl, after the town of Rhyl in Wales:

- HMS Rhyl (J36) was a Bangor-class minesweeper launched in 1940 and sold in 1948.
- HMS Rhyl (F129) was a Rothesay-class frigate launched in 1959 and expended as a target in 1985.
