= HMS Terrible =

Eight vessels of the British Royal Navy have been named HMS Terrible:

- HMS Terrible (1694), 26-gun sixth rate captured by the Spanish near Cape Saint Vincent
- HMS Terrible (1730), 14-gun bomb vessel
- HMS Terrible (1747), 74-gun third rate captured from the French
- HMS Terrible (1762), 74-gun third rate
- HMS Terrible (1785), 74-gun third rate
- HMS Terrible (1845), wooden-hulled paddle frigate
- HMS Terrible (1895), a Powerful-class protected cruiser
- HMS Terrible (R93), an aircraft carrier launched in 1944 and sold to Australia in 1947, where it was renamed HMAS Sydney

== Other British military vessels named Terrible ==
- Terrible was a gunboat that the garrison at Gibraltar launched in June 1782 during the Great Siege of Gibraltar. She was one of 12. Each was armed with an 18-pounder gun, and received a crew of 21 men drawn from Royal Navy vessels stationed at Gibraltar. Porcupine provided Revenge's crew.
