= HMS Skate =

Two ships of the Royal Navy have been named HMS Skate after the fish:

- HMS Skate (1895) was a Sturgeon-class destroyer in commission from 1895 to 1907.
- HMS Skate (1917) was an R-class destroyer in commission from 1917 to 1947.
