= HMS Sepoy =

Two ships of the Royal Navy have borne the name HMS Sepoy, whilst another two were planned but never entered service:

- HMS Sepoy was to have been a wooden Rifleman-class screw gunvessel. She was ordered in 1846 but was cancelled in 1849.
- HMS Sepoy (1856) was a wooden Albacore-class screw gunboat launched in 1856 and broken up in 1868.
- HMS Sepoy (1918) was an S-class destroyer launched in 1918 and sold in 1932.
- HMS Sepoy was to have been a Catherine-class minesweeper. She was launched in 1943 but retained by the US Navy as USS Dextrous.
