= HMS Tulip =

Five ships of the Royal Navy have been named HMS Tulip or Tulip:

- English ship Tulip (1652), a 32-gun ship captured in 1652 and sold in 1657
- English ship Tulip (1672), a 2-gun sloop built in 1672 and lost in 1673
- English ship Tulip (1672), a 6-gun dogger captured in 1672 and sold the same year
- HMS Tulip (1916), an Aubrietia-class sloop
- HMS Tulip (K29), a Flower-class corvette
