= HMS Raisonnable =

Two ships of the Royal Navy have been named HMS Raisonnable, French for "reasonable":

- HMS Raisonnable (1758), originally a French vessel, the first ship to bear the name was a 64-gun third-rate ship of the line. She was captured by the Royal Navy ships HMS Dorsetshire and HMS Achilles on 29 May 1758. She was lost off Martinique on 3 February 1762.
- HMS Raisonnable (1768), built at Chatham Dockyard and launched in 1768, was a 64-gun third-rate ship of the line. She was the first ship that the future Lord Nelson served aboard. She took part in the Battle of Copenhagen and the Battle of Cape Finisterre (1805). She was broken up at Sheerness in 1815.
