= HMS Strongbow =

A number of ships of the Royal Navy have carried the name HMS Strongbow, including:

- HMS Strongbow (1916), an R-class destroyer, launched in 1916 and sunk in combat in 1917.
- HMS Strongbow (P235), an S-class submarine, in commission from 1943 to 1945.
