= HMS Serene =

Two vessels of the British Royal Navy have been named HMS Serene:

- HMS Serene (1918) was an S-class destroyer launched in 1918 and scrapped in 1939
- HMS Serene (J354) was an Algerine-class minesweeper launched in 1943 and scrapped in 1959
