= HMS Spiraea =

Two vessels of the Royal Navy have been named HMS Spiraea after the shrub:

- HMS Spiraea (1917) was an Anchusa-class sloop launched in 1917 and sold in 1922.
- HMS Spiraea (K08) was a Flower-class corvette launched in 1940 and sold in 1945.
