= HMS Scourge =

Ten ships of the Royal Navy have been named HMS Scourge :

- HMS Scourge (1779) was a 14-gun brig-sloop launched in 1779. In 1793 she captured Sans Cullote and she foundered in 1795.
- HM galley Scourge (1779) was the 4-gun galley Congress of the Georgia navy that Comet captured on the Savannah River in March 1779. The Royal Navy took Congress into service as Scourge and she was listed until 1784.
- HMS Scourge (1794) was a 4-gun gunvessel, formerly a Dutch hoy. The Admiralty purchased her in 1794 and renamed her HMS Crash in 1803; she was broken up that same year.
- HMS Scourge was a 22-gun sloop, formerly the French corvette Robuste. The Royal Navy captured her in 1796 and sold her in 1802.
- HMS Scourge (1803) was a 16-gun sloop, formerly the mercantile Herald launched in 1799, that the Admiralty purchased in 1803 and sold in 1816. New owners returned her to her previous name and Herald then traded until she was lost in 1835.
- HMS Scourge (1844) was a wooden paddle sloop launched in 1844 and broken up in 1865.
- HMS Scourge (1871) was an Ant-class gunboat launched in 1871, renamed C79 as a dockyard craft in 1904, and was listed until 1930.
- HMS Scourge (1910) was a Beagle-class destroyer launched in 1910 and sold in 1921.
- HMS Scourge (1939) was the drifter Ban-Rig (built 1908), requisitioned as a minesweeper and renamed SKYROCKET in 1942; returned 1946.
- HMS Scourge (G01) was an S-class destroyer launched in 1942. She was sold to the Royal Netherlands Navy in 1946, renamed HNLMS Evertsen, and was broken up in 1963.

== Other British military vessels named Scourge ==
- Scourge was a gunboat launched by the garrison in Gibraltar in June 1782 during the Great Siege of Gibraltar. She was one of 12. Each was armed with an 18-pounder gun, and received a crew of 21 men drawn from Royal Navy vessels stationed at Gibraltar. Porcupine provided Scourge's crew.
