= HMS Stork =

Seven ships of the Royal Navy have borne the name HMS Stork:

- HMS Stork (1652) was a 36-gun ship, originally Dutch, captured in 1652, took part in the Battle of the Gabbard, hulked in 1653, sold in 1663.
- HMS Stork (1756) was a 10-gun sloop, launched in 1756, captured by the French in August 1758. Her first French captain called EV marquis de Calvimont de Tayac.
- HMS Stork a sloop, captured a vessel 14 March 1778 off Santo Domingo.
- HMS Stork (1796) was a 16-gun ship sloop of the Cormorant class, launched in 1796, broken up in 1816.
- HMS Stork (1855) was a 2-gun Dapper-class wooden screw gunboat launched in 1855, used as a coal hulk from 1874, sold for breaking up in 1884.
- HMS Stork (1882) was a 4-gun composite screw gunboat, launched in 1882, used as a survey ship from 1887, lent to the Navy League in 1913 and moored at Hammersmith as a training ship for boys, broken up in 1950.
- HMS Stork (1916) was an R-class destroyer, launched in 1916, sold for breaking up in 1927.
- HMS Stork (L81) was a Bittern-class sloop, launched in 1936, broken up in 1958.
