= HMS Turbulent =

Five vessels of the British Royal Navy have been named HMS Turbulent:

- HMS Turbulent (1805) was a Confounder-class gun-brig launched in 1805, captured by the Danes in 1808 and sold in 1814
- HMS Turbulent (1916) was a Talisman-class destroyer launched in 1916. She served in World War I and was sunk at the Battle of Jutland on 1 June 1916
- HMS Turbulent (1919) was an S-class destroyer launched in 1919 and sold in 1936
- HMS Turbulent (N98) was a T-class submarine launched in 1941. She served in World War II and was sunk by either depth charges or a mine in the Mediterranean in May 1943
- HMS Turbulent (S87) was a Trafalgar-class submarine launched in 1982 and decommissioned in 2012
