= HMS Truculent =

Two ships of the Royal Navy have been named HMS Truculent.

- HMS Truculent (1917) was a Yarrow Later M-class destroyer that saw service in World War I.
- HMS Truculent (P315) was a T-class submarine that saw service in World War II.
