= HMS Salvia =

Two ships of the Royal Navy have been named HMS Salvia:

- HMS Salvia (1916), an Aubrietia-class sloop
- HMS Salvia (K97), a Flower-class corvette
