= HMS Sphinx =

Six ships (and one shore establishment) of the Royal Navy have borne the name HMS Sphinx or HMS Sphynx, after the mythical creature, the Sphinx:

- HMS Sphinx (1748) was a 24-gun sixth rate launched in 1748 and sold in 1770.
- HMS Sphinx (1775) was a 20-gun sixth rate launched in 1775. The French captured her in September 1779, but HMS Proserpine recaptured her on 29 November 1779. She was broken up in 1811.
- HMS Sphynx (1815) was a 10-gun Cherokee-class brig-sloop launched in 1815 that became a Post Office Packet Service packet, sailing out of Falmouth, Cornwall. She was sold in 1835.
- HMS Sphinx (1846) was a wooden paddle sloop launched in 1846 and broken up in 1881.
- HMS Sphinx (1882) was a composite paddle vessel launched in 1882 and sold in 1919.
- HMS Sphinx (J69) was an Halcyon-class minesweeper launched in 1939 that foundered in 1940 after an air attack.
- HMS Sphinx was the name given to a naval accommodation camp in Alexandria, Egypt, from April 1941.
