= HMS Sea Rider =

History

England
- Name: HMS Sea Rider
- Acquired: Captured in 1665
- Fate: Sold in 1688

General characteristics
- Class & type: 8-gun flyboat
- Tons burthen: 350 (bm)
- Armament: 8 guns

HMS Sea Rider was an 8-gun flyboat of the Royal Navy, captured in 1665, commissioned into the navy, and sold in 1668.
