= HMS Sulphur =

Three ships of the Royal Navy have borne the name HMS Sulphur:

- HMS Sulphur (1778) was an 8-gun fireship purchased in 1778 and sold in 1783.
- HMS Sulphur (1797) was an 8-gun bomb vessel, previously in civilian service as the Severn. She was purchased in 1797 and sold in 1816.
- HMS Sulphur (1826) was a 10-gun bomb vessel launched in 1826. She was used as a survey ship from 1835, and for harbour service from 1843. She was broken up in 1857.
