= HMS Saint Christopher (1806) =

Sloop of the Royal Navy

History

France
- Name: Mohawk
- Launched: 1805
- Captured: 1806

United Kingdom
- Name: HMS Saint Christopher
- Acquired: 1806 (by capture)
- Fate: Broken up 1811

General characteristics
- Type: Sloop
- Tons burthen: 279 (bm)
- Armament: 16 × 18-pounder carronades + 2 × 6-pounder chase guns

HMS Saint Christopher (or St Christopher, or St Christopher's) was the French privateer Mohawk, launched in 1805, that the Royal Navy captured in 1806. The citizens of Saint Kitts (Saint Christopher Island), purchased her and donated her to the Royal Navy. She was broken up at Antigua in 1811.

== Service ==
Mohawk was a French privateer launched in 1805 that the British captured on 17 March 1806. The citizens of Saint Christopher Island purchased her and presented her to the Navy,.

On 15 August 1806 Lieutenant John Tancock was promoted to Commander into Saint Christopher. He commissioned her that month in Antigua. He would remain her commander until late in 1808.

At some point, probably in December, Lieutenant Andrew Hodge took temporary command of St Christopher. (Note: Lieutenant Andrew Hodge received promotion to the rank of Commander on 4 December 1807.)

At daylight on 2 January 1807, Saint Christopher was under Hodge's command and about three miles off Saint Bartholomew's when she encountered and gave chase to three French privateers. They separated, with the result that she could only capture one. The prize turned out to be the sloop Entreprenante, of one small gun and seventeen men. The two other privateers escaped into Great Bay, St. Martin's.

Tancock had returned to command of Saint Christopher by 18 July when she captured the schooner Henrietta Adelaide, Lind, master. Then on 12 September St Christopher captured the schooner Julia and Sally, De Gasy, master. (Note: A seaman's share of the prize money for Henrietta Adelaide was 8s 0¼d. A seaman's share of the prize (or possibly salvage) money for Julia was 3s 1¼d.) On 6 October St Christopher captured the Danish schooner Speculator.

Next, St Christopher served in the squadron under Rear-Admiral Alexander Cochrane, in Belleisle, that was sent to occupy the Danish West Indies. The actual occupation of the Danish West Indies did not occur until 7 December, after receipt of news of the second battle of Copenhagen. (Note: A first class share of the prize money awarded in 1816, i.e., the share accruing to Tancock and each of the other captains and commanders, was worth £398 10s 3½d; a fifth-class share, that of a seaman in the fleet, was worth £1 18s 10d.)

Late in 1808, a bad attack of yellow fever forced Tancock to return to Britain. A biography credited him with having captured several small Spanish vessels, detained a Danish ship that was condemned as a droit of admiralty, and recaptured a British vessel that had been carrying bale goods from Glasgow to St Thomas's.

Lieutenant Francis Alexander Halliday received promotion to Commander on 29 August 1808, and took command of St Christopher in September. He was her captain on 27 November when she captured Exchange. (Note: A first-class share was worth £239 10s 8½d; a sixth-class share, that of an ordinary seaman, was worth £7 5s 7¼d.)

In September 1809, Commander Smith replaced Halliday. However, Admiral Cochrane appointed Henry Nathaniel Rowe acting commander of St Christopher on 19 December; the appointment was confirmed in May 1810. (Note: O'Byrne reports that Rowe commanded St Christopher at the invasion of Guadeloupe (28 January 1810 to 6 February). However, she is not among the vessels named in the announcement in 1847 of the Admiralty award of the Naval General Service Medal with clasp "Guadaloupe" awarded upon application to all British participants still living in 1847.)

In May Rowe transferred to Asp, then under the command of Commander William M'Culloch. Rowe sailed Asp back to Britain with dispatches, and M'Culloch assumed command of St Christopher. On 18 February 1811 St Christopher captured the Spanish slave ship San Josef y Animas. (Note: San Jose y Animas was a schooner owned by Ezequiel Madan, with Juan Villas y Apriera, master. She had left on her slaving voyage on 11 June 1810, gathered slaves at the Gambia, and had sailed from Africa on 9 August. After Saint Christopher captured her, San Jose y Animas arrived at Antigua with 211 slaves. She was condemned there.)

== Fate ==
St Christopher was broken up at Antigua in 1811.
