= HMS Stonecrop =

Two ships of the Royal Navy have been named Stonecrop, after the Sedum flower:

- Stonecrop was one of the disguised identities of the Q-ship Glenfoyle, a former collier built in 1913 and sunk in 1917.
- HMS Stonecrop (K142) was a Flower-class corvette, launched in 1941 and sold in 1947.
