= HMS Redbridge =

Several vessels of the British Royal Navy have been named HMS Redridge:

- HMS Redbridge (1798) was one of four schooner-rigged gunboats built to an experimental design by Sir Samuel Bentham. Her launch date is unknown, but the Admiralty purchased her in April 1798. She had a short, relatively uneventful career before the French captured her in 1803. The French Navy sold her in January 1814.
- HMS Redbridge (1803) was the French privateer cutter Oiseau, which had been commissioned at Rochefort in August 1803. HMS Argo captured her in September 1803. The Royal Navy took her into service as HMS Redbridge. She foundered at Jamaica in February 1805.
- HMS Redbridge (1804) was the mercantile Union that the Royal Navy purchased in 1804. She wrecked at Nassau, Bahamas in November 1806.
- HMS Redbridge (1807) was the French schooner Aristotle, built in America. The Royal Navy took her into service as HMS Redbridge in 1807 and renamed her HMS Variable in 1808. It sold her in 1814.
