= HMS Tarpon =

HMS Tarpon has been the name of more than one ship of the British Royal Navy, and may refer to:

- HMS Tarpon (1917), a destroyer launched in 1917 and sold in 1927
- HMS Tarpon (N17), a submarine launched in 1939 and sunk in 1940
