= HMS Termagant =

Seven ships of the Royal Navy have borne the name HMS Termagant, after Termagant, a god that Medieval Europeans believed Muslims worshipped, and that later came to be popularised by Shakespeare to mean a bullying person:

- HMS Termagant (1780) was a 26-gun sixth rate launched in 1780, reduced to an 18-gun sloop in 1782, and sold in 1795.
- HMS Termagant (1796) was an 18-gun sloop launched in 1796 and sold in 1819.
- HMS Termagant (1822) was a 28-gun sixth rate launched in 1822. She was renamed HMS Herald in 1824. when she became a survey ship. She was sold in 1862.
- HMS Termagant (1838) was a 3-gun brigantine, previously built as a Cherokee-class brig-sloop. She was launched in 1838, and sold in 1845.
- HMS Termagant (1847) was a wooden screw frigate, launched in 1847 and sold in 1867.
- HMS Termagant (1915) was a Talisman-class destroyer, originally built for the Turkish Navy but taken over as HMS Narborough, later renamed HMS Termagant and launched in 1915. She was sold in 1921 and broken up in 1923.
- HMS Termagant (R89) was a T-class destroyer launched in 1943. She was converted to a Type 16 frigate between 1952 and 1953, and was broken up in 1965.
