= HMS Steady =

Five vessels of the Royal Navy have been named HMS Steady:

- HMS Steady (1782) was a 14-gun store ship purchased in 1782 and sold in 1784
- HMS Steady (1797) was a 12-gun Courser-class gun-brig built in 1797, renamed Oroonoko in 1805 and sold in 1806
- HMS Steady (1804) was a 12-gun Archer-class gun-brig built in 1804 and sold in 1815
- HMS Steady (1860) was a Philomel-class gunvessel built in 1860 and sold in 1870
- HMS Steady (1959) was the M-class minelayer Miner VII, renamed and reclassified as a trials vessel in 1959 and sold in 1980
