= HMS Serpent =

Ten ships of the Royal Navy have borne the name HMS Serpent, after the synonym for snake, whilst another two were planned, and one appears to have been a spurious report:

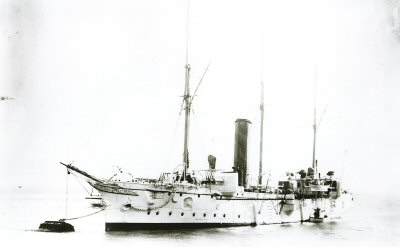
HMS Serpent (1887)

- HMS Serpent (1562) was a 60-ton pinnace captured in 1562 and last recorded in 1653.
- HMS Serpent (1693) was a 12-gun bomb vessel launched in 1693 and wrecked in 1694. She ran aground in Gibraltar Bay during a storm and was wrecked; 15 men died.
- HMS Serpent (1695) was a 4-gun bomb vessel launched in 1695 and captured by a French privateer in 1703.
- HMS Serpent (1742) was a bomb vessel (carrying 2 mortars and 8 guns) launched in 1742 and wrecked in 1748. She was Heading for Barbados when she ran aground on the island. Despite efforts to lighten her, her crew had to abandon her and were ferried ashore over a three-day period; seven drowned when their boat overturned. The loss was blamed on strong currents.
- HMS Serpent was a 12-gun bomb vessel reported as being built in 1771, but no such vessel was built.
- HMS Serpent was to have been a 16-gun ship-sloop. She was laid down in February 1783 and cancelled in October of that year when the builder (Phineas Jacobs of Sandgate) went out of business.
- HMS Serpent (1789) was a 16-gun ship-sloop launched in 1789 that foundered in September 1806 on the Jamaica station.
- HMS Serpent (1793) was a French gun-boat taken at Toulon in 1793, and in September commissioned and given a crew of 26 men from Victory under the command of Lieutenant John Davie; the British scuttled her at the evacuation of the city on 18 December.
- HMS Serpent (1794) was a 4-gun gun vessel, formerly a Dutch hoy purchased in 1794. She paid off in 1796 and is believed to have been sold around 1802.
- HMS Serpent was to have been an 18-gun sloop, laid down in 1810 and cancelled later that year.
- HMS Serpent (1832) was a 16-gun brig-sloop launched in 1832. She was used as a target from 1857 and was broken up in 1861.
- HMS Serpent (1860) was a wood screw gunvessel launched in 1860 and sold in 1875. Surveyed Pratas Island in 1867.
- HMS Serpent (1887) was a torpedo cruiser launched in 1887 and wrecked in November 1890 near Camariñas with the loss of 173 of her crew of 176 men. The cause was an error in judgment on the part of those responsible for the ship's navigation. Still, her officers and men obeyed orders and maintained good discipline to the end, with her officers obeying the Captain's orders to "stand by the ship", and going down with her.
