= HMS Seabear =

Two vessels of the British Royal Navy have been named HMS Seabear:

- HMS Seabear (1918) was an S-class destroyer launched at John Brown, Clydebank on 6 July 1918 and sold for scrap in February 1931.
- HMS Seabear (1943) was an Algerine-class minesweeper launched at Redfern on 6 November 1943. The ship was originally to have been named HMS St Thomas but was renamed in 1943. It arrived at Preston for breaking up on 12 December 1958.
