= HMS Satyr =

Two ships of the Royal Navy have been named HMS Satyr, after the figure from mythology:

- HMS Satyr (1916) was an R-class destroyer, launched in 1916. She served in the First World War and was broken up in 1926.
- HMS Satyr (P214) was an S-class submarine, launched on 28 September 1942 and which served in the Second World War. She was lent to the French Navy and renamed Saphir, and scrapped in April 1962.
