= HMS Trouncer =

Two ships of the British Royal Navy have been named HMS Trouncer :

- HMS Trouncer (D85) was a Ruler-class escort carrier launched as USS Perdido in 1943 and transferred to the Royal Navy under Lend lease as HMS Trouncer. She was returned to the USN in 1946 and then sold into merchant service. She was scrapped in 1973.
- HMS Trouncer (1947) was a Landing Ship, Tank launched in 1945 as HMS LST 3523. She was renamed HMS Trouncer in 1947. Transferred to the Ministry of Transport in 1956 and renamed Empire Gull. Transferred to the RFA in 1970 under the same name but with a pennant of LST 3513. She was broken up in 1980.
