= HMS Surly (1855) =

British Royal Navy mortar vessel

History

United Kingdom
- Name: HMS Surly
- Ordered: 6 October 1854
- Builder: Money Wigram & Son, Blackwall Yard
- Laid down: 9 October 1854
- Launched: 31 March 1855
- Renamed: MV9 on 19 October 1855
- Fate: Broken up in November 1863

General characteristics
- Tons burthen: 11723/94 (bm)
- Length: 65 feet (20 m) (gundeck); 52 feet 5 1/4 inches (15.983 m) (keel)
- Beam: 20 feet 10 inches (6.35 m)
- Depth of hold: 7 feet 6 inches (2.29 m)
- Armament: 1x mortar

HMS Surly was a mortar vessel of the Royal Navy built at Blackwall Yard in 1855. Later that year she served with Anglo-French forces at the Bombardment of Sveaborg, Finland, during the Crimean War. Her mortar, and those of the other vessels deployed, required several repairs but the bombardment had a greater effect than had been anticipated. Despite this mortar vessels fell out of use in the Royal Navy due to the development of rifled artillery. After being renamed MV9 later in 1855 she was broken up in November 1863.

== Construction ==
HMS Surly was ordered by the Admiralty on 6 October 1854 and was constructed at Blackwall Yard by Money Wigram & Son. Her keel was laid down on 9 October and she was launched on 31 March 1855. Surly cost £2,360 to construct plus £825 for the Admiralty to fit her out and an additional £280 in supplies from Admiralty stores. She was 65 feet (20 m) in length at her gundeck and 52 feet 5 1/4 inches (15.983 m) at the level of her keel. She was 20 feet 10 inches (6.35 m) in beam and had 7 feet 6 inches (2.29 m) of depth in her hold. Surly's capacity was 11723/94 tons burthen. She was armed with a single mortar cast by the Carron Company.

== Service ==
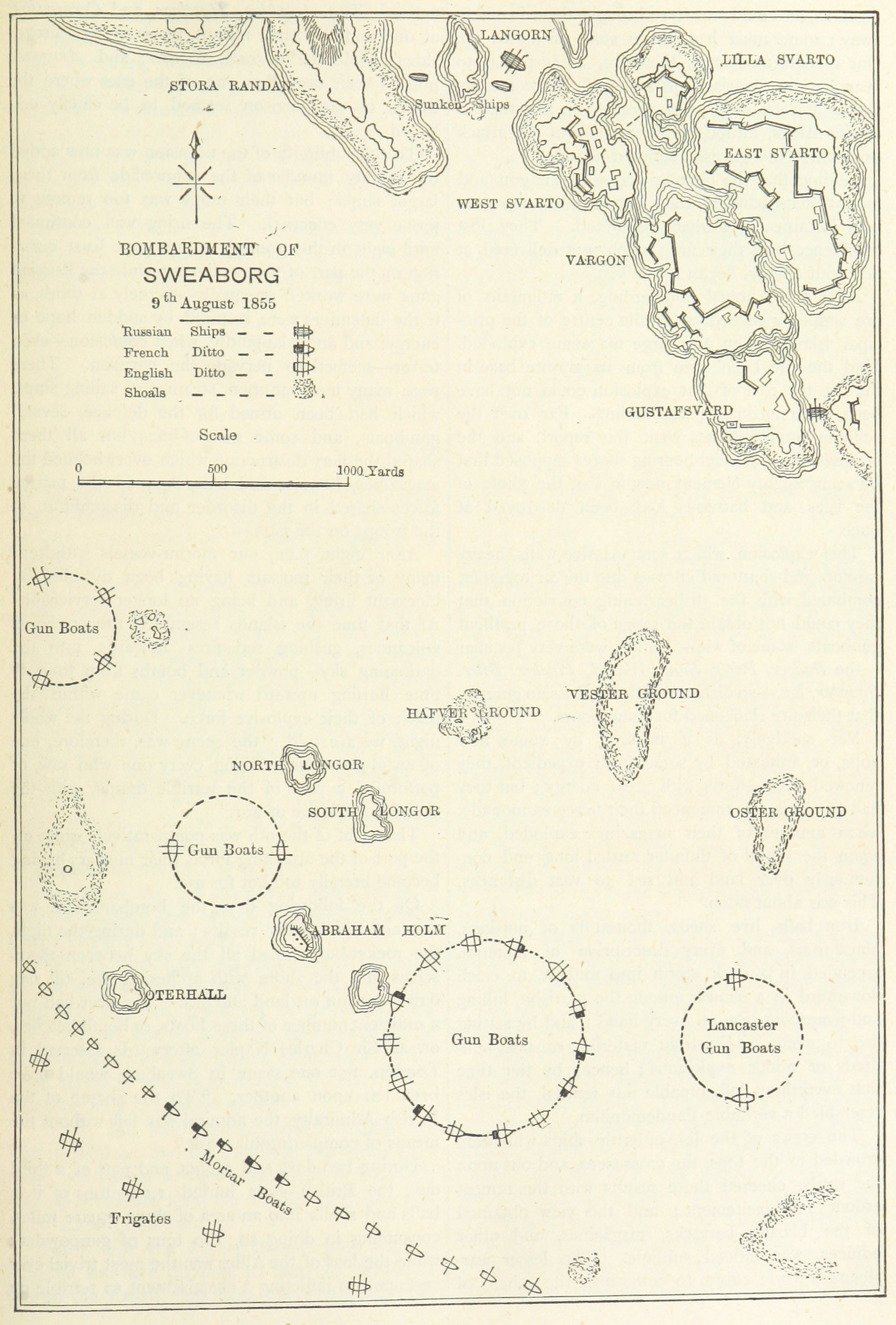
Ship positions during the bombardment of Sweaborg; the mortar vessels, including Surly are at lower left

In 1855 Surly was deployed to the Baltic Sea during the Crimean War fought by Britain, France and the Ottoman Empire against Russia. Commanded by a petty officer, she was one of a number of mortar vessels that participated in the Bombardment of Sveaborg, Finland. The mortars used by the Royal Navy in this action suffered from a number of defects. Surly's mortar destroyed its suspension gear, which allowed it to be trained onto a target independent of the orientation of the ship, on its first firing. After firing 14 rounds it was taken out of action for repairs to cracks at the base of its chamber. These were temporarily patched by pouring in a mixture of tin and zinc, after which a further 34 shells were fired before the mortar required repair again. A final 30 shells were fired before the vent of the mortar was blown. In addition during the second day of the bombardment the mortar had to be reinforced with chains to prevent the barrel from bursting after the original reinforcing band gave way.

Despite similar issues on the other British mortar vessels it was later deemed that the mortars had performed better than expected in inflicting damage upon the defences. The 3,141 shells fired over two days destroyed two powder magazines, two shell magazines, a rope store, a hospital store, two granaries, a pitch factory, the house and office of the governor-general and 17 private houses. Some 2,000 Russian/Finnish people were killed, with 55 British and French men killed and 204 wounded. Despite the success the occasion marked the last use of mortars in action by the Royal Navy, being supplanted by the development of rifled artillery.

Surly was renamed MV9 (presumably for "mortar vessel 9") on 19 October 1855. This allowed the navy to reuse the name HMS Surly for an Albacore-class gunboat ordered on 4 October 1855 and laid down on 15 October. MV9 was broken up in November 1863.
