= Trelandvean =

British merchant ship and Royal Navy tender (1767–1792)

History

Great Britain
- Name: Trelandvean
- Launched: 1767, Swansea
- Fate: Wrecked 22 December 1792

General characteristics
- Tons burthen: 120 (bm), after lengthening in 1772
- Sail plan: Snow; later brig

Trelandvean was a merchant vessel launched in 1767 at Swansea, possibly under another name. Between probably 1777 and 1783 she served the Royal Navy as a ship's tender. She then returned to mercantile service. She may have made one voyage as a whaler in the southern whale fishery, before she was wrecked in the Mediterranean in 1792.

== Career ==
The ship arrival and departure (SAD) data from Lloyd's List gives some sense of her Trelandvean's early career. In 1768 Trelandvean, Dunsterville, master, arrived at Falmouth from Wales. In both 1771 and 1772, she was reported to have returned to Falmouth from Petersburg. The next year she was reported to have sailed for Nantes from Falmouth. On 8 April 1774 she arrived back at Falmouth from Naples. In 1775 she arrived at Oporto from South Carolina.

Trelandvean first appeared in copies of Lloyd's Register (LR), in 1776.

Year	Master	Owner	Trade	Source & notes
1776	Dunsterville	Falmouth	Oporto–Bristol	LR; lengthened 1772
1778	Dunsterville	Falmouth	Oporto–Bristol	LR; lengthened 1772

By one report, between 1 March 1771 and 31 October 1783, Trelandvean served the Royal Navy as a hired ship's tender. The reported start date for the contract is probably in error. She did not appear in Lloyd's List's SAD data between 1776 and 1781; on 3 December 1782 Trelandvean Tender, Burrow, master, arrived at Waterford from Cork. Burrow was possibly Lieutenant John Burrows, who reportedly commanded Trelandvean from 3 March 1777 to 29 June 1778, and presumably again later. (Note: Burrow's command commencing in March 1777 suggests that Trelandvean's contract may have commenced in March 1777, not March 1771.) At some point Henry Parkin also commanded "His Majesty's Tender Trelandvean".

On 11 March 1784, i.e., after the expiration of the contract with the Admiralty, Trelandvean, Dunsterville, master, arrived at Penzance, from Cadiz. On 22 May she arrived at Cowes from Petersburg. Thereafter, she traded with the Baltic.

In 1786 Trelandvean, Williams, master, was reported to have arrived at Ancona from Falmouth.

Trelandvean had disappeared from the extant issues of Lloyd's Register between 1779-1785. She returned to Lloyd's Register (LR), in 1786.

Year	Master	Owner	Trade	Source & notes
1786	Nicholas	Heams & Co.	Straits–Bristol	LR; lengthened 1772
1789	Nicholas	Heams & Co.	Straits–Bristol	LR; lengthened 1772

In August 1789 the snow Trelandvean was scheduled to be auctioned while lying at Penryn, Cornwall. From 1790 she no longer appeared in Lloyd's Register, though she did appear in Lloyd's List.

In June 1790 Lloyd's List reported that Trelandvean, Cornish, master, had returned to Falmouth from the South Seas.

In March 1791, Lloyd's List reported that Trelandrean, Cornish, master, had sprung a leak in the Downs while sailing from Liverpool to London. She had put into Dover for repairs. After she had been repaired she was loaded and ready to sail when the sluices were opened and she was pushed onto a bank. She sustained so much damage that she had to unload and undergo a second repair.

== Loss ==
Trelandvean, Cornish, master, was among the vessels wrecked at Galipoli, Italy on 22 December 1792 in a gale there. Earlier she had been reported at Leghorn and Naples.
