= HMS Sandwich =

Six ships of the Royal Navy have borne the name HMS Sandwich, either after the English seaside town of Sandwich, or one of the holders of the title Earl of Sandwich, particularly Vice-Admiral Edward Montagu, 1st Earl of Sandwich, or First Lord of the Admiralty John Montagu, 4th Earl of Sandwich. A seventh ship was planned, but never completed:

- HMS Sandwich (1679) was a 90-gun second rate launched in 1679. She was rebuilt in 1712 and hulked in 1752. She was broken up in 1770.
- HMS Sandwich (1759) was a 98-gun second rate launched in 1759. She was converted to a floating battery in 1780, and used for harbour service from 1790. She was broken up in 1810.
- HMS Sandwich (1780) was a 24-gun armed ship, formerly the civilian Marjory. The Royal Navy purchased her in 1780 but on 24 August 1781 she had the misfortune to encounter the French fleet under Admiral de Grasse of the coast of the Carolinas. The French 74-gun Souverain captured her. The French sold her in North America in December.
- HMS Sandwich was the 12-gun hired armed cutter Sandwich that the Royal Navy hired in 1798, the French captured in 1799, and the Royal Navy recaptured in 1803, purchased in 1804, commissioned in 1805, and sold in 1805.
- HMS Sandwich was a 12-gun schooner purchased in 1805 as HMS Pitt. She was renamed HMS Sandwich in 1807 and was broken up in 1809.
- HMS Sandwich was to have been a 74-gun third rate. She was laid down in 1809 but was cancelled in 1811.
- HMS Sandwich (L12) was a Bridgewater-class sloop launched in 1928 and sold for breaking up in 1946.

== See also ==
- Hired armed lugger Sandwich
