= HMS Salisbury =

Seven ships of the Royal Navy have been named HMS Salisbury after the city of Salisbury in Wiltshire:

- HMS Salisbury (1698) was a 48-gun fourth rate, launched in 1698 and captured by the French in 1703. She was subsequently recaptured in 1708 and renamed Salisbury Prize, and later renamed Preston in 1716. She was broken up in 1749.
- HMS Salisbury (1707) was a 54-gun fourth rate launched in 1707, rebuilt in 1726 and sold in 1749.
- HMS Salisbury (1746) was a 50-gun fourth rate launched in 1746 and condemned in 1761.
- HMS Salisbury (1769) was a 50-gun fourth rate launched in 1769 and grounded and surrendered to the Spanish in 1796 at Avache Island, Santo Domingo.
- HMS Salisbury (1814) was a 58-gun fourth rate launched in 1814 and sold in 1837.
- HMS Salisbury (I52) was originally the American destroyer USS Claxton, transferred to the Royal Navy in 1940. She was lent to the Royal Canadian Navy in 1942 and sold to them in 1944.
- HMS Salisbury (F32) was a Salisbury-class or Type 61 aircraft direction frigate launched in 1953 and expended as a target in 1985.
