= HMS Sheldrake =

HMS Sheldrake may refer to one of several Royal Navy ships named after the Sheldrake duck:

- HMS Sheldrake (1806) was a Seagull-class brig-sloop launched in 1806 and sold in 1817.
- HMS Sheldrake (1825) was a Cherokee-class brig-sloop launched in 1825 that became a Post Office Packet Service packet, sailing out of Falmouth, Cornwall. She was sold in 1855.
- HMS Sheldrake (1855) was a gunboat of the Albacore class built by W & H Pitcher in Northfleet and launched in 1855 and sold in 1865 in Montevideo. In 1861 she was deployed in the South Atlantic during the Christie crisis with Brazil.
- HMS Sheldrake (1875) was a Forester-class gunboat launched in 1875. Renamed HMS Drake in 1888 and WV 29 in 1893, the vessel reverted to HMS Drake in 1906 before being sold later that year.
- HMS Sheldrake (1889) was a Sharpshooter-class torpedo gunboat launched in 1889 and sold for breaking in 1907.
- HMS Sheldrake (1911) was an Acorn-class destroyer launched in 1911 and sold for breaking up in 1921.
- HMS Sheldrake (L06) was a Kingfisher-class sloop launched in 1937 and sold in 1946.
