= HMS Severn =

Nine ships of the Royal Navy have been named HMS Severn after the River Severn:

- The first HMS Severn (1695) was a 50-gun fourth rate launched in 1695, rebuilt in 1739, captured by the French in 1746, and recaptured by the Royal Navy in 1747 but not taken back into service.
- The second HMS Severn (1747) was a 50-gun fourth rate launched in 1747 and sold in 1759.
- The next HMS Severn was to have been a 38-gun fifth rate. She was renamed HMS Tagus before her launch.
- The third HMS Severn (1786) was a 44-gun Adventure-class fifth rate launched in 1786 and wrecked in 1804.
- The fourth HMS Severn (1813) was a 40-gun Endymion-class fourth rate launched in 1813 and sold in 1825.
- The next HMS Severn was to have been a 46-gun fifth rate. She was ordered in 1825 but cancelled in 1831.
- The fifth HMS Severn (1856) was a 50-gun fourth rate launched in 1856, one of the last sail frigates. She was converted to screw propulsion in 1860 and was broken up in 1876.
- The sixth HMS Severn (1885) was a Mersey-class protected cruiser launched in 1885 and sold in 1905.
- The seventh HMS Severn (1914) was a Humber-class monitor, launched for Brazil in 1913 but purchased in 1914 and sold in 1921, being scrapped in 1923.
- The eighth HMS Severn (N57) was a Thames-class submarine launched in 1934 and scrapped in 1946.
- The ninth and latest HMS Severn (P282) is a River-class patrol vessel launched in 2002.

== Battle honours ==
- Algiers 1816
- Belgian Coast 1914
- Konigsberg 1915
- Sicily 1943
- Aegean 1943
- Norway 1940
- Atlantic 1940–1941
