= HMS Sunflower =

Two ships of the Royal Navy have been named HMS Sunflower:

- HMS Sunflower (1915) was an Acacia-class sloop launched in 1915 and sold in 1921
- HMS Sunflower (K41) was a Flower-class corvette, launched in 1940 and sold in 1947
