= HMS Sentinel =

Five ships of the Royal Navy have borne the name HMS Sentinel:

- HMS Centinel (1804) was a 12-gun brig, formerly named Friendship. She was purchased in 1804 and wrecked in the Baltic in 1812.
- HMS Sentinel (1904) was a Sentinel-class scout cruiser launched in 1904 and sold in 1923.
- HMS Sentinel was an S-class destroyer, renamed HMS Scorpion before being launched in 1942.
- HMS Sentinel (P256) was an S-class submarine launched in 1945 and scrapped in 1962.
- HMS Sentinel (1975) was a patrol vessel purchased in 1983. She was previously named Seaforth Warrior and Edda Sun. She was commissioned in 1984 and paid off in 1992. She was sold in 1993.
