= HMS Tourmaline =

Five ships of the Royal Navy have been named HMS Tourmaline:

- HMS Tourmaline (1875), an Emerald-class corvette launched in 1875 she was converted to a coal hulk in 1899 and renamed C.115 in 1904. She was sold in 1920
- HMS Tourmaline (1919), an S-class destroyer launched in 1919 and sold in 1931
- HMS Tourmaline (1935), a Gem-class ASW trawler T41 launched in 1935 and lost in 1941

HMS Tourmaline (J339), a Catherine-class minesweeper launched in 1942 as USS Usage she was transferred and renamed in 1943 on completion. Returned to the United States in 1947 she was subsequently transferred to Turkey as TCG Çardak

- HMS Tourmaline (R62), a C-class destroyer renamed Cassandra before being laid down
