= HMS Shannon =

Nine ships of the Royal Navy have borne the name HMS Shannon, after the River Shannon, the longest river in Ireland:

- HMS Shannon (1757) was a 28-gun sixth rate launched in 1757 and broken up 1765.
- HMS Shannon (1796) was a 32-gun fifth-rate frigate launched in 1796 and sold in 1802.
- HMS Shannon (1803) was a 36-gun fifth rate launched in September 1803. She had been intended to be called HMS Pallas, but was renamed in 1802 before being launched. She ran ashore in December that year and was burnt to avoid capture.
- HMS Shannon (1806) was a 38-gun fifth rate launched in 1806 and noted for her defeat of USS Chesapeake. Converted into a receiving ship in 1832, she was renamed HMS St Lawrence in 1844 and broken up in 1859.
- HMS Shannon (1814) was a 10-gun schooner listed on the Canadian Great Lakes in 1814.
- HMS Shannon (1832) was a 2-gun Indian schooner on the Navy List in 1832.
- HMS Shannon (1855) was a wooden-hulled screw frigate launched in 1855 and sold in 1871.
- HMS Shannon (1875) was an ironclad screw frigate intended to operate largely under sail far from friendly ports, and as such was the first British armoured cruiser. She was launched in 1875 and sold for scrapping in 1899.
- HMS Shannon (1906) was a Minotaur-class armoured cruiser launched in 1906 and sold in 1922.
