= HMS Scotsman =

Two ships of the Royal Navy have borne the name HMS Scotsman, after an inhabitant of Scotland:

- HMS Scotsman (1918) was an S-class destroyer launched in 1918. She was handed over to Ward shipbreakers in 1937 in part payment for RMS Majestic.
- HMS Scotsman (P243) was an S-class submarine launched in 1944 and broken up in 1964.
