= HMS Sans Pareil =

Three ships of the Royal Navy have been named HMS Sans Pareil, after the French meaning 'without equal':

- HMS Sans Pareil (1794) was an 80-gun third-rate ship of the line, formerly the French ship Sans Pareil launched in 1793. She was captured in 1794 during the battle of the Glorious First of June, hulked in 1810 and broken up in 1842.
- HMS Sans Pareil (1851) was a screw-driven 81-gun second-rate ship of the line launched in 1851 and sold in 1867.
- HMS Sans Pareil (1887) was a Victoria-class battleship launched in 1887 and scrapped in 1907.
