= HMS Tracker =

Three vessels of the British Royal Navy have been named HMS Tracker:

- HMS Tracker (D24), an Attacker-class escort carrier built in the US and completed in 1943. She saw extensive action in 1943 with the Western Approaches Command covering Atlantic, Mediterranean and Russian convoys.
- HMS Tracker (LST-3522), a landing ship tank built towards the end of World War II. In 1952 she acted as the hospital ship for the first British atomic bomb test, (Operation Hurricane), which took place off the north-west coast of Australia.
- HMS Tracker (P274), an Archer-class patrol and training vessel.
