= HMS Roberts =

Two ships of the Royal Navy have borne the name HMS Roberts, after Field Marshal Frederick Roberts:

- HMS Roberts (1915) was an Abercrombie-class monitor launched in 1915. She was initially named HMS Stonewall Jackson, then HMS M4, and then HMS Earl Roberts, before finally being named HMS Roberts. She was sold in 1921, but was retained. She was handed over in 1936 in exchange for a training ship and was then scrapped.
- HMS Roberts (F40) was a Roberts-class monitor, launched in 1941. She was reduced to harbour service in 1956 and was sold for scrapping in 1965.
