= HMS Tormentor =

Three vessels and two shore establishments of the Royal Navy have borne the title of HMS Tormentor:

- HMS Tormentor (1794) was a vessel purchased in the West Indies that served as a gunboat at the capture of Martinique, St Lucia, and Guadeloupe in 1794; her fate is unknown. Her crew qualified for the Naval General Service Medal with clasp "17 Mar. Boat Service 1794"
- HMS Tormentor (1917) was an R-class destroyer built by Stephen; launched 22 May 1917; sold for breaking up 19 November 1929, but wrecked off South Wales while under tow en route to breakers 13 December 1929.
- HMS Tormentor (1979) was a torpedo recovery vessel; she arrived at Swansea on 1 February 2012 for breaking up.
- HMS Tormentor (WWII shore establishment) was a shore establishment of the British Royal Navy during World War II, based near Warsash, on the River Hamble.
- HMS Tormentor II was a WWII training camp at Cowes, Isle of Wight
