= HMS Samarang =

Four ships of the Royal Navy have either borne the name HMS Samarang or were intended to bear the name, after the port of Samarang, the site of HMS Psyché's capture of several Dutch vessels there in 1807. (See also Raid on Griessie.)

- HMS Surinam was an 18-gun sloop, previously the French corvette Hussard or Hussar. She was captured in 1799, captured by the Dutch in 1803 but recaptured by the British in 1807 and re-added the following year; she may have been tentatively renamed Samarang, there being an HMS Surinam in service by then and Psyché's success being salient. She was listed until 1809.
- HMS Samarang was the 24-gun Dutch sloop Scipio, which Psyché captured at Samarang in 1807. She was renamed HMS Scipio and then HMS Samarang, and sold in 1814. She then traded between Liverpool and India until 1827.
- HMS Samarang was a Cruizer-class brig-sloop ordered in 1815, with the order being cancelled in 1820.
- HMS Samarang (1822) was a sixth-rate frigate launched in 1822 at Cochin, made a guardship in May 1847, and sold at Gibraltar in October 1883. She may still have been serving during World War II as an examination vessel at Gibraltar.
