= HMS Smiter =

HMS Smiter may refer to:

- HMS Smiter (D55), launched in 1943, was a Ruler-class escort carrier, originally built as USS Vermillion (CVE-52); served in World War II and was returned to the U.S. Navy in 1946
- HMS Smiter (L3514), a tank landing ship launched in 1944; renamed Smiter from LST 3514 in 1947; sold in 1949 and wrecked soon after
- HMS Smiter (P272), a P2000-class patrol vessel commissioned in February 1986; currently active
