= HMS Tower =

Three ships of the Royal Navy have borne the name HMS Tower:

- HMS Tower (1668) was a 4-gun smack purchased in 1668 and sold in 1674.
- HMS Tower (1809) was a 6-gun tender launched in 1809, lent to the Thames Police in 1817 and sold in 1825.
- HMS Tower (1917) was a modified R-class destroyer launched in 1917 and sold in 1928.
