= HMS Redbreast =

Several ships of the Royal Navy have borne the name HMS Redbreast, after the European robin.

- HMS Redbreast (1805), a 12-gun brig launched in 1805 and converted to a customs hulk in 1815, and later a hospital ship, scrapped in 1850.
- HMS Redbreast (1855), a mortar vessel launched in 1855, renamed MV-19 a few months later, and broken up in 1865.
- HMS Redbreast (1856), an Albacore-class screw gunboat launched in 1856 and broken up in 1864.
- HMS Redbreast (1889), a Redbreast-class gunboat launched in 1889 and scrapped in 1910.
- HMS Redbreast (1915), a requisitioned passenger/cargo ship, formerly SS Redbreast used as a messenger ship, fleet auxiliary and Q-ship during World War I, and torpedoed in July 1917.

The name may also refer to HMC Redbreast, a customs and excise cutter launched at Woolwich in 1817 and sold in 1850.
