= HMS Sesame =

Two vessels of the British Royal Navy have been named HMS Sesame:

- HMS Sesame (1918) was an S-class destroyer launched in 1918 and scrapped in 1934–1936
- HMS Sesame (W144) was an Assurance-class rescue tug torpedoed and sunk by a German E-boat off Normandy, France in June 1944
