= HMS Rifleman =

Six ships of the Royal Navy have borne the name HMS Rifleman:

- HMS Rifleman (1804) was a 12-gun gun-brig purchased in 1804 and sold in 1809.
- HMS Rifleman (1809) was an 18-gun Cruizer-class brig-sloop launched in 1809 and sold in 1836. She then became a whaler, making three whaling voyages between 1837 and 1856.
- HMS Rifleman (1846) was a 6-gun Rifleman-class wooden screw gunvessel launched in 1846 and sold in Hong Kong in 1869.
- HMS Rifleman (1872) was a Frolic-class composite screw gunvessel launched in 1872 and sold in 1890.
- HMS Rifleman (1910) was an Acorn-class destroyer completed in 1910 and sold for breaking in 1921.
- HMS Rifleman (J299) was an Algerine-class minesweeper completed in 1944. She was used as an accommodation ship in Barrow in 1970 and sold for breaking in 1972.
- A Weapon-class destroyer named HMS Rifle was laid down in 1944, but cancelled in 1945.
