= HMS Tees =

Four vessels of the Royal Navy have been named HMS Tees after the River Tees:

- HMS Tees (1817) was a 26-gun Conway-class post ship launched in 1817. She was used as a church ship from 1826 and sold at Liverpool in 1872.
- HMS Tees was to be a Camelion-class sloop ordered in 1860 but cancelled in 1863.
- HMS Tees (1876) was a Medina-class gunboat launched in 1876 and sold at Bristol in 1907.
- HMS Tees (K293) was a River-class frigate launched in 1943 and broken up in 1955.
