= HMS Traveller =

Three ships of the Royal Navy have borne the name HMS Traveller:

- HMS Traveller (1839) was a wooden paddle vessel purchased in 1839 and sold into mercantile service in 1844.
- HMS Traveller (1856) was an Albacore-class wooden screw gunboat launched in 1856 and broken up by 1863.
- HMS Traveller (1884) was an armed tug and special service vessel, purchased in 1885 and sold for further service in 1920
- HMS Traveller (N48) was a T-class submarine launched in 1941 and sunk by an unknown cause in 1942.
