= HMS Scylla =

Five vessels of the British Royal Navy have been named HMS Scylla, after the sea monster Scylla of Greek mythology.

- HMS Scylla (1809) was an 18-gun brig-sloop launched in 1809 and broken up 1846.
- HMS Scylla (1856) was a wooden screw corvette launched in 1856 and sold for breakup in 1882.
- HMS Scylla (1891) was an Apollo-class second class cruiser in service from 1891 to 1914.
- HMS Scylla (98) was a Dido-class light cruiser launched in 1940, seriously damaged by a mine in 1944, and sold in 1950.
- HMS Scylla (F71) was a Leander-class frigate in service from 1970 to 1993, and sunk as an artificial reef in 2004.
