= HMS Southdown =

Two ships of the Royal Navy have borne the name HMS Southdown:

- HMS Southdown (1917) was a Hunt-class minesweeper launched in 1917 and sold in 1926.
- HMS Southdown (L25) was a Hunt-class destroyer launched in 1940 and scrapped in 1956.
