= HMS Sabrina =

Four ships of the Royal Navy have borne the name HMS Sabrina. Another was planned but never completed:

- HMS Sabrina (1806) was an 18-gun Cormorant-class sloop, later classified as a 20-gun post ship. She was launched in 1806 and sold in 1816.
- HMS Sabrina (1838) was a schooner in service in 1838.
- HMS Sabrina was to have been a wooden screw sloop. She was ordered in 1860 but subsequently cancelled in 1863.
- HMS Sabrina (1876) was a Medina-class iron screw gunboat launched in 1876. She became a diving tender in 1916 and was renamed HMS Sabine, and then HMS Vivid in 1920. She was sold in 1922.
- HMS Sabrina (1916) was a Yarrow Later M-class destroyer launched in 1916 and sold in 1926.

The yacht Sabrina (built 1899, 379 GRT) was taken into service as HM Yacht Sabrina on 5 February 1915 and equipped with one 12-pdr gun and one 6-pdr gun. She was renamed to HM Yacht Sabrina II in December of that year.
