= HMS Torrington =

Three ships of the Royal Navy have borne the name HMS Torrington, while the name has also been used for one ship of the navy during the Commonwealth period:

- Torrington was a 62-gun ship launched in 1654. She was renamed Dreadnought in 1660, and foundered in 1690.
- HMS Torrington was a 32–gun fifth rate launched in 1676 as HMS Charles Galley. Charles Galley was renamed Torrington in 1729, was hulked in 1740 and sold in 1744.
- HMS Torrington (1743) was a 44-gun fifth rate launched in 1743 and sold in 1763.
- HMS Torrington (K577) was a Captain-class frigate launched in 1943 under lend-lease, and returned to the US Navy in 1946.
