= HMS Seawolf =

Two ships of the Royal Navy have borne the name HMS Seawolf:

- HMS Seawolf (1918) was an S-class destroyer launched in 1918 and sold in 1931.
- HMS Seawolf (47S) was an S-class submarine launched in 1935 and sold in 1945.

== See also ==
- Seawolf (disambiguation)
