= HMS Triad =

Two ships of the Royal Navy have been named HMS Triad

- HMS Triad (N88): a yacht that served as a headquarters ship during World War One and interwar Persian Gulf. She was sold in 1933
- HMS Triad (N53): a T-class submarine launched in 1939 and sunk in 1940.
