= HMS Relentless =

Two ships of the Royal Navy have borne the name HMS Relentless:

- HMS Relentless (1916) was a Yarrow M-class destroyer launched in 1916 and sold in 1926.
- HMS Relentless (H85) was a R-class destroyer launched in 1942. She was converted into a frigate in 1951 and scrapped in 1971.
