= HMS Redgauntlet =

There have been three ships of the Royal Navy named HMS Redgauntlet after the novel by Sir Walter Scott:

- HMS Redgauntlet (1913), a Laforey-class destroyer launched in 1913, renamed Laurel shortly after launch and scrapped in 1921.
- HMS Redgauntlet (1916), an R-class destroyer launched in 1916 and scrapped in 1926.
- HMS Redgauntlet II, a paddle steamer requisitioned by the Admiralty in 1916 as a minesweeper and sold in 1919.
