= HMS Thrush =

Three ships of the Royal Navy have borne the name HMS Thrush, after the Thrush, a type of bird:

- HMS Thrush (1806) was an 18-gun brig-sloop, previously the Revenue brig Prince of Wales. She was renamed HMS Thrush in 1806, was used as a powder hulk from 1809 and was wrecked in 1815 and subsequently sold.
- HMS Thrush (1856) was a Clown-class screw gunboat launched in 1856 and broken up by 1864.
- HMS Thrush (1889) was a Redbreast-class first class gunboat launched in 1889. She was transferred to the Coastguard in 1906, used as a cable ship from 1915, a salvage ship from 1916 and was wrecked in 1917.
