= HMS Tartarus =

List of ships with the same or similar names

Three ships of the Royal Navy have borne the name HMS Tartarus, after Tartarus, from Greek mythology. A fourth was laid down, but never completed:

- HMS Tartarus (1797) was an 8-gun bomb vessel, launched in 1792 at Newcastle as the mercantile Charles Dawson. The Navy purchased her in 1797. She was wrecked in 1804.
- HMS Tartarus (1806) was a 16-gun fireship launched in 1806. She was reclassified as a sloop from 1808 and was sold in 1816.
- HMS Tartarus (1834) was a Tartarus-class paddle gunvessel launched in 1834 and broken up in 1860.
- HMS Tartarus was to have been a Cormorant-class wooden screw gunvessel, laid down in 1860 and cancelled in 1864.
