= HMS Solitaire =

HMS Solitaire may refer to:

This list may be incomplete.

- French ship Solitaire (1774) was captured by the Royal Navy in 1784 and renamed HMS Solitaire. She was sold out of the navy in 1790.
- HMS Solitaire (1904) was a tug which capsized and sank in 1944.
