= HMS Selby =

Three vessels of the British Royal Navy have been named HMS Selby, after the North Yorkshire town:

- English ship Selby (1654) was a 22-gun ship launched at Wapping in 1654 and renamed Eagle in 1660. Converted to a fireship in 1674, she was sunk in 1694 to help form foundations at Sheerness.
- HMS Selby was a storeship purchased in April 1781 and sold on 2 December 1783.
- HMS Selby (1798) was the mercantile Selby, launched in 1791 in Whitby, purchased in 1798 for service as a 22-gun ship, and sold in December 1801. She then returned to mercantile service as the West Indiaman Selby, and was probably wrecked in February 1807; she was last listed in 1810.
