= Spindrift (disambiguation) =

Spindrift is a weather effect.

Spindrift may also refer to:

== Boats and ships ==
- Spindrift 13, a 1965 Canadian sailboat design
- HMSAS Spindrift, a captured WWII German merchant raider called Polaris, transferred to the South African Naval Forces in 1940 and renamed HMSAS Skilpad

== Brands and enterprises ==
- Adnams Spindrift, a beer brewed by Adnams Brewery
- Spindrift Beverage Co., a beverage company

== Fictional entities ==
- Spindrift, a fictional novel written by the character Lady Florence Cray in the Jeeves stories
- Spindrift, a fictional ship in Land of the Giants

== Geography ==
- Spindrift Alley, a gully on the mountain Nanda Devi

== Literature ==
- Spindrift (novel), a science fiction novel

== Music ==
- Spindrift (band), a rock band
- "Spindrift" (song), a song by Rush
