= HMS Swordfish =

Three ships of the Royal Navy have been named HMS Swordfish after the fish.

- HMS Swordfish (1895) was a 330-ton destroyer launched in 1895 and sold in 1910.
- HMS Swordfish (1916) was a steam-powered submarine launched in 1916. She was converted into a surface patrol boat in 1917 and renamed S1.
- HMS Swordfish (61S) was an S-class submarine launched in 1931 and sunk by a naval mine in the English Channel in 1940.
