= HMS Sabre =

Three vessels of the Royal Navy have been called HMS Sabre after the weapon:

- HMS Sabre (1918) was an S-class destroyer launched on 23 September 1918 and sold for breaking up in November 1945.
- HMS Sabre (P275) was a 102-ton patrol boat launched on 21 April 1970 and was one of three boats making up the Fast Training Boat Squadron at Portland Harbour. The boat was sold in 1983.
- HMS Sabre (P285) is a 16-metre Scimitar-class fast patrol boat. It was commissioned into the Gibraltar squadron on 31 January 2003 and is used for police, customs and rescue purposes. It had previously been used in Northern Ireland since 1993 as MV Grey Wolf and was based in Lough Neagh where it was manned by Royal Marines.
