= HMS Snapper =

Eight ships of the Royal Navy have borne the name HMS Snapper:

- HMS Snapper (1782) was a cutter purchased in 1782. She was probably on revenue service in 1790 and was sold in 1817.
- HMS Snapper (1804) was a 4-gun cutter launched in 1804 and captured in 1811 by the French lugger Rapace.
- HMS Snapper (1813) was a 12-gun gun-brig launched in 1813. She was used by the Coastguard from 1824 and was sold in 1865.
- HMS Snapper (1854) was a wood screw gunboat launched in 1854, used as a coal hulk from 1865 and sold in 1906.
- HMS Snapper (1895) was an A-class destroyer of the Salmon subgroup. She was launched in 1895 and sold in 1911.
- HMS Snapper was an iron screw gunboat launched in 1871 as HMS Mastiff. She was renamed Snapper in 1914 and was sold in 1931.
- HMS Snapper II was a trials gunboat launched in 1882 as Handy, then purchased in 1884. She was renamed HMS Excellent in 1891, HMS Calcutta in 1916 and HMS Snapper II in 1917. She was sold in 1922 becoming the civilian crane vessel Demon. She was laid up while being considered for preservation, but has now been dismantled.
- HMS Snapper (39S) was an S-class submarine launched in 1934 and sunk in 1941.
