= HMS Seamew =

Three ships of the Royal Navy have borne the name HMS Seamew, another name for the common gull:

- HMS Seamew (1857) was a coastguard vessel, transferred from the Board of Customs in 1857 and sold in 1906.
- HMT Seamew (1909) the trawler Nunthorpe Hall built in 1909 purchased by the Admiralty that April and converted into a First World War minesweeper, based at Sheerness in 1914, sold back to fishing use in 1920.
- HMS Seamew (1928) was a river gunboat launched in 1928 and sold in 1947.
