= HMS Sussex =

Several ships of the Royal Navy have been named HMS Sussex:

- Sussex, a fourth-rate Ruby-class frigate launched with either 38 or 40 guns in 1652, later rearmed to 46 guns, and blew up in 1653
- HMS Sussex (1693), a third-rate ship of the line that sank in the Mediterranean Sea in 1694
- HMS Sussex (96), a County-class heavy cruiser, launched in 1928 and scrapped in 1950
- HMS Sussex (RNR) was the name of the Royal Naval Reserve unit in Brighton that closed in 1994
