= HMS Scipio =

Four ships of the British Royal Navy have borne the name HMS Scipio after the Roman general Scipio Africanus:

- HMS Scipio (1739) was an 8-gun fireship purchased in 1739 and sold in 1746.
- HMS Scipio (1782) was a 64-gun third rate launched in 1782 and broken up in 1798.
- HMS Scipio was the intended name for a 74-gun third rate, but she was renamed HMS Bulwark in 1806 before being launched in 1807.
- HMS Scipio was the Dutch 20-gun corvette that Edward Pellew in Psyche captured in 1807. She was not commissioned into the Royal Navy but served in the East Indies as HMS Scipio and then HMS Samarang. She was sold in 1814.
