= HMS Snowdrop =

Two ships of the Royal Navy have borne the name HMS Snowdrop after the flower, the Snowdrop:

- HMS Snowdrop (1915) was an Azalea-class sloop launched in 1915 and sold in 1923.
- HMS Snowdrop (K67) was a Flower-class corvette launched in 1940, sold in 1947 and broken up in 1949.
