= HMS Rattlesnake =

Ten ships of the Royal Navy have been named HMS Rattlesnake, including:

- HMS Rattlesnake (1777), a 14-gun cutter launched 1777, later re-classified as a sloop, and lost in 1781.
- HMS Rattlesnake (1783), ex-Rattlesnake U.S. privateer, ex-Cormorant of 1781. A 12-gun brig. The Algerine Navy and the Dey of Algiers detained her for five days in November 1784. Sold 1786.
- HMS Rattlesnake (1791), a 16-gun sloop in service from 1791 until sold in 1814.
- HMS Rattlesnake (1814), was a brig of 14 guns that the United States Navy purchased in 1813. The Royal Navy captured her in 1814 and the last extant records report that the Navy had purchased her. Her subsequent fate is currently unknown.
- HMS Rattlesnake (1822), a 28-gun frigate launched in 1822.
- HMS Rattlesnake (1861), a 21-gun Jason-class corvette launched in 1861 and broken up in 1882.
- HMS Rattlesnake (1886), a torpedo gunboat in service from 1886 to 1910.
- HMS Rattlesnake (1910), a Beagle-class destroyer launched in 1910 and sold in 1921.
- HMS Rattlesnake (1943), an Algerine-class minesweeper. Pennant J.297, M.297. Launched 23/2/1943. Scrapped at Brunton, Grangemouth, October 1959.
