= HMS Rocksand =

Two ships of the Royal Navy have borne the name HMS Rocksand:

- HMS Rocksand (1918) was a 24-class minesweeping sloop launched in 1918 and sold in 1922.
- HMS Rocksand (F184) was an infantry landing ship transferred under lend-lease in 1943 as the merchant Empire Anvil. She was commissioned HMS Rocksand in 1944, returned to the Ministry of War Transport in 1946 as Empire Anvil and returned to the United States Navy later in 1946.
