= HMS Silvio =

Two ships of the Royal Navy have borne the name HMS Silvio:

- HMS Silvio (1918) was a 24-class sloop launched in 1918. She was transferred to the Royal Australian Navy as the survey ship HMAS Moresby in 1925, became a convoy escort in 1940 and was sold in 1947.
- HMS Silvio (F160) was a landing ship, tank originally launched in 1943 as Empire Halberd. She was renamed HMS Silvio in 1944, returned to civilian service in 1946 as Empire Halberd and was returned to the United States Navy in 1948.
