= HMS Sweetbriar =

Two ships of the Royal Navy have been named HMS Sweetbriar :

- HMS Sweetbriar (1917) an Anchusa-class sloop launched in 1917 and sold in 1927
- HMS Sweetbriar (K209), a Flower-class corvette launched in 1941 and sold in 1946
