= HMS Reliance =

Three ships of the Royal Navy have borne the name HMS Reliance, whilst a fourth was planned:

- HMS Reliance (1793) was a discovery vessel purchased in 1793. She became famous as one of the ships with the early explorations of the Australian coast and other the southern Pacific islands. She was used for harbour service from 1800 and was sold in 1815.
- HMS Reliance (1812) was a 12-gun tender in service between 1812 and 1815.
- HMS Reliance (1912) was a repair ship, previously the civilian ship Knight Companion. She was purchased in 1912 and was sold in 1919.
- HMS Reliance was to have been a repair ship. She was launched in 1944 as the Liberty ship SS Dutiful and it was intended that she would be transferred to the Royal Navy under the terms of Lend-Lease. She was instead retained by the United States Navy and commissioned into their service as USS Laertes.
