= HMS Thisbe =

Four ships of the Royal Navy have borne the name HMS Thisbe, after Thisbe, a character in Greek mythology:

- HMS Thisbe (1783) was a 28-gun Enterprise-class sixth-rate frigate launched in 1783 and sold in 1815.
- HMS Thisbe (1824) was a 46-gun fifth rate launched in 1824, lent as a church ship in 1863, and sold in 1892.
- HMS Thisbe (1917) was an R-class destroyer launched in 1917, and handed over for breaking up in part-payment for RMS Majestic in 1936.
- HMS Thisbe (J302) was an Algerine-class minesweeper launched in 1943 and scrapped in 1957.
