= HMS Snapdragon =

Three Royal Navy ships have been names HMS Snapdragon, after the flower:

- HMS Snapdragon (1915) was an Arabis-class sloop launched in 1915, during World War I, and sold in 1934. She is most famous for capturing Karl Dönitz during an engagement with SM UB-68.
- HMS Snapdragon (K10) was a Flower-class corvette launched in 1940, during World War II, and sunk in 1942 in the Mediterranean.
- HMS Snapdragon (K73) was another Flower-class corvette, originally named HMS Arabis and launched in 1940. She was transferred to the United States Navy and commissioned as USS Saucy before being returned to the Royal Navy in 1945 and recommissioned as HMS Snapdragon.
