= HMS Trinidad =

Three ships of the Royal Navy have borne the name HMS Trinidad, after the Caribbean island and former British possession Trinidad:

- HMS Trinidad (1805) was a 10 gun schooner, listed in service between 1805 and 1809.
- HMS Trinidad (1918) was an S-class destroyer launched in 1918 and sold in 1932.
- HMS Trinidad (46) was a Crown Colony-class cruiser launched in 1941. She was struck by her own torpedo whilst on convoy escort duties in 1942, and sunk later that year in a German air attack.
