= HMS Trusty =

Five ships of the Royal Navy have borne the name HMS Trusty:

- HMS Trusty (1782) was a 50-gun fourth-rate launched in 1782, used as a troopship from 1799 and a prison ship from 1809, and broken up in 1815. Because Trusty served in the navy's Egyptian campaign (8 March to 2 September 1801), her officers and crew qualified for the clasp "Egypt" to the Naval General Service Medal, which the Admiralty issued in 1847 to all surviving claimants.
- HMS Trusty (1855) was an Aetna-class ironclad floating battery launched in 1855 and broken up in 1864
- HMS Trusty (1866) was a tugboat launched in 1866, renamed in 1917 as HMS Trustful and broken up in 1920
- HMS Trusty (1918) was an S-class destroyer launched in 1918 and broken up in 1936
- HMS Trusty (N45) was a T-class submarine launched in 1941 and broken up in 1947
