= HMS Trojan =

Royal Navy S class destroyer

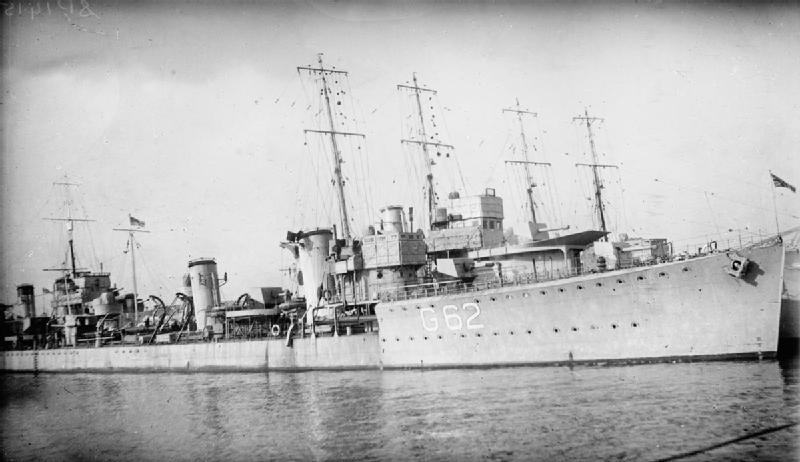
- Sister ship Tara in 1918

History

United Kingdom
- Name: HMS Trojan
- Namesake: Trojan
- Ordered: June 1917
- Builder: J. Samuel White, East Cowes
- Yard number: 1512
- Laid down: 3 January 1918
- Launched: 12 July 1918
- Completed: 6 December 1918
- Out of service: 24 September 1936
- Fate: Sold to be broken up

General characteristics
- Class & type: S-class destroyer
- Displacement: 1,075 long tons (1,092 t) normal; 1,220 long tons (1,240 t) deep load
- Length: 265 ft (80.8 m) p.p.
- Beam: 26 ft 8 in (8.13 m)
- Draught: 9 ft 10 in (3.00 m) mean
- Propulsion: 3 White-Forster boilers; 2 geared Brown-Curtis steam turbines, 27,000 shp
- Speed: 36 knots (41.4 mph; 66.7 km/h)
- Range: 2,750 nmi (5,090 km) at 15 kn (28 km/h)
- Complement: 90
- Armament: 3 × QF 4-inch (101.6 mm) Mark IV guns, mounting P Mk. IX; 1 × single 2-pounder (40-mm) "pom-pom" Mk. II anti-aircraft gun; 4 × 21 in (533 mm) torpedo tubes (2×2); 2 × 18 in (457 mm) torpedo tubes (2×1)

HMS Trojan was an S-class destroyer, which served with the Royal Navy. The vessel was the only one named in honour of the citizens of Troy that has been operated by the navy. Launched on 12 July 1918, Trojan was too late to see service in the First World War. Initially allocated to the Grand Fleet and then, when this was dissolved, the Atlantic Fleet, the destroyer was transferred to the Reserve Fleet, like many of the class, within two years of being first commissioned. The vessel remained in reserve until 24 September 1936, although in a deteriorating condition. On that day, Trojan was sold to be broken up as part of a deal for the liner Majestic.

== Design and development ==
Trojan was one of thirty-three Admiralty S class destroyers ordered by the British Admiralty in June 1917 as part of the Twelfth War Construction Programme. The design was a development of the R class introduced as a cheaper and faster alternative to the V and W class. Differences with the R class were minor, such as having the searchlight moved aft and mounting an additional pair of torpedo tubes.

Trojan had a overall length of 276 ft (84 m) and a length of 265 ft (81 m) between perpendiculars. Beam was 26 ft 8 in (8.13 m) and draught 9 ft 10 in (3.00 m). Displacement was 1,075 long tons (1,092 t) normal and 1,220 long tons (1,240 t) deep load. Three White-Forster boilers fed steam to two sets of Brown-Curtis geared steam turbines rated at 27,000 shaft horsepower (20,000 kW) and driving two shafts, giving a design speed of 36 knots (67 km/h; 41 mph) at normal loading and 32.5 knots (60.2 km/h; 37.4 mph) at deep load. Two funnels were fitted. The ship carried 301 long tons (306 t) of fuel oil, which gave a design range of 2,750 nautical miles (5,090 km; 3,160 mi) at 15 knots (28 km/h; 17 mph).

Armament consisted of three QF 4-inch (102 mm) Mk IV guns on the ship's centreline. One was mounted raised on the forecastle, one between the funnels and one aft. The ship also mounted a single 40-millimetre (1.6 in) 2-pounder pom-pom anti-aircraft gun for air defence. Four 21-inch (533 mm) torpedo tubes were fitted in two twin rotating mounts aft. The ship was also equipped with two 18-inch (457 mm) torpedo tubes either side of the superstructure which were fired by the commanding officer using toggle ropes. Fire control included a training-only director, single Dumaresq and a Vickers range clock. The ship had a complement of 90 officers and ratings.

== Construction and career ==
Trojan was laid down by J. Samuel White at East Cowes on the Isle of Wight with the yard number 1512 on 3 January 1918, and launched on 12 July the same year. The ship was completed on 6 December. The vessel is the only one to have carried the name, which recalled the inhabitants of Troy, to have served in the Royal Navy. The destroyer was to join the Fourteenth Destroyer Flotilla of the Grand Fleet but the signing of the Armistice which ended the First World War meant the vessel saw no active service.

With the dissolution of the Grand Fleet, Trojan was allocated to the Third Destroyer Flotilla of the Atlantic Fleet. The ship did not remain long in service, however, and was commissioned into the Reserve Fleet at Portsmouth on 16 August 1920. Trojan remained in reserve until 14 September 1936 when the ship was given to Thos. W. Ward of Sheffield in exchange for the liner Majestic. Having remained on reserve for more than a decade, Trojan was found to be in poor condition. The destroyer was subsequently broken up at Inverkeithing.

== Pennant numbers ==
Penant numbers
Pennant number	Date
G66	November 1918
D76	January 1919
H44	September 1936
