= HMS Truant (1918) =

Royal Navy S class destroyer

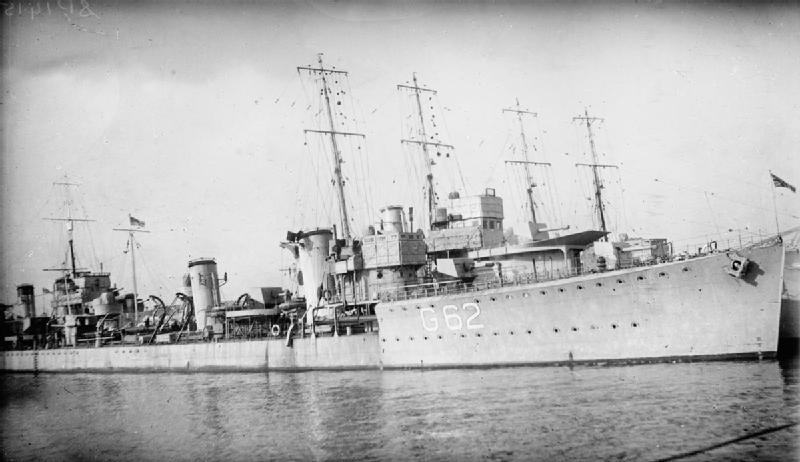
- Sister ship Tara in 1918

History

United Kingdom
- Name: HMS Truant
- Namesake: Truant
- Ordered: June 1917
- Builder: J. Samuel White], East Cowes
- Yard number: 1513
- Laid down: 14 February 1918
- Launched: 18 September 1918
- Completed: 17 March 1919
- Out of service: 28 November 1931
- Fate: Sold to be broken up

General characteristics
- Class & type: S-class destroyer
- Displacement: 1,075 long tons (1,092 t) normal; 1,220 long tons (1,240 t) deep load
- Length: 265 ft (80.8 m) p.p.
- Beam: 26 ft 8 in (8.13 m)
- Draught: 9 ft 10 in (3.00 m) mean
- Propulsion: 3 White-Forster boilers; 2 geared Brown-Curtis steam turbines, 27,000 shp
- Speed: 37 knots (42.6 mph; 68.5 km/h)
- Range: 2,750 nmi (5,090 km) at 15 kn (28 km/h)
- Complement: 90
- Armament: 3 × QF 4-inch (101.6 mm) Mark IV guns, mounting P Mk. IX; 1 × single 2-pounder (40-mm) "pom-pom" Mk. II anti-aircraft gun; 4 × 21 in (533 mm) torpedo tubes (2×2); 2 × 18 in (457 mm) torpedo tubes (2×1)

HMS Truant was an S-class destroyer, which served with the Royal Navy. The vessel was the first of the name to enter service in the navy. Launched on 18 September 1918, Truant was too late to see service in the First World War, and, instead of joining the Grand Fleet, the vessel was allocated to Portsmouth to be a tender to HMS Victory. The vessel's subsequent time in service was relatively uneventful, despite gaining a reputation as the fastest destroyer in the fleet, capable of up to 37 knots (69 km/h; 43 mph). However, in 1921, the destroyer became the control ship for the radio-controlled target ship Agamemnon and, in 1923, a similar role with smaller Coastal Motor Boats. This service did not last long. The signing of the London Naval Treaty sounded the death knell for the ship as it limited the destroyer tonnage that the Royal Navy could operate. As newer and more powerful destroyers entered service, Truant was retired on 28 November 1931 and broken up.

== Design and development ==
Truant was one of thirty-three Admiralty S class destroyers ordered by the British Admiralty in June 1917 as part of the Twelfth War Construction Programme. The design was a development of the R class introduced as a cheaper and faster alternative to the V and W class. Differences with the R class were minor, such as having the searchlight moved aft.

Truant had a overall length of 276 ft (84 m) and a length of 265 ft (81 m) between perpendiculars. Beam was 26 ft 8 in (8.13 m) and draught 9 ft 10 in (3.00 m). Displacement was 1,075 long tons (1,092 t) normal and 1,220 long tons (1,240 t) deep load. Three White-Forster boilers were installed that fed steam to two sets of Brown-Curtis geared steam turbines rated at 27,000 shaft horsepower (20,000 kW), driving two shafts and venting through two funnels. Design speed was 36 knots (67 km/h; 41 mph) at normal loading and 32.5 knots (60.2 km/h; 37.4 mph) at deep load. The destroyer exceeded these speeds in service, gaining a reputation as the fastest destroyer in the Royal Navy, being capable of up to 37 knots (69 km/h; 43 mph). A total of 301 long tons (306 t) of fuel oil was carried, which gave a design range of 2,750 nautical miles (5,090 km; 3,160 mi) at 15 knots (28 km/h; 17 mph).

Armament consisted of three QF 4-inch (102 mm) Mk IV guns on the ship's centreline. One was mounted raised on the forecastle, one between the funnels and one aft. The ship also mounted a single 40-millimetre (1.6 in) 2-pounder pom-pom anti-aircraft gun for air defence. Four 21-inch (533 mm) tubes were fitted in two twin rotating mounts aft. The ship was also equipped with two 18-inch (457 mm) torpedo tubes either side of the superstructure which were fired by the commanding officer using toggle ropes. The ship had a complement of 90 officers and ratings.

== Construction and career ==
Truant was laid down by J. Samuel White at East Cowes on the Isle of Wight with the yard number 1513 on 14 February 1918, and launched on 18 September the same year. The ship was completed on 17 March the following year. The vessel was the first to carry the name. The destroyer was to join the Fourteenth Destroyer Flotilla of the Grand Fleet but the signing of the Armistice which ended the First World War meant the vessel saw no active service, instead being allocated as a tender to HMS Victory at Portsmouth. The ship was given a reduced complement on 13 May 1919.

In August 1921, Truant was converted to be the control ship for the radio-controlled target ship Agamemnon. The destroyer would typically follow the larger ship at a distance of about 1 mile (0.87 nmi; 1.6 km), sufficiently far not to be struck by a wayward shell but close enough to see the damage done. In 1923, Truant served in the additional role of Signals School trials ship as well as working with smaller radio-controlled Coastal Motor Boats. However, this role did not last long, the destroyer being replaced as controller by sister ship Shikari within a few years. On 22 April 1930, the United Kingdom signed the London Naval Treaty, which limited the total destroyer tonnage that the navy could operate. As newer, larger and more powerful vessels were introduced, older destroyers like the S class were gradually retired. Truant remained in service until 28 November 1931 when the vessel was sold to Rees of Llanelly, and broken up.

== Pennant numbers ==
Penant numbers
Pennant number	Date
G23	March 1918
HA0	January 1919
