= HMS Spindrift (1918) =

Royal Navy S class destroyer

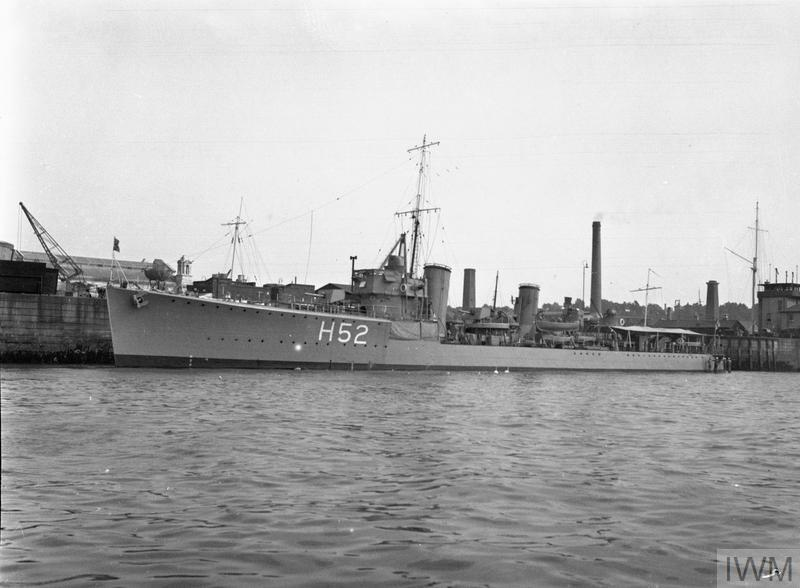
- Sister ship Scotsman

History

United Kingdom
- Name: Spindrift
- Ordered: 23 June 1917
- Builder: Fairfield, Govan
- Laid down: April 1918
- Launched: 30 December 1918
- Completed: 2 April 1919
- Out of service: 28 July 1936

General characteristics
- Class & type: S-class destroyer
- Displacement: 1,075 long tons (1,092 t) normal; 1,221 long tons (1,241 t) deep load
- Length: 265 ft (80.8 m) p.p.
- Beam: 26 ft 8 in (8.13 m)
- Draught: 9 ft 10 in (3.00 m) mean
- Propulsion: 3 Yarrow boilers; 2 geared Parsons steam turbines, 27,000 shp
- Speed: 36 knots (41.4 mph; 66.7 km/h)
- Range: 2,750 nmi (5,090 km) at 15 kn (28 km/h)
- Complement: 90
- Armament: 3 × single QF 4 in (102 mm) guns; 1 × single 2-pdr 40 mm (2 in) Mk. II AA gun; 2 × twin 21 in (533 mm) torpedo tubes; 4 × depth charge chutes

HMS Spindrift was an Admiralty S-class destroyer that served with the Royal Navy during the twentieth century. The S class was a development of the R class created during the First World War as a cheaper alternative to the V and W class. Launched in 1918 shortly after Armistice that ended the war. With this came a need to reduce the number of ships on active service and in consequence, in 1919, the destroyer was reduced to reserve and stationed as a tender at Devonport. Following the signing of the London Naval Treaty in 1930, the destroyer was retired and, in 1934, sold to be broken up.

== Design and development ==
Spindrift was one of 36 Admiralty S-class destroyers ordered by the British Admiralty on 23 June 1917 as part of the Twelfth War Construction Programme during the First World War. The design was a development of the R class introduced at the same time as, and as a cheaper and faster alternative to, the V and W class. Differences with the R class were minor, such as having the searchlight moved aft and being designed to mount an additional pair of torpedo tubes.

The destroyer had a overall length of 276 ft (84 m) and a length of 265 ft (81 m) between perpendiculars. Beam was 26 ft 8 in (8.13 m) and mean draught 9 ft 10 in (3.00 m). Displacement was 1,075 long tons (1,092 t) normal and 1,221 long tons (1,241 t) deep load. Three Yarrow boilers fed steam to two sets of Parsons geared steam turbines rated at 27,000 shaft horsepower (20,000 kW) and driving two shafts, giving a design speed of 36 knots (67 km/h; 41 mph) at normal loading and 32.5 knots (60.2 km/h; 37.4 mph) at deep load. Two funnels were fitted. A full load of 301 long tons (306 t) of fuel oil was carried, which gave a design range of 2,750 nautical miles (5,090 km; 3,160 mi) at 15 knots (28 km/h; 17 mph).

Armament consisted of three QF 4 in (102 mm) Mk IV guns on the ship's centreline. One was mounted raised on the forecastle, one on a platform between the funnels, and one aft. The destroyer mounted a single 2-pounder 40 mm (1.6 in) "pom-pom" anti-aircraft gun for air defence. Four 21 in (533 mm) torpedo tubes were carried in two twin rotating mounts aft. Four depth charge chutes were also fitted aft. Initially, typically ten depth charges were carried. The ship was designed to mount two additional 18 in (457 mm) torpedo tubes either side of the superstructure but this required the forecastle plating to be cut away, causing excess water to come aboard at sea, so they were not carried. The weight saved enabled the heavier Mark V 21-inch torpedo to be carried. Fire control included a training-only director, single Dumaresq and a Vickers range clock. The ship had a complement of 90 officers and ratings.

== Construction and career ==
Laid down in April 1918 by Fairfield at their dockyard in Govan, Spindrift, the first Royal Navy ship to be given the name, was launched on 30 December after the Armistice of 11 November 1918 that ended the war. The vessel was completed on 2 April the following year. However, with the end of the conflict, the Royal Navy returned to a peacetime level of strength and both the number of ships and personnel needed to be reduced to save money. Spindrift was deemed superfluous to requirements as part of the front-line fleets and reduced to reserve on 14 August, serving as a tender at Devonport under the dreadnought Colossus. On 1 April 1925, the vessel was replaced as the emergency destroyer at Plymouth by sister ships Scotsman and Seafire.

On 22 April 1930, the United Kingdom had signed the London Naval Treaty, which limited the total destroyer tonnage that the navy could operate.The S class was deemed out of date and ripe to be replaced with larger more modern ships. In addition, like many of the class stored in reserve, the ship had deteriorated and was considered by the Admiralty to be in too poor condition to return to operations. Spindrift was retired and, on 28 July 1934, was sold to Thos. W. Ward of Inverkeithing to be broken up.

== Pennant numbers ==
Penant numbers
| Pennant number | Date |
|---|---|
| G21 | September 1918 |
| HA7 | November 1919 |
| H57 | January 1922 |
