= HMAS Swordsman =

Australian warship

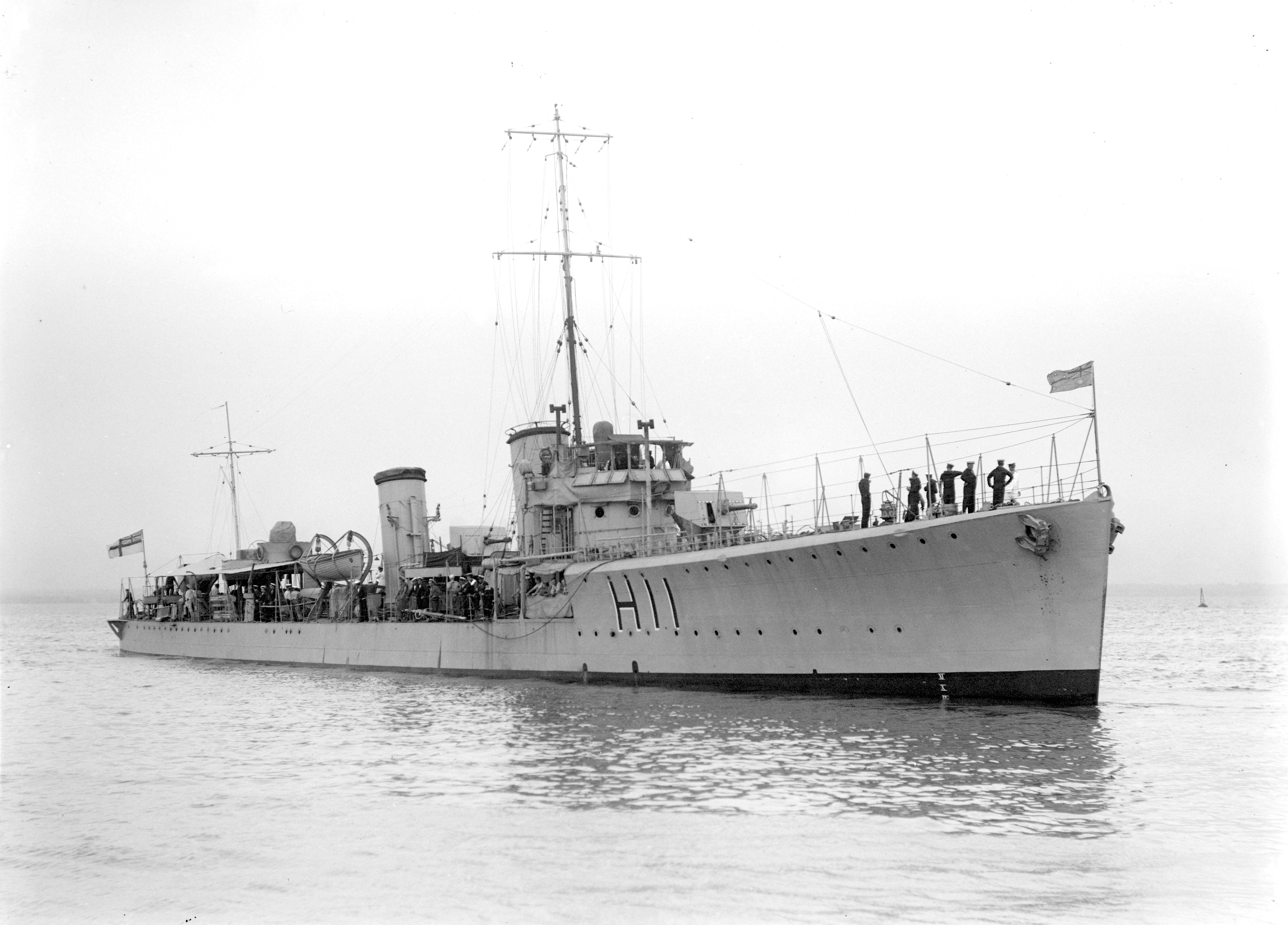
- HMAS Swordsman

History

Australia
- Builder: Scott's Shipbuilding and Engineering Company
- Laid down: 1917
- Launched: 28 December 1918
- Completed: March 1919
- Commissioned: 27 January 1920
- Decommissioned: 21 December 1929
- Fate: Scuttled off Sydney, 8 February 1939
- Badge

General characteristics
- Class & type: Admiralty S-class destroyer
- Displacement: 1,075 tons
- Length: 276 ft (84 m) length overall; 265 ft (81 m) between perpendiculars
- Beam: 26 ft 10 in (8.18 m)
- Propulsion: 3 × Yarrow boilers, Brown-Curtis turbines, 27,000 shp (20,000 kW), 2 shafts
- Speed: 33 knots (61 km/h; 38 mph)
- Range: 2,990 nautical miles (5,540 km; 3,440 mi) at 11.5 knots (21.3 km/h; 13.2 mph)
- Complement: 6 officers, 93 sailors
- Armament: 3 × QF 4-inch (102 mm) Mk IV guns; 1 × QF 2-pounder (40 mm) pom-pom AA guns; 2 × 9.5-inch howitzers; 5 × .303-inch machine guns; 2 × twin 21-inch (533 mm) torpedo tube sets; 2 depth charge throwers; 4 depth charge chutes

HMAS Swordsman (H11) was an Admiralty S-class destroyer of the Royal Australian Navy (RAN). Built for the Royal Navy during World War I, the ship was not completed until 1919, and was transferred to the RAN at the start of 1920. The destroyer's career was uneventful, with most of it spent moored in Sydney. Swordsman was decommissioned in 1929, and scuttled off Sydney in 1939.

== Design and construction ==
Swordsman was built to the Admiralty design of the S-class destroyer, which was designed and built as part of the British emergency war programme. The destroyer had a displacement of 1,075 tons, a length of 276 feet (84 m) overall and 265 feet (81 m) between perpendiculars, and a beam of 26 feet 10 inches (8.18 m). The propulsion machinery consisted of three Yarrow boilers feeding Brown-Curtis turbines, which supplied 27,000 shaft horsepower (20,000 kW) to the ship's two propeller shafts. Swordsman had a maximum speed of 33 knots (61 km/h; 38 mph), and a range of 2,990 nautical miles (5,540 km; 3,440 mi) at 11.5 knots (21.3 km/h; 13.2 mph). The ship's company was made up of 6 officers and 93 sailors.

The destroyer's primary armament consisted of three QF 4-inch Mark IV guns. These were supplemented by a 2-pounder pom-pom, two 9.5-inch howitzer bomb throwers, five .303 inch machine guns (a mix of Lewis and Maxim guns), two twin 21-inch torpedo tube sets, two depth charge throwers, and two depth charge chutes.

Swordsman was laid down by Scott's Shipbuilding and Engineering Company at their Greenock shipyard in 1917. The destroyer was launched on 28 December 1918, and completed during March 1919. In June 1919, the destroyer was marked for transfer to the RAN, along with four sister ships. Swordsman was commissioned into the RAN on 27 January 1920.

== Operational history ==
After arriving in Australian waters, the majority of Swordsman's career was spent moored in Sydney.

== Decommissioning and fate ==
Swordsman was paid off into reserve on 21 December 1929. She was sold to Penguins Limited of Balmain, New South Wales for ship breaking on 4 June 1937. Her hull (with engines removed) was scuttled off Sydney on 8 February 1939 in location 34°11′S 151°31′E.
