= HMS Trinidad (1918) =

Royal Navy S class destroyer

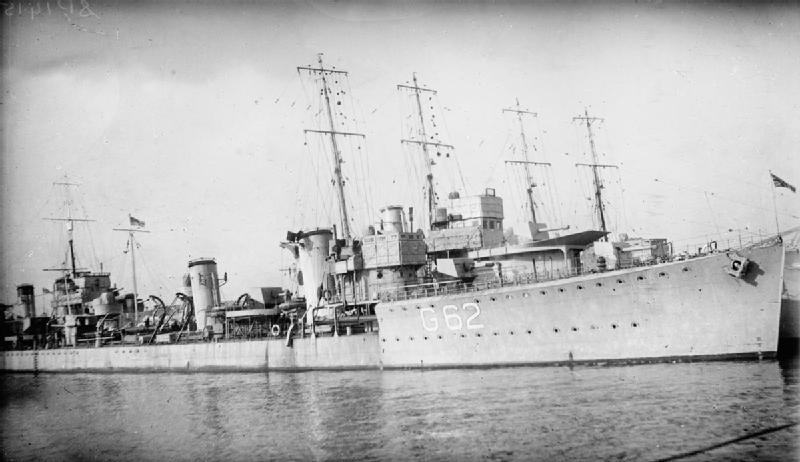
- Sister ship Tara in 1918

History

United Kingdom
- Name: HMS Trinidad
- Namesake: Trinidad
- Ordered: 7 April 1917
- Builder: J. Samuel White, East Cowes
- Yard number: 1507
- Laid down: 15 September 1917
- Launched: 8 May 1918
- Completed: 16 July 1918
- Out of service: 16 February 1932
- Fate: Sold to be broken up

General characteristics
- Class & type: S-class destroyer
- Displacement: 1,075 long tons (1,092 t) normal; 1,221 long tons (1,241 t) deep load
- Length: 265 ft (80.8 m) p.p.
- Beam: 26 ft 8 in (8.13 m)
- Draught: 9 ft 10 in (3.00 m) mean
- Propulsion: 3 White-Forster boilers; 2 geared Brown-Curtis steam turbines, 27,000 shp
- Speed: 36 knots (41.4 mph; 66.7 km/h)
- Range: 2,750 nmi (5,090 km) at 15 kn (28 km/h)
- Complement: 90
- Armament: 3 × QF 4-inch (101.6 mm) Mark IV guns, mounting P Mk. IX; 1 × single 2-pounder (40-mm) "pom-pom" Mk. II anti-aircraft gun; 4 × 21 in (533 mm) torpedo tubes (2×2)

HMS Trinidad was an S-class destroyer that served with the Royal Navy. The ship was named after the island in the West Indies. Launched on 8 May 1918, the vessel entered service with the Grand Fleet but saw no action during the First World War. After the Armistice, Trinidad joined the Mediterranean Fleet. War had broken out between Greece and Turkey and there was intelligence that the Soviet Union was selling warships to one of the belligerents. Trinidad was part of a small flotilla that was sent to investigate and, ultimately, halt this trade. However, it turned out to be a hoax. The destroyer subsequently returned to Constantinople. In 1930, the signing of the London Naval Treaty required the Royal Navy to retire older destroyers before acquiring new ones. Trinidad was one of those chosen for retirement and, on 16 February 1932, the destroyer was sold to be broken up.

== Design and development ==
Trinidad was one of thirty-three Admiralty S class destroyers ordered by the British Admiralty on 7 April 1917 as part of the Eleventh War Construction Programme. The design was a development of the R class introduced as a cheaper and faster alternative to the V and W class.

Trinidad had an overall length of 276 ft (84 m) and a length of 265 ft (81 m) between perpendiculars. Beam was 26 ft 8 in (8.13 m) and draught 9 ft 10 in (3.00 m). Displacement was 1,075 long tons (1,092 t) normal and 1,221 long tons (1,241 t) deep load. Three White-Forster boilers fed steam to two sets of Brown-Curtis geared steam turbines rated at 27,000 shaft horsepower (20,000 kW) and driving two shafts, giving a design speed of 36 knots (67 km/h; 41 mph) at normal loading and 32.5 knots (60.2 km/h; 37.4 mph) at deep load. Two funnels were fitted. The ship carried 301 long tons (306 t) of fuel oil, which gave a design range of 2,750 nautical miles (5,090 km; 3,160 mi) at 15 knots (28 km/h; 17 mph).

Armament consisted of three QF 4-inch (102 mm) Mk IV guns on the ship's centreline. One was mounted raised on the forecastle, one between the funnels on a platform and one aft. The ship also mounted a single 40-millimetre (1.6 in) 2-pounder pom-pom anti-aircraft gun for air defence. Four 21-inch (533 mm) torpedo tubes were fitted in two twin rotating mounts aft. The ship was designed to mount two 18-inch (457 mm) torpedo tubes either side of the superstructure but this addition required the forecastle plating to be cut away, making the vessel very wet, so they were removed. The weight saved enabled the heavier Mark V 21-inch torpedo to be carried. Fire control included a training-only director, single Dumaresq and a Vickers range clock. The ship had a complement of 90 officers and ratings.

== Construction and career ==
Trinidad was laid down by J. Samuel White at East Cowes on the Isle of Wight with the yard number 1507 on 15 September 1917, and launched on 8 May the following year. The ship was completed on 9 September. The vessel was the second to carry the name, which honoured the island of Trinidad in the West Indies. On commissioning,Trinidad joined the Twelfth Destroyer Flotilla of the Grand Fleet.

With the First World War closing, the destroyer saw no action before the Armistice. However, although the war had ended, fighting ensued between Greece and Turkey. The United Kingdom decided to send units of the Royal Navy to the front line. Trinidad was one of the ships chosen. The destroyer was commissioned in Malta on 9 December 1920 to join the Sixth Destroyer Flotilla of the Mediterranean Fleet and sailed to Constantinople. In August, the destroyer accompanied the destroyer leader Montrose on a mission along the Black Sea coast of Anatolia to search for warships that it was alleged that the Soviet Union was passing on to the Kemalist forces which were creating Turkey out of the old Ottoman Empire. The ships were unsuccessful as the transaction was a hoax. The two vessels then returned and Trinidad relocated to Smyrna. On 14 September the following year, the destroyer accompanied the dreadnought battleship Iron Duke to Chanak and then back to Constantinople.

On 22 April 1930, the United Kingdom signed the London Naval Treaty, which limited the total destroyer tonnage that the navy could operate. The S class was deemed out of date and ripe to be replaced with more modern ships, including the C and D-class destroyers. Trinidad was therefore retired and, on 16 February 1932, sold to Thos. W. Ward then broken up at Inverkeithing.

== Pennant number ==
Penant number
Pennant number	Date
G38	September 1918
F54	January 1919
H4A	November 1919
D17	January 1922

== Bibliography ==
- Bush, Steve; Warlow, Ben (2021). Pendant Numbers of the Royal Navy: A Complete History of the Allocation of Pendant Numbers to Royal Navy Warships & Auxiliaries. Barnsley: Seaforth Publishing. ISBN 978-1-526793-78-2.
- Colledge, J. J.; Warlow, Ben (2006). Ships of the Royal Navy: a complete record of all fighting ships of the Royal Navy from the 15th century to the present. London: Chatham. ISBN 978-1-85367-566-9.
- Dittmar, F.J.; Colledge, J.J. (1972). British Warships 1914–1919. Shepperton: Ian Allan. ISBN 978-0-71100-380-4.
- Friedman, Norman (2009). British Destroyers: From Earliest Days to the First World War. Barnsley: Seaforth Publishing. ISBN 978-1-84832-049-9.
- Gardiner, Robert; Gray, Randal, eds. (1985). Conway's All the World's Fighting Ships 1906–1921. London: Conway Maritime Press. ISBN 978-0-85177-245-5.
- Halpern, Paul (2019). The Mediterranean Fleet, 1919-1929. London: Routledge. ISBN 978-1-91142-387-4.
- March, Edgar J. (1966). British Destroyers: A History of Development, 1892–1953. London: Seeley Service. OCLC 164893555.
- Parkes, Oscar; Prendergast, Maurice (1969). Jane's Fighting Ships 1919. Newton Abbott: David & Charles. OCLC 907574860.
- Williams, David L.; Sprake, Raymond F. (1993). White's of Cowes : "White's-built, well-built!". Peterborough: Silver Link. ISBN 978-1-85794-011-4.
