= HMS Sparrowhawk (1918) =

Royal Navy S class destroyer

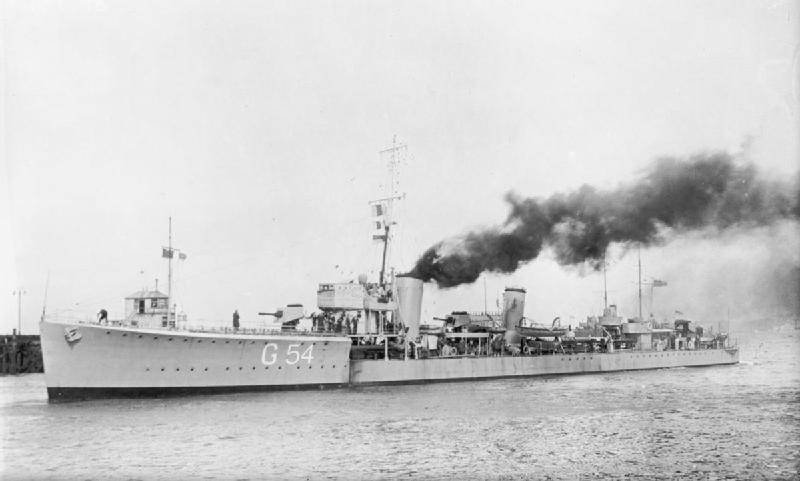
- Sister ship Tactician

History

United Kingdom
- Name: Sparrowhawk
- Namesake: Sparrowhawk
- Ordered: 7 April 1917
- Builder: Swan Hunter, Wallsend
- Laid down: September 1917
- Launched: 14 May 1918
- Completed: 4 September 1918
- Out of service: 5 February 1931
- Fate: Sold to be broken up

General characteristics
- Class & type: S-class destroyer
- Displacement: 1,075 long tons (1,092 t) normal; 1,221 long tons (1,241 t) deep load
- Length: 265 ft (80.8 m) p.p.
- Beam: 26 ft 8 in (8.13 m)
- Draught: 9 ft 10 in (3.00 m) mean
- Propulsion: 3 Yarrow boilers; 2 geared Parsons steam turbines, 27,000 shp
- Speed: 36 knots (41.4 mph; 66.7 km/h)
- Range: 2,750 nmi (5,090 km) at 15 kn (28 km/h)
- Complement: 90
- Armament: 3 × single QF 4 in (102 mm) guns; 1 × single 2-pdr 40 mm (2 in) AA gun; 2 × twin 21 in (533 mm) torpedo tubes; 4 × depth charge chutes

HMS Sparrowhawk was an Admiralty S-class destroyer that served with the Royal Navy in the Russian Civil War. The S class was a development of the R class created during the First World War as a cheaper alternative to the V and W class. Launched in 1918 shortly before the Armistice, the ship was commissioned into the Fourteenth Destroyer Flotilla of the Grand Fleet. The ship joined the Mediterranean Fleet and sailed to Smyrna during the Russian Civil War. After the dissolution of the General Assembly of the Ottoman Empire during the Turkish War of Independence, the vessel sailed to Istanbul and stayed briefly in the city. After the London Naval Treaty of 1930, and the subsequent reduction in the Royal Navy's older destroyer force, Sparrowhawk was retired and, in 1931, sold to be broken up in Plymouth.

== Design and development ==
Sparrowhawk was one of 33 Admiralty S-class destroyers ordered by the British Admiralty on 7 April 1917 as part of the Eleventh War Construction Programme. The design was a development of the R class introduced at the same time as, and as a cheaper and faster alternative to, the V and W class. Differences with the R class were minor, such as having the searchlight moved aft and being designed to mount an additional pair of torpedo tubes.

The destroyer had a overall length of 276 ft (84 m) and a length of 265 ft (81 m) between perpendiculars. Beam was 26 ft 8 in (8.13 m) and mean draught 9 ft 10 in (3.00 m). Displacement was 1,075 long tons (1,092 t) normal and 1,221 long tons (1,241 t) deep load. Three Yarrow boilers fed steam to two sets of Parsons geared steam turbines rated at 27,000 shaft horsepower (20,000 kW) and driving two shafts, giving a design speed of 36 knots (67 km/h; 41 mph) at normal loading and 32.5 knots (60.2 km/h; 37.4 mph) at deep load. Two funnels were fitted. A full load of 301 long tons (306 t) of fuel oil was carried, which gave a design range of 2,750 nautical miles (5,090 km; 3,160 mi) at 15 knots (28 km/h; 17 mph). The ship had a complement of 90 officers and ratings.

Armament consisted of three QF 4 in (102 mm) Mk IV guns on the ship's centreline. One was mounted raised on the forecastle, one on a platform between the funnels, and one aft. The ship was also armed with a single 2-pounder 40 mm (1.6 in) "pom-pom" anti-aircraft gun for air defence. Four 21 in (533 mm) torpedo tubes were carried in two twin rotating mounts aft. The ship was to mount two additional 18 in (457 mm) torpedo tubes either side of the superstructure, controlled by the commander with toggle ropes. This would have required the forecastle plating to be cut away, causing excess water to come aboard at sea, so they were not fitted. The weight saved enabled the heavier Mark V 21-inch torpedo to be carried. Four depth charge chutes were also fitted aft and typically ten depth charges were carried. Fire control included a training-only director, single Dumaresq and a Vickers range clock.

== Construction and career ==
Laid down on September 1917 during the First World War by Swan Hunter & Wigham Richardson at their dockyard in Wallsend on the River Tyne with the yard number 1083, Sparrowhawk was launched on 14 May 1918 and completed on 4 September shortly before the Armistice that ended the war. The ship was the sixth of the name to enter service with the Royal Navy. Sparrowhawk was commissioned into the Grand Fleet, joining the Fourteenth Destroyer Flotilla. However, with the end of the war, the Royal Navy returned to a peacetime level of strength and both the number of ships and personnel needed to be reduced to save money. On 27 April 1920, the ship was recommissioned at Plymouth. The vessel was transferred to the Sixth Destroyer Flotilla to serve with the Mediterranean Fleet. On 26 May, the vessel sailed from Gibraltar to Malta.

By this time, the increasingly belligerent Russian Civil War led the Royal Navy to send ships into the Black Sea to support the White Russian forces. On 8 June, Sparrowhawk sailed for Smyrna. At the same time, the war between Greece and Turkey was escalating and the Turkish War of Independence had broken out. This conflict increasingly became the focus for the Mediterranean Fleet. After the dissolution of the General Assembly of the Ottoman Empire, the British sent additional warships to support the Occupation of Istanbul. The High Commissioner, John de Robeck, advocated an attack on the remainingOttoman Navy but instead a number of ships sailed in support of negotiations between the Turkish National Movement and the allied powers. On 29 July, Sparrowhawk sailed for the city. The fleet remained there as a demonstration of force. On 8 February 1923, the destroyer arrived back in Smyrna.

On 1 April 1926, the vessel replaced Serene as emergency destroyer at HMNB Devonport. On 22 April 1930, the London Naval Treaty was signed, which limited total destroyer tonnage that the Royal Navy could operate. As the force was looking to introduce more modern destroyers, some of the older vessels needed to be retired. On 28 August, the destroyer was put up for sale. The ship was retired and, on 5 February 1931, the sold to be broken up by Ward in Grays.

== Pennant numbers ==
Penant numbers
| Pennant number | Date |
|---|---|
| G54 | November 1918 |
| D74 | November 1919 |
| H99 | January 1922 |
