= HMS Stonehenge (1919) =

Royal Navy S class destroyer

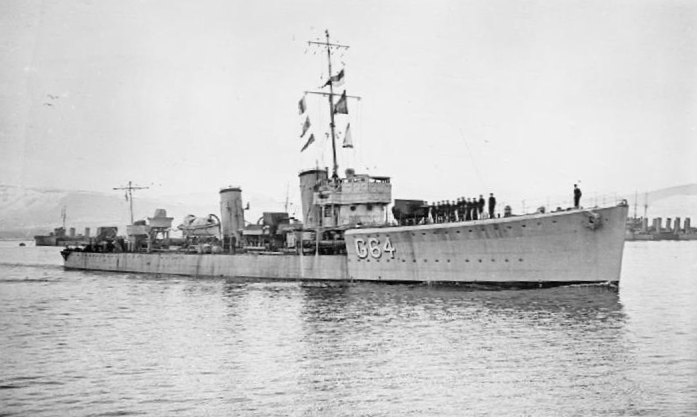
- Sister ship Strenuous

History

United Kingdom
- Name: Stonehenge
- Ordered: 7 April 1917
- Builder: Palmers, Jarrow
- Launched: 19 March 1919
- Commissioned: 14 August 1919
- Out of service: 6 November 1920
- Fate: Abandoned after running aground

General characteristics
- Class & type: S-class destroyer
- Displacement: 1,075 long tons (1,092 t) normal; 1,221 long tons (1,241 t) deep load
- Length: 265 ft (80.8 m) p.p.
- Beam: 26 ft 8 in (8.1 m)
- Draught: 9 ft 10 in (3 m) mean
- Propulsion: 3 Yarrow boilers; 2 geared Parsons steam turbines, 27,000 shp
- Speed: 36 knots (41.4 mph; 66.7 km/h)
- Range: 2,750 nmi (5,090 km) at 15 kn (28 km/h)
- Complement: 90
- Armament: 3 × single QF 4 in (102 mm) guns; 1 × single 2-pdr 40 mm (2 in) Mk. II AA gun; 2 × twin 21 in (533 mm) torpedo tubes; 4 × depth charge chutes

HMS Stonehenge was an Admiralty S-class destroyer that served with the Royal Navy during the twentieth century. The S class was a development of the R class created during the First World War as a cheaper alternative to the V and W class. Launched after Armistice that ended the war, the ship was commissioned in 1919 and joined the Fourth Destroyer Flotilla. The vessel supported the Allied intervention in the Russian Civil War and then British forces assisting the partition of the Ottoman Empire, being based at Constantinople in 1920. In that year, the destroyer ran aground off the coast of Smyrna while on a routine mission. Despite attempts by sister ship Serapis to refloat the stricken vessel, Stonehenge had to be abandoned, although no one died in the accident. The remains were sold in 1921.

== Design and development ==
Stonehenge was one of 33 Admiralty S-class destroyers ordered by the British Admiralty on 7 April 1917 during the First World War as part of the Eleventh War Construction Programme. The design was a development of the R class introduced at the same time as, and as a cheaper and faster alternative to, the V and W class. Differences with the R class were minor, such as having the searchlight moved aft and being designed to mount an additional pair of torpedo tubes.

The destroyer had a overall length of 276 ft (84.1 m) and a length of 265 ft (80.8 m) between perpendiculars. Beam was 26 ft 8 in (8.1 m) and mean draught 9 ft 10 in (3 m). Displacement was 1,075 long tons (1,092 t) normal and 1,221 long tons (1,241 t) deep load. Three Yarrow boilers fed steam to two sets of Parsons geared steam turbines rated at 27,000 shaft horsepower (20,000 kW) and driving two shafts, giving a design speed of 36 knots (67 km/h; 41 mph) at normal loading and 32.5 knots (60.2 km/h; 37.4 mph) at deep load. Two funnels were fitted. A full load of 301 long tons (306 t) of fuel oil was carried, which gave a design range of 2,750 nautical miles (5,090 km; 3,160 mi) at 15 knots (28 km/h; 17 mph). The ship had a complement of 90 officers and ratings.

Armament consisted of three QF 4 in (102 mm) Mk IV guns on the ship's centreline. One was mounted raised on the forecastle, one on a platform between the funnels, and one aft. The destroyer mounted a single 2-pounder 40 mm (1.6 in) "pom-pom" anti-aircraft gun for air defence. Four 21 in (533 mm) torpedo tubes were carried in two twin rotating mounts aft. Four depth charge chutes were also fitted aft. Initially, typically ten depth charges were carried. The ship was designed to mount two additional 18 in (457 mm) torpedo tubes either side of the superstructure but this required the forecastle plating to be cut away, causing excess water to come aboard at sea, so they were not carried. The weight saved enabled the heavier Mark V 21-inch torpedo to be carried. Fire control included a training-only director, single Dumaresq and a Vickers range clock.

== Construction and career ==
Laid down by Palmers at their dockyard in Jarrow, Stonehenge, the first Royal Navy ship to be given the name, was launched on 19 March 1919 after the Armistice of 11 November 1918 that ended the war. The vessel was commissioned on 14 August 1919, joining the Fourth Destroyer Flotilla as a tender to the depot ship Hecla. The ship was transferred to Chatham to replace the R-class destroyer Tempest and was completed to full crew on 11 October. The vessel briefly served in the British campaign in the Baltic as part of the Allied intervention in the Russian Civil War, but returned to Chatham on 1 April 1920.

On 20 August 1920, the Treaty of Sèvres was signed between the Ottoman Empire and the Allies agreeing the partition of the Ottoman Empire. However, to enforce the terms required military intervention in the region. The Royal Navy had been in military occupation of Constantinople since 16 March. Stonehenge was detached from the Fourth Destroyer Flotilla and joined the deployment, serving in the Mediterranean Sea. On 31 October, the destroyer sailed from Constantinople to Mudros on a routine mission, to collect mail and ratings. However, off the coast of Smyrna, the vessel encountered very strong rain that reduced visibility and ran aground. The crew fired rockets to attract attention and were rescued by sister ship Serapis, which also attempted to refloat the destroyer. This was unsuccessful and Stonehenge was abandoned on 6 November. The wreck was sold on 26 March 1921.

== Pennant numbers ==
Penant numbers
Pennant number	Date
G99	September 1918
D93	November 1919
F58	December 1920
