= HMS Senator =

Royal Navy S class destroyer

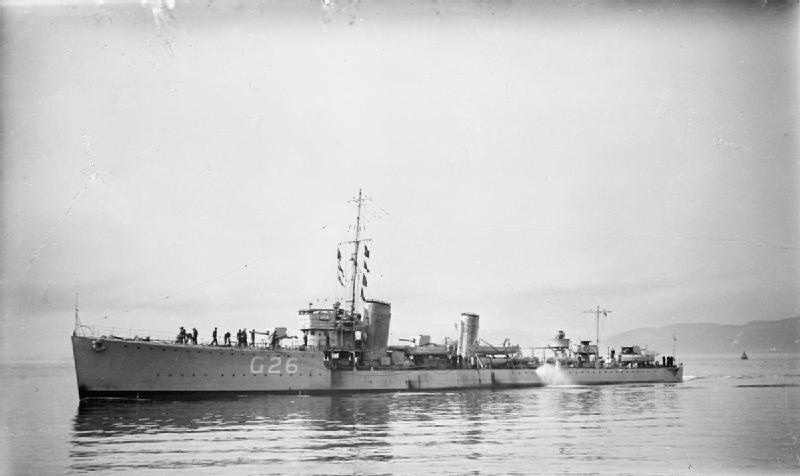
- Sister ship Sepoy in c. 1918

History

United Kingdom
- Name: HMS Senator
- Namesake: Senator
- Ordered: 7 April 1917
- Builder: Denny, Dumbarton
- Yard number: 1098
- Laid down: 10 July 1917
- Launched: 2 April 1918
- Completed: 7 June 1918
- Out of service: 7 September 1936
- Fate: Sold to be broken up

General characteristics
- Class & type: S-class destroyer
- Displacement: 1,075 long tons (1,092 t) normal; 1,221 long tons (1,241 t) deep load
- Length: 265 ft (80.8 m) p.p.
- Beam: 26 ft 8 in (8.13 m)
- Draught: 9 ft 10 in (3.00 m) mean
- Propulsion: 3 Yarrow boilers; 2 geared Brown-Curtis steam turbines, 27,000 shp
- Speed: 36 knots (41.4 mph; 66.7 km/h)
- Range: 2,750 nmi (5,090 km) at 15 kn (28 km/h)
- Complement: 90
- Armament: 3 × QF 4-inch (101.6 mm) Mark IV guns, mounting P Mk. IX; 1 × 2-pounder (40-mm) "pom-pom" Mk. II anti-aircraft gun; 4 × 21 in (533 mm) torpedo tubes (2×2)

HMS Senator was an S-class destroyer, which served with the Royal Navy during the First World War, Greco-Turkish War and Russian Civil War. The S class were a development of the previous R class, and Senator was the first of six constructed by Denny. Senator was launched on 2 April 1918 and joined the Mediterranean Fleet. After the Armistice that ended the First World War, the destroyer continued to serve in active duty, both in the Mediterranean and the Black Seas. For example, in 1919, the ship helped cover the evacuation of Russian troops from Batumi. In 1925, Senator was placed in reserve and, in 1936, was given to Thos. W. Ward of Sheffield in part-exchange for the liner RMS Majestic.

== Design and development ==
Senator was one of thirty-three Admiralty S class destroyers ordered by the British Admiralty on 7 April 1917 as part of the Eleventh War Construction Programme. The design was a development of the R class introduced as a cheaper and faster alternative to the V and W class. Differences with the R class were minor, such as having the searchlight moved aft.

Senator had a overall length of 276 ft (84 m) and a length of 265 ft (81 m) between perpendiculars. Beam was 26 ft 8 in (8.13 m) and draught 9 ft 10 in (3.00 m). Displacement was 1,075 long tons (1,092 t) normal and 1,221 long tons (1,241 t) deep load. Three Yarrow boilers fed steam to two sets of Brown-Curtis geared steam turbines rated at 27,000 shaft horsepower (20,000 kW) and driving two shafts, giving a design speed of 36 knots (67 km/h; 41 mph) at normal loading and 32.5 knots (60.2 km/h; 37.4 mph) at deep load. Two funnels were fitted. A full load of 301 long tons (306 t) of fuel oil was carried, which gave a design range of 2,750 nautical miles (5,090 km; 3,160 mi) at 15 knots (28 km/h; 17 mph).

Armament consisted of three QF 4-inch (102 mm) Mk IV guns on the ship's centreline. One was mounted raised on the forecastle, one on a platform between the funnels and one aft. The ship also mounted a single 40-millimetre (1.6 in) 2-pounder pom-pom anti-aircraft gun for air defence. Four 21-inch (533 mm) torpedo tubes were fitted in two twin rotating mounts aft. The ship was designed to mount two additional 18-inch (457 mm) torpedo tubes either side of the superstructure but this required the forecastle plating to be cut away, making the vessel very wet, so they were removed. The weight saved enabled the heavier Mark V 21-inch torpedo to be carried. The ship had a complement of 90 officers and ratings.

== Construction and career ==
Laid down on 10 July 1917 by William Denny and Brothers in Dumbarton with the yard number 1098, Senator was launched on 2 April the following year. The name was given in honour of the members of the Roman Senate. The vessel was the first with the name to serve in the Royal Navy, and the first of six of the class to be built by the yard. Senator was completed on 7 June and joined the Adriatic Squadron of the Mediterranean Fleet. A trial platform was fitted aft to test launching aircraft while travelling full speed astern. However, the trial was a failure and the platform was removed soon after.

After the Armistice that ended the First World War, Senator joined the Sixth Destroyer Flotilla. The ship subsequently voyaged through the Bosporus into the Black Sea to assist in efforts to evacuate people at risk from the conflicts in the region, both the Greco-Turkish War and the Russian Civil War. For example, Senator was sent, along with sister ship Swallow and the dreadnought battleships Ajax and Emperor of India, to assist in the evacuation of Batumi, staying until 9 July 1919 to cover the evacuation of troops to Russia. On 21 September 1923, the destroyer was transferred to the Seventh Destroyer Flotilla of the Atlantic Fleet. Two years later, on 10 December 1925, the ship was placed in the Reserve Fleet at Devonport.

On 22 April 1930, the London Naval Treaty was signed, which limited total destroyer tonnage in the Royal Navy. The force was looking to introduce more modern destroyers and so needed to retire some of the older vessels. Senator was therefore chosen as one of twenty-two destroyers given to Thos. W. Ward of Sheffield in exchange for the liner RMS Majestic. In consequence, on 7 September 1936, the ship was handed over to be broken up at Jarrow.

== Pennant numbers ==
Penant numbers
Pennant number	Date
G36	June 1918
D44	September 1918
F35	January 1919
D02	1922
