= HMS Turbulent (1919) =

Destroyer of the Royal Navy

History

United Kingdom
- Name: HMS Turbulent
- Builder: Hawthorn Leslie and Company
- Laid down: 14 November 1917
- Launched: 29 May 1919
- Completed: 10 October 1919
- Decommissioned: 1936
- Fate: Handed over for scrapping, 25 August 1936

General characteristics
- Class & type: S-class destroyer
- Displacement: 1,075 long tons (1,092 t)
- Length: 276 ft (84 m) o/a
- Beam: 26 ft 8 in (8.13 m)
- Draught: 9 ft (2.7 m)
- Installed power: 27,000 shp (20,000 kW); 3 × Yarrow boilers
- Propulsion: 2 Shafts; 2 steam turbines
- Speed: 36 knots (67 km/h; 41 mph)
- Range: 2,750 nmi (5,090 km; 3,160 mi) at 15 knots (28 km/h; 17 mph)
- Complement: 90
- Armament: 3 × QF 4-inch (102 mm) Mark IV guns; 1 × QF 2-pounder (40 mm) "pom-pom" anti-aircraft gun; 2 × twin 21-inch (533 mm) torpedo tubes; 2 × single 18-inch (45 cm) torpedo tubes

HMS Turbulent was an S-class destroyer built for the Royal Navy during the First World War.

== Description ==
The S-class destroyers were improved versions of the preceding Modified R class. They displaced 1,075 long tons (1,092 t). The ships had an overall length of 276 feet (84.1 m), a beam of 26 feet 8 inches (8.1 m) and a draught of 9 feet (2.7 m). They were powered by two Brown-Curtis geared steam turbines, each driving one propeller shaft, using steam provided by two Yarrow boilers. The turbines developed a total of 27,000 shaft horsepower (20,000 kW) and gave a maximum speed of 36 knots (67 km/h; 41 mph). The ships carried a maximum of 301 long tons (306 t) of fuel oil that gave them a range of 2,750 nautical miles (5,090 km; 3,160 mi) at 15 knots (28 km/h; 17 mph). The ships' complement was 90 officers and ratings.

Turbulent was armed with three QF 4-inch (102 mm) Mark IV guns in single mounts and a single 2-pounder (40 mm) "pom-pom" anti-aircraft gun. The ship was fitted with two twin mounts for 21-inch (533 mm) torpedoes. Two additional single mounts were positioned abreast the bridge at the break of the forecastle for 18-inch (45 cm) torpedoes. All torpedo tubes were above water and traversed to fire.

== Construction and career ==
Turbulent was laid down on 14 November 1917 by Hawthorn Leslie and Company, launched on 29 May 1919 and completed on 10 October. The ship saw little or no active service before being struck in 1936. She was one of the obsolete destroyers handed over to the shipbreakers Thos. W. Ward in part-payment for RMS Majestic on 25 August 1936, and was then broken up at Inverkeithing.

== Bibliography ==
- Colledge, J. J.; Warlow, Ben (2006) [1969]. Ships of the Royal Navy: The Complete Record of All Fighting Ships of the Royal Navy from the 15th Century to the Present (3rd Rev ed.). London: Chatham Publishing. ISBN 978-1-86176-281-8. OCLC 67375475.
- Dittmar, F.J. & Colledge, J.J. (1972). British Warships 1914–1919. Shepperton, UK: Ian Allan. ISBN 0-7110-0380-7.
- Friedman, Norman (2009). British Destroyers: From Earliest Days to the Second World War. Barnsley, UK: Seaforth Publishing. ISBN 978-1-84832-049-9.
- Gardiner, Robert & Gray, Randal (1985). Conway's All The World's Fighting Ships 1906–1921. London: Conway Maritime Press. ISBN 0-85177-245-5.
- March, Edgar J. (1966). British Destroyers: A History of Development, 1892–1953; Drawn by Admiralty Permission From Official Records & Returns, Ships' Covers & Building Plans. London: Seeley Service. OCLC 164893555.
