= HMS Tilbury (1918) =

Destroyer of the Royal Navy

History

United Kingdom
- Name: HMS Tilbury
- Builder: Swan Hunter, Wallsend
- Laid down: November 1917
- Launched: 13 June 1918
- Completed: 17 September 1918
- Fate: Sold February 1931

General characteristics
- Class & type: S-class destroyer
- Displacement: 1,220 long tons (1,240 t) deep load
- Length: 276 ft 0 in (84.12 m) oa
- Beam: 26 ft 8 in (8.13 m)
- Draught: 9 ft 10 in (3.00 m)
- Installed power: 27,000 shp (20,000 kW)
- Propulsion: 3× Yarrow boilers; Parsons geared steam turbines; 2 shafts
- Speed: 36 kn (41 mph; 67 km/h)
- Complement: 90
- Armament: 3 × 4-inch (102 mm) guns; 4 × 21 inch (533 mm) torpedo tubes

HMS Tilbury was a S-class destroyer of the British Royal Navy that served during the First World War.

The boat badge is in the shape of a boar and is in the collection of the National Maritime Museum.

== Design and construction ==
The S-class were intended as a fast (36 knots (67 km/h; 41 mph) destroyer for service that would be cheaper than the large V-class destroyers that preceded them and so able to be ordered in large numbers. The ships were 276 feet (84.12 m) long overall and 265 feet (80.77 m) between perpendiculars, with a beam of 26 feet 8 inches (8.13 m) and a draught of 9 feet 10 inches (3.00 m). They displaced 1,000 long tons (1,000 t) normal and 1,220 long tons (1,240 t) deep load. Three Yarrow boilers fed Parsons geared steam turbines which drove two propeller shafts, and generated 27,000 shaft horsepower (20,000 kW), giving the required 36 knot speed.

The design gun armament of the S-class was three 4-inch (102 mm) guns and a single 2-pounder (40 mm) "pom-pom" anti-aircraft gun. Torpedo armament was four 21-inch (533 mm) torpedo tubes in two twin rotating mounts on the ships' centreline and two 18-inch (457 mm) tubes at the break of the forecastle for easily aimed snap-shots in close action. The ship had a crew of 90 officers and men.

On 23 June 1917, the Admiralty placed an order for 36 S-class destroyers under the Twelfth War Programme as a follow-on to the 33 S-class destroyers ordered in May that year under the Eleventh War Programme. Tilbury, one of three S-class destroyers ordered from Swan Hunter in the Twelfth War Programme, was laid down at their Wallsend shipyard in November 1917. She was launched on 17 June 1918 and completed on 17 September 1918.

== Service ==
On commission, Tilbury was sent to the Mediterranean, and was at Mudros in the Aegean Sea at the end of the war. Tilbury continued as part of the Sixth Destroyer Flotilla in the Mediterranean Fleet through 1919. The Royal Navy had a surplus of modern destroyers following the First World War, and by October 1920, Tilbury was listed as in reserve at the Nore. In 1923, she was in reserve at Portsmouth and in June 1928 was in Maintenance Reserve at Rosyth.

Tilbury was sold to the shipbreakers Ward in February 1931 for scrapping at their Llanelly yard.

== Bibliography ==
- Colledge, J. J.; Warlow, Ben (2006) [1969]. Ships of the Royal Navy: The Complete Record of All Fighting Ships of the Royal Navy from the 15th Century to the Present (3rd Rev ed.). London: Chatham Publishing. ISBN 978-1-86176-281-8. OCLC 67375475.
- Dittmar, F.J.; Colledge, J.J. (1972). British Warships 1914–1919. Shepperton, UK: Ian Allan. ISBN 0-7110-0380-7.
- Friedman, Norman (2009). British Destroyers: From Earliest Days to the Second World War. Barnsley, UK: Seaforth Publishing. ISBN 978-1-84832-049-9.
- Gardiner, Robert & Gray, Randal, eds. (1985). Conway's All The World's Fighting Ships 1906–1921. London: Conway Maritime Press. ISBN 0-85177-245-5.
- March, Edgar J. (1966). British Destroyers: A History of Development, 1892–1953; Drawn by Admiralty Permission From Official Records & Returns, Ships' Covers & Building Plans. London: Seeley Service. OCLC 164893555.
