= HMS Tintagel =

Royal Navy S class destroyer

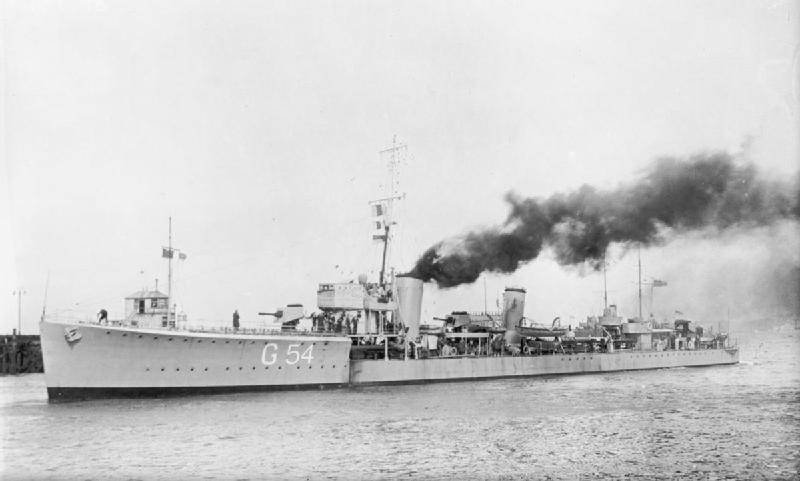
- Sister ship Tactician

History

United Kingdom
- Name: Tintagel
- Namesake: Tintagel
- Ordered: 7 April 1917
- Builder: Swan Hunter, Wallsend
- Laid down: Dec 1917
- Launched: 9 August 1918
- Completed: December 1918
- Out of service: 16 February 1932
- Fate: Sold to be broken up

General characteristics
- Class & type: S-class destroyer
- Displacement: 1,075 long tons (1,092 t) normal; 1,221 long tons (1,241 t) deep load
- Length: 265 ft (80.8 m) p.p.
- Beam: 26 ft 8 in (8.13 m)
- Draught: 9 ft 10 in (3.00 m) mean
- Propulsion: 3 Yarrow boilers; 2 geared Parsons steam turbines, 27,000 shp
- Speed: 36 knots (41.4 mph; 66.7 km/h)
- Range: 2,750 nmi (5,090 km) at 15 kn (28 km/h)
- Complement: 90
- Armament: 3 × single QF 4 in (102 mm) guns; 1 × single 2-pdr 40 mm (2 in) AA gun; 2 × twin 21 in (533 mm) torpedo tubes; 2 × single 18 in (457 mm) torpedo tubes; 4 × depth charge chutes

HMS Tintagel was an Admiralty S-class destroyer that served with the Royal Navy in the Second World War. The S class was a development of the R class created during the First World War as a cheaper alternative to the V and W class. Launched in 1918 shortly after the Armistice, the ship was commissioned into the Fourteenth Destroyer Flotilla of the Grand Fleet. However, the end of the war meant that destroyers were not needed in the front line to the same extent and Tintagel was recommissioned into the Reserve Fleet a year later. Between 1920 and 1921, the ship served with the torpedo school at Sheerness. In 1924, the vessel accompanied the submarine X1 on sea trials. After the London Naval Treaty of 1930, and the subsequent reduction in the Royal Navy's older destroyer force, Tintagel was retired and, in 1931, sold to be broken up in Plymouth.

== Design and development ==
Tintagel was one of 33 Admiralty S-class destroyers ordered by the British Admiralty on 7 April 1917 as part of the Eleventh War Construction Programme. The design was a development of the R class introduced at the same time as, and as a cheaper and faster alternative to, the V and W class. Differences with the R class were minor, such as having the searchlight moved aft and being designed to mount an additional pair of torpedo tubes.

The destroyer had a overall length of 276 ft (84 m) and a length of 265 ft (81 m) between perpendiculars. Beam was 26 ft 8 in (8.13 m) and mean draught 9 ft 10 in (3.00 m). Displacement was 1,075 long tons (1,092 t) normal and 1,221 long tons (1,241 t) deep load. Three Yarrow boilers fed steam to two sets of Parsons geared steam turbines rated at 27,000 shaft horsepower (20,000 kW) and driving two shafts, giving a design speed of 36 knots (67 km/h; 41 mph) at normal loading and 32.5 knots (60.2 km/h; 37.4 mph) at deep load. Two funnels were fitted. A full load of 301 long tons (306 t) of fuel oil was carried, which gave a design range of 2,750 nautical miles (5,090 km; 3,160 mi) at 15 knots (28 km/h; 17 mph). The ship had a complement of 90 officers and ratings.

Armament consisted of three QF 4 in (102 mm) Mk IV guns on the ship's centreline. One was mounted raised on the forecastle, one on a platform between the funnels, and one aft. The ship was also armed with a single 2-pounder 40 mm (1.6 in) "pom-pom" anti-aircraft gun for air defence. Four 21 in (533 mm) torpedo tubes were carried in two twin rotating mounts aft. Four depth charge chutes were also fitted aft. Initially, typically ten depth charges were carried. The ship mounted two additional 18 in (457 mm) torpedo tubes either side of the superstructure, controlled by the commander with toggle ropes. Fire control included a training-only director, single Dumaresq and a Vickers range clock.

== Construction and career ==
Laid down on 10 September 1917 during the First World War by Swan Hunter & Wigham Richardson at their dockyard in Wallsend on the River Tyne with the yard number 1083, Tintagel was launched on 9 August 1918 and completed in December shortly after the Armistice that ended the war. The vessel was the only one in Royal Navy service with the name. Tintagel was commissioned into the Grand Fleet, joining the Fourteenth Destroyer Flotilla. However, with the end of the war, the Royal Navy returned to a peacetime level of strength and both the number of ships and personnel needed to be reduced to save money. On 15 October 1919, the ship was recommissioned into the reserve fleet at Nore.

'Tintagel was transferred to Sheerness, arriving on 24 October 1920. The destroyer joined the Torpedo School. However, this role did not last long as, on 25 February 1922, it was announced that the school was to close. Tintagel returned to the reserve fleet at Nore. On 9 February 1925, the destroyer was tasked to accompany the new submarine X1 on sea trials. The trials were deemed a success. On 22 April 1930, the London Naval Treaty was signed, which limited total destroyer tonnage that the Royal Navy could operate. As the force was looking to introduce more modern destroyers, some of the older vessels needed to be retired. On 23 June 1931, the vessel was replaced as emergency destroyer at Plymouth by sister ship Scotsman. The ship was retired and, on 16 February 1932, the sold to be broken up by S Castle in Plymouth.

== Pennant numbers ==
Penant numbers
Pennant number	Date
G51	November 1918
D75	November 1919
H89	January 1922
