= HMAS Tattoo =

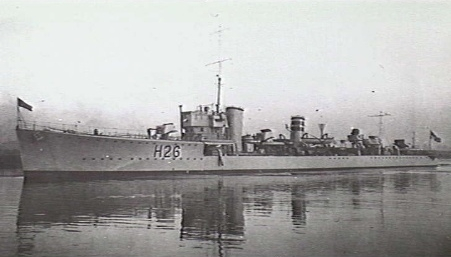
- HMAS Tattoo at Port Melbourne, c. 1920

History

Australia
- Namesake: Military tattoos
- Builder: William Beardmore and Company
- Laid down: 21 December 1917
- Launched: 28 December 1918
- Completed: 7 April 1919
- Commissioned: Royal Navy: April 1919; RAN: 27 January 1920
- Decommissioned: 30 June 1933
- Motto: Vestigia Nulla Retrorsum; No Steps Backward
- Fate: Sold for scrap on 4 June 1937

General characteristics
- Class & type: Admiralty S-class destroyer
- Displacement: 1,075 tons
- Length: 275 ft 11.25 in (84.1058 m) length overall
- Beam: 26 ft 9.75 in (8.1725 m)
- Propulsion: 3 × Yarrow boilers, Brown-Curtis turbines, 27,000 shp (20,000 kW), 2 shafts
- Speed: 36 knots (67 km/h; 41 mph) as designed; 33.75 knots (62.51 km/h; 38.84 mph) on power trails; 13 knots (24 km/h; 15 mph) economical
- Range: 2,589 nautical miles (4,795 km; 2,979 mi) at 13 knots (24 km/h; 15 mph)
- Complement: 6 officers, 93 sailors
- Armament: 3 × QF 4-inch Mk IV guns; 1 × 2-pounder pom-pom; 2 × 9.5-inch howitzers; 5 × .303-inch machine guns; 2 × twin 21-inch torpedo tube sets; 2 depth charge throwers; 4 depth charge chutes

HMAS Tattoo (H26) was an Admiralty S-class destroyer of the Royal Australian Navy (RAN). Built for the Royal Navy during World War I, the ship was not completed until 1919, and spent less than eight months in British service before being transferred to the RAN at the start of 1920. After arriving in Australia, Tattoo spent her entire career in Australian waters, and was placed in reserve on several occasions. Tattoo was decommissioned in 1936, and was sold for ship breaking in 1937.

== Design and construction ==
Tattoo was built to the Admiralty design of the S-class destroyer, which was designed and built as part of the British emergency war programme. The destroyer had a displacement of 1,075 tons, a length overall of 276 feet 11 1/4 inches (84.41 m), and a beam of 26 feet 9 3/4 inches (8.17 m). The propulsion machinery consisted of three Yarrow boilers feeding Brown-Curtis turbines, which supplied 27,000 shaft horsepower (20,000 kW) to the ship's two propeller shafts. Although designed with a maximum speed of 36 knots (67 km/h; 41 mph), Tattoo was only able to achieve 33.75 knots (62.51 km/h; 38.84 mph) on power trials. The destroyer's economical speed of 13 knots (24 km/h; 15 mph) gave her a range of 2,589 nautical miles (4,795 km; 2,979 mi). The ship's company was made up of 6 officers and 93 sailors.

The destroyer's primary armament consisted of three QF 4-inch Mark IV guns. These were supplemented by a 2-pounder pom-pom, two 9.5-inch howitzer bomb throwers, five .303 inch machine guns (a mix of Lewis and Maxim guns), two twin 21-inch torpedo tube sets, two depth charge throwers, and two depth charge chutes.

Tattoo was laid down by William Beardmore and Company, Limited, at Dalmuir in Scotland on 21 December 1917. The destroyer was launched on 28 December 1918, and completed on 7 April 1919. The ship was commissioned into the Royal Navy in April 1919, but was quickly marked for transfer to the RAN, along with four sister ships. Tattoo was commissioned into the RAN on 27 January 1920. There were plans to rename her HMAS Moresby, but these were cancelled in June 1930.

== Operational history ==
Tattoo and three of her sister ships sailed for Australia on 20 February, visiting ports in the Mediterranean, India, Singapore, and the Netherlands East Indies before reaching Sydney on 29 April. The destroyer was placed in reserve in October 1921, then was reactivated on 12 March 1926 for a six-week period. She was to be fully decommissioned on 26 March 1928, but this was cancelled in favour of decommissioning HMAS Anzac. Tattoo was recommissioned on 13 July 1931. She was returned to reserve on 30 June 1933, and was briefly reactivated in October of that year to assist in torpedo re-ranging trials. On 8 January 1935, the destroyer was assigned to Flinders Naval Depot, and was moved in and out of commission as required for training.

== Decommissioning and fate ==
Tattoo paid off for the final time on 19 June 1936. She was sold to Penguins Limited for ship breaking on 4 June 1937.
