= HMS Seafire =

Destroyer of the Royal Navy

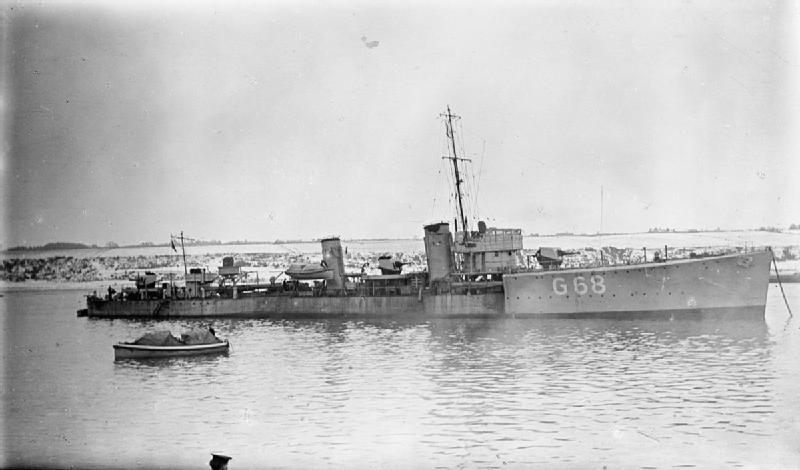
- Seafire circa 1918

History

United Kingdom
- Name: Seafire
- Ordered: July 1917
- Builder: John Brown & Company, Clydebank
- Yard number: 478
- Laid down: 27 February 1918
- Launched: 10 August 1918
- Commissioned: November 1918
- Fate: Sold for scrap, 14 September 1936

General characteristics (as built)
- Class & type: S-class destroyer
- Displacement: 1,000 long tons (1,016 t) (normal)
- Length: 276 ft (84.1 m) o/a
- Beam: 26 ft 8 in (8.1 m)
- Draught: 9 ft 10 in (3 m)
- Installed power: 3 × Yarrow boilers; 27,000 shp (20,000 kW)
- Propulsion: 2 Shafts; 1 steam turbine
- Speed: 34 knots (63 km/h; 39 mph)
- Range: 2,100 nmi (3,900 km; 2,400 mi) at 15 knots (28 km/h; 17 mph)
- Complement: 82
- Armament: 3 × single 4 in (102 mm) guns; 1 × single 2 pdr (40 mm (1.6 in)) AA guns; 2 × twin 21 in (533 mm) torpedo tubes; 2 × single 18 in (450 mm) torpedo tubes

HMS Seafire was an S-class destroyer built for the Royal Navy during the First World War. She saw service during the Allied intervention in the Russian Civil War. The ship was sold for scrap in 1936.

== Description ==
The Admiralty S class were larger and faster versions of the preceding R class. The ships had an overall length of 276 feet (84.1 m), a beam of 26 feet 8 inches (8.1 m) and a deep draught of 9 feet 10 inches (3 m). They displaced 1,000 long tons (1,016 t) at normal load. The ships' complement was 82 officers and ratings.

The ships were powered by a single Brown-Curtis geared steam turbine that drove two propeller shafts using steam provided by three Yarrow boilers. The turbines developed a total of 27,000 shaft horsepower (20,000 kW) and gave a maximum speed of 36 knots (67 km/h; 41 mph). Seafire reached a speed of 33.8 knots (62.6 km/h; 38.9 mph) from 28,464 shp (21,226 kW) during her sea trials. The ships carried enough fuel oil to give them a range of 3,500 nautical miles (6,500 km; 4,000 mi) at 15 knots (28 km/h; 17 mph).

The Admiralty S-class ships were armed with three single QF 4-inch (102 mm) Mark IV guns. One gun was positioned on the forecastle, the second was on a platform between the funnels and the third at the stern. They were equipped with a single QF 2-pounder (40 mm (1.6 in)) "pom-pom" anti-aircraft gun on a platform forward of the mainmast. They were also fitted with two rotating twin mounts for 21-inch (533 mm) torpedoes amidships and two 18-inch (450 mm) torpedo tubes, one on each broadside abaft the forecastle.

== Construction and career ==
Seafire, the first ship of her name to serve in the Royal Navy, was ordered in June 1917 as part of the Twelfth War Programme from John Brown & Company. The ship was laid down at the company's Clydebank shipyard on 27 February 1918, launched on 10 August and commissioned in November.

After commissioning, Seafire joined the 14th Destroyer Flotilla of the Grand Fleet. She remained part of the 14th Flotilla in February 1919, but following a post-war reorganisation of the Royal Navy's destroyer forces, Seafire was listed as part of the 7th Destroyer Flotilla at the beginning of March 1919. Later that month, Seafire, commanded by Commander Andrew Browne Cunningham, later an Admiral of the Fleet, formed part of a force of two light cruisers and ten destroyers under the overall command of Admiral Walter Cowan, which was sent to the Baltic Sea as part of the British intervention in the Russian Civil War. Seafire sailed with only 60 per cent of her normal crew, in a reflection of the Royal Navy's manning problems after the end of the First World War. On 3 April, Seafire arrived at Liepāja, Latvia, and was then sent to Ventspils, which was threatened by the advancing Bolshevik forces. Seafire set up soup kitchens to help feed the starving population of Ventspils, using up most of her rations, before returning to Liepāja after four days. On 16 April, Baltic Germans staged a Coup d'Etat in Latvia. Seafire, still at Liepāja, prevented the Baltic German forces from capturing the transport Saratov, carrying a load of arms and ammunition intended for the armies of the new Baltic states, and helped members of the provisional national government to escape to Saratov, which was protected by the Royal Navy. On 13 May, Cowan's flagship Curacoa was badly damaged when she struck a mine while on passage from Reval (now Tallinn) to Liepāja. Seafire escorted Curacoa back to Britain. In June, Seafire was still listed as part of the 7th Destroyer Flotilla at Rosyth, now part of the Reserve Fleet. Seafire transferred to the 5th Destroyer Flotilla in October 1919, but on 14 November, she was reduced to reserve at Devonport.

She was one of the obsolete destroyers handed over to the shipbreakers Thos. W. Ward in part-payment for RMS Majestic on 14 September 1936, and was then broken up at Inverkeithing.

== Bibliography ==
- Bennett, Geoffrey (2002). Freeing the Baltic. Edinburgh: Birlinn. ISBN 1-84341-001-X.
- Colledge, J. J.; Warlow, Ben (2006) [1969]. Ships of the Royal Navy: The Complete Record of All Fighting Ships of the Royal Navy from the 15th Century to the Present (3rd Rev ed.). London: Chatham Publishing. ISBN 978-1-86176-281-8. OCLC 67375475.
- Dittmar, F.J. & Colledge, J.J. (1972). British Warships 1914–1919. Shepperton, UK: Ian Allan. ISBN 0-7110-0380-7.
- Dunn, Steve R. (2020). Battle in the Baltic: The Royal Navy and the Fight to Save Estonia & Latvia 1918–1920. Barnsley, UK: Seaforth Publishing. ISBN 978-1-5267-4273-5.
- Friedman, Norman (2009). British Destroyers: From Earliest Days to the Second World War. Barnsley, UK: Seaforth Publishing. ISBN 978-1-84832-049-9.
- Gardiner, Robert & Gray, Randal (1985). Conway's All The World's Fighting Ships 1906–1921. London: Conway Maritime Press. ISBN 0-85177-245-5.
- March, Edgar J. (1966). British Destroyers: A History of Development, 1892–1953; Drawn by Admiralty Permission From Official Records & Returns, Ships' Covers & Building Plans. London: Seeley Service. OCLC 164893555.
- Manning, T. D. (1961). The British Destroyer. London: Putnam.
