= HMS Trusty (1918) =

Royal Navy S class destroyer

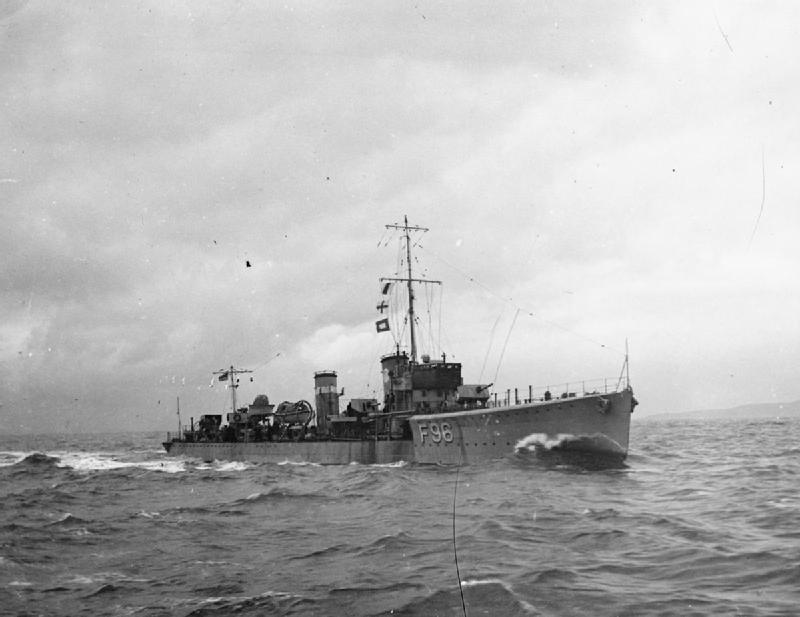
- Sister ship Sturdy in c. 1919

History

United Kingdom
- Name: HMS Trusty
- Ordered: June 1917
- Builder: J. Samuel White], East Cowes
- Yard number: 1514
- Laid down: 11 April 1918
- Launched: 6 November 1918
- Completed: 9 May 1919
- Out of service: 25 September 1936
- Fate: Sold to be broken up

General characteristics
- Class & type: S-class destroyer
- Displacement: 1,075 long tons (1,092 t) normal; 1,220 long tons (1,240 t) deep load
- Length: 265 ft (80.8 m) p.p.
- Beam: 26 ft 8 in (8.13 m)
- Draught: 9 ft 10 in (3.00 m) mean
- Propulsion: 3 White-Forster boilers; 2 geared Brown-Curtis steam turbines, 27,000 shp
- Speed: 36 knots (41.4 mph; 66.7 km/h)
- Range: 2,750 nmi (5,090 km) at 15 kn (28 km/h)
- Complement: 90
- Armament: 3 × QF 4-inch (101.6 mm) Mark IV guns, mounting P Mk. IX; 1 × single 2-pounder (40-mm) "pom-pom" Mk. II anti-aircraft gun; 4 × 21 in (533 mm) torpedo tubes (2×2); 2 × 18 in (457 mm) torpedo tubes (2×1) (removed)

HMS Trusty was an S-class destroyer that served with the Royal Navy. The vessel was the third of the name. Launched in November 1918 just before the Armistice that ended the First World War, Trusty joined the Home Fleet the following year. However, the destroyer did remain in service long and was transferred to the Reserve Fleet in 1920. The vessel remained in reserve until 25 September 1936, although in a deteriorating condition. On that day, Trusty was sold to be broken up as part of a deal for the liner Majestic.

== Design and development ==
Trusty was one of thirty-three Admiralty S class destroyers ordered by the British Admiralty in June 1917 as part of the Twelfth War Construction Programme. The design was a development of the R class introduced as a cheaper and faster alternative to the V and W class. Differences with the R class were minor, such as having the searchlight moved aft.

Trusty had an overall length of 276 ft (84 m) and a length of 265 ft (81 m) between perpendiculars. Beam was 26 ft 8 in (8.13 m) and draught 9 ft 10 in (3.00 m). Displacement was 1,075 long tons (1,092 t) normal and 1,220 long tons (1,240 t) deep load. Three White-Forster boilers fed steam to two sets of Brown-Curtis geared steam turbines rated at 27,000 shaft horsepower (20,000 kW) and driving two shafts, giving a design speed of 36 knots (67 km/h; 41 mph) at normal loading and 32.5 knots (60.2 km/h; 37.4 mph) at deep load. Two funnels were fitted. The ship carried 301 long tons (306 t) of fuel oil, which gave a design range of 2,750 nautical miles (5,090 km; 3,160 mi) at 15 knots (28 km/h; 17 mph).

Armament consisted of three QF 4-inch (102 mm) Mk IV guns on the ship's centreline. One was mounted raised on the forecastle, one between the funnels and one aft. The ship also mounted a single 40-millimetre (1.6 in) 2-pounder pom-pom anti-aircraft gun for air defence. Four 21-inch (533 mm) tubes were fitted in two twin rotating mounts aft. The ship was designed to mount two additional 18-inch (457 mm) torpedo tubes either side of the superstructure but this required the forecastle plating to be cut away, making the vessel very wet, so they were soon removed. The weight saved enabled the heavier Mark V 21-inch torpedo to be carried. The ship had a complement of 90 officers and ratings.

== Construction and career ==
Trusty was laid down by J. Samuel White at East Cowes on the Isle of Wight with the yard number 1514 on 11 April 1918, and launched on 6 November the same year, just five days before the Armistice which ended the First World War. The ship was the third to enter Royal Navy service with the name. On completion on 9 May the following year, Trusty was allocated to the Fourth Destroyer Flotilla of the Home Fleet. The ship did not remain long in service, however, and was commissioned into the Reserve Fleet at Portsmouth on 24 August 1920. Like many of the class stored in reserve, the ship deteriorated and by the middle of the next decade was considered by the Admiralty to be in too poor condition to return to operations. Trusty was therefore chosen as one of twenty-two destroyers which were given to Thos. W. Ward of Sheffield in exchange for the liner Majestic. The ship was sold on 25 September 1936 and subsequently broken up at Inverkeithing.

== Pennant numbers ==
Pennant numbers
Pennant number	Date
FA2	May 1919
H56	December 1920
