= S-class destroyer (1917) =

Class of destroyers built for the Royal Navy

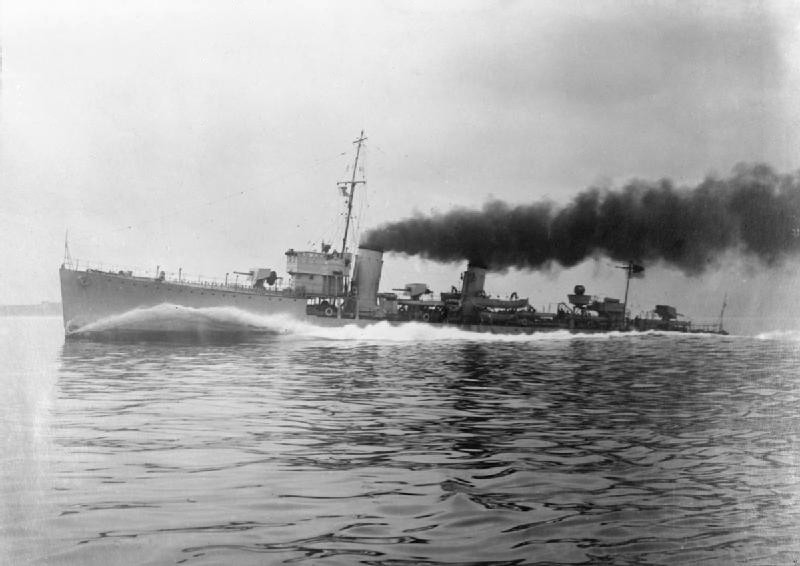
- Tenedos underway at high speed, 1921

Class overview
- Builders: Alexander Stephen and Sons, Linthouse; John Brown & Company, Clydebank; William Denny & Brothers, Dumbarton; Swan Hunter & Wigham Richardson, Wallsend on Tyne; William Doxford & Sons, Sunderland; Fairfield Shipbuilding & Engineering Company, Govan; Palmers Shipbuilding & Iron Company, Hebburn on Tyne; Scott's Shipbuilding & Engineering Company, Greenock; J. Samuel White & Company, Cowes; William Beardmore & Company, Dalmuir; R. & W. Hawthorn Leslie & Company, Hebburn on Tyne; John I. Thornycroft & Company, Woolston; Yarrow and Company, Scotstoun
- Operators: Royal Navy; Royal Australian Navy; Royal Canadian Navy; Imperial Japanese Navy
- Preceded by: R class W class
- Succeeded by: Modified W class
- Subclasses: Thornycroft and Yarrow "specials"
- In commission: 1918–1945
- Planned: 69
- Completed: 67
- Canceled: 2
- Lost: 6 wrecked or sunk; 2 constructive total loss; 1 captured (later returned)

General characteristics
- Displacement: 1,000 tons (normal); 1,220 tons (full load)
- Length: 265 ft (80.8 m) (pp); 276 ft (84.1 m) (oa)
- Beam: 26 ft 8 in (8.1 m)
- Draught: 9 ft 10 in (3.0 m)
- Installed power: 27,000 shp (20,134 kW)
- Propulsion: 2 shafts; 2 geared turbines; 3 × Yarrow boilers; 301 oil fuel
- Speed: 32.5 knots (60.2 km/h; 37.4 mph) (deep); 36 knots (67 km/h; 41 mph) (normal)
- Range: 2,750 nmi (5,090 km; 3,160 mi) at 15 knots (28 km/h; 17 mph)
- Complement: 90
- Armament: 3 × QF 4-inch (102 mm) Mark IV guns on C.P. III mounting (120 rounds per gun); 1 × QF 2-pounder (40 mm) "pom-pom" anti-aircraft gun on H.A.II mounting (1000 rounds); 1 x 0.303 in (8 mm) Maxim machine gun (5000 rounds); 4 × 21 in (533 mm) Mk.IV torpedo tubes (two twin mounts); 4 Mk.II or Mk. IV torpedoes.; 2 × 18 in (457 mm) torpedo tubes (two single mounts); cold torpedoes (Note: Some sources (e.g. Jane's (1919) and Dittmar and College) state they were 14-inch tubes, which is unlikely since there were no 14-inch torpedoes in RN service in 1918 . March, Friedman, Jane's (1920) and Conway's all give 18-inch as the calibre. The 18-inch cold torpedoes (i.e. compressed air powered, rather than "heater torpedoes") had a warhead of 320 lb (150 kg) of Trotyl; (presumably they were Mk.VI weapons).).; 4 depth charge chutes (two manual, two hydraulic)

The S class (initially known as the Modified Trenchant class) was a class of 67 destroyers ordered for the Royal Navy in 1917 under the 11th and 12th Emergency War Programmes. They saw active service in the last months of the First World War and in the Russian and Irish Civil Wars during the early 1920s. Most were relegated to the reserve by the mid-1920s and subsequently scrapped under the terms of the London Naval Treaty. Eleven survivors saw much action during the Second World War.

== Background ==
In early 1917, the First World War had been going on for two and a half years. Despite the disappointing outcome of the Battle of Jutland the previous year, the British Grand Fleet, consisting of battleships, cruisers, and destroyers and based in northern Scotland, was successfully confining the German surface navy to the German Bight, while enforcing a blockade of German maritime trade with the wider world. In southern North Sea, the Harwich Force and the Dover Patrol, both consisting of cruisers and destroyers, maintained control of the eastern approaches to the English Channel and the Thames Estuary and safeguarded British communications with France. German submarine attacks on British trade became increasingly effective during the autumn of 1916, and unrestricted submarine warfare was soon to begin; finding effective countermeasures was increasingly taxing for the Admiralty. In the Mediterranean, the Royal Navy provided support to the French and Italian Fleets countering the threat posed by the Austro-Hungarian and Turkish fleets. All of these diverse naval commitments placed huge demands on the Royal Navy's resources; in particular, the need for large numbers of destroyers was pressing.

Since mid-1916, destroyer production had concentrated on the large and powerful V and W classes, intended to match large German destroyers reported to be under construction. However, the Admiralty had come to appreciate that these intelligence reports had been overstated, thus the next orders could revert to the smaller destroyers of the Modified R class of March 1916, which could be built in large numbers quickly and cheaply. The resultant design, formulated in February 1917, incorporated some wartime lessons and suggestions from destroyer officers serving with the fleet, thus was identified as a new class.

== Design and construction ==
The new class had two funnels, a long forecastle and a tall bridge, which unusually, was located behind the break in the main deck. Following consultations with sea-going officers, several novel features were included, principally to enhance sea-keeping capabilities in rough weather and battle-worthiness in night action. Consideration was given to having a well deck forward of the bridge with an additional pair of torpedo tubes, in the fashion of contemporary German ocean-going torpedo boats, but this arrangement was rejected because it would be detrimental to ship handling in rough weather. (Note: Contemporary German torpedo boats of the 1916M type also deleted the well deck forward, for similar reasons.) The design had a heavily raked stem and sheer forward, a slight turtleback on the fo'c's'le deck, and a rounded bridge front, intended to deflect waves. Two single 18-inch (450 mm) torpedo tubes were fitted under the bridge on single rotating mounts port and starboard, intended to be fired directly by the commanding officer with toggle ropes during night actions, and the searchlight was relocated aft, mounted on top of the aft torpedo tubes (this to avoid the bridge officers being blinded by its glare during night actions). The single 18-inch torpedo tubes proved to be of little use, and were soon removed in the majority of vessels as a weight-saving measure (only Tara, Tintagel, and Trojan retained theirs).

The S class was built in two batches, the first 33 ordered on 9 April 1917 and the second batch of 36 in June 1917, respectively. Most were built to the design prepared by the Admiralty ("Admiralty S class"), finalized on 3 July 1917. As was common practice during the First World War, the Admiralty allowed two specialist destroyer builders, Thornycrofts and Yarrows a free hand to develop their own designs based on the current Admiralty designs, which other yards were contracted to build. Generally, these "specials" had considerably higher speeds; this performance enhancement stemmed largely from the higher quality of workmanship practiced by these specialist builders, rather than due to deficiencies of the Admiralty designs. Thus the seven vessels ordered from Yarrow were built to a distinct design ("Yarrow S class"); similarly the five ordered from Thornycroft were the "Thornycroft S class".

=== Engineering ===
Most of the Admiralty S class had Brown-Curtis single-reduction geared turbines; seven vessels (Steadfast, Sterling, Stonehenge, Stormcloud, Tilbury, Tintagel, and Strenuous) had Parsons Impulse-Reaction turbines, instead. Three Yarrow boilers (maximum pressure 250 psi (1,700 kPa)) were fitted in all except the vessels built by Whites (which had White-Forster boilers). The highest trial speed of the Admiralty S class was 35.837 knots (66.370 km/h; 41.240 mph) recorded by Senator (with 28,076 shaft horsepower (20,936.3 kW), 360.1 rpm) at a displacement of 1,019 tons.

=== Aircraft ===
Senator conducted trials in June 1918 to test the feasibility of a flying off platform aft, with the intent of launching an aircraft with the ship proceeding full speed astern; however, the amount of spray rendered this proposal unworkable. Later (c. 1927–28) both Stronghold and Thanet were fitted with a cordite catapult for launching aircraft from their fo'c's'le (the forward gun was removed); they were used to test the Larynx, an early experimental type of cruise missile.

Various S-class destroyers were used at different times during the 1920s and 1930s as attendant vessels for aircraft carriers: Searcher in the Mediterranean Fleet and Tyrian, Sesame, Sturdy, and Stronghold in the Home Fleet. Their armament was removed (in order to lighten the ship for maximum speed), and a davit installed on the fo'c's'le for recovery of ditched aircraft.

=== Target ship control vessel ===
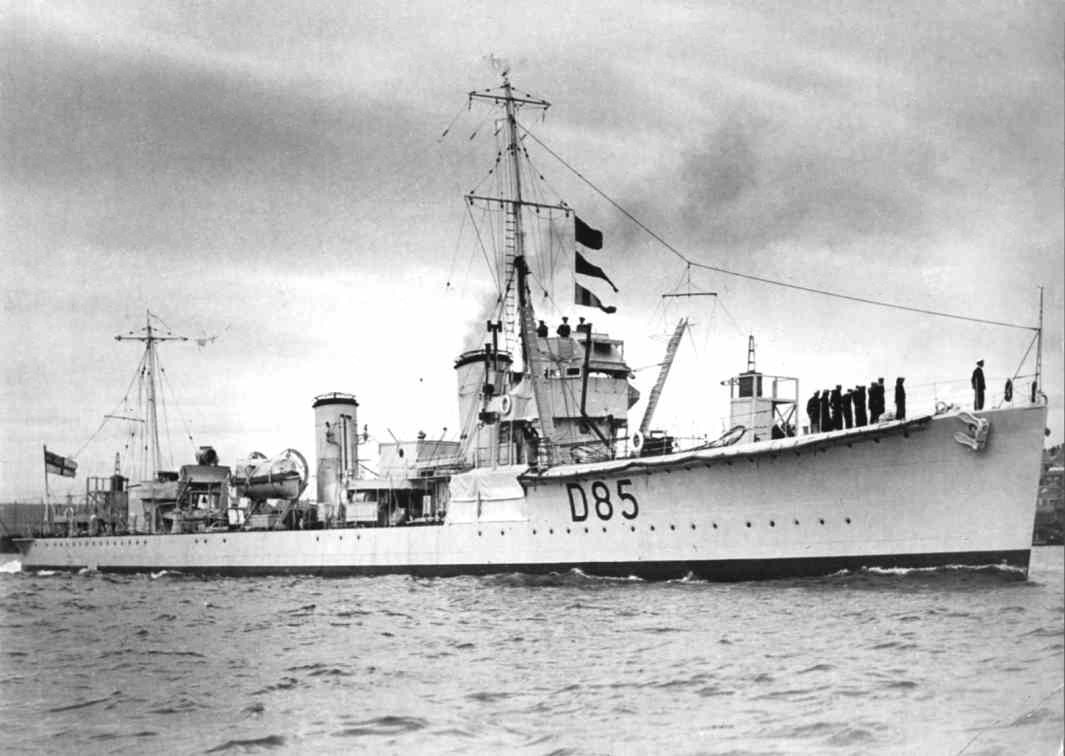
Shikari, 1929, showing her configuration as a control ship for radio-controlled targets

Shikari was completed in 1924 with the special role as a control vessel for the fleet's target ships (initially Agamemnon, replaced by Centurion in 1926). All armament was removed and a radio transmitter antenna added. She served in this role until the outbreak of the Second World War, when she was refitted as an operational unit.

=== Naming ===
The class, initially referred to as the "Modified Trenchant class", was officially named the "S class" by the Admiralty Board in November 1917 (even though 26 out of 67 vessels had names beginning with T). Some of the R class also had names beginning with S or T, which can be a source of confusion.

Some had rather obscure names: Sardonyx is a red onyx gemstone; Seabear (incorrectly spelt Sea Bear in some sources) is an archaic term for polar bear; Seafire is a term for marine bioluminescence; Seawolf is an archaic term for various species of voracious fish (such as the wolffish) or marine mammals (such as the elephant seal or sea lion); Sepoy was an infantryman of the Indian army; Seraph is a type of angel; Serapis was an ancient Graeco-Egyptian god; Shikari is an Urdu term for a big game hunter or hunting guide in British India; Simoom (incorrectly spelt Simoon in some sources) is a dry desert wind in the Sahara (there was also an R Class destroyer of this name, sunk on 23 January 1917); Sirdar is a Persian title of nobility used to denote princes, noblemen, and other aristocrats; it was used as the title for the commander of the Anglo-Egyptian Army; Tara was the traditional seat of the High King of Ireland; Tryphon (Τρύφων) is a Greek given name, meaning 'gentle' or 'sweet' (famous historical figures bearing the name include a Seleucid Emperor of the second Century BCE, a Greek grammarian in the first century BCE, and a 3rd Century Christian Saint); Tyrian is a precious type of purple dye used in regal robes in antiquity.

Sterling was originally ordered with the name Stirling, apparently due to a typing error.

== Ships in the class ==
Abbreviations: BU:broken up for scrap; RAN: Royal Australian Navy; RCN: Royal Canadian Navy; IJN: Imperial Japanese Navy.

=== Admiralty S class ===
Admiralty S-class
Name	Pendant (Note: During this era Royal Navy ships were allocated an alpha-numeric identifying code group called a pendant number which was painted on the ship's side and displayed by signal flags. The initial letter, called a flag superior, was usually followed by two numbers. The column headed "WWI" are the pendant numbers allocated on completion during or shortly after World War I; the column headed ">1922" are the pendant numbers used after c.1922.)		Ordered	Builder	Laid down	Launched	Completed	Fate
Name	WWI	>1922	Ordered	Builder	Laid down	Launched	Completed	Fate
Simoom	G.44	H.53	7 Apr 1917	Clydebank	30 May 1917	26 Jan 1918	Mar 1918	Sold 8 Jan 1931; BU, Metal Ind., Charlestown.
Scimitar	G.41	H.21	7 Apr 1917	Clydebank	30 May 1917	27 Feb 1918	13 Apr 1918	Sold 1947; BU Ward, Briton Ferry.
Scotsman	G.30	H.52	7 Apr 1917	Clydebank	10 Dec 1917	30 Mar 1918	21 May 1918	to Ward (Note: transferred to Ward's shipbreakers in exchange for the former ocean liner RMS Majestic, which the Royal Navy acquired for use as a static training ship at Rosyth.), 13 Jul 1937; BU Briton Ferry.
Scout	G.35	H.51	7 Apr 1917	Clydebank	25 Oct 1917	27 Apr 1918	15 Jun 1918	Sold 11 Feb 1946; BU Ward, Briton Ferry.
Senator	G.36 (Note: D.44 (Sep 1918).)	D.02	7 Apr 1917	Denny	10 Jul 1917	2 Apr 1918	7 Jun 1918	to Ward, 7 Sep 1936; BU Briton Ferry.
Sepoy	G.26	D.03	7 Apr 1917	Denny	6 Aug 1917	22 May 1918	6 Aug 1918	Sold 2 Jul 1932; BU Cashmore, Newport.
Seraph	G.60	D.04	7 Apr 1917	Denny	4 Oct 1917	8 Jul 1918	25 Dec 1918	Sold May 1934; BU Ward, Pembroke Dock
Shamrock	F.50	H.06	7 Apr 1917	Doxford	Nov 1917	26 Aug 1918	16 Sep 1919	to Ward, 23 Nov 1936; BU Milford Haven.
Shikari	–	D.85	7 Apr 1917	Doxford	15 Jan 1918	14 Jul 1919	Apr 1924 (Note: Completed at Chatham Dockyard.)	Sold 13 Sep 1945; BU Cashmore, Newport.
Success	F.1A	H.5A	7 Apr 1917	Doxford	1917	29 Jun 1918	Apr 1919	to RAN, Apr 1919. Sold, 4 Jun 1937; BU.
Sikh	H.94 (Note: D.68 (later).)	D.06	7 Apr 1917	Fairfield	Aug 1917	7 May 1918	29 Jun 1918	Sold 26 Jul 1927; BU Granton S. Bkg. Co.
Sirdar	G.27	D.59	7 Apr 1917	Fairfield	Aug 1917	6 Jul 1918	6 Sep 1918	Sold 4 May 1934; BU Cashmore, Newport.
Somme	G.52	D.07	7 Apr 1917	Fairfield	Nov 1917	10 Sep 1918	4 Nov 1918	Sold 25 Aug 1932; BU Ward, Pembroke Dock.
Steadfast	F.99	H.37	7 Apr 1917	Palmers	Sep 1917	8 Aug 1918	Mar 1919	Sold 28 Jul 1934; BU Metal Ind., Charlestown.
Sterling (Note: ordered as Stirling)	F.A3	H.31	7 Apr 1917	Palmers	Oct 1917	8 Oct 1918	Mar 1919	Sold for breaking up 25 Aug 1932.
Swallow	F.73	D.14	7 Apr 1917	Scott	Sep 1917	1 Aug 1918	27 Sep 1918	to Ward, 24 Sep 1936; BU Inverkeithing.
Swordsman	F.3A	H.8A	7 Apr 1917	Scott	1917	28 Dec 1918	Mar 1919	to RAN, Apr 1919. Scuttled, 8 Feb 1939.
Sabre	G.56	H.18	7 Apr 1917	Stephen	10 Sep 1917	23 Sep 1918	9 Nov 1918 (Note: completed by Fairfield (Govan).)	Sold Nov 1945; BU Brunton, Grangemouth.
Saladin	F.0A	H.54	7 Apr 1917	Stephen	10 Sep 1917	17 Feb 1919	11 Apr 1919	Sold 29 Jun 1947; BU Rees, Llanelli.
Shark	F.A1	D.05	7 Apr 1917	Swan Hunter	Sep 1917	9 Apr 1918	10 Jul 1918	Sold 5 Feb 1931; BU Ward, Inverkeithing.
Sparrowhawk	G.53	D.08	7 Apr 1917	Swan Hunter	Sep 1917	14 May 1918	4 Sep 1918	Sold 5 Feb 1931; BU Ward, Grays.
Splendid	G.57	D.11	7 Apr 1917	Swan Hunter	Sep 1917	10 Jul 1918	Oct 1918	Sold 8 Jan 1931; BU Metal Ind., Charlestown.
Tribune	F.9A	D.16	7 Apr 1917	White	21 Aug 1917	28 Mar 1918	16 Jul 1918	Sold 17 Dec 1931, BU Cashmore, Newport.
Trinidad	G.38	D.17	7 Apr 1917	White	15 Sep 1917	8 Apr 1918	9 Sep 1918	Sold 16 Feb 1932, BU Ward, Inverkeithing.
Tactician	G.54	H.99	Jun 1917	Beardmore	21 Nov 1917	7 Aug 1918	23 Oct 1918	Sold Feb 1931; BU Metal Ind., Charlestown.
Tara	G.62	H.92	Jun 1917	Beardmore	21 Nov 1917	12 Oct 1918	9 Dec 1918	Sold 17 Dec 1931; BU Rees, Llanelli.
Tasmania	G.97	H.7A	Jun 1917	Beardmore	18 Dec 1917	22 Nov 1918	29 Jan 1919	to RAN, Apr 1919. Sold 4 Jun 1937; BU.
Tattoo	F.2A	H.6A	Jun 1917	Beardmore	21 Dec 1917	28 Dec 1918	7 Apr 1919	to RAN, Apr 1919. Sold 4 Jun 1937; BU.
Scythe	G.32	H.22	Jun 1917	Clydebank	14 Jan 1918	25 May 1918	8 Jul 1918	Sold 28 Nov 1931; BU Cashmore.
Seabear	G.29 (Note: F.48 (1920).)	H.23	Jun 1917	Clydebank	13 Dec 1917	6 Jul 1918	Sep 1918	Sold, 5 Feb 1931; BU Ward, Grays.
Seafire	G.68	H.19	Jun 1917	Clydebank	27 Feb 1918	10 Aug 1918	Nov 1918	to Ward, 14 Sep 1936; BU Inverkeithing.
Searcher	G.72	H.20	Jun 1917	Clydebank	30 Mar 1918	11 Sep 1918	Nov 1918	Sold 25 Mar 1936; BU Ward, Barrow.
Seawolf	G.47	H.07	Jun 1917	Clydebank	30 Apr 1918	2 Nov 1918	Jan 1919 Guardship Cork Harbour 1923	Sold 23 Feb 1931; BU Cashmore.
Serapis	F.21	D.58	Jun 1917	Denny	4 Dec 1917	17 Sep 1918	21 Mar 1919	Sold 25 Jan 1934; BU Rees, Llanelli.
Serene	F.7A	H.25	Jun 1917	Denny	2 Feb 1918	30 Nov 1918	30 Apr 1919	to Ward, 14 Sep 1936; BU Inverkeithing.
Sesame	F.5A	H.35	Jun 1917	Denny	13 Mar 1918	30 Dec 1918	28 Mar 1919	Sold 4 May 1934; BU Cashmore.
Spear	G.55	D.09	Jun 1917	Fairfield	Mar 1918	9 Nov 1918	17 Dec 1918	Sold 13 Jul 1926; BU Alloa, Charlestown.
Spindrift	G.21	H.57	Jun 1917	Fairfield	Apr 1918	30 Dec 1918	2 Apr 1919	Sold Jul 1936; BU Ward, Inverkeithing.
Tenedos	F.A4	H.04	Jun 1917	Hawthorn	6 Dec 1917	21 Oct 1918	11 Jun 1919	Lost, Colombo, Ceylon, 5 Apr 1942; BU 1944.
Thanet	G.24	H.29	Jun 1917	Hawthorn	13 Dec 1917	5 Nov 1918	30 Aug 1919	Lost off Endau, Malaya, 27 Jan 1942.
Thracian	G.A4	D.86	Jun 1917	Hawthorn	17 Jan 1918	5 Mar 1920	21 Apr 1920 (Note: Completed at Sheerness Dockyard.)	IJN, Oct 1942 – Sep 1945; Sold Feb 46; BU.
Turbulent	F.55 (Note: D.92 (Nov 1919).)	H.34	Jun 1917	Hawthorn	14 Nov 1917	29 May 1919	10 Oct 1919	to Ward, 25 Aug 1936; BU Inverkeithing.
Stonehenge	G.99	–	Jun 1917	Palmers	Mar 1918	19 Mar 1919	Sep 1919	Wrecked near Smyrna 6 Nov 1920.
Stormcloud	D.89	H.05	Jun 1917	Palmers	May 1918	30 May 1919	28 Jan 1920	Sold 28 Jul 1934; BU Metal Ind., Charlestown.
Strenuous	G.64	H.03	Jun 1917	Scott	Mar 1918	9 Nov 1918	Jan 1919	Sold 25 Aug 1932; BU Alloa, Charlestown.
Stronghold	F.8A	H.50	Jun 1917	Scott	Mar 1918	6 May 1919	2 Jul 1919	Lost, south of Java, 4 Mar 1942.
Sturdy	F.96	H.28	Jun 1917	Scott	Apr 1918	26 Jun 1919	15 Oct 1919	Wrecked off Tiree, 30 Oct 1940.
Sardonyx	F.34	H.26	Jun 1917	Stephen	25 Mar 1918	27 May 1919	12 Jul 1919	Sold 1945; BU Ward, Preston, Sep 1945.
Saturn	—N/a	—N/a	Jun 1917	Stephen	—N/a	—N/a	—N/a	order cancelled 1919.
Sycamore	—N/a	—N/a	Jun 1917	Stephen	—N/a	—N/a	—N/a	order cancelled 1919.
Sportive	G.48	D.12	Jun 1917	Swan Hunter	Feb 1918	19 Sep 1918	Dec 1918	to Ward, 25 Sep 1936; BU Inverkeithing.
Stalwart	F.4A	H.4A	Jun 1917	Swan Hunter	Apr 1918	23 Oct 1918	Apr 1919	to RAN, Apr 1919. Scuttled, 22 Jul 1939.
Tilbury	G.37	H.38	Jun 1917	Swan Hunter	Nov 1917	13 Jun 1918	17 Sep 1918	Sold Feb 1931; BU Rees, Llanelli.
Tintagel	G.51	H.89	Jun 1917	Swan Hunter	Dec 1917	9 Aug 1918	Dec 1918	Sold 16 Feb 1932; Castle, Plymouth
Trojan	G.66	H.44	Jun 1917	White	3 Jan 1918	20 Jul 1918	6 Dec 1918	to Ward, 24 Sep 1936; BU Inverkeithing.
Truant	G.23	H.98	Jun 1917	White	14 Feb 1918	18 Sep 1918	17 Mar 1919	Sold 28 Nov 1931; BU Rees, Llanelli.
Trusty	F.A2	H.56	Jun 1917	White	11 Apr 1918	6 Nov 1918	9 May 1919	to Ward, 25 Sep 1936; BU Inverkeithing.

=== Thornycroft S class ===
General characteristics Thornycroft S class
- Displacement: 1,087 tons (normal); 1,240 tons (full load)
- Length: 266 ft 9 in (81.3 m) (pp); 272 ft 9 in (83.1 m) (wl); 275 ft 9 in (84.0 m) (oa)
- Beam: 27 ft 4 in (8.3 m)
- Draught: 14 ft 2 in (4.3 m) (deep)
- Installed power: 29,000 shp (21,625 kW)
- Notes: Other characteristics as Admiralty S class

John I. Thornycroft & Company Limited, based at Woolston, Southampton, was a shipbuilding firm specializing in construction of destroyers and other fast vessels. These five vessels were built to Thornycroft's own design, based on a modified version of their R-class destroyer Rosalind. Thornycrofts emphasized improved performance via larger, more powerful machinery. In order to incorporate larger boilers, the beam was increased by 8 inches (203 mm) (with a metacentric height 2.85 feet (0.87 m).) The increased stability allowed a higher mounting for the forward gun, which was placed on a superstructure that acted as a breakwater. They had a designed power of 29,000 shp (22,000 kW); on trials, Tobago made 38.31 knots (70.95 km/h; 44.09 mph) with 34.245 shp (25.536 kW), on a displacement of 979 tons. The first two were ordered in April 1917 and the last three in June 1917. The 18-inch torpedoes under the bridge were fixed athwartship, rather than being rotating mounts as was the case in the Admiralty S-class.

Thornycroft S-class
Name	Pendant		Ordered	Builder	Laid down	Launched	Completed	Fate
Name	WWI	>1922	Ordered	Builder	Laid down	Launched	Completed	Fate
Speedy	G.36	–	7 Apr 1917	Thornycroft	May 1917	1 Jun 1918	14 Aug 1918	Sunk in collision, 24 Sep 1922.
Tobago	G.61	–	7 Apr 1917	Thornycroft	May 1917	15 Jul 1918	2 Oct 1918	Mined 12 Nov 1920; BU 1922
Torbay	F.35	H.24	Jun 1917	Thornycroft	Nov 1917	6 Mar 1919	17 Jul 1919	to RCN, Mar 1928 as Champlain. BU 1937.
Toreador	F.6A	H.55	Jun 1917	Thornycroft	Nov 1917	7 Dec 1918	Apr 1919	to RCN, Mar 1928 as Vancouver. BU 1937.
Tourmaline	D.83	D.10	Jun 1917	Thornycroft	Jan 1918	12 Apr 1919	Dec 1919	Sold 28 Nov 1931, BU Ward, Grays.

=== Yarrow S class ===
General characteristics Yarrow S class
- Displacement: 932 tons (normal); 1,060 tons (full load)
- Length: 266 ft 9 in (81.3 m) (pp); 273 ft 6 in (83.4 m) (oa)
- Beam: 25 ft 7.5 in (7.8 m)
- Draught: 12 ft 6 in (3.8 m) (deep)
- Installed power: 23,000 shp (17,151 kW)
- Notes: Other characteristics as Admiralty S class

Yarrow & Company, Limited, based at Scotstoun in the west of Glasgow, were another firm specializing in construction of destroyers and similar vessels. These seven vessels were built to Yarrow's own design, based on a modified version of Ulleswater (Yarrow R class). By reducing the weights of both hull and machinery, Yarrows were able to produce much faster vessels. In order to save weight, they had direct-dive Brown-Curtis turbines rated at only 23,000 shp (17,000 kW); however on trials Tyrian made 39.72 knots (73.56 km/h; 45.71 mph) with 31,364 shp (23,388 kW) on 786 tons displacement.

Initially five were to be ordered in April 1917, however two more (Torch and Tomahawk) were added, replacing previous orders for two W-class destroyers (Wayfarer and Woodpecker). This change was made at the request of Sir Alfred Yarrow to streamline production; otherwise, his yard would have had three different designs under construction at the same time.

Yarrow S-class
Name	Pennant		Builder	Laid down	Launched	Completed	Fate
Name	WWI	>1922	Builder	Laid down	Launched	Completed	Fate
Torch (ex-Wayfarer)	G.33	D.15	Yarrow	Apr 1917	16 Mar 1918	11 May 1918	Sold 19 Nov 1929, BU J. J. King, Troon.
Tomahawk (ex-Woodpecker)	G.34	D.79	Yarrow	Apr 1917	11 May 1918	8 Jul 1918	BU J. J. King, Troon.
Tryphon	G.42	–	Yarrow	Apr 1917	22 Jun 1918	Sep 1918	Stranded, 4 May 1919; Sold 27 Sep 1920, BU.
Tumult	G.58	D.18	Yarrow	Jun 1917	17 Sep 1918	Dec 1918	Sold 3 Oct 1928; BU Alloa, Charlestown.
Turquoise	G.22	H.02	Yarrow	Jun 1917	9 Nov 1918	Mar 1919	Sold Jan 1932; BU Alloa, Charlestown.
Tuscan	F.A5	D.80	Yarrow	Jun 1917	1 Mar 1919	24 Jun 1919	Sold 25 Aug 1932; BU Metal Ind., Charlestown.
Tyrian	D.84	H.01	Yarrow	Jun 1917	2 Jul 1919	23 Dec 1919	Sold Feb 1930; BU Metal Ind., Charlestown.

== Operational service ==
These vessels saw comparatively little action, most being completed in the closing stages or after the end of the First World War, and scrapped before the start of Second World War.

=== First World War ===
The first S-class destroyer to be completed, Simoom, joined the Grand Fleet in April 1918. The Commodore(F) commanding the Grand Fleet destroyer flotillas did not approve of the design, largely because of the 18-inch torpedoes, which were considered useless. The C-in-C, Admiral David Beatty, concurred; he had only consented to the design on the understanding that they would be employed at Harwich or Dover, while the Grand Fleet got W-class ships with six 21-inch torpedo tubes. However, despite his wishes, most of them were allocated to the Grand Fleet on completion. Senator and Sikh were with the Dover Patrol from June–August 1918, before going to the Mediterranean, where Shark, Tilbury and Tribune followed. At the time of the armistice in November 1918, there were 27 vessels were in commission, allocated as follows

- 5th Destroyer Flotilla (Mudros): Senator, Sikh, Shark, Tilbury, Tribune.
- 10th Destroyer Flotilla (Harwich Force): Swallow.
- 12th Destroyer Flotilla (Grand Fleet): Scimitar, Scotsman, Scout, Scythe, Seabear, Sepoy, Simoom, Sirdar, Speedy, Tomahawk, Torch, Trinidad, Tryphon.
- 14th Destroyer Flotilla (Grand Fleet): Sabre, Seafire, Seraph, Somme, Sparrowhawk, Splendid, Tactician, Tobago (to join: Searcher, Sportive, Tara, Trojan, Tumult).

=== Post-war service, 1919–1932 ===
The Royal Navy was re-organized in March and April 1919 into three principal fleets: the Atlantic Fleet (comprising the newest battleships and battlecruisers, with supporting cruisers and destroyers in home waters), the Home Fleet (which comprised slightly less modern ships at lower complement; it was renamed the Reserve Fleet on 1 November 1919) and the Mediterranean Fleet; In addition, there were various overseas squadrons for policing the Empire (Africa Station, East Indies Station, China Station and North America and West Indies Station), the Dominion Naval Forces, and commands based at the principal naval bases in the United Kingdom (i.e. Portsmouth, Plymouth, Chatham (The Nore) and Rosyth), which included large numbers of decommissioned vessels held in reserve with skeleton crews. Under this scheme, the destroyer flotillas were completely re-organized, with a standard composition of two leaders and 16 destroyers. The 1st, 2nd and 3rd flotillas (V/W-class destroyers), were in the Atlantic Fleet; The Home Fleet had two flotillas (4th and 5th) of R-class vessels; The 6th Flotilla, comprising S-class destroyers, was sent to the Mediterranean Fleet, while the 7th Flotilla, also of S-class destroyers, formed a ready reserve at Rosyth.

Organization, July 1919:

- 6th Destroyer Flotilla (Mediterranean Fleet, all in full commission): Senator, Seraph, Shark, Sikh, Spear, Speedy, Sportive, Steadfast, Swallow, Tilbury, Tobago, Tomahawk, Torch, Tribune, Tryphon, Tumult.
- 7th Destroyer Flotilla (Rosyth reserve): in full commission: Scout, Seabear, Seafire, Somme, Sparrowhawk; in reserve: Sabre, Scimitar, Scotsman, Scythe, Searcher, Sepoy, Serapis, Simoom, Sirdar, Splendid, Trinidad.
- Attached to other flotillas (all in full commission): Tactician, Trojan (both with 3rd DF, Atlantic Fleet); Sterling (temporarily with 4th D.F., Home Fleet).
- other duties: Seawolf (tender to Defiance, Devonport), Strenuous (tender to Vernon, Portsmouth), Truant (tender to Victory, Portsmouth).
- In Reserve: at the Nore: Stalwart, Success, Tara, Tasmania, Tattoo, Tenedos, Tintagel; at Portsmouth: Saladin, Stronghold, Swordsman, Torbay, Toreador, Trusty, Turquoise, Tuscan; at Plymouth: Sardonyx, Serene, Sesame, Spindrift.
- building: Shamrock, Shikari, Stonehenge, Stormcloud, Sturdy, Thanet, Thracian, Tourmaline, Turbulent, Tyrian.

==== Russian Civil War ====
A destroyer division consisting of four of these ships, Seafire, Scotsman, Scout and Seabear (under Commander A. B. Cunningham in Seafire), was part of Admiral Walter Cowan's squadron March–May 1919 during the British campaign in the Baltic (1918–19). Among other duties, they were involved in the Latvian War of Independence, foiling an attempted coup by German troops in the port of Libau.

During 1919–20 the S-class destroyers in the Mediterranean participated in the British intervention in southern Russia, giving military aid to the White Russian forces under Generals Denikin and Wrangel. In particular, Tomahawk and Tribune helped defend the Perekop line in January 1920; Sportive look part in the evacuation of White Troops from Odessa in February 1920; Steadfast, Sikh and Seraph were involved in the evacuation of Novorossik in March 1920; and Seraph and Shamrock in the final evacuation from the Crimea in November 1920, while Tourmaline and Tobago patrolled off Novorossisk and Tuapse to intercept any Soviet attempts to interfere (Tobago hit a mine during these operations, and was consequently scrapped).

==== Irish Civil War ====
After the Irish Free State came into being on 6 December 1922, the Royal Navy retained the right to base ships at three Treaty Ports: Berehaven, Queenstown/Cobh and Lough Swilly. In order to maintain a naval presence in these ports, Seawolf, Scythe and Sesame were commissioned at reduced complement as independent commands in Irish waters during the 1920s. Scythe had a minor involvement in the Irish Civil War when machine gun fire was directed at her while moored at Spike Island (Queenstown harbour) on 21 March 1924. The S class serving in Irish waters had all been replaced with more modern vessels by 1931.

==== Mediterranean, Atlantic Fleet and China ====
In 1921 British destroyer flotillas were re-organized into formations consisting of one leader plus eight destroyers. The S-class destroyers, which formed the Mediterranean Fleet's destroyer force at that time, became the 7th and 8th Flotillas.

Organization, January 1923:

- 7th Destroyer Flotilla (Mediterranean Fleet): leader Stuart; Shark, Sikh, Sepoy, Trinidad, Tribune, Spear, Sparrowhawk, Senator.
- 8th Destroyer Flotilla (Mediterranean Fleet): leader Montrose; Sidar, Sportive, Splendid, Tourmaline, Seraph, Serapis, Somme, Swallow.
- Queenstown Command: Seawolf, Tilbury.
- Royal Australian Navy: Tasmania, Stalwart; in reserve: Success, Swordsman, Tattoo.
- other duties: Tara (tender to Vernon, Devonport), Truant (tender to Victory, Portsmouth).
- In Reserve: at The Nore: Thracian, Shamrock, Steadfast, Sabre, Tenedos, Thanet, Turbulent, Tintagel; at Portsmouth: Saladin, Turquoise, Tyrian, Stronghold, Sturdy, Trojan, Trusty, Torbay, Toreador; at Plymouth: Sterling, Stormcloud, Strenuous, Scimitar, Scotsman, Scout, Simoom, Scythe, Seabear, Seafire, Searcher, Serene, Sesame, Spindrift, Sardonyx, Tactician; at Malta: Tomahawk, Torch, Tumult, Tuscan.
- building: Shikari.

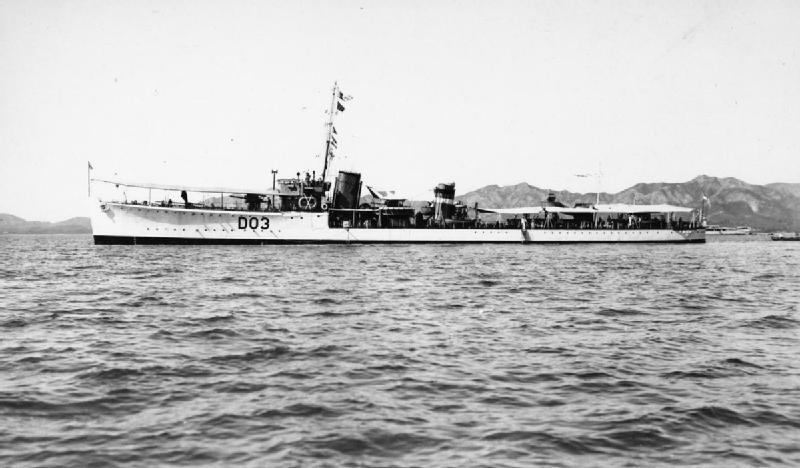
HMS Sepoy serving with the 8th Destroyer Flotilla on the China Station, c. 1930

The 7th Flotilla returned to Home Waters to become part of the Atlantic Fleet in July 1923; it was re-designed as the 9th Flotilla in 1925 before being reduced to reserve by February 1926. The 8th Flotilla followed in October 1923, remaining in commission (with 40% complements) as part of the Atlantic Fleet until 1927. The flotilla was then deployed to the China Station during the period of tension precipitated by the threat to British concessions at Shanghai (see Shanghai Defence Force).

Organization, October 1930:

- 8th Destroyer Flotilla (China Station): leader Bruce; Sepoy, Seraph, Sirdar, Somme, Serapis, Sterling, Stormcloud, Thracian,
- overseas guard ships: at Gibraltar: Splendid, Tourmaline; in Irish Treaty Ports: Seawolf, Scythe.
- Royal Canadian Navy: Champlain, Vancouver.
- other duties: Shikari (Fleet target service), Tara (tender to Vernon, Devonport),Truant (tender to Victory, Portsmouth), Sesame (attached to Home Fleet Aircraft Carriers)
- In Reserve: at Plymouth: Steadfast, Thanet, Tintagel; at The Nore: Trinidad; at Portsmouth: Tribune, Tilbury, Shamrock; at Rosyth: Tuscan, Senator, Shark, Sparrowhawk, Swallow, Sportive, Strenuous, Scimitar, Scotsman, Simoom, Seabear, Seafire, Searcher, Serene, Spindrift, Sardonyx, Tactician, Sabre, Tenedos, Turbulent, Saladin, Turquoise, Stronghold, Sturdy, Trojan, Trusty, Scout; in Australia: Tasmania, Success, Swordsman, Stalwart, Tattoo.

The S-class destroyers of the 8th Flotilla remained in China until 1931, when they were replaced by V/W-class ships, and came home to pay off. By 1933 only five remained active in British service: Shamrock and Searcher as Gibraltar guard ships, Shikari in the fleet target service, and Stronghold and Sardonyx as tenders at Portsmouth.

=== Service in Dominion navies ===
Australia
Five of the Admiralty S class, Stalwart, Success, Swordsman, Tasmania and Tattoo, along with the leader Anzac, were presented to the Royal Australian Navy in June 1919. The ships were all commissioned on 27 January 1920 in U.K., and sailed for Australia the following month, arriving in Sydney on 29 April 1920. They spent much of their careers in reserve or operating close to Sydney; Stalwart visited New Guinea in June–July 1924. and Tattoo made a trip to New Guinea and the Solomon Islands in September 1932. All were sold for scrapping on 4 June 1937 and were broken up at Penguin Ltd., of Balmain; the hulks of Swordsman and Stalwart were scuttled off Sydney in 1939.

Canada

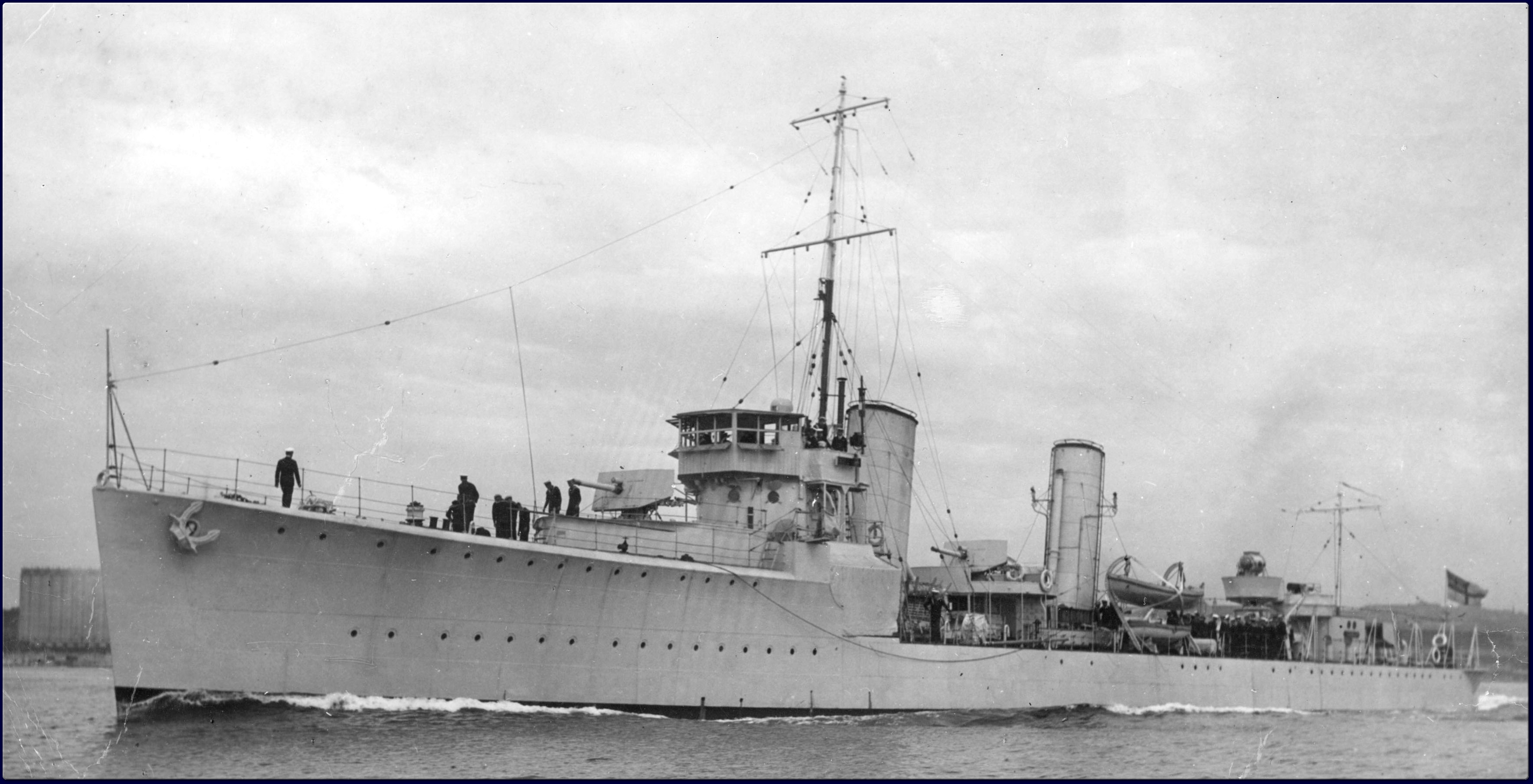
Champlain (ex-Torbay), c.1932, showing the raised gun platform forward, characteristic of the Thornycroft S class

Two of the Thornycroft S class, Torbay and Toreador, were loaned to the Royal Canadian Navy in 1927 and commissioned on 1 March 1928. They were renamed Champlain and Vancouver respectively. Champlain served on the east coast, Vancouver on the west, both mostly being engaged in sea training. They paid off on 25 November 1936 and were scrapped in 1937 in Canada.

=== Reserve and disposals, 1926–1938 ===
Of 67 vessels completed, four were lost or scrapped as a result of damage on active service during 1919–22; five (Fairfield's Spear and Sikh, and the Yarrow Specials Tomahawk, Tumult and Torch) were scrapped in the late 1920s.

On 31 December 1930 the London Naval Treaty came into force, limiting RN destroyers to a total of 150,000 tons by 31 December 1936. As new construction joined the fleet, the S class, being less capable than the contemporary V/W-class ships (which had only slightly higher displacement), were sold for scrap: 13 in 1931, 9 in 1932, 6 in 1934 and 10 in 1935. The terms of the London treaty expired at the end of 1936, nevertheless 8 more were scrapped in 1937 (all but one being RCN/RAN vessels) and 1 in 1938.

Eleven vessels survived to see service during the Second World War, six in European waters, five in the Far East.

=== Second World War service, European waters ===
Following the outbreak of war both Shikari (the disarmed remote control vessel for target ships) and Sabre (which had been disarmed as an aircraft bombing target ship) were refitted for active service as escort vessels. Sturdy, which had been refitted as a minelayer, sailed for Hong Kong in 1939 but was retained in the Mediterranean as attendant destroyer to the aircraft carrier Argus, which operated as a training carrier based at Toulon between November 1939 and the French collapse in June 1940, after which she returned to home waters. Sabre was damaged by an accident early in the war and was under repair until spring 1940. (Note: Sources differ on the precise nature of the damage to Sabre: either she ran aground off the Scottish coast in February 1940 and was under repair until April 1940; or she was in collision with the armed merchant cruiser Jervis Bay at Rosyth on 13 October 1939 and was under repair until 6 May 1940.) At the time of the Dunkirk evacuation in May 1940, Sabre, Scimitar and Shikari were with the 16th Destroyer Flotilla at Harwich and Saladin with the 11th Destroyer Flotilla at Devonport; all participated in the evacuation, carrying over 12,000 troops between them. Saladin was severely damaged by air attack on 28 May 1940, while Shikari was the last ship to leave Dunkirk, (at 0340 hrs, 4 June 1940), with enemy troops only 3 miles (4.8 km) away.

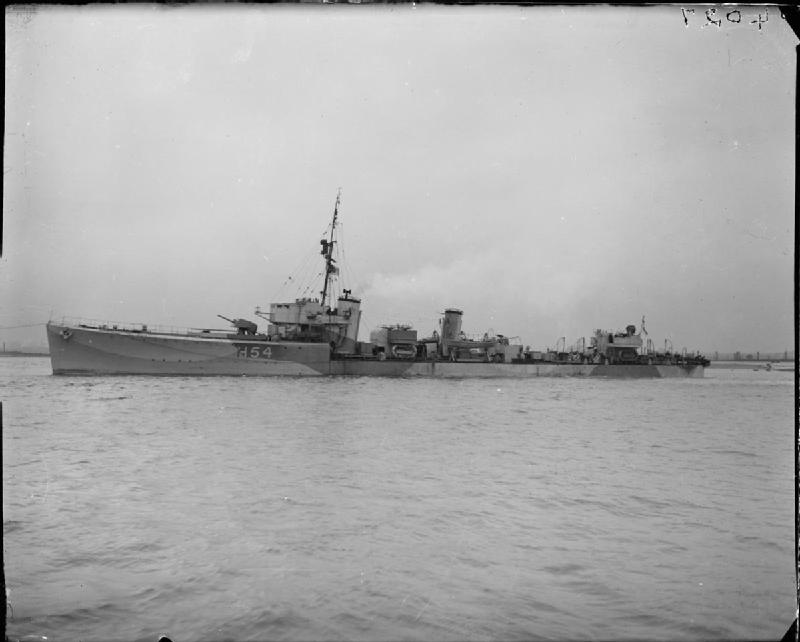
HMS Saladin underway serving as an escort vessel during the Second World War

By June 1940 Sabre, Shikari, Sturdy, Scimitar, Saladin and Sardonyx (together with the last R-class destroyer, Skate) had formed the 22nd Destroyer Flotilla at Portsmouth; they remained there in readiness to repel a German invasion, until the autumn, when they started being allocated as escorts to Atlantic convoys. Sturdy was lost on 30 October 40 while on such duty. In 1941–42 they were refitted as escort vessels: the forward 4-inch gun was retained, but the other guns and torpedo tubes were landed; in their place, two quadruple 0.5-inch anti-aircraft (AA) guns were mounted between the funnels; a single a 12-pounder AA gun replaced the forward bank of tubes, and eight depth charge throwers plus two stern racks were added (40–70 depth charges were carried). Later four single 20 mm AA replaced the 0.5-inch machine guns, and the number of depth charge throwers was reduced to four. Type 291 radar was added. Deep load displacement rose to 1385–1400 tons; Their over-loading caused them to roll terribly in rough North Atlantic weather. By January 1941 they were all allocated to Atlantic convoy escort groups based at Derry, and later the 21st Escort Group based in Iceland, 1942–44. Their sole success against German U-boats was on 29 June 1941 when Scimitar was escorting Convoy HX 133 and participated in the destruction of U.651 south of Iceland. As more modern ships reached the fleet in numbers, they transferred to coastal convoy work in Home Waters in late 1943-mid 1944. Scimitar and Saladin were involved in the Exercise Tiger debacle in April 1944. Most of them were paid off as training ships or to reserve in late 1944, although Sabre was still active as a coastal escort on VE Day.

=== Second World War service, Far East ===
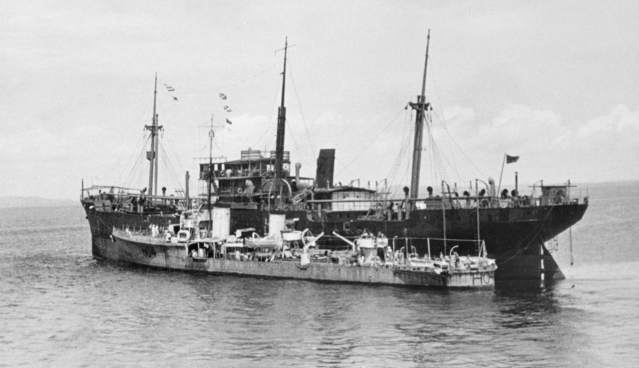
Tenedos, 3 February 1942, alongside a damaged merchantman in the Bangka Strait. Note her reconfigured stern, which had been altered for minelaying.

Thanet, Thracian, Scout, Tenedos and Stronghold were refitted for service in the Far East as local defense destroyers (Sturdy, Scimitar and Sardonyx were intended to join them in 1939–40, thereby creating a full flotilla). Scout, Tenedos and Stronghold were refitted as minelayers, their torpedo tubes and aft guns were replaced by stowage for 40 mines. Tenedos and Stronghold laid defensive minefields around Singapore and Malaya, 1939–41.

At the outbreak of war with Japan, on 7 December 1941, Tenedos and Stronghold were at Singapore, while Thanet, Thracian and Scout were at Hong Kong. Scout and Thanet were ordered to Singapore on 8 December 1941, while Thracian remained to take part in the defense of Hong Kong, and was scuttled on 19 December 1941.

Tenedos formed part of Force Z during the ill-fated sortie 8–10 December 1941 in which Prince of Wales and Repulse were sunk. Thanet and Stronghold were sunk during the fall of the Malay Barrier, January–March 1942, while Scout and Tenedos were assigned to the ABDA Western Striking Force, and escaped to Ceylon in March 1942 following the Japanese invasion of Java. Tenedos was later sunk by Japanese carrier aircraft at Colombo, 5 April 1942, while Scout remained in service in the Indian Ocean until December 1943; her refit at Bombay was abandoned as uneconomic and she was laid up at Trincomalee in June 1944 as an accommodation hulk; she was returned to UK in December 1945 and scrapped.

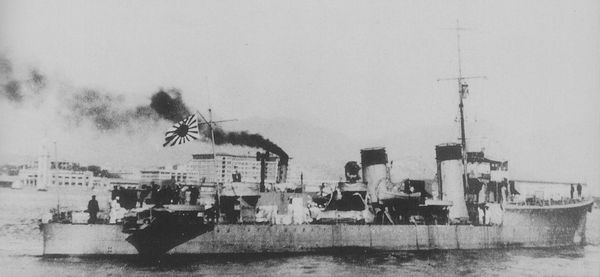
Thracian in Japanese service as IJN Patrol Boat No. 101 in 1942

Thracian was salved by the Japanese and used as Patrol Vessel No.101 (第101号哨戒艇) (refloated 10 July 1942, in service 25 November 1942); she was assigned to the Yokosuka Naval District as a coastal escort in Japanese waters for most of 1943, before becoming a radar training vessel at Yokosuka in March 1944; she was returned to RN control at Hong Kong in October 1945 and scrapped locally in February 1946.

=== Losses in World War I ===
- Tryphon was stranded on rocks off Mudros in the Aegean on 4 May 1919, laying on her port side for three weeks until salved by Melita in June 1919; she was towed to Malta and declared a total loss; her wreck was sold on 27 September 1920 to Agius Bros of Malta, and scrapped.
- Stonehenge, newly arrived in the Mediterranean from the Atlantic, was wrecked near Smyrna on 6 November 1920.
- Tobago struck a mine on 12 November 1920 about 10 miles (16 km) northeast of Trebizond in the Black Sea. She sustained serious damage, with a 26-by-16-foot (7.9 m × 4.9 m) hole on the port side of her engine room; she was towed by the light cruiser Calypso from Trebizond to Istanbul; after temporary repairs, she was towed to Malta by the battleship Centurion, but was found to be beyond economic repair; she was subsequently sold on 9 February 1922 for scrapping at Malta.
- Speedy was sunk in collision with a tug in the Sea of Marmara on 24 September 1922, during the Chanak Crisis (10 killed).

=== Losses during World War II ===
- Sturdy was wrecked on the rocks at Sandaig on the west coast of Tiree (56°29′N 6°59′W) during a storm on 30 October 1940, while escorting convoy SC.8 (5 lives lost).
- Thracian was damaged by air attack during the battle of Hong Kong and was scuttled by deliberate grounding on Round Island in Repulse Bay (22°13′N 114°11′E) on 16 December 1941. Her crew subsequently took part in the land fighting (17 killed or died of wounds).
- Thanet was sunk in action by gunfire of Japanese cruiser Sendai and destroyers Shirayuki, Yūgiri, Fubuki, Asagiri, Amagiri, and Hatsuyuki during the night action off Endau, Malaya (2°40′N 103°42′E) at 0418, 27 January 1942 (38 killed or executed by the Japanese).
- Stronghold was intercepted after the Japanese invasion of Java and sunk by the Japanese cruiser Maya and destroyers Arashi and Nowaki, at 1858 on 2 March 1942, c. 300 miles due south of Tulungagung, Java (12°20′S 112°00′E). Stronghold was carrying evacuees from Tjilatjap, Java, to Australia when she was sunk. About fifty survivors were picked up by the (captured) small Dutch merchant ship Bintoehan, and later transferred to Maya. (83 killed, including commanding officer Lt.Cdr. Giles Robert Pretor-Pinney.)
- Tenedos was sunk during the Japanese carrier air raid on Colombo, Ceylon on 5 April 1942. She was damaged by two near-miss bombs (one astern, the other abreast her fore-funnel), then hit by two bombs (33 killed). The wreck was removed in 1944.

== Opinion ==
Admiral Cunningham, the Royal Navy's most famous Admiral of the Second World War, had a high opinion of this class:

In 1918–19, when serving in Seafire, I had been much impressed by the ships of that same 'S' class of which sixty-nine had been ordered in 1917. They appeared to possess most of the qualities required by torpedo craft – a displacement of about 1,000 tons; an armament of three 4-inch guns and two double torpedo tubes; a speed of about 33 knots; good endurance; good seaworthiness in bad weather; fair habitability; and an inconspicuous silhouette. They were also moderately cheap and rapidly built, some, I believe, having been completed in six months. More than fifty of these useful craft had remained at the end of the First World War, but later had been relegated to the reserve, where, through false economy, the men and money were not available for their upkeep and maintenance. They had gradually rusted away and been disposed of as scrap metal. No more than ten remained in service in 1939.

== Notes ==
Notes to tables of ships

== Bibliography ==
- Brown, D.K. (1999). The Grand Fleet: Warship Design and Development 1906–1922. London, U.K.: Chatham Publishing.
- Bryce, Jim (2017). "Ships Pennant Numbers".
- Colledge, J. J.; Warlow, Ben (2006) [1969]. Ships of the Royal Navy: The Complete Record of All Fighting Ships of the Royal Navy from the 15th Century to the Present (3rd Rev ed.). London: Chatham Publishing. ISBN 978-1-86176-281-8. OCLC 67375475.
- Dittmar, F.J. & Colledge, J.J. (1972). British Warships 1914–1919. Shepperton, UK: Ian Allan. ISBN 0-7110-0380-7.
- Cunningham of Hyndhope (1951). A Sailor's Odyssey: the Autobiography of Admiral of the Fleet, Viscount Cunningham of Hyndhope. London: Hutchinson & Co.
- Friedman, Norman (2009). British Destroyers: From Earliest Days to the Second World War. Barnsley, UK: Seaforth Publishing. ISBN 978-1-84832-049-9.
- Gardiner, Robert & Gray, Randal, eds. (1985). Conway's All The World's Fighting Ships 1906–1921. London: Conway Maritime Press. ISBN 0-85177-245-5.
- Gillett, Ross (1977). Warships for Australia. Illustrations Colin Graham. Rigby Limited. ISBN 0-7270-0472-7.
- Halpern, Paul G., ed. (2011). The Mediterranean Fleet, 1919–1929. London: Naval Records Society. ISBN 978-1-4094-2756-8.
- Lenton, H. T. (1998). British and Empire Warships of the Second World War. London: Greenhill Books. ISBN 1-85367-277-7.
- March, Edgar J. (1966). British Destroyers: A History of Development, 1892–1953; Drawn by Admiralty Permission From Official Records & Returns, Ships' Covers & Building Plans. London: Seeley Service. OCLC 164893555.
- Parkes, Surgeon-Lieut. Oscar & Prendergast, Maurice, eds. (1919). Jane's Fighting Ships 1919. London: Sampson, Low, Marston & Co.
- Parkes, Dr. Oscar & McMurtrie, Francis, eds. (1931). Jane's Fighting Ships 1931. London: Sampson, Low, Marston & Co.
- Smith, Gordon (2017). "Royal Navy warship histories of World War 2". naval-history.net.
- Watson, Graham (2017). "Royal Navy Organization and Ship Deployment, Inter-War Years 1919–39". naval-history.org.
- Whitley, M.J. (2000). Destroyers of World War Two: An International Encyclopedia. London: Cassell & Co. ISBN 1-85409-521-8.
