= HMS Tara (1918) =

S class destroyerI

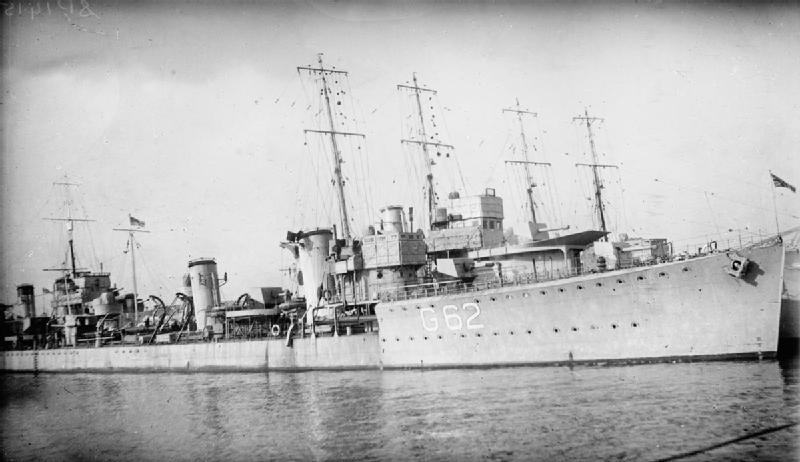
- HMS Tara undertaking trials in 1919

History

United Kingdom
- Name: HMS Tara
- Ordered: June 1917
- Builder: Beardmore, Dalmuir
- Yard number: 590
- Laid down: 21 November 1917
- Launched: 12 October 1918
- Completed: 9 December 1918
- Out of service: 17 December 1931
- Fate: Sold to be broken up

General characteristics
- Class & type: S-class destroyer
- Displacement: 1,075 long tons (1,092 t) normal; 1,220 long tons (1,240 t) deep load
- Length: 265 ft (80.8 m) p.p.
- Beam: 26 ft 8 in (8.13 m)
- Draught: 9 ft 10 in (3.00 m) mean
- Propulsion: 3 Yarrow boilers; 2 geared Brown-Curtis steam turbines, 27,000 shp
- Speed: 36 knots (41.4 mph; 66.7 km/h)
- Range: 2,750 nmi (5,090 km) at 15 kn (28 km/h)
- Complement: 90
- Armament: 3 × QF 4-inch (101.6 mm) Mark IV guns, mounting P Mk. IX; 1 × single 2-pounder (40-mm) "pom-pom" Mk. II anti-aircraft gun; 4 × 21 in (533 mm) torpedo tubes (2×2)

HMS Tara was an S-class destroyer, which served with the Royal Navy. Launched on 7 August 1918, the vessel entered service at the closing of the First World War. The ship joined the Fourteenth Destroyer Flotilla of the Grand Fleet but was placed in Reserve at Nore in 1919. Tara deteriorated over the following years and was sold to be broken up on 17 December 1931 after the signing of the London Naval Treaty that limited the amount of destroyer tonnage the Navy could retain.

== Design and development ==
Tara was one of thirty-three Admiralty S class destroyers ordered by the British Admiralty in June 1917 as part of the Twelfth War Construction Programme. The design was a development of the R class introduced as a cheaper and faster alternative to the V and W class. Differences with the R class were minor, such as having the searchlight moved aft.

Tara had an overall length of 276 ft (84 m) and a length of 265 ft (81 m) between perpendiculars. Beam was 26 ft 8 in (8.13 m) and draught 9 ft 10 in (3.00 m). Displacement was 1,075 long tons (1,092 t) normal and 1,220 long tons (1,240 t) deep load. Three Yarrow boilers fed steam to two sets of Brown-Curtis geared steam turbines rated at 27,000 shaft horsepower (20,000 kW) and driving two shafts, giving a design speed of 36 knots (67 km/h; 41 mph) at normal loading and 32.5 knots (60.2 km/h; 37.4 mph) at deep load. Two funnels were fitted. The ship carried 301 long tons (306 t) of fuel oil, which gave a design range of 2,750 nautical miles (5,090 km; 3,160 mi) at 15 knots (28 km/h; 17 mph).

Armament consisted of three QF 4-inch (102 mm) Mk IV guns on the ship's centreline. One was mounted raised on the forecastle, one between the funnels on a raised platform and one aft. The ship also mounted a single 40-millimetre (1.6 in) 2-pounder pom-pom anti-aircraft gun for air defence. Four 21-inch (533 mm) torpedo tubes were fitted in two twin rotating mounts aft. The ship also carried two 18-inch (457 mm) torpedo tubes on single rotating mounts mounted under the bridge, one to port and the other starboard. They were intended to be used during night attacks and controlled directly by the commanding officer using toggle ropes. The ship had a complement of 90 officers and ratings.

== Construction and career ==
Laid down on 21 November 1917 by William Beardmore and Company in Dalmuir with the yard number 590, Tara was launched on 12 October 1918 and completed on 9 December 1918. The vessel was the first and only of the name. The yard built the destroyers Tactician and Tasmania at the same time.Tara joined the Fourteenth Destroyer Flotilla of the Grand Fleet.

With the First World War closing, the destroyer saw no action before the Armistice. At the end of the war, the ship remained with the Grand Fleet until it was dissolved. As the navy no longer required such a large active fleet of ships, Tara was transferred to join sixty-three other destroyers in reserve at Nore. Tara was a tender to HMS Vernon, the torpedo school at Portsmouth in November 1924. On 22 April 1930, the United Kingdom signed the London Naval Treaty, which limited total destroyer tonnage in the Navy. Having remained on reserve for more than a decade, Tara was found to be in poor condition and was one of those chosen to be retired. In July 1931, Tara was replaced as tender to the Torpedo School by sister ship Stronghold, with Tara's crew transferring to Stronghold. On 17 December 1931, the destroyer was sold to Rees of Llanelly, and broken up.

== Pennant number ==
Pennant number
Pennant number	Date
G62	1918
H92	1918
D77	Unknown
D93	Unknown
