= Claud Barry =

Royal Navy officer and Naval Secretary

Admiral Sir Claud Barry KBE CB DSO
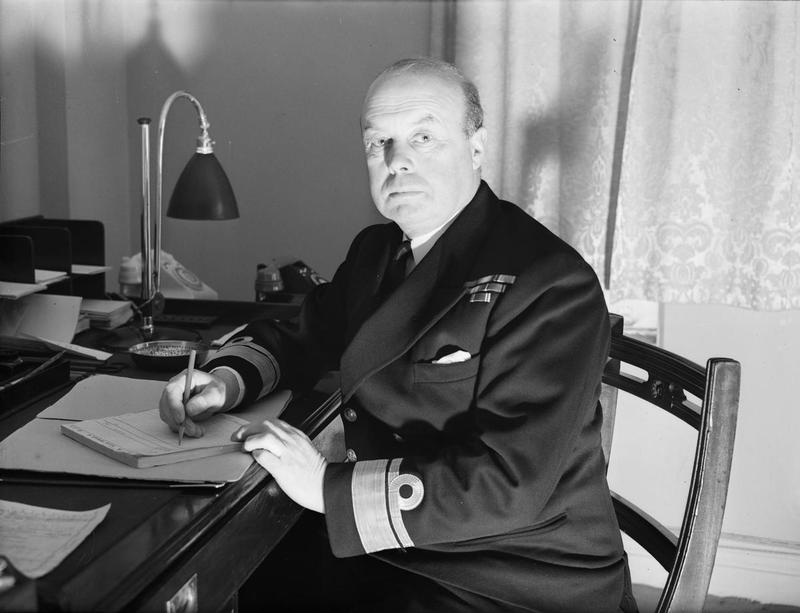
- Barry at his desk in 1943
- Born: 17 July 1891
- Died: 27 December 1951 (aged 60); Beaulieu, Hampshire
- Military career
- Allegiance: United Kingdom
- Branch: Royal Navy
- Service years: 1904–1951
- Rank: Admiral
- Commands: HMS C20; HMS C21; HMS D4; HMS R12; HMS K22; HMS K26; HMS Queen Elizabeth
- Conflicts: World War I World War II
- Awards: Knight Commander of the Order of the British Empire; Companion of the Order of the Bath; Distinguished Service Order

Admiral Sir Claud Barrington Barry KBE CB DSO (17 July 1891 – 27 December 1951) was a Royal Navy officer who became Naval Secretary.

== Naval service ==
Educated at Cordwalles School and at the Royal Naval College, Osborne, and the Royal Naval College, Dartmouth, Barry joined the Royal Navy in 1904 and served in World War I in the Submarine Service commanding various submarines including HMS C20, HMS C21, HMS D6 and HMS R12. After the War he served with the Royal Australian Navy and was then given command of HMS K22 followed by HMS K26 before being appointed Chief of Staff to the Admiral, Submarines in 1934.

He also served in World War II as Naval Assistant to the Second Sea Lord and as Captain of the battleship HMS Queen Elizabeth before becoming Rear-Admiral, Submarines in 1942. After the War he became Naval Secretary and then Director of Dockyards from 1946 to 1951.

Military offices
Preceded by Sir Max Horton	Rear-Admiral Submarines; 1942–1944	Succeeded by George Creasy
Preceded by Cecil Harcourt	Naval Secretary; 1945–1946	Succeeded by Maurice Mansergh
