= I-201 =

I-201 may refer to:

- I-201 class submarine, a class of submarines of the Imperial Japanese Navy during World War II
- Japanese submarine I-201, a World War II diesel-powered submarine
- Interstate H-201, interstate highway in Hawaii
