= Japanese submarine I-203 =

Imperial Japanese Navy submarine laid down in 1944

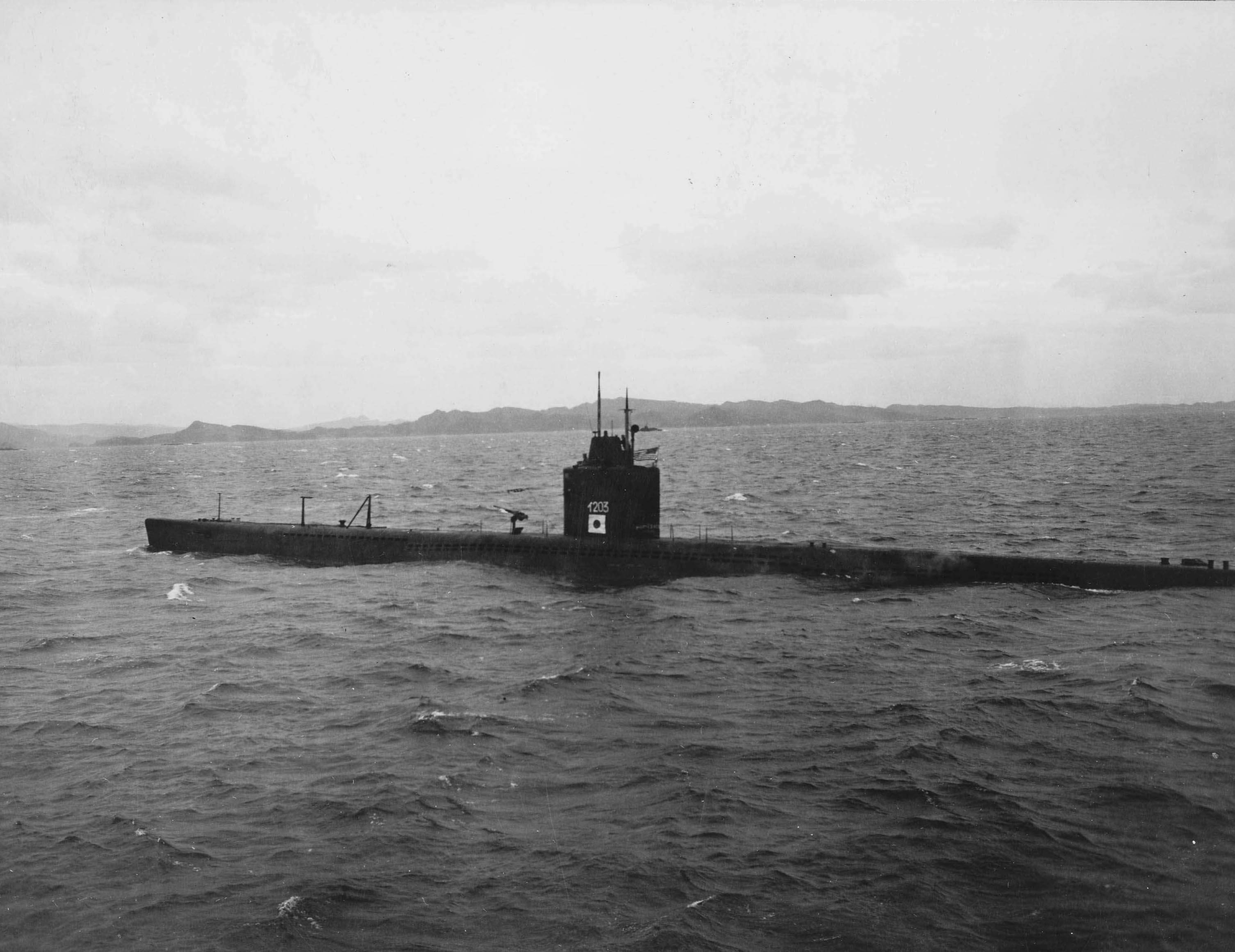
- I-203 in 17 December 1945

History

Empire of Japan
- Name: I-203
- Builder: Kure Naval Arsenal, Kure, Japan
- Laid down: 1 June 1944
- Launched: 20 October 1944
- Completed: 29 May 1945
- Commissioned: 29 May 1945
- Stricken: 30 November 1945
- Fate: Surrendered 2 September 1945; Sunk as target 21 May 1946

General characteristics
- Class & type: I-201-class submarine
- Displacement: 1,312 tonnes (1,291 long tons) surfaced; 1,473 tonnes (1,450 long tons) submerged
- Length: 79 m (259 ft 2 in)
- Beam: 5.8 m (19 ft 0 in)
- Draft: 5.4 m (17 ft 9 in)
- Installed power: 2,750 bhp (2,050 kW) (diesels); 5,000 hp (3,700 kW) (electric motors)
- Propulsion: Diesel-electric; 2 × diesel engines; 2 × electric motors
- Speed: 15.8 knots (29.3 km/h; 18.2 mph) surfaced; 19 knots (35 km/h; 22 mph) submerged
- Range: 5,800 nmi (10,700 km; 6,700 mi) at 14 knots (26 km/h; 16 mph) surfaced; 135 nmi (250 km; 155 mi) at 3 knots (5.6 km/h; 3.5 mph) submerged
- Test depth: 110 m (360 ft)
- Complement: 31
- Armament: 4 × bow 533 mm (21 in) torpedo tubes; 2 × single Type 96 25 mm (0.98 in) anti-aircraft guns

The Japanese submarine I-203 was an I-201-class high-speed submarine built for the Imperial Japanese Navy during World War II. She was commissioned in May 1945, and the war ended before she could carry out an operational patrol. She surrendered to the United States Navy in 1945 and was sunk as a target in 1946.

== Design and description ==
The I-201-class submarines were derived from the experimental high-speed Submarine No.71. They displaced 1,312 tonnes (1,291 long tons) surfaced and 1,473 tonnes (1,450 long tons) submerged. The submarines were 79 meters (259 ft 2 in) long, had a beam of 5.8 meters (19 ft 0 in) and a draft of 5.4 meters (17 ft 9 in). They were the deepest-diving Japanese submarines of the World War II, with a diving depth of 110 m (360 ft).

For surface running, the submarines were powered by two 1,375-brake-horsepower (1,025 kW) diesel engines, each driving one propeller shaft. When submerged each propeller was driven by a 2,500-horsepower (1,864 kW) electric motor. They could reach 15.2 knots (28.2 km/h; 17.5 mph) on the surface and 19 knots (35 km/h; 22 mph) underwater. On the surface, the I-201 class had a range of 5,800 nautical miles (10,700 km; 6,700 mi) at 14 knots (26 km/h; 16 mph); submerged, they had a range of 135 nmi (250 km; 155 mi) at 3 knots (5.6 km/h; 3.5 mph). They were fitted with a snorkel to allow them to run their diesel engines while underwater.

The submarines were armed with four internal bow 53.3 cm (21.0 in) torpedo tubes. They carried a total of 10 torpedoes. They were also armed with two single mounts for Type 96 25 mm anti-aircraft guns.

== Construction and commissioning ==
Ordered as Submarine No. 4503, I-203 was laid down on 1 June 1944 by the Kure Naval Arsenal at Kure, Japan. She was launched on 20 October, and was completed and commissioned on 29 May 1945.

== Service history ==
=== World War II ===
Upon commissioning, I-203 was attached to the Kure Naval District and assigned to Submarine Division 33 in the Kure Submarine Squadron. She was reassigned on 25 June 1945 to Submarine Squadron 11 in the 6th Fleet.

On 15 August 1945, I-203 was at Maizuru, Japan, with her sister ships I-201 and I-202 when she was reassigned to Submarine Division 15 in the 6th Fleet. The same day, hostilities between Japan and the Allies came to an end. Japan formally surrendered in a ceremony aboard the United States Navy battleship USS Missouri in Tokyo Bay on 2 September 1945, and I-203 surrendered to the Allies at Maizuru that day.

=== Postwar ===
In November 1945, I-203 departed Maizuru bound for Sasebo, Japan, which she reached on 25 November 1945. The Japanese struck her from the Navy list on 30 November 1945. On 12 December 1945, she got underway from Sasebo for sea trials, manned by a U.S. Navy crew and a skeleton Imperial Japanese Navy crew. Between 28 December 1945 and 8 January 1946, she and I-201 put to sea from Sasebo for a series of short sea trials with U.S. Navy crews, supported by the U.S. Navy submarine tender USS Euryale.

At 07:30 on 13 January 1946, I-201 and I-203 got underway from Sasebo in company with Euryale and the rescue and salvage ship USS Current bound for Pearl Harbor, Hawaii, with stops planned at Guam in the Mariana Islands, Eniwetok in the Marshall Islands, and Johnston Atoll. The vessels proceeded due south toward Guam in a column formation, with Euryale in the lead followed by I-201, I-203, and Current, with each vessel 1,500 yards (1,370 m) from the vessel ahead and astern of her. While proceeding to Guam, the ships rode out a typhoon, during which both submarines suffered engine breakdowns and I-201 had a steering failure. After repairs at sea, the ships arrived at Apra Harbor on Guam at 16:15 on 21 January 1946, receiving a boisterous welcome. The crews were granted shore leave on Guam.

The vessels departed Guam on 25 January 1946 on the next leg of their voyage. I-203 again suffered engine failure on 29 January that reportedly forced her to spend an additional night at sea, although she also reportedly reached Eniwetok on 31 January 1946 along with the rest of the vessels. The formation commander decided to skip the planned stop at Johnston Atoll and proceed directly from Eniwetok to Pearl Harbor. A direct trip from Eniwetok to Pearl Harbor exceeded I-201′s and I-203′s range, so he ordered the two submarines to be towed. At 07:00 on 2 February 1946, the vessels left Eniwetok. The formation arrived at Pearl Harbor on 13 February 1946, and I-201 and I-203 entered a caretaker status there with skeleton crews while the U.S. Navy studied their design.

== Disposal ==
With postwar relations with the Soviet Union deteriorating rapidly and concerns growing in the United States that under postwar agreements the Soviets would demand access to the captured Japanese submarines that would provide the Soviet Navy with valuable information about advanced Japanese submarine designs, the U.S. Navy issued orders on 26 March 1946 to sink all captured Japanese submarines. Accordingly, the U.S. Navy sank I-203 as a target in tests of the Mark 9 exploder off Pearl Harbor on 21 May 1946. She sank at 11:43 at 21°13′N 158°08′W after the submarine USS Caiman hit her with a Mark 18 Mod 2 torpedo.
