= Japanese submarine I-201 =

1st class submarine of the Imperial Japanese Navy

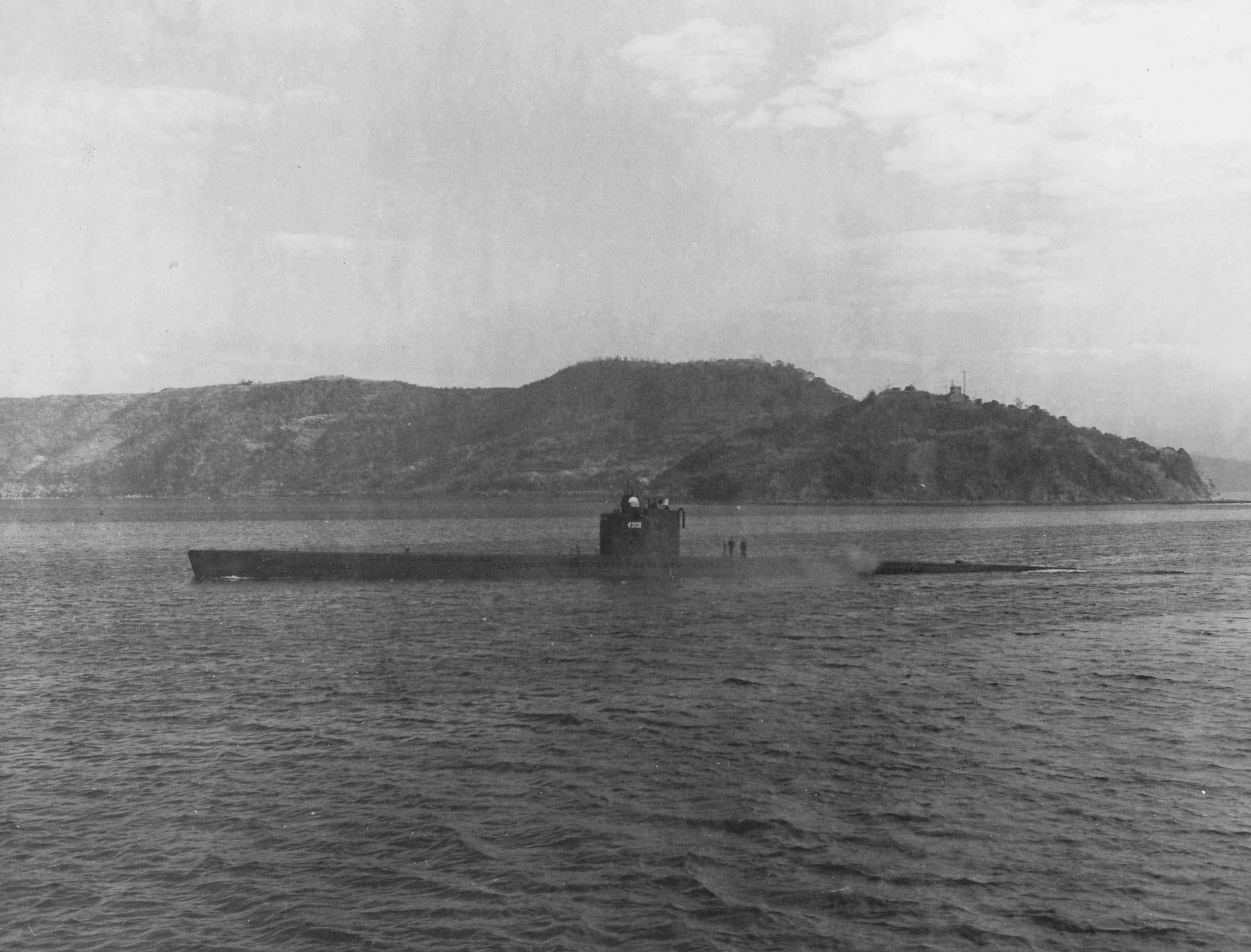
- I-201 off Sasebo, Japan, on 9 November 1945.

History

Empire of Japan
- Name: I-201
- Builder: Kure Naval Arsenal, Kure, Japan
- Laid down: 1 March 1944
- Launched: 22 July 1944
- Completed: 2 February 1945
- Commissioned: 2 February 1945
- Fate: Surrendered 2 September 1945; Stricken 30 November 1945; Sunk as target 23 May 1946

General characteristics
- Class & type: I-201-class submarine
- Displacement: 1,291 long tons (1,312 t) surfaced; 1,450 long tons (1,473 t) submerged
- Length: 79 m (259 ft 2 in)
- Beam: 5.8 m (19 ft 0 in)
- Draft: 5.4 m (17 ft 9 in)
- Installed power: 2,750 bhp (2,050 kW) (diesels); 5,000 hp (3,700 kW) (electric motors)
- Propulsion: Diesel-electric; 2 × diesel engines; 2 × electric motors
- Speed: 15.8 knots (29.3 km/h; 18.2 mph) surfaced; 19 knots (35 km/h; 22 mph) submerged
- Range: 5,800 nmi (10,700 km; 6,700 mi) at 14 knots (26 km/h; 16 mph) surfaced; 135 nmi (250 km; 155 mi) at 3 knots (5.6 km/h; 3.5 mph) submerged
- Test depth: 110 m (360 ft)
- Complement: 31
- Armament: 4 × bow 533 mm (21 in) torpedo tubes; 2 × single Type 96 25 mm (0.98 in) anti-aircraft guns

I-201 was the name ship of her class of high-speed submarines built for the Imperial Japanese Navy during World War II. She was commissioned in February 1945, and the war ended before she could carry out an operational patrol. She surrendered to the United States Navy in 1945 and was sunk as a target in 1946.

== Design and description ==
The I-201-class submarines were derived from the experimental high-speed Submarine No.71. They displaced 1,291 long tons (1,312 t) surfaced and 1,450 long tons (1,473 t) submerged. The submarines were 79 meters (259 ft 2 in) long, had a beam of 5.8 meters (19 ft 0 in) and a draft of 5.4 meters (17 ft 9 in). They were the deepest-diving Japanese submarines of the World War II, with a diving depth of 110 m (360 ft).

For surface running, the submarines were powered by two 1,375-brake-horsepower (1,025 kW) diesel engines, each driving one propeller shaft. When submerged each propeller was driven by a 2,500-horsepower (1,864 kW) electric motor. They could reach 15.2 knots (28.2 km/h; 17.5 mph) on the surface and 19 knots (35 km/h; 22 mph) underwater. On the surface, the I-201 class had a range of 5,800 nautical miles (10,700 km; 6,700 mi) at 14 knots (26 km/h; 16 mph); submerged, they had a range of 135 nmi (250 km; 155 mi) at 3 knots (5.6 km/h; 3.5 mph). They were fitted with a snorkel to allow them to run their diesel engines while underwater.

The submarines were armed with four internal bow 53.3 cm (21.0 in) torpedo tubes. They carried a total of 10 torpedoes. They were also armed with two single mounts for Type 96 25 mm anti-aircraft guns.

== Construction and commissioning ==
Ordered as Submarine No. 4501, I-201 was laid down on 1 March 1944 by the Kure Naval Arsenal at Kure, Japan. She was launched on 22 July 1944, and was completed and commissioned on 2 February 1945 as the lead unit of the I-201 class.

== Service history ==
=== World War II ===
Upon commissioning, I-201 was attached to the Kure Naval District and assigned to Submarine Division 33 in the Kure Submarine Squadron for performance tests. She was reassigned on 15 April 1945 to Submarine Squadron 11 in the 6th Fleet and on 15 June 1945 to Submarine Division 34 in the 6th Fleet.

On 15 August 1945, I-201 was at Maizuru, Japan, with her sister ships I-202 and I-203 when she was reassigned to Submarine Division 15 in the 6th Fleet. The same day, hostilities between Japan and the Allies came to an end. Japan formally surrendered in a ceremony aboard the United States Navy battleship USS Missouri (BB-63) in Tokyo Bay on 2 September 1945, and I-201 surrendered to the Allies at Maizuru that day.

=== Postwar ===
In November 1945, I-201 departed Maizuru bound for Sasebo, Japan, which she reached on 25 November 1945. The Japanese struck her from the Navy list on 30 November 1945. A fire broke out aboard her on 11 December 1945 that destroyed fourteen of her battery cells in her forward battery compartment. Between 28 December 1945 and 8 January 1946, she and I-203 put to sea from Sasebo for a series of short sea trials with U.S. Navy crews, supported by the U.S. Navy submarine tender USS Euryale (AS-22).

At 07:30 on 13 January 1946, I-201 and I-203 got underway from Sasebo in company with Euryale and the rescue and salvage ship USS Current (ARS-22) bound for Pearl Harbor, Hawaii, with stops planned at Guam in the Mariana Islands, Eniwetok in the Marshall Islands, and Johnston Atoll. The vessels proceeded due south toward Guam in a column formation, with Euryale in the lead followed by I-201, I-203, and Current, with each vessel 1,500 yards (1,370 m) from the vessel ahead and astern of her. While proceeding to Guam, the ships rode out a typhoon, during which both submarines suffered engine breakdowns and I-201 had a steering failure. After repairs at sea, the ships arrived at Apra Harbor on Guam at 16:15 on 21 January 1946, receiving a boisterous welcome. The crews were granted shore leave on Guam.

The vessels departed Guam on 25 January 1946 on the next leg of their voyage. I-201 again suffered engine failure at 09:00 on 26 January, so Current took her in tow, and the vessels reached Eniwetok on 31 January 1946. The formation commander decided to skip the planned stop at Johnston Atoll and proceed directly from Eniwetok to Pearl Harbor. A direct trip from Eniwetok to Pearl Harbor exceeded I-201′s and I-203′s range, so he ordered the two submarines to be towed. At 07:00 on 2 February 1946, the vessels left Eniwetok, with Euryalus towing I-201. The formation arrived at Pearl Harbor on 13 February 1946, and I-201 and I-203 entered a caretaker status there with skeleton crews while the U.S. Navy studied their design.

== Disposal ==
With postwar relations with the Soviet Union deteriorating rapidly and concerns growing in the United States that under postwar agreements the Soviets would demand access to the captured Japanese submarines that would provide the Soviet Navy with valuable information about advanced Japanese submarine designs, the U.S. Navy issued orders on 26 March 1946 to sink all captured Japanese submarines. Accordingly, the U.S. Navy sank I-201 as a target in tests of the Mark 9 exploder off Pearl Harbor on 23 May 1946. She sank at 10:58 at 21°13′N 158°08′W after the submarine USS Queenfish (SS-393) hit her with a Mark 18 Mod 2 torpedo.

== Discovery of wreck ==
During a search sponsored by the National Geographic Society, the Hawaii Undersea Research Laboratory's (HURL) deep-diving submersibles Pisces IV and Pisces V located the wreck of the Japanese submarine I-14 in approximately 800 meters (2,625 ft) of water off Barbers Point, Oahu, Hawaii, on 15 February 2009. While Pisces V was being recovered and Pisces IV was preparing to ascend from the ocean bottom, Pisces IV′s crew acquired a sonar contact on the what appeared to be the bow of a smaller submarine nearby. On 16 February 2009, the two submersibles conducted an extensive search of the sea bottom in the area for the rest of the smaller submarine. They had no success until Pisces V was being recovered and Pisces IV was preparing to leave the sea bottom, when Pisces IV′s crew gained sonar contact on what appeared to be the hull of the smaller submarine. A quick investigation of the new contact revealed the main portion of the wreck of I-201, with "I-201" and the Imperial Japanese Navy's battle flag clearly painted on the conning tower and a chrysanthemum painted on the side of the periscope mast.

The submersibles returned to the sea bottom on 17 February 2009 to carry out an extensive survey of both wrecks. Their crews found both submarines broken into two pieces, with I-14′s bow lying equidistant from her main hull section and I-201′s bow, and I-201′s main hull section about an equal distance from I-201′s bow. The submersibles found I-201′s bow lying on its port side and neatly sheared off from the main hull section, which sat at a 45-degree angle. The aft retractable deck gun was bent but visible, and the submersible crews could see the forward retractable deck gun through its opening in the deck. Unusually, much of the wood planking on the top deck — largely or totally absent in other Japanese submarine wrecks in the area — still existed.

Researchers announced the discovery of the wrecks of I-14 and I-201 on 12 November 2009. The search for the wrecks and video footage of them on the ocean bottom was featured in the documentary Hunt for the Samurai Subs, which premiered in the United States on the National Geographic Channel on 17 November 2009.

In November 2023 EV Nautilus surveyed the wreck, taking photos of the wreck itself and of a dud torpedo near the wreck.
