= K26 =

K26 or K-26 may refer to:

- K-26 (Kansas highway)
- HMS K26, a submarine of the Royal Navy
- Sonata in E-flat, K. 26, by Wolfgang Amadeus Mozart
