= HMS R2 =

Submarine of the Royal Navy

- R-class submarine

History

United Kingdom
- Name: HMS R2
- Builder: Chatham Dockyard, Kent
- Laid down: 4 February 1917
- Launched: 25 April 1918
- Commissioned: 20 December 1918
- Fate: Sold, 21 February 1923

General characteristics
- Class & type: R-class submarine
- Displacement: 410 long tons (417 t) surfaced; 503 long tons (511 t) submerged
- Length: 163 ft 9 in (49.91 m)
- Beam: 15 ft 3 in (4.65 m)
- Draught: 11 ft 6 in (3.51 m)
- Installed power: 240 bhp (180 kW) (diesel); 1,200 hp (890 kW) (electric)
- Propulsion: 1 × diesel engine; 1 × electric motor
- Speed: 9.5 knots (17.6 km/h; 10.9 mph) surfaced; 15 knots (28 km/h; 17 mph) submerged
- Range: 2,400 nmi (4,400 km; 2,800 mi) at 9 knots (17 km/h; 10 mph) surfaced; 60 nmi (110 km; 69 mi) at 5 knots (9.3 km/h; 5.8 mph) submerged
- Test depth: 150 feet (45.7 m)
- Complement: 2 officers and 20 ratings
- Sensors & processing systems: Bow hydrophone array
- Armament: 6 × bow 18-inch (45 cm) torpedo tubes

HMS R2 was one of 10 R-class submarine built for the Royal Navy during the First World War. The boat was not completed before the end of the war and was sold for scrap in 1923.

== Design and description ==
The R-class submarine was designed to meet an Admiralty requirement for a specialised hunter-killer submarine with an emphasis on submerged performance. The boats had a length of 163 feet 9 inches (49.9 m) overall, a beam of 15 feet 3 inches (4.6 m) and a mean draught of 11 feet 6 inches (3.5 m). They displaced 410 long tons (420 t) on the surface and 503 long tons (511 t) submerged. The R-class submarines had a crew of 2 officers and 20 ratings. They had a diving depth of 150 feet (45.7 m).

For surface running, the boats were powered by a single eight-cylinder 240-brake-horsepower (179 kW) diesel engine that drove the single propeller shaft. When submerged it was driven by a 1,200-horsepower (895 kW) electric motor. They could reach 9.5 knots (17.6 km/h; 10.9 mph) on the surface and 15 knots (28 km/h; 17 mph) underwater. On the surface, the R class had a range of 2,400 nautical miles (4,400 km; 2,800 mi) at 9 knots (17 km/h; 10 mph) and 60 nmi (110 km; 69 mi) at 5 knots (9.3 km/h; 5.8 mph) submerged.

The boats were armed with six 18-inch (45 cm) torpedo tubes in the bow. They carried six reload torpedoes for a grand total of a dozen torpedoes. They were equipped with an array of five hydrophones in the bow to allow them to locate and engage targets while submerged.

== Construction and career ==
HMS R2 was laid down at Chatham Dockyard on 4 February 1917, launched on 25 April 1918 and commissioned on 20 December. She came too late to see any combat in World War I, like most of the other R class submarines. R2 was sold on 21 February 1923 to E. Suren.
