= HMS R1 =

Submarine of the Royal Navy

- R-class submarine

History

United Kingdom
- Name: HMS R1
- Builder: Chatham Dockyard, Kent
- Laid down: 4 February 1917
- Launched: 25 April 1918
- Commissioned: 14 October 1918
- Fate: Sold, 20 January 1923

General characteristics
- Class & type: R-class submarine
- Displacement: 410 long tons (417 t) surfaced; 503 long tons (511 t) submerged
- Length: 163 ft 9 in (49.91 m)
- Beam: 15 ft 3 in (4.65 m)
- Draught: 11 ft 6 in (3.51 m)
- Installed power: 240 bhp (180 kW) (diesel); 1,200 hp (890 kW) (electric)
- Propulsion: 1 × diesel engine; 1 × electric motor
- Speed: 9.5 knots (17.6 km/h; 10.9 mph) surfaced; 15 knots (28 km/h; 17 mph) submerged
- Range: 2,400 nmi (4,400 km; 2,800 mi) at 9 knots (17 km/h; 10 mph) surfaced; 60 nmi (110 km; 69 mi) at 5 knots (9.3 km/h; 5.8 mph) submerged
- Test depth: 150 feet (45.7 m)
- Complement: 2 officers and 20 ratings
- Sensors & processing systems: Bow hydrophone array
- Armament: 6 × bow 18-inch (45 cm) torpedo tubes

HMS R1 was one of 10 R-class submarine built for the Royal Navy during the First World War. The boat was completed shortly before the end of the war and was sold for scrap in 1923.

== Design and description ==
The R-class submarine was designed to meet an Admiralty requirement for a specialised hunter-killer submarine with an emphasis on submerged performance. The boats had a length of 163 feet 9 inches (49.9 m) overall, a beam of 15 feet 3 inches (4.6 m) and a mean draft of 11 feet 6 inches (3.5 m). They displaced 410 long tons (420 t) on the surface and 503 long tons (511 t) submerged. The R-class submarines had a crew of 2 officers and 20 ratings. They had a diving depth of 150 feet (45.7 m).

For surface running, the boats were powered by a single eight-cylinder, 240-brake-horsepower (179 kW) diesel engine that drove the single propeller shaft. When submerged it was driven by a 1,200-horsepower (895 kW) electric motor. They could reach 9.5 knots (17.6 km/h; 10.9 mph) on the surface and 15 knots (28 km/h; 17 mph) underwater. On the surface, the R class had a range of 2,400 nautical miles (4,400 km; 2,800 mi) at 9 knots (17 km/h; 10 mph) and 60 nmi (110 km; 69 mi) at 5 knots (9.3 km/h; 5.8 mph) submerged.

The boats were armed with six 18-inch (45 cm) torpedo tubes in the bow. They carried six reload torpedoes for a grand total of a dozen torpedoes. They were equipped with an array of five hydrophones in the bow to allow them to locate and engage targets while submerged.

== Construction and career ==
HMS R1 was laid down at Chatham Dockyard on 4 February 1917 and launched on 25 April 1918 by Lady Sturdee. (Note: Wife of Admiral Sir Doveton Sturdee) The boat was commissioned on 14 October 1918. She came too late to see any combat in World War I, like most of the other R-class submarines.

R1 was listed as being part of the 14th Submarine Flotilla, part of the Grand Fleet, in January 1919. By March, she had transferred to the Fourth Submarine Flotilla, and remained part of that flotilla in August 1919. In November 1919, R1 was listed as allocated to join the material reserve at Portsmouth "later", and in January 1920, was listed as being at Portsmouth, but still awaiting transfer to the material reserve. In September 1921 she was towed from the Firth of Forth to Chatham Dockyard for preparation to be put into the material reserve at Gosport, where she arrived on 10 January 1922. R1 was sold for scrap on 20 January 1923 to J. Smith, who also acquired R11 and R12.
