= British R-class submarine =

1918 class of British attack submarines

- HMS R2

Class overview
- Name: R class
- Builders: Chatham Dockyard, Kent (R1–R4); Pembroke, Wales (R5 & R6); Vickers, Barrow-in-Furness (R7 &R8); Armstrong, Elswick (R9 & R10); Cammell Laird, Birkenhead (R11 & R12)
- Operators: Royal Navy
- Preceded by: P class
- Succeeded by: S class
- Built: 1917–1918
- In commission: 1918–1934
- Planned: 12
- Completed: 10
- Canceled: 2

General characteristics
- Type: Submarine
- Displacement: 420 long tons (427 t) surfaced; 500 long tons (508 t) submerged
- Length: 163 ft (50 m)
- Beam: 16 ft (4.9 m)
- Draught: 11 ft 6 in (3.51 m)
- Propulsion: 8-cylinder diesel engine, 480 hp (360 kW); 2 × electric motors, 1,200 hp (890 kW) total; Single electric motor for low speed running; One shaft
- Speed: 9.5 knots (17.6 km/h) surfaced; 14 knots (26 km/h) submerged
- Endurance: Submerged: 1 hour at 14 kn (26 km/h; 16 mph)
- Complement: 2 officers and 20 ratings
- Sensors & processing systems: Bow hydrophone array
- Armament: 6 × 18 in (457 mm) torpedo tubes (forward); 12 × 18 inch torpedoes

The R-class submarines were a class of 12 small British diesel-electric submarines built for the Royal Navy during World War I, and were forerunners of the modern attack submarine, in that they were designed specifically to attack and sink enemy submarines, their battery capacity and hull shape being good for underwater performance.

With a submerged speed of 14 knots (26 km/h; 16 mph), the class set an underwater speed record not broken until the experimental Japanese Submarine No.71 of 1938, which was capable of more than 21 knots (39 km/h; 24 mph) submerged.

== Description ==
Ordered in December 1917, the R class were designed to be faster underwater than on the surface, achieving a submerged speed of 14 kn (26 km/h; 16 mph) versus a surfaced speed of 9 kn (17 km/h; 10 mph). They were well-streamlined, having no external ballast tanks, casing, or deck gun and a streamlined spindle-shaped hull of circular cross-section (not reproduced until the American USS Albacore) which tapered sharply towards the stern and allowed only for a single screw. The bulbous bow contained five sensitive hydrophones and the lightened conning tower was also well-streamlined.

Thirty-five per cent of the space inside the pressure hull was occupied by machinery. An 8-cylinder 480 hp (360 kW) diesel engine was installed for surface propulsion, while high underwater speed was given by two large electric motors arranged one behind the other to drive the propeller shaft, and powered by a 200-cell battery of the same type fitted to British J-class submarines. The large battery was sufficient for only about an hour at full power. The engine took all day to charge the batteries, using half its power. Charging was done in harbour, using a supply of electricity from the shore or from special battery charging vessels.

Despite being designed for maximum underwater performance, the R-class submarines were extremely difficult to control submerged, especially at high speeds. Surfaced, they had poor seakeeping and were slow. Minor modifications were made to R4, the only submarine of the class to survive into the 1930s, which made it more manageable on the surface, but reduced its submerged speed to a maximum 13 kn (24 km/h; 15 mph).

=== Armament ===
The R class were the first Royal Navy submarines to be fitted with six bow torpedo tubes, number of torpedoes being considered more important than range or size of warhead carried when attacking U-boats. The torpedo tubes were originally the smaller 18-inch (457 mm) but later changed to 21 inch (533 mm). As designed, one spare torpedo was allowed for, but in operation six reloads were carried in place of the senior ratings' accommodation. It was originally intended to fit a 4-inch (102 mm) gun on the foredeck, but this was dropped due to the adverse effect it would have had on submerged speed.

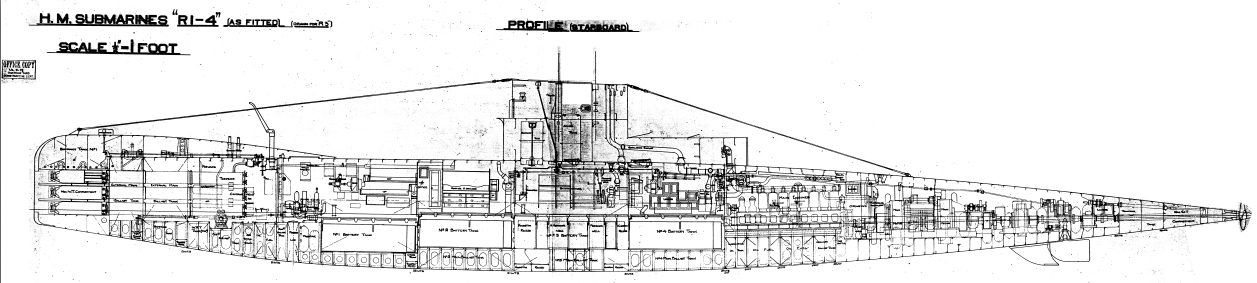
R1−R4 Submarine plans

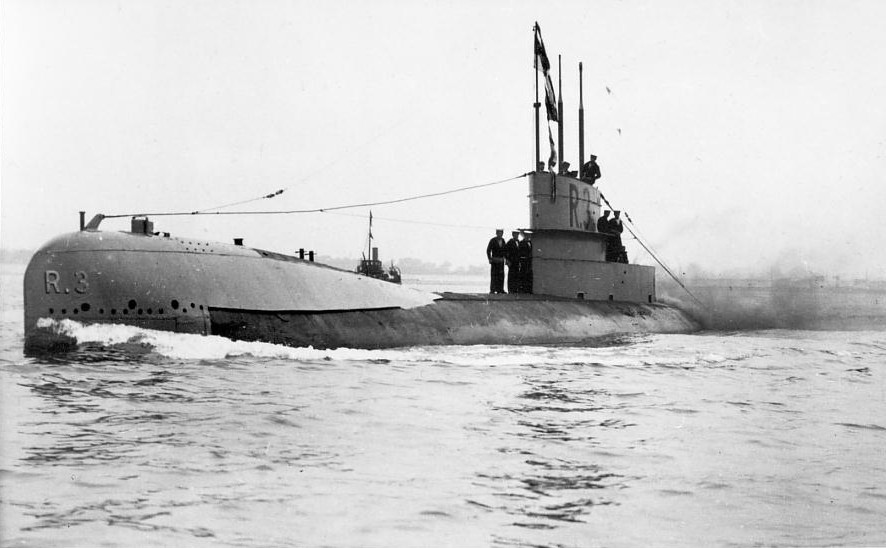
R3 at sea

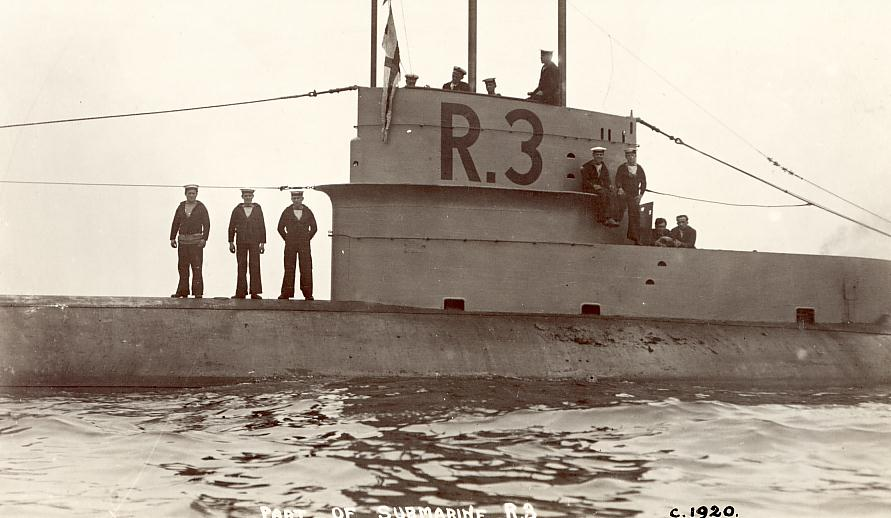
R3 at sea

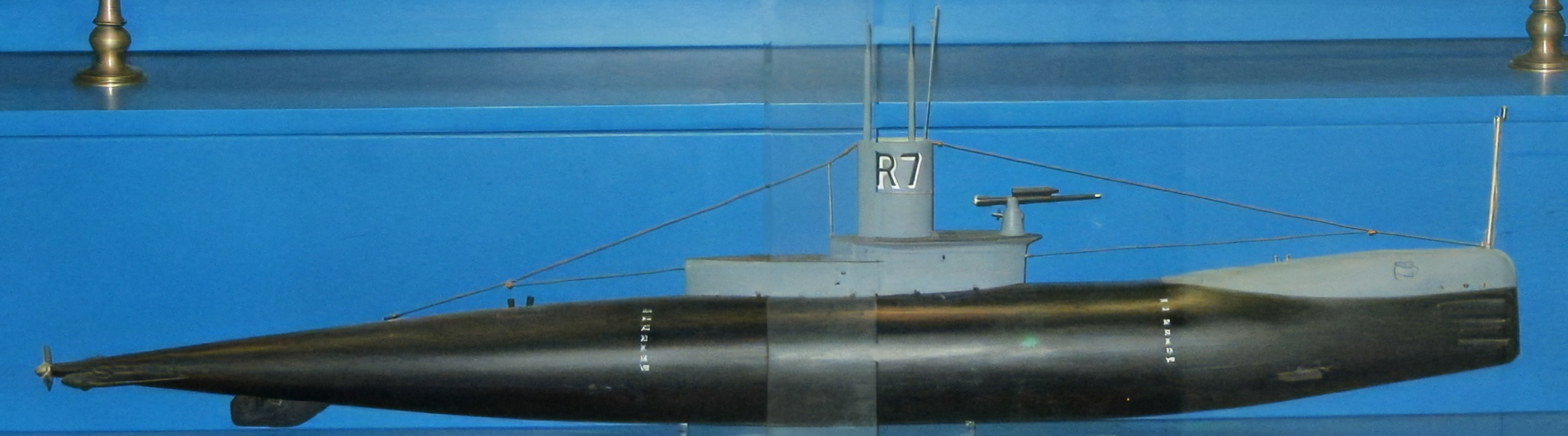
Model of an R-class submarine

HMS R2

== Construction ==
R1 through R4 were ordered from Chatham Dockyard, R5 and R6 from HMNB Devonport (later changed to Pembroke Dock), R7 and R8 from Vickers, R9 and R10 from Armstrongs and R11 and R12 from Cammell Laird. In August 1919, with World War I over, R5 and R6 were cancelled, the rest being completed. To save time, they used H-class components.

== Service ==
Operating from Killybegs, County Donegal, one of the class reportedly tracked and fired on a German U-boat in October 1918, firing a full salvo of six torpedoes. Only one hit, but it failed to detonate.

All but R4 and R10 were sold for scrap in 1923. The two survivors were relegated to ASW training at Portland. Pitched against poor performing naval trawlers, the trawlers were no match to the high performance of the submarines. R10 was sold in 1929, while R4 survived as a fast underwater target at Portland until 1934.

== R-class submarines ==
- HMS R1
- HMS R2
- HMS R3
- HMS R4
- HMS R5 *
- HMS R6 *
- HMS R7
- HMS R8
- HMS R9
- HMS R10
- HMS R11
- HMS R12

* Cancelled while under construction
