= HMS C20 =

Submarine of the Royal Navy

History

United Kingdom
- Name: HMS C20
- Builder: HM Dockyard Chatham
- Laid down: 1 June 1908
- Launched: 27 November 1909
- Commissioned: 31 January 1910
- Fate: Sold, 26 May 1921

General characteristics
- Class & type: C-class submarine
- Displacement: 290 long tons (290 t) surfaced; 320 long tons (330 t) submerged
- Length: 142 ft 3 in (43.4 m)
- Beam: 13 ft 7 in (4.1 m)
- Draught: 11 ft 6 in (3.5 m)
- Installed power: 600 bhp (450 kW) petrol; 300 hp (220 kW) electric
- Propulsion: 1 × 16-cylinder Vickers petrol engine; 1 × electric motor
- Speed: 13 kn (24 km/h; 15 mph) surfaced; 8 kn (15 km/h; 9.2 mph) submerged
- Range: 910 nmi (1,690 km; 1,050 mi) at 12 kn (22 km/h; 14 mph) on the surface
- Test depth: 100 feet (30.5 m)
- Complement: 2 officers and 14 ratings
- Armament: 2 × 18 in (450 mm) bow torpedo tubes

HMS C20 was one of 38 C-class submarines built for the Royal Navy in the first decade of the 20th century. The boat survived the First World War and was sold for scrap in 1921.

== Design and description ==
The C-class boats of the 1907–08 and subsequent Naval Programmes were modified to improve their speed, both above and below the surface. The submarine had a length of 142 feet 3 inches (43.4 m) overall, a beam of 13 feet 7 inches (4.1 m) and a mean draught of 11 feet 6 inches (3.5 m). They displaced 290 long tons (290 t) on the surface and 320 long tons (330 t) submerged. The C-class submarines had a crew of two officers and fourteen ratings.

For surface running, the boats were powered by a single 12-cylinder 600-brake-horsepower (447 kW) Vickers petrol engine that drove one propeller shaft. When submerged the propeller was driven by a 300-horsepower (224 kW) electric motor. They could reach 13 knots (24 km/h; 15 mph) on the surface and 8 knots (15 km/h; 9.2 mph) underwater. On the surface, the C class had a range of 910 nautical miles (1,690 km; 1,050 mi) at 12 knots (22 km/h; 14 mph).

The boats were armed with two 18-inch (45 cm) torpedo tubes in the bow. They could carry a pair of reload torpedoes, but generally did not as they would have to remove an equal weight of fuel in compensation.

== Construction and career ==
C20 was laid down on 1 June 1908 by Chatham Royal Dockyard, launched on 27 November 1909, and completed on 31 January 1910. During World War I, the boat was generally used for coastal defence and training in home waters. HMS C20 was sold on 26 May 1921 in Sunderland.
