= I-201-class submarine =

Class of submarines of the Imperial Japanese Navy

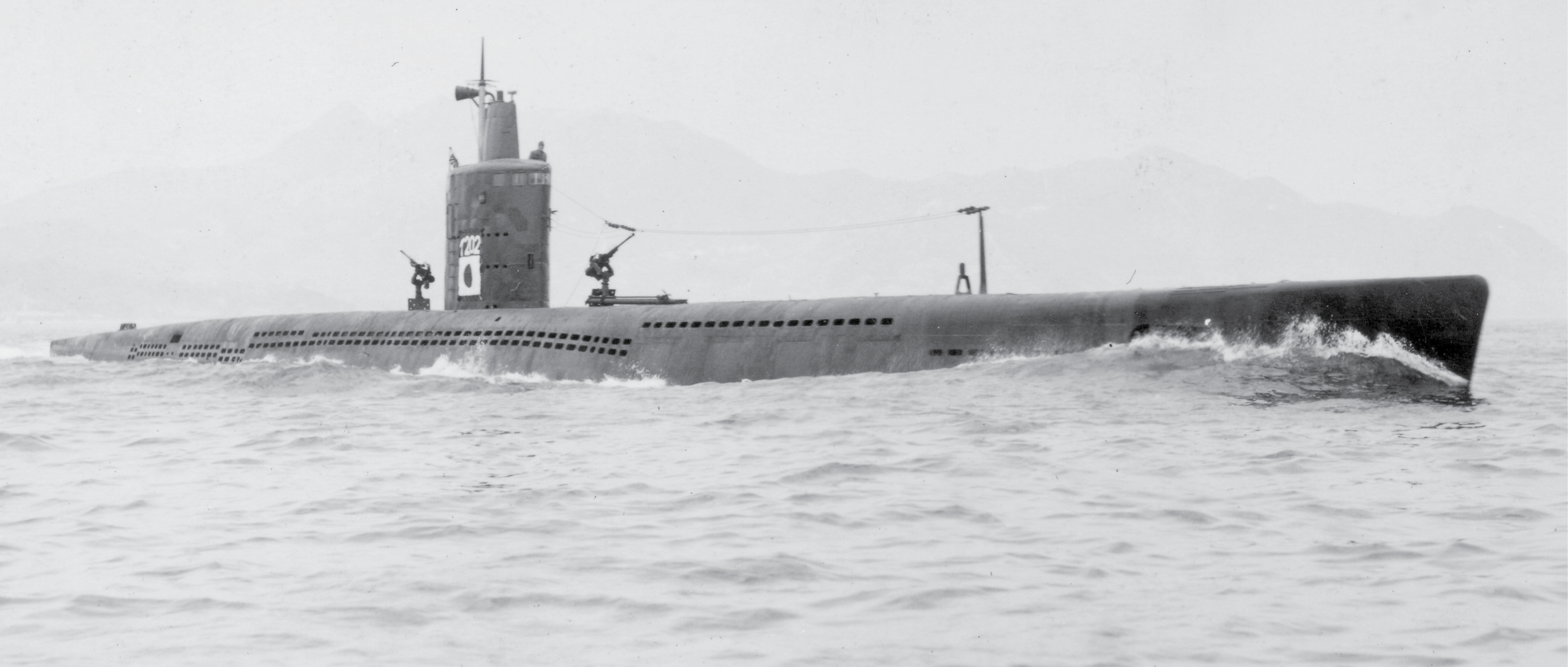
- Sentaka I-202 at high surface speed

Class overview
- Builders: Kure Naval Arsenal
- Operators: Imperial Japanese Navy
- Preceded by: I-400-class submarine
- Subclasses: I-201-class, Project No. S56_{3}; I-207-class, Project No. S56B
- Built: 1945
- In service: 1945
- In commission: 1945
- Planned: 23
- Completed: 3
- Scrapped: 3

General characteristics
- Type: Submarine
- Displacement: 1,291 long tons (1,312 t) surfaced; 1,450 long tons (1,470 t) submerged
- Length: 79 m (259 ft) overall; 59.2 m (194 ft) pressure hull
- Beam: 5.8 m (19 ft) pressure hull; 9.2 m (30 ft) max. across stern fins
- Height: 7 m (23 ft) (keel to main deck)
- Propulsion: Diesel-electric; 2 × MAN Mk.1 diesel (マ式1号ディーゼル, Ma-Shiki 1 Gō diesel), build by Kawasaki and Mitsubishi. 2,750 hp (2,050 kW); 4 × electric motors, 5,000 hp (3,700 kW) at 600 rpm; 2 shafts
- Speed: 15.75 knots (29.17 km/h) surfaced; 19 knots (35 km/h) submerged
- Range: 15,000 nmi (28,000 km) at 6 knots (11 km/h); 7,800 nmi (14,400 km) at 11 knots (20 km/h); 5,800 nmi (10,700 km) at 14 knots (26 km/h); Submerged: 135 nmi (250 km) at 3 knots (5.6 km/h)
- Test depth: 110 m (360 ft)
- Complement: 31 (plan); approx. 50 (actual)
- Armament: 4 × 533 mm (21 in) bow torpedo tubes; 10 × Type 95 torpedoes; 2 × Type 96 25 mm AA guns

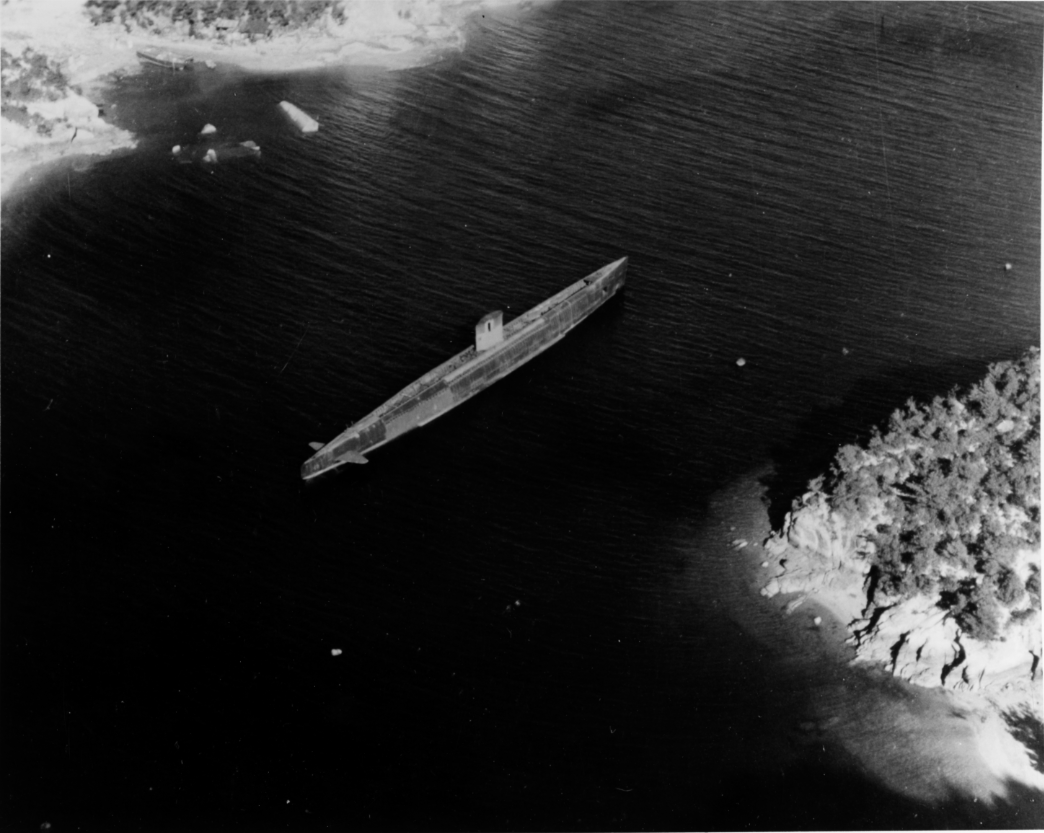
An unidentified I-201-class submarine in the vicinity of Kure, Japan, in October 1945.

The I-201-class submarines (伊二百一型潜水艦, I-ni-hyaku-ichi-gata sensuikan) were submarines of the Imperial Japanese Navy during World War II. These submarines were of advanced design, built for high underwater speed, and were known as Sentaka-Dai type submarine (潜高大型潜水艦, Sen-Taka-Dai-gata sensuikan, "Submarine High speed-Large type") or Sentaka type submarine (潜高型潜水艦, Sen-Taka-gata sensuikan, "Submarine High speed type"). The type name, was shortened to Suichū Kōsoku Sensuikan Ō-gata (水中高速潜水艦大型, Underwater High speed Submarine Large type).

They were one of the fastest submarine class built during World War II, second only to Walter Type XVII closed-cycle powered submarines. Twenty-three units were ordered from the Kure Naval Arsenal under the 1943 construction program. Due to the deteriorating war situation, only eight boats were laid down, and only three, numbered I-201, I-202 and I-203, were completed before the end of the war. None of them saw operational use.

== Background ==
In 1938 the Imperial Japanese Navy constructed an experimental high-speed submarine for evaluation purposes, which was designated Vessel Number 71 (第71号艦) for security purposes. Based on previous experience with high-speed, short-range midget submarines, Number 71 displaced only 230 tons surfaced with a length of 140 ft (43 m). She could attain a submerged speed of over 21 kn (39 km/h; 24 mph), making her the fastest submarine of her day. The results gained from experiments with Number 71 formed the basis for the I-201 class submarines.

== Design ==
General arrangements and sections of the type I-201 class submarine.

By late 1942 it had become apparent to the IJN that conventional submarines were unable to survive the new ASW techniques coming into service, such as radar, HF/DF, sonar, and new depth charge projectors. New submarines were required, with a higher underwater than surface speed, quick-diving capability, quiet underwater running, and a high underwater operational radius.

The IJN General Staff made an official request for high-speed submarines in October 1943 and among the ships planned in 1944 to be constructed in 1945 were 23 "underwater high speed submarines" (Sen taka) temporarily designated "Ships No. 4501–4523".

The General Staff's final requirements were stated in Order No. 295 dated 29 October 1943 to the Navy Technical Department. These included an underwater speed of 25 kn (46 km/h; 29 mph) which was reduced to 20 kn (37 km/h; 23 mph) for practical reasons. Nevertheless, they were the fastest operational submarines of World War II, outpacing even the German Type XXI.

To meet the requirement for high underwater speed the designers had to:

- Adopt a single-hull structure
- Locate the main ballast tank higher than previous submarines to give a higher center of gravity and improve dynamic stability
- Give the pressure hull and casing a highly streamlined form
- Make the conning tower as small as possible
- Replace fixed deck guns with retractable mounts housed in shuttered recesses when submerged.
- Use steel plates for the upper deck rather than wood
- Install underwater charging system (snorkel)
- Fit large horizontal control surfaces at the stern instead of the more usual bow-mounted dive planes; this improved directional stability and may have decreased turbulence-induced drag.
- Reduce the crew and crew accommodation to provide battery space; the Sen-Taka was designed for a crew of 31, compared to that the similar-sized Sen-Chu (54), and the Kai Dai 1 (60) Types (in practice the SenTaka needed a crew of 50 when it became operational, leading to an unforeseen habitation problem).
- Restrict the armament, also to save space; the Sen-Taka had the same torpedo outfit as the smaller Sen-Chu 2nd class submarine, and just half that of the comparable Kaidai 1st class submarine. Also the Sen-Taka had no deck gun, and the AA armament carried had to be held in retractable mounts, requiring hull space, in order to meet the streamlining requirement.

The I-201 class bore little resemblance to earlier I-boats, which were optimized for long range and high surfaced speed. By contrast, the I-201 emphasized submerged performance. It featured powerful electric motors, streamlined all-welded hulls, and a large capacity battery consisting of 4,192 cells. The maximum underwater speed of 19 knots (35 km/h) was double that of contemporary American designs. The I-201s, like other Japanese submarines of the period, were also equipped with a crude snorkel, allowing underwater diesel operation while recharging batteries.

I-201 displaced 1,291 tons surfaced and 1,451 tons submerged. It had a test depth of 360 feet (110 m). Armament consisted of four 53 cm (21 in) torpedo tubes and 10 Type 95 torpedoes. The two 25 mm anti-aircraft guns were housed in retractable mounts to maintain streamlining. The submarine was designed for mass production, with large sections prefabricated in factories and transported to the slip for final assembly.

== Fate ==
Two submarines, I-201 and I-203, were seized and inspected by the US Navy at the end of the hostilities. They were part of a group of four captured submarines, including the giant I-400 and I-401, which were sailed to Hawaii by US Navy technicians for further inspection.

On 26 March 1946, the US Navy decided to scuttle these captured Japanese submarines to prevent the technology from falling into the hands of the Soviet Union. On 5 April 1946, I-202 was scuttled in Japanese waters. On 21 May 1946, I-203 was torpedoed and sunk by submarine USS Caiman off the Hawaiian Islands. On 23 May 1946, I-201 was torpedoed and sunk by USS Queenfish. The Hawaii Undersea Research Laboratory found the wreck of the I-201 near Hawaii using submersible craft in 2009.

== Boats in class ==
Sub class	Boat #	Boat	Builder	Laid down	Launched	Completed	Decommissioned	Fate
I-201 (Pr. S56_{3})	4501	I-201	Kure Naval Arsenal	1 March 1944	22 July 1944	2 February 1945	30 November 1945	Sunk as a target off the Hawaiian Islands by USS Queenfish on 23 May 1946
I-201 (Pr. S56_{3})	4502	I-202	Kure Naval Arsenal	1 May 1944	2 September 1944	12 February 1945	30 November 1945	Scuttled by U.S. Navy off Gotō Islands on 5 April 1946
I-201 (Pr. S56_{3})	4503	I-203	Kure Naval Arsenal	1 June 1944	20 September 1944	29 May 1945	30 November 1945	Sunk as a target off the Hawaiian Islands by USS Caiman on 21 May 1946
I-201 (Pr. S56_{3})	4504	I-204	Kure Naval Arsenal	1 August 1944	16 December 1944			90% complete, sunk by air raid on 22 June 1945, salvaged and scrapped at Kure February–May 1948
I-201 (Pr. S56_{3})	4505	I-205	Kure Naval Arsenal	4 September 1944	15 February 1945			80% complete, sunk by air raid on 28 July 1945, salvaged and scrapped at Kure May–August 1948
I-201 (Pr. S56_{3})	4506	I-206	Kure Naval Arsenal	27 October 1944	26 March 1945			85% complete, construction stopped on 26 March 1945, scrapped at Kure October 1946-January 1947
I-207 (Pr. S56B)	4507	I-207	Kure Naval Arsenal	27 December 1944				20% complete, construction stopped on 17 April 1945, scrapped at Kure April–May 1946
I-207 (Pr. S56B)	4508	I-208	Kure Naval Arsenal	17 February 1945				5% complete, construction stopped on 17 April 1945, scrapped at Kure April–May 1946 with I-207
I-207 (Pr. S56B)	4509-4523							Constructions were not started until the end of the war.

== Influences ==
The I-201 design and technology influenced Japanese Maritime Self Defense Force JDS Oyashio (1959).

== In fiction ==
A refurbished I-203 is used by the characters in the film Hell and High Water (1954).

== See also ==
- German Type XXI submarine
- Ha-201-class submarine
- Vessel Number 71
- JDS Oyashio (SS-511)
