= Japanese submarine I-202 =

1944 I-201-class submarine

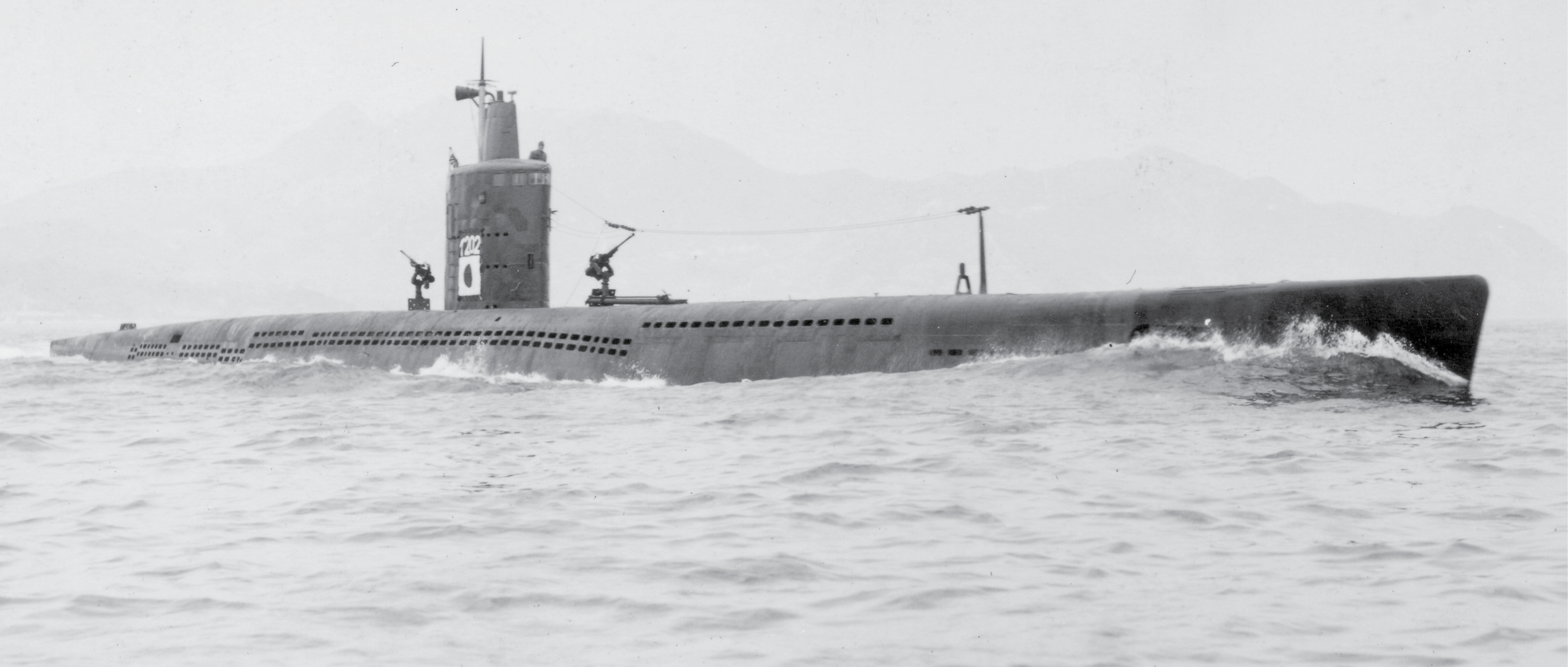
- I-202

History

Empire of Japan
- Name: I-202
- Builder: Kure Naval Arsenal
- Laid down: 1 May 1944
- Launched: 2 September 1944
- Fate: Sunk by US Navy off Gotō Islands on 5 April 1946

General characteristics
- Class & type: I-201-class submarine
- Displacement: 1,290 long tons (1,310 t) surfaced; 1,450 long tons (1,470 t) submerged
- Length: 79 m (259 ft) overall; 59.2 m (194 ft) pressure hull
- Beam: 5.8 m (19 ft) pressure hull; 9.2 m (30 ft) max. across stern fins
- Height: 7 m (23 ft) (keel to main deck)
- Propulsion: Diesel-electric; 2 × Mitsubishi Model 1 diesels, 2,750 hp (2,050 kW); 4 × electric motors, 5,000 hp (3,700 kW) at 600 rpm; Twin propellers
- Speed: 15.75 knots (29.17 km/h) surfaced; 19 knots (35 km/h) submerged
- Range: 15,000 nmi (28,000 km) at 6 knots (11 km/h); 7,800 nmi (14,400 km) at 11 knots (20 km/h); 5,800 nmi (10,700 km) at 14 knots (26 km/h); Submerged: 135 nmi (250 km) at 3 knots (5.6 km/h)
- Test depth: 110 m (360 ft)
- Complement: 31 officers and men
- Armament: 4 × 533 mm (21 in) bow torpedo tubes; 10 × Type 95 torpedoes; 2 × Type 96 25 mm (0.98 in) cannon

I-202 was the only one out of three I-201-class submarines of the Imperial Japanese Navy to be completed during World War II. The I-201 class were of advanced design, and had been built for high underwater speed. They were the fastest operational submarines built during World War II, surpassing even the German Type XXI submarines.

== Service history ==
Launched on 2 September 1944, I-202 was the second I-201-class submarine to be completed, on 12 February 1945.

After a battery charging operation which attempted to reduce the time taken by using higher current, I-202 suffered explosions in her battery compartments which ruined 500 battery cells and damaged her pressure hull. In June 1945 I-202 was in Kure Naval Arsenal for repairs to her pressure hull, and to replace her ruined batteries. When the work was nearly completed, an air raid warning was given and Captain Imai decided to sail immediately. I-202 had reached the open sea when bombing of the base began, but as it was unable to dive it was hit on the aft deck by strafing aircraft.

I-204 was sunk as result of the raid and it was decided to evacuate to Maizuru, Kyoto. A convoy of 35 small cargo vessels, some minesweepers, and five submarines including I-202 and I-201 left Kure at the end of June to run the Kanmon Straits by night. I-202 made the dangerous passage surfaced, on battery power, with the entire crew except for essential personnel assembled on the top deck and forbidden to move.

I-202's repairs were completed at Maizuru and she resumed training and embarked a load of torpedoes.

At the end of July the Staff of the Sixth Fleet held a conference at which Captain Imai was present. It was decided to sail to the Pacific Ocean in early August by way of Yokosuka. However, when Imai returned to Maizuru on 31 July 1945 the port was under heavy attack by carrier-based aircraft. Despite spending the raid submerged, I-202 had suffered slight damage, its periscope being destroyed and some of its casing plates penetrated by splinters. This damage meant that the planned operation could not be conducted, and the submarine had to wait for a new periscope to arrive.

While I-202 was waiting at Maizuru, the atomic bombs were dropped on Hiroshima and Nagasaki and the Soviet Union declared war on Japan, while Maizuru was under constant threat of air attack.

On 15 August the war ended with the surrender of Japan but two days later I-202 sailed with I-201, I-121, Ro-500 and one other submarine and deployed in a line 150 mi (240 km) off Vladivostok. The Sixth Fleet staff ordered them on several occasions to return to Maizuru, and on 22 August a staff officer flew into Maizuru to stress the importance of the order. The submarines finally returned to Maizuru on 24 August after destroying their radios and other equipment, and in October sailed to Sasebo where they and their sister ship I-203 were taken out of service on 30 November and handed over to the Occupation Forces.

== Postwar ==
I-202 was scheduled to be delivered to Britain, but the Soviet Union was also strongly interested in acquiring it, and it was eventually sunk by the US Navy off the Gotō Islands on 5 April 1946 to avoid trouble between Britain and the Soviets.
