= HMS K26 =

Submarine of the Royal Navy

- K26

History

United Kingdom
- Name: K26
- Ordered: 10 June 1918
- Builder: Vickers, Barrow in Furness
- Launched: 26 August 1919
- Commissioned: 15 September 1923
- Fate: Sold for scrapping March 1931 to Mamo Brothers, Malta

General characteristics
- Class & type: Modified K class submarine
- Displacement: 2,140 long tons (2,170 t) surfaced; 2,530 long tons (2,570 t) submerged
- Length: 351 ft (107 m)
- Beam: 28 ft 6 in (8.69 m)
- Draught: 19 ft 9 in (6.02 m)
- Propulsion: 2 × Brown-Curtis or Parsons geared steam turbines, 10,500 shp (7,830 kW) each; 2 × Oil-fired Yarrow boilers; 4 × Electric motors, 1,440 hp (1,070 kW) each; 1 × Vickers diesel generator for charging batteries on the surface, 800 hp (600 kW); 2 screws
- Speed: 23.5 knots (27.0 mph; 43.5 km/h) surfaced; 9 knots (10 mph; 17 km/h) submerged
- Range: Surfaced: 1,200 nmi (2,200 km) at full speed; 12,760 nmi (23,630 km) at 10 kn (19 km/h); Submerged: 8 nmi (15 km) at 8 kn (15 km/h); 30 nmi (56 km) at 4 kn (7.4 km/h)
- Test depth: 250 ft (76 m)
- Complement: 59 (6 officers and 53 ratings)
- Armament: 6 × 21 inch (533 mm) bow torpedo tubes; 4 × 18 inch (450 mm) beam torpedo tubes; 8 spare torpedoes; 3 × 4 in (100 mm) guns

HMS K26 was the only modified K-class submarine of Britain's Royal Navy to be completed. One of six ordered, she was laid down towards the end of the First World War but not completed until five years after its end.

Six boats, K23-K28 were ordered in June 1918 but the end of the war meant that only K26 was completed, the remainder all being cancelled on 26 November 1918. Even so, she was finished slowly. Although launched at Vickers yard in August 1919 she was towed to Chatham in 1920 and completed in June 1923.

She was a better design than the previous seventeen K-boats, experience with them having led to various changes. The swan bow was modified and the hydroplanes moved to operate in the wake of the propellers. All of this led to a reduction in speed of around 0.5 knots (0.9 km/h) on the surface compared to her predecessors.

She also had six 21 inch (533 mm) torpedo tubes in the bow instead of the four 18 inch (457 mm) ones of the earlier members of the class, which required her to be 12 feet (4 m) longer. The four 18 inch (457 mm) beam tubes were nevertheless retained. The superstructure was modified to improve the protection of the funnels and uptakes, and almost cured the unfortunate tendency of water entering down the funnels putting the boiler fires out in bad weather.

She also had capacity for 300 tons of fuel oil, instead of the 197 tons of the earlier boats which gave her a greater range even though her displacement was larger. Underwater endurance was similar to her predecessors. Improved ballast tank arrangements cut the diving time to 3 minutes 12 seconds to get to 80 feet (24 m). She also had an increased maximum diving depth of 250 feet (76 m).

In 1924 she embarked with much publicity on a long voyage via Gibraltar, Malta and the Suez Canal, to Colombo and Singapore and back again.

She was taken out of service in April 1931 because her displacement exceeded the limits for submarine displacement in the London Naval Treaty of 1930, and broken up shortly afterwards. She was the last steam-powered submarine built anywhere in the world until the first nuclear powered submarine, USS Nautilus was launched in 1954.

== Bibliography ==
- Campbell, N. J. M. (1980). "Great Britain (including Empire Forces)". In Chesneau, Roger (ed.). Conway's All the World's Fighting Ships 1922–1946. Greenwich, UK: Conway Maritime Press. pp. 2–85. ISBN 0-85177-146-7.
- Preston, Antony (1985). "Great Britain and Empire Forces". In Gray, Randal (ed.). Conway's All the World's Fighting Ships 1906–1921. Annapolis, Maryland: Naval Institute Press. pp. 1–104. ISBN 0-85177-245-5.
