= Submarine No.71 =

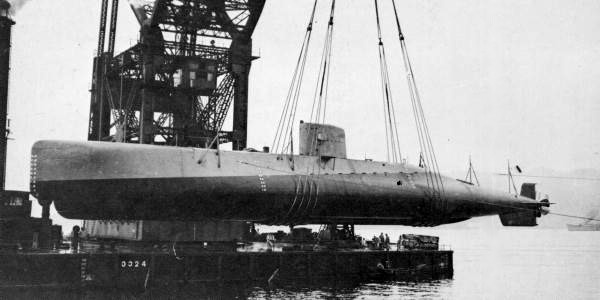
- Submarine No.71 in 1938

Class overview
- Name: Number 71
- Completed: 1
- Scrapped: 1

History

Empire of Japan
- Name: Number 71
- Builder: Kure Naval Arsenal
- Laid down: December 1937
- Launched: August 1938
- Commissioned: 1938
- Fate: Scrapped 1940

General characteristics
- Class & type: Experimental high-speed submarine
- Displacement: 216 tonnes (213 long tons) surfaced; 244 tonnes (240 long tons) submerged
- Length: 42.8 m (140 ft 5 in)
- Beam: 3.3 m (10 ft 10 in)
- Draft: 3.1 m (10 ft 2 in)
- Installed power: 1,200 bhp (890 kW) (diesel); 1,800 hp (1,300 kW) (electric motor)
- Propulsion: Diesel-electric; 1 × diesel engine; 1 × electric motor; One shaft
- Speed: 13.25 knots (24.54 km/h; 15.25 mph) surfaced; 21.25 knots (39.36 km/h; 24.45 mph) submerged
- Range: 3,830 nmi (7,090 km; 4,410 mi) at 12 knots (22 km/h; 14 mph) surfaced; 33 nmi (61 km; 38 mi) at 7 knots (13 km/h; 8.1 mph) submerged
- Test depth: 80 m (260 ft)
- Complement: 11
- Armament: 3 × bow 450 mm (17.7 in) torpedo tubes

Submarine No.71 (Number 71) was an experimental high-speed submarine built for the Imperial Japanese Navy (IJN) during the 1930s.

== Design and description ==
Submarine No.71 was designed to test high-speed performance underwater. Intended to reach 25 knots (46 km/h; 29 mph) underwater and 18 knots (33 km/h; 21 mph) on the surface, she proved to be too underpowered to reach those goals. Nonetheless, the boat was the fastest submarine in the world underwater when built, beating the previous record set by the similar World War I-era British R-class. She displaced 216 tonnes (213 long tons) surfaced and 244 tonnes (240 long tons) submerged. Submarine No.71 was 42.8 meters (140 ft 5 in) long, had a beam of 3.3 meters (10 ft 10 in) and a draft of 3.1 meters (10 ft 2 in).

For surface running, the boat was powered by a single 1,200-brake-horsepower (895 kW) diesel engine that drove one propeller shaft. When submerged the propeller was driven by a 1,800-horsepower (1,342 kW) electric motor. She could reach 13.25 knots (24.54 km/h; 15.25 mph) on the surface and 21.25 knots (39.36 km/h; 24.45 mph) underwater. On the surface, Submarine No.71 had a range of 3,830 nautical miles (7,090 km; 4,410 mi) at 12 knots (22 km/h; 14 mph); submerged, she had a range of 33 nmi (61 km; 38 mi) at 7 knots (13 km/h; 8.1 mph). The boat was armed with three internal bow 45 cm (17.7 in) torpedo tubes; each was provided with one torpedo.

== Construction and career ==
Submarine No.71 was laid down by the Kure Naval Arsenal in December 1937 and was launched that same month by being lowered into the water by a crane. She was completed in August 1938; trials showed that her small size and low-powered diesel made her hard to handle on the surface. While incapable of her intended speeds, she exceeded a submerged speed of 21 knots, almost five years before the famous German type XXI U-boats achieved speeds of around 18 knots (33 km/h; 21 mph). After extensive evaluations the boat was scrapped in 1940, and the lessons learned contributed to the development of the Sen Taka-class, and the Sen Taka Sho-class.

== See also ==
- German submarine V-80
- British R-class submarine
