= Bartholomew James =

English naval officer and writer

Rear-Admiral Bartholomew James
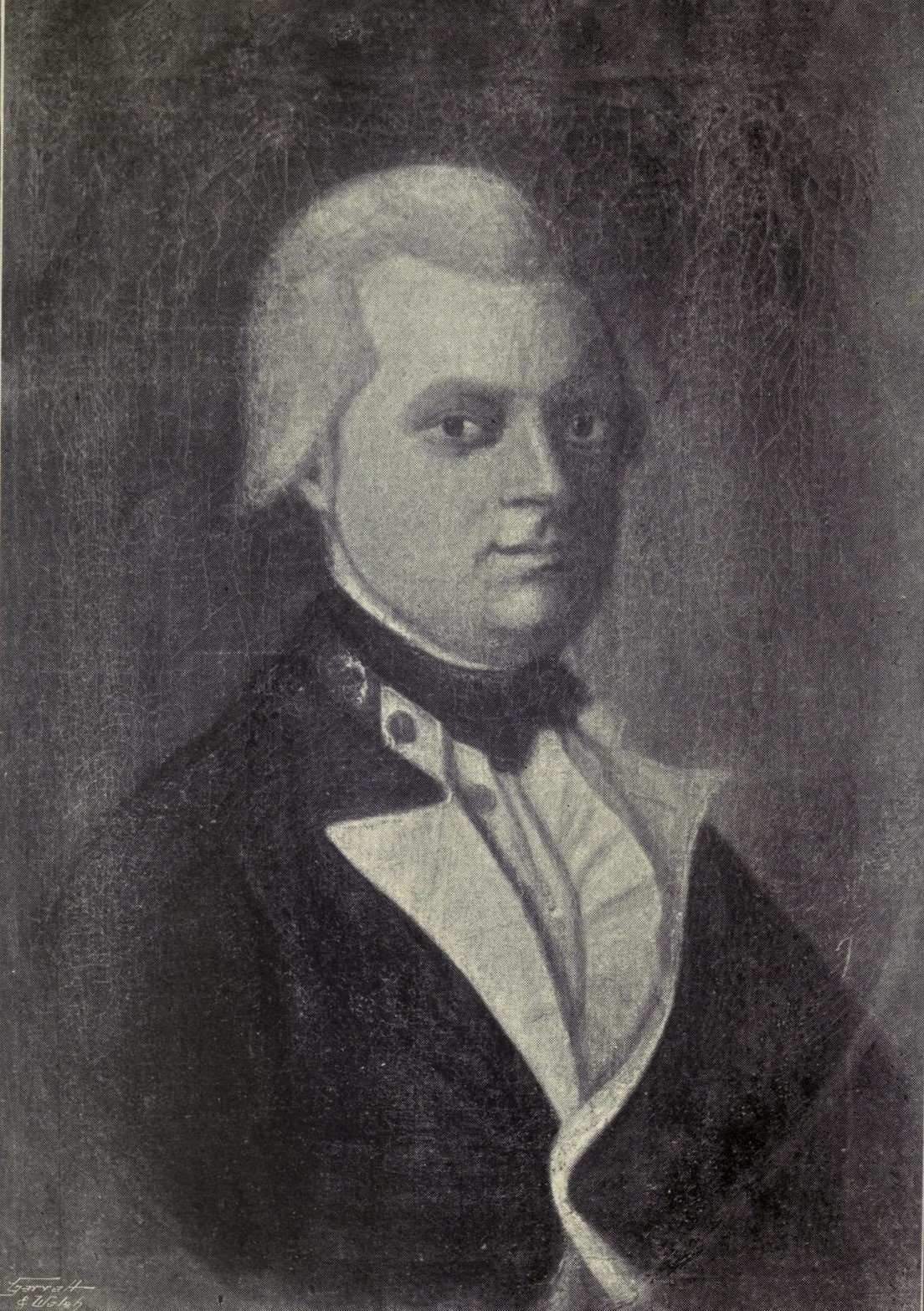
- Lieutenant James (c. 1787), reproduction from a painting by Joshua Reynolds
- Born: 28 December 1752; Falmouth, Cornwall
- Died: 1828 (aged 75); Falmouth, Cornwall
- Military career
- Allegiance: Kingdom of Great Britain
- Branch: Royal Navy
- Service years: 1765-1799
- Rank: Rear-Admiral
- Conflicts: American Revolutionary War; French Revolutionary Wars

Rear-Admiral Bartholomew James (1752 – 1828) was an English naval officer and writer.

== Life ==
Bartholomew James was born at Falmouth on 28 December 1752. In 1765 he was entered on board the Folkestone cutter, stationed at Bideford; in her, and afterwards in the West Indian and Lisbon packets, he remained till December 1770, when he was appointed to the Torbay at Plymouth, and in the following May to the Falcon sloop, going out to the West Indies. After an active commission he came home in the Falcon as acting lieutenant in August 1774; but his promotion not being confirmed he again entered on board the Folkestone, and in the following January on board the Wolf sloop at Penzance.

=== American Revolutionary War ===
In October 1775 he joined the Orpheus frigate, which sailed for North America on the 30th, and after a succession of heavy gales and snowstorms reached Halifax, dismasted and jury rigged, in ninety-seven days. In the Orpheus James took part in the reduction of New York; in September 1776 he was taken into the Chatham by Sir Peter Parker, whom in December he followed to the Bristol, and with whom, in January 1778, he sailed for Jamaica, where Sir Peter was to be commander-in-chief. On arriving on the station James was made acting lieutenant, and appointed to command the Chameleon, from which he was afterwards moved to the Dolphin. In both he was employed constantly cruising, till on 10 August he fell in with a squadron of French frigates, was captured, and sent into Cape François. After a disagreeable imprisonment of eight months he was exchanged and sent back to Port Royal, where the admiral presented him with a commission as lieutenant of the Porcupine sloop, one of the squadron, under Captain John Luttrell in the Charon, which, in October 1779, reduced the fort of Omoa in the Gulf of Honduras, (Note: Beatson, Naval and Military Memoirs, iv. 482.) and captured two galeons, with cargo and treasure valued at three million dollars. James was ordered to take one of the galeons to Jamaica, and was there appointed to the Charon, in which he sailed for England. A great part of the valuable cargo had been put on board the Leviathan, a worn-out ship of the line, doing duty as a store-ship, which foundered on the passage, 26 February 1780. When she was seen to be in difficulties, James, with a party of seamen, was sent to help her, but nothing could be done; the sea was too high to permit of any trans-shipment of the cargo, and he had the mortification of seeing his prize-money go with her to the bottom.

In June Captain Luttrell was superseded in command of the Charon by Captain Thomas Symonds, and the ship sailed from Spithead in the beginning of August. At Cork she joined the Bienfaisant and two frigates, which put to sea on the 12th with a convoy of a hundred victuallers for North America. On the 13th they fell in with and captured the Comte d'Artois of 64 guns; (Note: see John MacBride) after which the Charon took sole charge of the convoy, and arrived at Charleston on 14 October. During the next year she was engaged in active cruising on the coast; in September 1781 she was shut up in the York River, and after assisting in the defence of Yorktown, was destroyed by the enemy with red-hot shot. When Lord Cornwallis surrendered, James, with the other officers of the Charon, became a prisoner; he was sent to England on parole, and in March 1782 was exchanged. In June he was appointed to the Aurora frigate, and being in her at Spithead on 29 August, when the Royal George foundered, was in command of the Aurora's boats helping to pick up the survivors.

=== French Revolutionary Wars ===
In May 1783 the Aurora was paid off, and James, with no prospect of employment and with a young family to provide for, engaged in business as a brewer. The brewery, however, proved a failure, and James retired from it in September 1785, embarrassed by a heavy load of debt, the clearing off of which totally exhausted his little property. After much anxiety he obtained command of a merchant ship, and continued engaged, principally in the West Indian trade, till March 1793, when, on news of the war with France reaching him at Jamaica, he fitted out a small tender of forty tons with fifteen men armed with cutlasses, and with the sanction of the senior officer went out to warn merchant ships outward bound. Incidentally he made some small prizes, which, however, were condemned as Droits of Admiralty. On another voyage he had better success, but only enough to cover his expenses; and in the summer he returned to England, where his ship was taken up by government as a transport for the expedition to the West Indies, and he himself appointed a transport agent. (Note: see John Jervis, 1st Earl of St Vincent) The transports arrived at Barbadoes on 10 January 1794, and after a month's drill and exercise in landing and re-embarking moved on to Martinique, the reduction of which was completed by 25 March. During this time James was constantly employed in fatigue duty on shore, making roads, cutting fascines, or dragging guns into position. The seamen of the transports objected to this duty, as bringing them into a danger for which they had not shipped, and on one occasion wrote to the admiral complaining that they were needlessly exposed. The admiral mentioned the complaint to James, who next day, as his men were crossing an open space, halted them for a breathing spell, and questioned them on the subject. The French opened a sharp fire on them, and the men were anxious to move on; but James refused to stir till they had denied all knowledge of the complaint. (Note: Tucker, Memoirs of Earl St. Vincent, i. 114 n.) On 28 March, three days after the surrender of the last fort, James was appointed agent for the sale of the produce of the island, Jervis promising to take him in his flagship as soon as there was a vacancy.

In six weeks the agency brought him in about 3,000l., and on 13 May he was appointed to the Boyne. On 14 October he was landed in command of a party of seamen to strengthen the garrison of Fort Mathilde of Guadaloupe, and continued on that duty till 19 November, when he rejoined the Boyne, and in her returned to England. Jervis struck his flag shortly after arriving at Spithead, but the ship was ordered to refit for service. On 1 May 1795, while the marines were firing from the poop, the ship caught fire on the Spit and blew up. With a few exceptions all the men were saved.

After the court-martial on 18 May he was appointed to the Commerce de Marseille, and in September to the Victory, then in the Mediterranean, as part of the following of Sir John Jervis, going out as commander-in-chief. He went out with Sir John in the Lively frigate, and on 8 June 1796 was promoted to the rank of commander. For six weeks he was acting captain of the Mignonne on the coast of Corsica; he was then appointed to the Peterel, in which in August he took the merchants of the British factory at Leghorn to Naples, where on 12 August, the Prince of Wales's birthday, he entertained Prince Augustus (afterwards Duke of Sussex), Sir William Hamilton, and "his beautiful lady" at dinner.

The Petrel after this went up the Adriatic, and back to Elba, where James was superseded, and appointed by Commodore Nelson to the Dromedary store-ship, in which he took Commissioner Coffin and the officers of the yard at Elba down the Mediterranean, with orders to carry them to Lisbon, in company with the Southampton frigate. On 11 February 1797, in passing through the Gut, they were chased by the Spanish fleet, which they counted as numbering twenty-seven sail of the line, and were thus, on joining the admiral on the 13th, able to give him exact information. The Dromedary was ordered to proceed at once to the Tagus, where James was moved into the Corso brig of 24 guns, with a nominal complement of 121 men, but having actually only thirty-nine besides officers. On 23 March he sailed from Lisbon, with orders to cruise off Teneriffe as long as his water and provisions lasted. Within a few days after getting on his station he was chased by an enemy's squadron, from which he escaped only by throwing overboard most of his guns, his provisions, his ballast, and starting his water; but he managed to remain out for three months, and on rejoining the admiral off Cadiz was sent back under similar orders, with a few guns supplied from the fleet, and some men, naturally of the worst character: foreigners or mutineers from the Channel fleet. After a singularly adventurous cruise, he returned to Gibraltar in the end of October. In November the Corso was sent to England with despatches, and on rejoining the fleet in January 1798 was employed in cruising and the protection of trade on the coasts of Spain and Africa as far as Tunis.

=== Retirement and death ===
On 24 October James was posted to the Canopus, one of the prizes from the Nile, and, refitting her at Lisbon, took her home towards the end of 1799. This was the end of his sea service. On the renewal of the war in 1803 he had command for some time of the sea fencibles on the coast of Cornwall; but for the rest of his life he resided in simple retirement near Falmouth, and died in 1827, preserving to the last his high spirits and genial temper. He married Henrietta Pender of Falmouth, and left issue two daughters, of whom the younger, Henrietta, married in 1808 Admiral Thomas Ball Sulivan.

James's journal deals with minor incidents illustrating life in the navy through the latter half of the eighteenth century. It was preserved by the family to W. H. G. Kingston, who made it the groundwork of his carelessly constructed story of sea-adventure entitled Hurricane Hurry.

== Sources ==
- Journal of Rear-Admiral Bartholomew James 1752–1828, edited by J. K. Laughton with J. Y. F. Sulivan (Navy Records Society), 1896.
