= Canopus (disambiguation) =

Canopus (or Alpha Carinae) is the brightest star in the southern constellation of Carina.

Canopus may also refer to:

- Canopus (insect), Neotropical bug genus
- Canopus (mythology), in Homeric myth, the pilot of King Menelaus's ship
- Canopus (nuclear test) was the name given to the first test of the French hydrogen bomb, in 1968, with a yield of 2.8 megatons
- Canopus (Thrace), a town of ancient Thrace, a suburb of Byzantium
- Canopus, Egypt, an ancient Egyptian city near modern-day Abu Qir, in the Nile Delta
- Canopus 2, an Argentine sounding rocket
- Canopus Corporation, a manufacturer of video editing cards and video editing software
- Canopus G-ADHL, a Short Empire flying boat
- Canopus in Argos, a series of space fiction by Doris Lessing
- Canopic jar, ancient Egyptian vessel for storing organs removed by mummification procedure
- Canopus Lake, a lake in Clarence Fahnestock State Park in New York State, USA
- HMS Canopus, two ships of the Royal Navy
- USS Canopus, three ships of the United States Navy
