= HMS Sesame (1918) =

Royal Navy S class destroyer

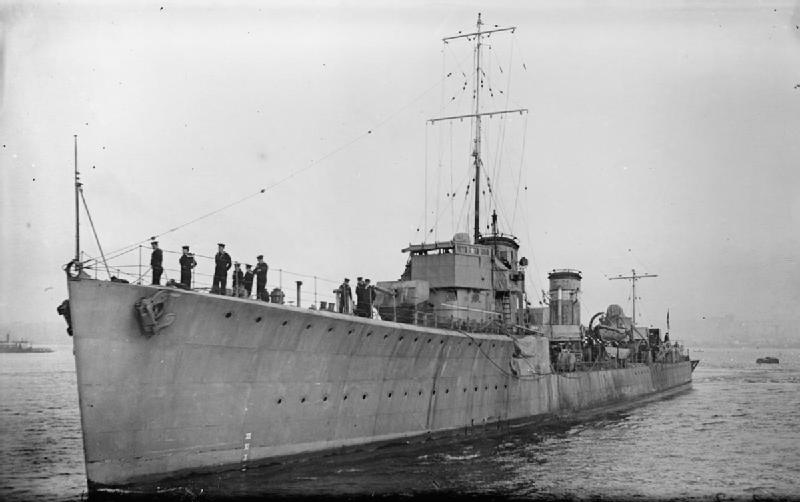
- Sister ship Serene in 1919

History

United Kingdom
- Name: HMS Sesame
- Ordered: June 1917
- Builder: William Denny and Brothers, Dumbarton
- Yard number: 1103
- Laid down: 2 February 1918
- Launched: 30 November 1918
- Completed: 11 April 1919
- Out of service: 14 September 1936
- Fate: Sold to be broken up

General characteristics
- Class & type: S-class destroyer
- Displacement: 1,075 long tons (1,092 t) normal; 1,221 long tons (1,241 t) deep load
- Length: 265 ft (80.8 m) p.p.
- Beam: 26 ft 8 in (8.13 m)
- Draught: 9 ft 10 in (3.00 m) mean
- Propulsion: 3 Yarrow boilers; 2 geared Brown-Curtis steam turbines, 27,000 shp
- Speed: 36 knots (41.4 mph; 66.7 km/h)
- Range: 2,750 nmi (5,090 km) at 15 kn (28 km/h)
- Complement: 90
- Armament: 3 × QF 4-inch (101.6 mm) Mark IV guns, mounting P Mk. IX; 1 × single 2-pounder (40-mm) "pom-pom" Mk. II anti-aircraft gun; 4 × 21 in (533 mm) torpedo tubes (2×2)

HMS Sesame was an S-class destroyer, which served with the Royal Navy in the twentieth century. Launched on 30 November 1918 just after the end of the First World War, the ship was commissioned into the Reserve Fleet. A year later, the destroyer was sent to Latvia in support of the country's call for independence, arriving just at the cessation of that county's war of independence. Returning to the United Kingdom, Sesame was later equipped to act as a plane guard within the Home Fleet, with all armament removed and a davit fitted to rescue aircraft. The vessel remained in that configuration for a short time, but the London Naval Treaty sounded the death knell for the ship as it limited the destroyer tonnage that the Royal Navy could operate. As newer and more powerful destroyers entered service, Sesame was one of those retired, being sold to be broken up on 4 May 1934.

== Design and development ==
Sesame was one of thirty-three Admiralty S class destroyers ordered by the British Admiralty in June 1917 as part of the Twelfth War Construction Programme. The design was a development of the R class introduced as a cheaper and faster alternative to the V and W class.

Sesame had a overall length of 276 ft (84 m) and a length of 265 ft (81 m) between perpendiculars. Beam was 26 ft 8 in (8.13 m) and draught 9 ft 10 in (3.00 m). Displacement was 1,075 long tons (1,092 t) normal and 1,221 long tons (1,241 t) deep load. Three Yarrow boilers fed steam to two sets of Brown-Curtis geared steam turbines rated at 27,000 shaft horsepower (20,000 kW) and driving two shafts, giving a design speed of 36 knots (67 km/h; 41 mph) at normal loading and 32.5 knots (60.2 km/h; 37.4 mph) at deep load. The destroyer was the only one of the class equipped with Brown-Curtis turbines built by John Brown & Company. Two funnels were fitted. A full load of 301 long tons (306 t) of fuel oil was carried, which gave a design range of 2,750 nautical miles (5,090 km; 3,160 mi) at 15 knots (28 km/h; 17 mph).

Armament consisted of three QF 4-inch (102 mm) Mk IV guns on the ship's centreline. One was mounted raised on the forecastle, one on a platform between the funnels and one aft. The ship also mounted a single 40-millimetre (1.6 in) 2-pounder pom-pom anti-aircraft gun for air defence. Four 21-inch (533 mm) torpedo tubes were fitted in two twin rotating mounts aft. The ship was designed to mount two additional 18-inch (457 mm) torpedo tubes either side of the superstructure but this required the forecastle plating to be cut away, making the vessel very wet, so they were removed. The weight saved enabled the heavier Mark V 21-inch torpedo to be carried. Fire control included a single Dumaresq and a Vickers range clock. The ship had a complement of 90 officers and ratings.

== Construction and career ==
Laid down on 2 February 1918 by William Denny and Brothers in Dumbarton with the yard number 1103, Sesame was launched on 30 December, soon after the Armistice which ended the First World War. The vessel was the first one that served in the Royal Navy to be named Sesame. Sesame was completed on 28 March the following year and commissioned into the Reserve Fleet at Devonport.

Sesame remained in reserve until the following year. Although the war on the western front had finished, the escalating civil war in Russia continued. The United Kingdom decided to send units of the Royal Navy into the Baltic Sea to monitor the situation. Soon into the campaign, it became clear that the Russians were planning to liberate the Baltic State of Latvia by integrating it into the new Soviet Union. The fleet was therefore tasked with not simply helping to help organise the evacuation of German forces from the country but also support their war of independence. This was achieved on 14 November 1919. Five days later, the destroyer arrived in Liepāja along with sister ships Serene, Shamrock, Strenuous and Torbay in time to see peace restored. The destroyer returned to the United Kingdom and was once again reduced to reserve at Devonport on 18 September 1920.

In February 1929, Sesame left the Irish destroyer Flotilla, reducing the flotilla's strength from three to two ships, and went into reserve at Devonport. In March that year, the destroyer was ordered to recommission for attachment to the Fleet Target Service and to the aircraft carrier Argus. The ship was equipped with a davit and acted as a plane guard for the aircraft carriers of the Home Fleet. All other armament was removed. However, the end was in sight for the warship. On 22 April 1930, the United Kingdom signed the London Naval Treaty, which limited the total destroyer tonnage that the navy could operate. As newer, larger and more powerful vessels were introduced, older destroyers like the S class were gradually retired.

On 1 November 1930, during a demonstration by the Atlantic Fleet to delegates to the 1930 Imperial Conference, Sesame rescued the three-man crew of a Fairey IIIF aircraft that had crashed while taking off from the carrier Courageous. Sesame remained in service until 4 May 1934 when the vessel was sold to Cashmore of Newport, Wales, and subsequently broken up.

== Pennant numbers ==
Pennant numbers
Pennant number	Date
F5A	April 1919
D98	November 1919
F63	December 1920
H35	January 1922
