= HMS Shamrock (1918) =

Royal Navy S class destroyer

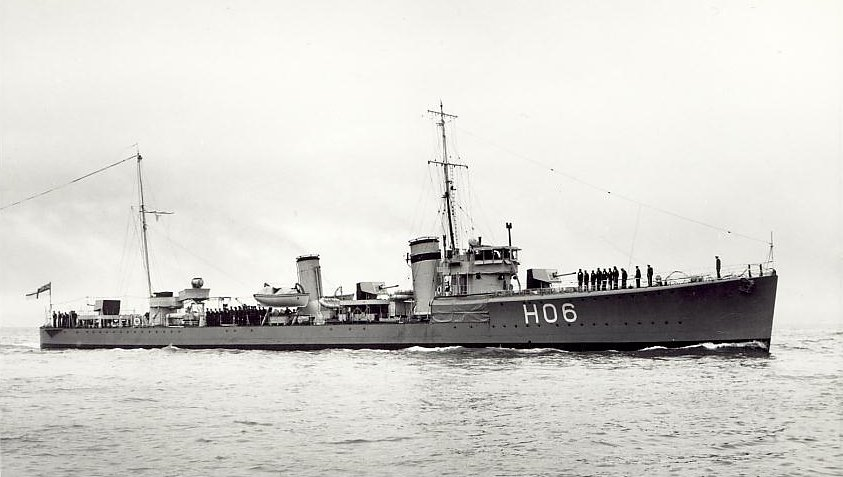
- Shamrock

History

United Kingdom
- Name: Shamrock
- Ordered: June 1917
- Builder: Doxford, Sunderland
- Laid down: November 1917
- Launched: 26 August 1918
- Completed: 28 March 1919
- Out of service: 23 November 1936
- Fate: Sold to be broken up

General characteristics
- Class & type: S-class destroyer
- Displacement: 1,075 long tons (1,092 t) normal; 1,221 long tons (1,241 t) deep load
- Length: 265 ft (80.8 m) p.p.
- Beam: 26 ft 8 in (8.13 m)
- Draught: 9 ft 10 in (3.00 m) mean
- Propulsion: 3 Yarrow boilers; 2 geared Brown-Curtis steam turbines, 27,000 shp
- Speed: 36 knots (41.4 mph; 66.7 km/h)
- Range: 2,750 nmi (5,090 km) at 15 kn (28 km/h)
- Complement: 90
- Armament: 3 × QF 4-inch (101.6 mm) Mark IV guns, mounting P Mk. IX; 1 × single 2-pounder (40-mm) "pom-pom" Mk. II anti-aircraft gun; 4 × 21 in (533 mm) torpedo tubes (2×2)

HMS Shamrock was an S-class destroyer, which served with the Royal Navy in the twentieth century. Launched on 26 August 1918 just before the end of the First World War, the ship was commissioned into the Home Fleet. A year later, the destroyer was sent to the Baltic Sea during the Russian Civil War to support Latvia, arriving just at the cessation of that country's war of independence. The vessel was later sent to join the Local Defence Flotilla at Gibraltar. It was while serving there that the destroyer escorted the first Prime Minister of Republican Spain, Niceto Alcalá-Zamora, on an official visit to Spanish Morocco and helped evacuate civilians from Málaga at the start of the Spanish Civil War. Shamrock was retired soon after and sold to be broken up on 23 November 1936.

== Design and development ==
Shamrock was one of thirty-three Admiralty S class destroyers ordered by the British Admiralty in June 1917 as part of the Twelfth War Construction Programme. The design was a development of the R class introduced at the same time as, and as a cheaper and faster complement to, the V and W class.

Shamrock had a overall length of 276 ft (84 m) and a length of 265 ft (81 m) between perpendiculars. Beam was 26 ft 8 in (8.13 m) and draught 9 ft 10 in (3.00 m). Displacement was 1,075 long tons (1,092 t) normal and 1,221 long tons (1,241 t) deep load. Three Yarrow boilers fed steam to two sets of Brown-Curtis geared steam turbines rated at 27,000 shaft horsepower (20,000 kW) and driving two shafts, giving a design speed of 36 knots (67 km/h; 41 mph) at normal loading and 32.5 knots (60.2 km/h; 37.4 mph) at deep load. wo funnels were fitted. A full load of 301 long tons (306 t) of fuel oil was carried, which gave a design range of 2,750 nautical miles (5,090 km; 3,160 mi) at 15 knots (28 km/h; 17 mph).

Armament consisted of three QF 4-inch (102 mm) Mk IV guns on the ship's centreline. One was mounted raised on the forecastle, one on a platform between the funnels and one aft. The ship also mounted a single 40-millimetre (1.6 in) 2-pounder pom-pom anti-aircraft gun for air defence. Four 21-inch (533 mm) torpedo tubes were fitted in two twin rotating mounts aft. The ship was designed to mount two additional 18-inch (457 mm) torpedo tubes either side of the superstructure but this required the forecastle plating to be cut away, making the vessel very wet, so they were removed. The weight saved enabled the heavier Mark V 21-inch torpedo to be carried. The ship had a complement of 90 officers and ratings.

== Construction and career ==
Laid down in November 1917 by William Doxford & Sons at their dockyard in Sunderland, Shamrock was launched on 26 August the following year, shortly before the Armistice which ended the First World War. and was completed on 28 March 1919. The vessel was the fourth that served in the Royal Navy to bear the name. Shamrock was commissioned into the Fourth Destroyer Flotilla of the Home Fleet.

Although the war on the western front had finished, the escalating civil war in Russia continued. The United Kingdom decided to send units of the Royal Navy into the Baltic Sea to monitor the situation and to protect British interests. Soon into the campaign, it became clear that the Russians were planning to liberate the Baltic State of Latvia by integrating it into the new Soviet Union. The fleet was therefore tasked with not simply helping to help organise the evacuation of German forces from the country but also support their war of independence. This was achieved on 14 November 1919. Five days later, the destroyer arrived in Liepāja along with sister ships Serene, Sesame, Strenuous and Torbay in time to see peace restored.

On 2 May 1924, Shamrock was guard ship for the Racer while the diving support vessel recovered over 100 gold bars from the wreck of the Laurentic. The destroyer was subsequently deployed to Gibraltar. From there, the destroyer visited Seville during the declaration of the Second Spanish Republic. The crew witnessed rioting on the streets but were uninjured, returning to Gibraltar on 17 April. Between 5 and 30 April 1933, the destroyer, along with sister ship Searcher, visited Morocco and Spain, calling in at Casablanca, Cádiz, Bonanza and Tangier, as well as revisiting Seville. On 31 October, the ship escorted the first Prime Minister of Republican Spain, Niceto Alcalá-Zamora, on an official visit to the Spanish protectorate in Morocco.

On 1 February 1934, Shamrock was recommissioned and rejoined the Local Defence Flotilla at Gibraltar. The destroyer undertook another cruise between 6 and 30 April that year, visiting Huelva and Ceuta, as well as returning to Seville and Tangier. In 1936, with tensions escalating in Spain, Shamrock, was joined by five other destroyers and three cruisers, just before the start of the Spanish Civil War. The destroyer was involved in evacuating British, French and American citizens from Málaga, and then other smaller settlements. On 22 July, while undertaking these duties, the ship was bombed by Nationalist aircraft, but remained unharmed. Soon after, Shamrock was taken out of service. The destroyer was chosen as one of twenty-two destroyers given to Thos. W. Ward of Sheffield in exchange for the liner RMS Majestic. In consequence, on 23 November 1936, the ship was handed over to be broken up at Milford Haven.

== Pennant numbers ==
Pennant numbers
Pennant number	Date
F50	August 1919
D94	November 1919
H06	January 1922
