= HMS Serene (1918) =

Royal Navy S class destroyer

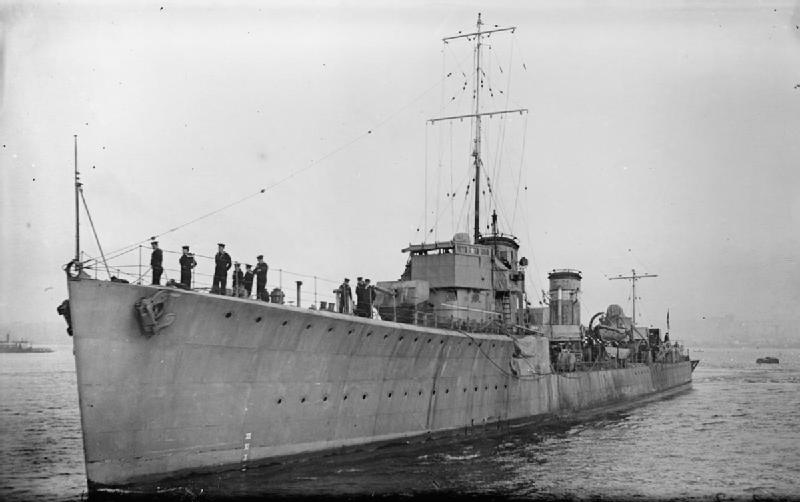
- HMS Serene in 1919

History

United Kingdom
- Name: HMS Serene
- Ordered: June 1917
- Builder: Denny, Dumbarton
- Yard number: 1102
- Laid down: 2 February 1918
- Launched: 30 November 1918
- Completed: 11 April 1919
- Out of service: 14 September 1936
- Fate: Sold to be broken up

General characteristics
- Class & type: S-class destroyer
- Displacement: 1,075 long tons (1,092 t) normal; 1,221 long tons (1,241 t) deep load
- Length: 265 ft (80.8 m) p.p.
- Beam: 26 ft 8 in (8.13 m)
- Draught: 9 ft 10 in (3.00 m) mean
- Propulsion: 3 Yarrow boilers; 2 geared Brown-Curtis steam turbines, 27,000 shp
- Speed: 36 knots (41.4 mph; 66.7 km/h)
- Range: 2,750 nmi (5,090 km) at 15 kn (28 km/h)
- Complement: 90
- Armament: 3 × QF 4-inch (101.6 mm) Mark IV guns, mounting P Mk. IX; 1 × single 2-pounder (40-mm) "pom-pom" Mk. II anti-aircraft gun; 4 × 21 in (533 mm) torpedo tubes (2×2)

HMS Serene was an S-class destroyer, which served with the Royal Navy. Launched on 30 November 1918 just after the end of the First World War, the ship was commissioned into the Reserve Fleet. Excluding a brief expedition to Latvia near to the end of that nation's War of Independence in 1919, the destroyer remained in reserve at Devonport until 1936. During this period, the condition of the destroyer deteriorated. Then, as part of a deal for the liner Majestic, Serene was sold to be broken up on 14 September.

== Design and development ==
Serene was one of thirty-three Admiralty S class destroyers ordered by the British Admiralty in June 1917 as part of the Twelfth War Construction Programme. The design was a development of the R class introduced as a cheaper and faster alternative to the V and W class. Differences with the R class were minor, such as having the searchlight moved aft.

Serene had a overall length of 276 ft (84 m) and a length of 265 ft (81 m) between perpendiculars. Beam was 26 ft 8 in (8.13 m) and draught 9 ft 10 in (3.00 m). Displacement was 1,075 long tons (1,092 t) normal and 1,221 long tons (1,241 t) deep load. Three Yarrow boilers fed steam to two sets of Brown-Curtis geared steam turbines rated at 27,000 shaft horsepower (20,000 kW) and driving two shafts, giving a design speed of 36 knots (67 km/h; 41 mph) at normal loading and 32.5 knots (60.2 km/h; 37.4 mph) at deep load. Two funnels were fitted. A full load of 301 long tons (306 t) of fuel oil was carried, which gave a design range of 2,750 nautical miles (5,090 km; 3,160 mi) at 15 knots (28 km/h; 17 mph).

Armament consisted of three QF 4-inch (102 mm) Mk IV guns on the ship's centreline. One was mounted raised on the forecastle, one on a platform between the funnels and one aft. The ship also mounted a single 40-millimetre (1.6 in) 2-pounder pom-pom anti-aircraft gun for air defence. Four 21-inch (533 mm) torpedo tubes were fitted in two twin rotating mounts aft. The ship was designed to mount two additional 18-inch (457 mm) torpedo tubes either side of the superstructure but this required the forecastle plating to be cut away, making the vessel very wet, so they were removed. The weight saved enabled the heavier Mark V 21-inch torpedo to be carried. The ship had a complement of 90 officers and ratings.

== Construction and career ==
Laid down on 2 February 1918 by William Denny and Brothers in Dumbarton with the yard number 1102, Serene was launched on 30 November, shortly after the Armistice which ended the First World War. The vessel was the first that served in the Royal Navy to be named Serene. Serene was completed on 30 April the following year and commissioned into the Reserve Fleet at Devonport.

Serene remained in reserve until the following year. Although the war had finished, the escalating civil war in Russia continued. The United Kingdom decided to send units of the Royal Navy into the Baltic Sea to monitor the situation. Soon into the campaign, it became clear that the Russians were planning to liberate the Baltic State of Latvia by integrating it into the new Soviet Union. The fleet was therefore tasked with not simply helping to help organise the evacuation of German forces from the country but also support their War of Independence. This was achieved on 14 November 1919. Five days later, the destroyer arrived in Liepāja along with sister ships Sesame, Shamrock, Strenuous and Torbay in time to see peace restored.

The destroyer returned to the United Kingdom and was once again reduced to reserve at Devonport on 15 September 1920. Like many of the class stored in reserve, the ship deteriorated and by the middle of the next decade was considered by the Admiralty to be in too poor condition to return to operations. Serene remained in reserve until 14 September 1936 when the ship was given to Thos. W. Ward of Sheffield in exchange for the liner Majestic. The destroyer was subsequently broken up at Inverkeithing.

== Pennant numbers ==
Pennant number	Date
F51	January 1919
F7A	May 1919
H25	January 1922
