= Mignonette =

Mignonette may refer to:

== Plants ==
- Mignonette or Reseda (plant), a genus of fragrant herbaceous plants
- Cultivars of butterhead-type lettuce (Lactuca sativa var. capitata), such as 'Green mignonette' and 'Red mignonette'
- Mignonette tree, also called henna
- Mignonette vine, Anredera cordifolia

== Art, entertainment, and media ==
- Amelia Mignonette Grimaldi Thermopolis Renaldo, a character in The Princess Diaries
- Mignonette (album), a 2004 folk album by The Avett Brothers
- Mignonette Kokin (1880–1957), vaudeville dancer and comedian
- Mignonette, an 1874 comic opera by Blanche Reeves and Jesse Williams commissioned by Alice Oates

== In cooking ==
- Mignonette or poivre mignonette, roughly cracked or coarsely ground peppercorns in French cuisine, used for au poivre preparations and in bouquet garni
- Mignonette sauce, a sauce of vinegar and shallots, typically used for oysters

== Ships ==
- Mignonette (yacht), built 1867, shipwrecked in 1884; cannibalism as a necessity defence for murdering crewmember Richard Parker was struck down by R v Dudley and Stephens to set an enduring legal precedent
- HMS Mignonette, more than one ship of the British Royal Navy
- USS Mignonette (1861), a steam operated tugboat

== Other uses ==
- Mignonette (locomotive), a locomotive of the Great Western Railway
- Mignonette, a type of nineteenth century lace made in Arras
- Réséda, Mignonette day in the French Republican Calendar
