= Acajutla =

Acajutla Acaxutla
- City
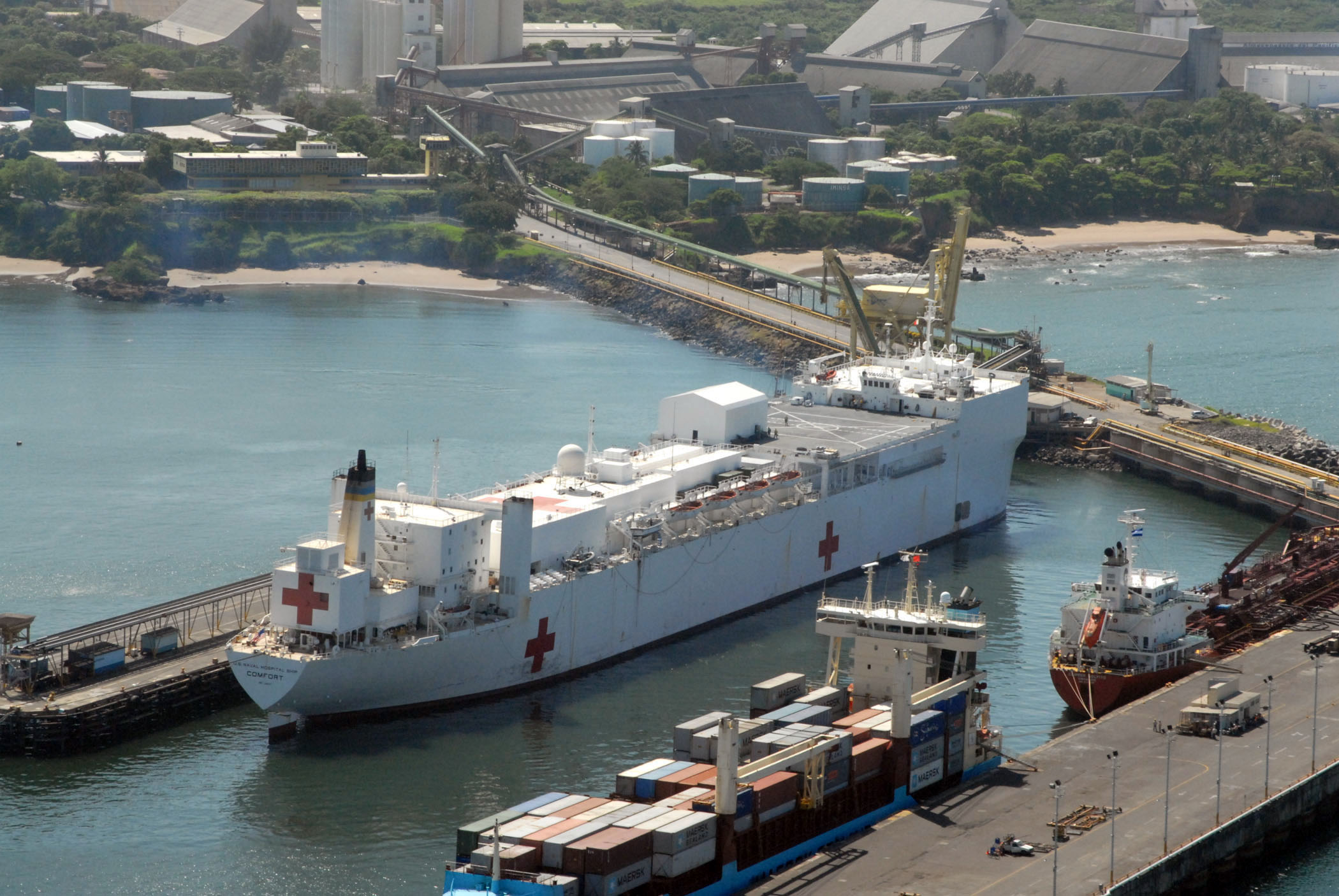

- Location in El Salvador
- Coordinates: 13°35′24″N 89°50′01″W
- Country: El Salvador
- Department: Sonsonate Department

Area
  - Total: 166.59 km^{2} (64.32 sq mi)
- Elevation: 24 m (79 ft)

Population (2012)
  - Total: 29,701
  - Density: 178.29/km^{2} (461.76/sq mi)
- Time zone: UTC-06:00 (CST)

Acajutla is a seaport city in Sonsonate Department, El Salvador. The city is located at 13°35′24″N 89°50′01″W on the Pacific coast of Central America and is El Salvador's principal seaport from which a large portion of the nation's exports of coffee, sugar, and Balsam of Peru are shipped. As a city, Acajutla is one of seventeen such districts in Sonsonate. As of 1992, the population of the city was 18,008.

== History ==
Pedro de Alvarado, a Spanish conquistador under the command of Hernán Cortés, had conquered Mexico and Guatemala before coming to the vicinity of Acajutla. There, he met heavy resistance but defeated the indigenous people in 1524 and conquered all of present-day El Salvador at the Battle of Acajutla.

Following the complete independence of El Salvador in 1838, the economy of the nation became increasingly dependent on the export of coffee. The rapid growth of this lucrative "cash crop" led to profound socio-economic changes in the region, and drew of the attention of foreign investors and the local plantation owners to Acajutla, where infrastructure development was seen as necessary to assure the transport of crops from the interior and the ability to load them efficiently aboard ships.

During the 1932 Salvadoran peasant uprising, two destroyers of the Royal Canadian Navy, HMCS Skeena and HMCS Vancouver anchored off the shore of Acajutla at the request of the British Consul in El Salvador who feared for the safety of British nationals and assets. Armed Canadian sailors briefly landed against the wishes of the Salvadoran government and began preparing to continue on to San Salvador before the situation improved and the British no longer deemed an armed Canadian presence necessary.

During the twelve-year Salvadoran civil war (1980–1992), the oil refinery at Acajutla (then the only operating refinery in El Salvador), was a target for anti-government rebels.

== Acajutla Port ==
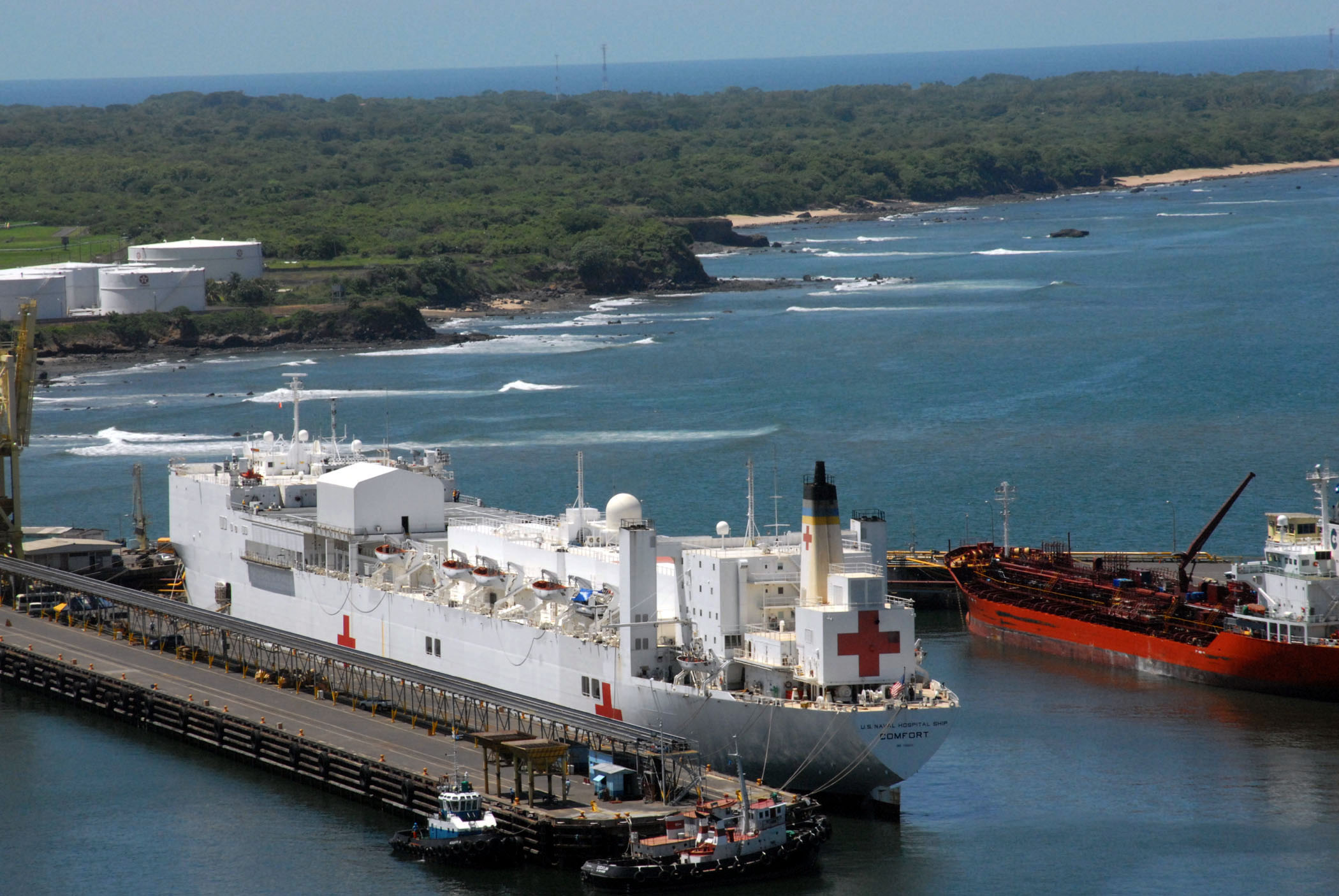
USNS Comfort in Acajutla, El Salvador

The port of Acajutla was built in its initial phase at a cost of 25 million colones. The wave breaker of 338 meters inaugurated its operations in August 1961, and is managed by the Executive Commission of Autonomous Port (CEPA).

== Geography ==
The city is located at 13°35′24″N 89°50′01″W on the Pacific coast of Central America and is El Salvador's principal seaport.

=== Climate ===
As with all the Pacific coast of Central America, the climate at Acajutla is continuously hot and humid. Daytime high temperatures are usually in the 32 to 34 °C (89.6 to 93.2 °F) range. The Köppen climate classification subtype for this climate is Aw (tropical savanna climate).

Climate data for Acajutla (1991–2020, extremes 1954–present)
Month	Jan	Feb	Mar	Apr	May	Jun	Jul	Aug	Sep	Oct	Nov	Dec	Year
Record high °C (°F)	38.5 (101.3)	39.5 (103.1)	40.2 (104.4)	39.3 (102.7)	39.3 (102.7)	38.2 (100.8)	38.1 (100.6)	38.0 (100.4)	36.5 (97.7)	38.5 (101.3)	38.4 (101.1)	38.8 (101.8)	40.2 (104.4)
Mean daily maximum °C (°F)	32.7 (90.9)	33.0 (91.4)	33.7 (92.7)	34.0 (93.2)	33.5 (92.3)	33.1 (91.6)	33.3 (91.9)	33.3 (91.9)	32.5 (90.5)	32.2 (90.0)	33.0 (91.4)	32.8 (91.0)	33.1 (91.6)
Daily mean °C (°F)	27.3 (81.1)	27.7 (81.9)	28.4 (83.1)	29.2 (84.6)	29.0 (84.2)	28.3 (82.9)	28.3 (82.9)	28.2 (82.8)	27.7 (81.9)	27.5 (81.5)	27.9 (82.2)	27.5 (81.5)	28.1 (82.6)
Mean daily minimum °C (°F)	23.2 (73.8)	23.8 (74.8)	24.6 (76.3)	25.4 (77.7)	25.2 (77.4)	24.5 (76.1)	24.0 (75.2)	24.0 (75.2)	24.0 (75.2)	23.9 (75.0)	23.8 (74.8)	23.4 (74.1)	24.1 (75.4)
Record low °C (°F)	17.2 (63.0)	16.1 (61.0)	17.8 (64.0)	17.4 (63.3)	18.9 (66.0)	19.5 (67.1)	18.2 (64.8)	16.6 (61.9)	17.8 (64.0)	17.0 (62.6)	15.6 (60.1)	16.9 (62.4)	15.6 (60.1)
Average precipitation mm (inches)	0.6 (0.02)	1.8 (0.07)	8.0 (0.31)	45.6 (1.80)	171.2 (6.74)	302.8 (11.92)	286.0 (11.26)	255.2 (10.05)	331.4 (13.05)	271.9 (10.70)	60.2 (2.37)	6.2 (0.24)	1,741 (68.54)
Average precipitation days (≥ 1.0 mm)	0.2	0.3	0.9	3.2	9.3	12.7	14.6	15.2	15.0	11.3	3.1	0.7	86.5
Average relative humidity (%)	67	67	69	72	77	79	77	78	81	81	71	68	73.9
Mean monthly sunshine hours	303.8	285.3	300.7	261.0	248.0	204.0	260.4	263.5	207.0	235.6	273.0	303.8	3,146.1
Mean daily sunshine hours	9.8	10.1	9.7	8.7	8.0	6.8	8.4	8.5	6.9	7.6	9.1	9.8	8.6
Source 1: Ministerio de Medio Ambiente y Recursos Naturales
Source 2: Deutscher Wetterdienst (sun 1954–1966), Meteo Climat (record highs and lows)

== Commerce ==
Acajutla's deepwater harbor is the principal port, and for some types of shipping, there are two operational ports in El Salvador. Its port cargo loading facilities allow the marine shipment of a large portion of its major exports of coffee (40%), sugar, and Balsam of Peru. Its oil refinery is the nation's largest and it mainly refines petroleum imported from Venezuela.

== Events ==
They celebrate their traditional parties between the last days of May and 2 June as the main day.

One of the most important celebration is made between March and April when they celebrate the passion of Christ. In that day, people clean the roads and create decoratives images in the sand they bring from the beach, and at noon they begin the simulation of the passion from San Francisco de Asis church near Barrio La playa ending in the same location the next day in the early hours of the day.

On 24 October they make celebrations of the fishermen, in honor of San Rafael Arcangel, a day that is not highly concurred by citizens that take a little trip by fishing boat.

== Sources ==
- "Acajutla". 2006. Encyclopædia Britannica. Encyclopædia Britannica Online Library Edition. (Retrieved 16 September 2006).
- "Central America: Interesting Record of the Voyage of the Steamship Columbus from Panama to Central American Ports – Trade of the Coast – Agriculture in Guatemala – Cochineal and Indigo Trade in Guatemala and Salvador – Increase in the Growth of Coffee in Salvador – Facilities of Trade – General News, etc." The New York Times, 29 January 1858
- Meislin, Richard J. "5 Key Leaders of the Opposition Reported Kidnapped in Salvador." The New York Times. 23 October 1982.
- Snaden, James N. "El Salvador". Lands and Peoples. Grolier Online. (Retrieved 16 September 2006)
- "Trade with Central America and with the States of the South Pacific, via Isthmus of Panama." The New York Times. 17 July 1858.
- Woodward Jr., Ralph L. "El Salvador". Encyclopedia Americana. Grolier Online. (Retrieved 16 September 2006).
