= HMS Torbay =

Five ships of the British Royal Navy have been named HMS Torbay, after Torbay on the southwest English coast.

- HMS Torbay (1693), an 80-gun second rate launched in 1693, rebuilt in 1719 and broken up in 1749.
- HMS Torbay was previously HMS Neptune, a 90-gun second rate launched in 1683, renamed Torbay in 1750 and sold in 1785.
- HMS Torbay (1919), an S-class destroyer launched in 1919. She was transferred to the Royal Canadian Navy in 1928 and renamed HMCS Champlain. She was sold in 1937.
- HMS Torbay (N79), a T-class submarine launched in 1940 and sold in 1945.
- HMS Torbay (S90), a Trafalgar-class nuclear submarine launched 1985 and decommissioned in 2017.
