= HMCS Vancouver (F6A) =

Destroyer of the Royal Canadian Navy

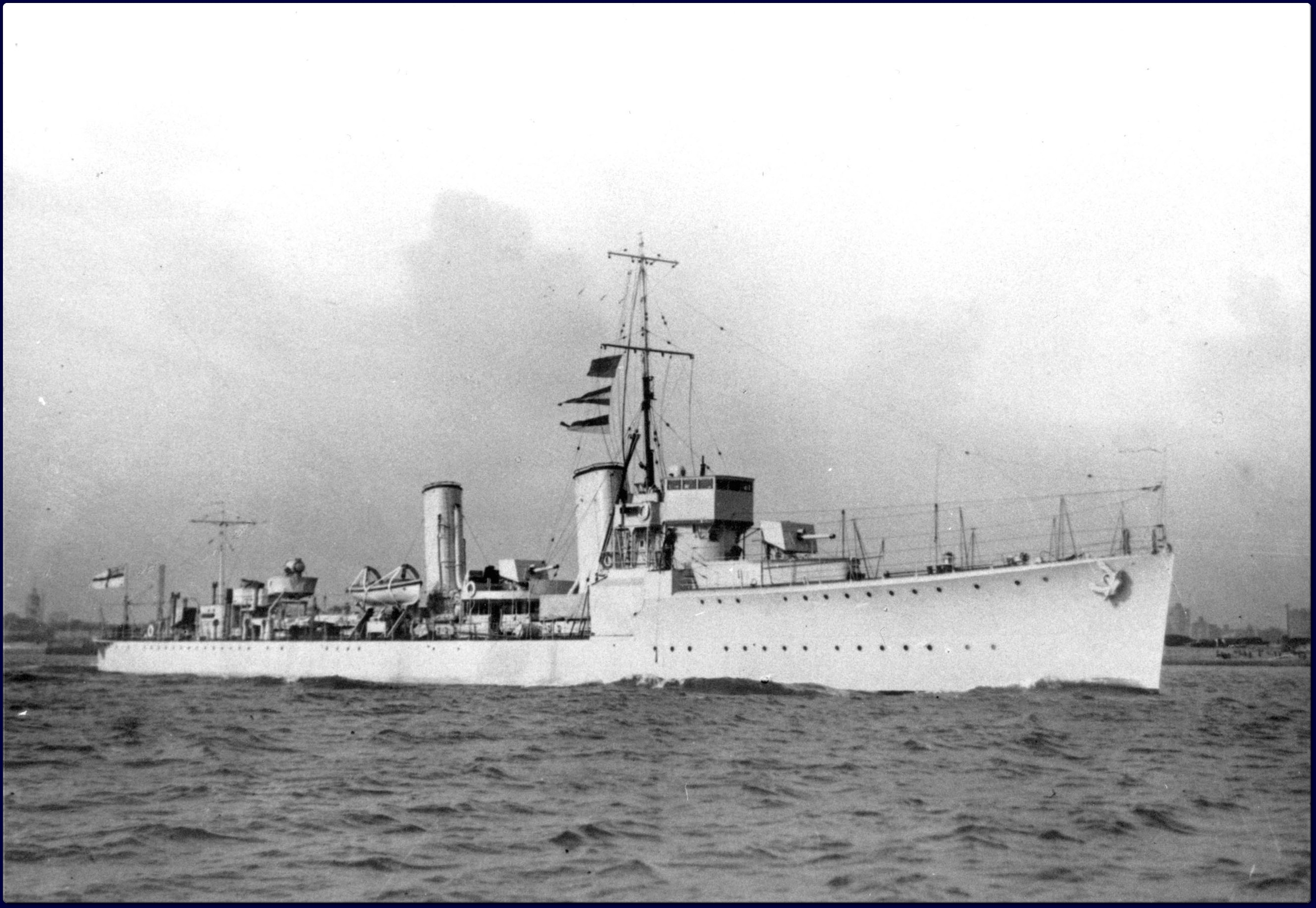
- Vancouver underway

History

United Kingdom
- Name: Toreador
- Namesake: Toreador
- Ordered: June 1917
- Builder: Thornycroft
- Laid down: November 1917
- Launched: 7 December 1918
- Completed: April 1919
- Identification: Pennant number: F6A
- Fate: Loaned to Royal Canadian Navy 1927

Canada
- Name: Vancouver
- Namesake: George Vancouver
- Acquired: 1927
- Commissioned: 1 March 1928
- Decommissioned: 25 November 1936
- Fate: Arrived Vancouver 24 April 1937 for scrapping

General characteristics
- Class & type: Thornycroft S-class destroyer
- Displacement: 1,087 long tons (1,104 t)
- Length: 276 ft (84 m)
- Beam: 27.5 ft (8.4 m)
- Draught: 10.5 ft (3.2 m)
- Installed power: 3 Yarrow boilers; 27,000 shp (20,000 kW)
- Propulsion: Brown-Curtis steam turbines, 2 shafts,
- Speed: 30 knots (56 km/h; 35 mph)
- Complement: 90
- Armament: 3 × QF 4 in (102 mm) Mark IV guns; 1 × QF 2-pounder (40 mm) pom-pom; 2 × twin tubes for 21 in (533 mm) torpedoes; 2 × 18 in (450 mm) torpedo tubes

HMCS Vancouver, was a Thornycroft S-class destroyer, formerly HMS Toreador built for the Royal Navy in 1917–1919. Seeing limited service with the Royal Navy, the ship was loaned to the Royal Canadian Navy in March 1928. The destroyer served primarily as a training vessel until 1936 when the vessel was discarded.

== Design ==
During the First World War, Royal Navy intelligence investigated German torpedo craft and found that they were more lightly armed than the designs the United Kingdom was building. The Royal Navy altered their destroyer designs so that the ships would be less expensive. This meant that the design known as the Admiralty modified 'Trenchant' or S class would be smaller, faster and less expensive, ships which could be built quickly. The ships had a complement of 90 officers and ratings.

The Thornycroft version of the S class displaced 1,087 long tons (1,104 t). The vessels were 276 feet (84 m) long, had a beam of 27 feet 4 inches (8.33 m) and a draught of 10 feet 6 inches (3.20 m). They were larger than their sister ships of the Yarrow or Admiralty design. The S class had a trawler-like bow with a more sharply sheered and turtleback forecastle.

The Thornycroft S-class design was propelled by two shafts driven by Brown-Curtis steam turbines powered by three Yarrow boilers (built by Thornycroft). This created 27,000 shaft horsepower (20,000 kW). This gave the ships a maximum speed of 30 knots (56 km/h; 35 mph).

S-class destroyers were armed with three quick-firing (QF) 4-inch (102 mm)/45 calibre Mk IV guns in three single mounts. The forecastle gun was placed on a raised platform. They were also equipped with a QF 2-pounder (40 mm) pom-pom for use against aircraft. The vessels also had four Lewis machine guns installed.

All S-class destroyers had four 21-inch (533 mm) torpedo tubes installed in two twin mounts. Unlike the Admiralty and Yarrow designs, all Thornycroft designed ships were equipped with two 18-inch (450 mm) torpedo tubes. Arrayed along the sides of the ship, they were fitted to fire through a narrow aperture.

== Service history ==
=== Royal Navy ===
Toreador was ordered in June 1917 as part of the second order of Thornycroft S-class destroyer for the Royal Navy. She was laid down in November 1917 and launched on 7 December 1918. She was placed in reserve at HMNB Portsmouth in May 1919.

=== Royal Canadian Navy ===
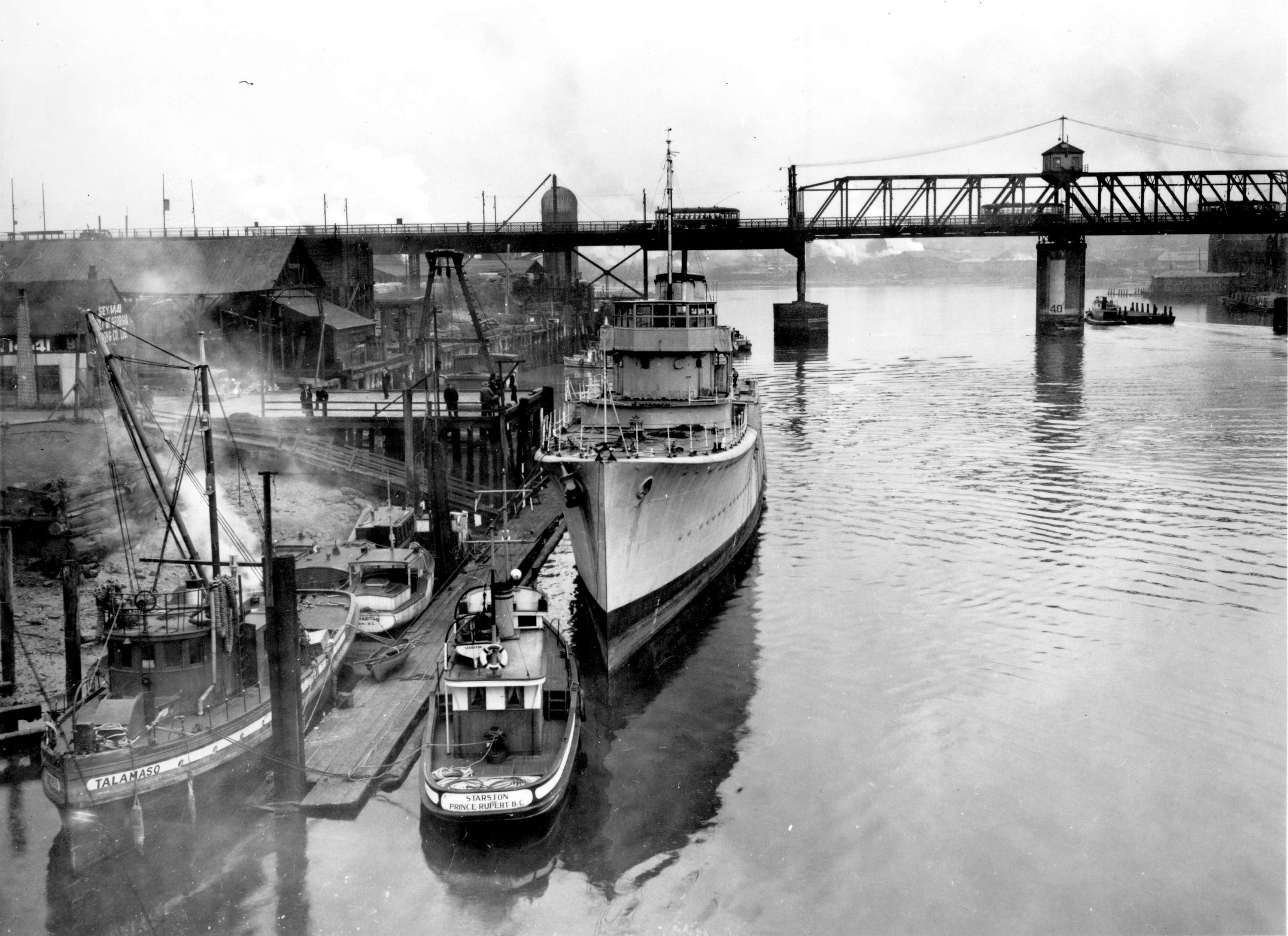
The former HMCS Vancouver being prepared for recycling.

Toreador, along with her sister Torbay, were loaned by the British government to Canada in 1927 to replace their two existing destroyers, Patrician and Patriot. At the same time the Canadian Government commissioned the construction of two further destroyers, Saguenay and Skeena at Portsmouth. The vessel was renamed Vancouver, after the famous explorer, George Vancouver. Vancouver and Champlain were the first two ships with names associated with Canada.

During the 1930s Vancouver served on the west coast of Canada alongside Skeena. The vessel was used as a training vessel, visiting many ports along the coast. In 1930, Vancouver was named in the London Naval Treaty, which put limits on the amount of warships a nation could have and their size. Initially the west coast training ships did not have a cruise through the Caribbean Sea like their east coast comrades. However, after a couple of winters in Canadian waters, Vancouver was sent to join Champlain in the West Indies.

In 1931, the British Foreign Office requested that Canada send one of its vessels to El Salvador due to an increased threat to British persons and property there following a rebellion until a Royal Navy ship could arrive. Arriving on 23 January 1932, Vancouver and Skeena went to separate ports initially. Vancouver was sent to Port La Union, where the ship refueled and re-provisioned. While there the British Charge d'Affairs sent an order by telephone for the ship to land an armed platoon, however, the order was never followed. Most of the time at Port La Union was spent passing idle and the destroyer remained there until 25 January when she departed for Acajutla. She remained at Acajutla until after the senior officers had returned from their inspection of what became known as la matanza.

During a training deployment to the Caribbean Sea in 1934, Vancouver took part in the longest cruise attempted by the Royal Canadian Navy to that point. On that same deployment, the ship spent one week training with the British Home Fleet.

By 1935 the condition of the two S-class destroyers in Canadian service had deteriorated significantly. Custom at this time was to give an active destroyer a thorough and complete refit (referred to as a D2) every six to eight years. Vancouver, which had been completed in 1918, had never undergone such a refit. She and her sister ship were surveyed by naval engineers in 1934 and the report concluded that it would cost $165,000 to refit both ships. This had to be done as the loan conditions with the British government stipulated that the ships had to be returned in good condition. Rendering them safe for an ocean crossing to the United Kingdom would still cost $50,000 more than a standard refit.

Canada intended to return the S-class destroyers to the United Kingdom as they were considered antiquated. The United Kingdom initially wanted to have them scrapped at home, however they agreed to have them broken up in Canada as they were no longer sure of the two vessels crossing the ocean. It was also agreed that the armament of the destroyers would remain in Canadian stockpiles after the ships were broken up. Vancouver were noted as being set for disposal in 1936. She was paid off on 25 November 1936 and broken up in 1937.
