= HMS Mignonette =

Two vessels of the Royal Navy have been named HMS Mignonette:

- HMS Mignonette (1916), an Arabis-class sloop launched on 26 January 1916 and sunk by a mine on 17 March 1917.
- HMS Mignonette (K38), a Flower-class corvette launched on 28 January 1941 and sold in 1946.

== See also ==
- HMS Mignonne

== Sources ==
Colledge, J. J.; Warlow, Ben (2006) [1969]. Ships of the Royal Navy: The Complete Record of All Fighting Ships of the Royal Navy from the 15th Century to the Present (3rd Rev ed.). London: Chatham Publishing. ISBN 978-1-86176-281-8. OCLC 67375475.
