= HMS Southampton =

Six Royal Navy ships have borne the name HMS Southampton. All were named after Southampton, a port on the south coast of England.

- HMS Southampton (1693) was a 48-gun fourth rate launched in 1693. The ship was rebuilt in 1700, hulked at Jamaica in 1728 and finally broken up in 1771.
- HMS Southampton (1757) was a 32-gun fifth rate launched in 1757, and wrecked in 1812.
- HMS Southampton (1820) was a 60-gun fourth rate launched in 1820. In 1867 the ship was lent to the Hull Committee, finally being sold in 1912.
- HMS Southampton (1912) was a Town-class cruiser, launched in 1912 and sold in 1926. She fought at the Battle of Jutland.
- HMS Southampton (C83) was a Town-class cruiser, launched in 1936 and sunk off Malta on 11 January 1941.
- HMS Southampton (D90) was a Type 42 destroyer, launched in 1979 and decommissioned in 2009.

== Honours ==
- Emeraude 1757
- Belle Isle 1761
- The Glorious First of June 1794
- St Vincent 1797
- Heligoland 1914
- Dogger Bank 1915
- Jutland 1916
- Norway 1940
- Spartivento 1940
- Malta Convoys 1941
