= Canopus (Thrace) =

Town of ancient Thrace

Coordinates: 41°01′58″N 28°57′49″E

Canopus (Greek: Κάνωπος) was a town of ancient Thrace, inhabited during Roman times.

Its site is located near Hasköy in European Turkey.
