= HMS Charon =

Four ships of the Royal Navy have been named HMS Charon, after Charon, the boatman to Hades across the River Styx in Greek Mythology:

- HMS Charon (1778) was a 44-gun fifth rate launched in 1778 and destroyed at the Battle of Yorktown in 1781.
- HMS Charon (1783) was a 44-gun fifth rate launched in 1783. She was on harbour service from 1795, used as a troopship from 1800 and was broken up in 1805. Because Charon served in the navy's Egyptian campaign between 8 March 1801 and 2 September, her officers and crew qualified for the clasp "Egypt" to the Naval General Service Medal, which the Admiralty issued in 1847 to all surviving claimants.
- HMS Charon (1827) was a wooden paddle packet, formerly the GPO vessel Crusader. She was launched in 1827, transferred to the navy in 1837 and used as a mail packet. She was sold to Trinity House in 1849.
- HMS Charon (1856) was an Albacore-class wooden screw gunboat launched in 1856 and broken up in 1865.
- HMS Charon (1941) was an Assurance class rescue tug launched 1941 and scrapped in 1959.
