= USS Canopus =

Three ships of the United States Navy have been named Canopus after the first magnitude star Canopus in the constellation Argo.

- USS Canopus (AS-9) was launched in 1919 by the New York Shipbuilding Company as the Santa Leonora.
- USS Canopus (AD-33) (ordered as AS-27, but reclassified before keel-laying) was a destroyer tender, but construction was canceled in 1945 prior to launching.
- USS Canopus (AS-34) was launched on 12 February 1965.
