= HMS Dromedary =

Five ships of the Royal Navy have borne the name HMS Dromedary, after the dromedary:

- HMS Dromedary (1777) was a 30-gun storeship, formerly the British East India Company's East Indiaman Duke of Cumberland, launched in 1765. She made four voyages to China or India for the East India Company. The Admiralty purchased her in 1777, for service as an armed escort ship. She was registered as a fifth rate from 1779. She was broken up in 1783.
- HMS Dromedary was a 24-gun storeship, originally launched in 1782 as the 44-gun fifth rate HMS Janus. She was converted to a storeship and renamed Dromedary in 1788, and was wrecked in 1800.
- HMS Dromedary was a 24-gun storeship, formerly the merchant Kaikusroo. She was purchased in 1805 as a 40-gun and named HMS Howe, and then HMS Dromedary in 1806. In 1809 she carried Lachlan Macquarie to the colony of NSW, as the replacement governor for William Bligh. In 1819 she was re-commissioned as a convict ship and ferried convicts to Tasmania. She was then re-fitted as a timber transport and collected timber spars before returning to England. In the 1830s she sailed for Bermuda, where she was converted to a prison hulk, and subsequently broken up in 1864.
- HMS Dromedary (1862) was an iron screw troopship launched in 1862 sold in 1869.
- HMS Dromedary (1873) was an iron screw troopship, formerly the merchant Briton. She was purchased in 1873, and was sold in 1885.
