= USS Mignonette =

Tugboat of the United States Navy

History

United States
- Acquired: 1861
- Commissioned: 30 September 1862
- Fate: Sold, 18 April 1873

General characteristics
- Displacement: 50 tons
- Propulsion: steam engine; side-wheel propelled

USS Mignonette was a steam operated tugboat acquired by the Union Navy during the American Civil War. She was used by the Navy to patrol navigable waterways of the Confederacy to prevent the South from trading with other countries.

== Service history ==
Mignonette, a side wheel steam tug, was built in one of the ports on the western rivers before the American Civil War; acquired by the War Department as Dauntless in 1861; and transferred to the Union Navy and placed in commission at Cairo, Illinois, 30 September 1862. Assigned to Rear Adm. David Dixon Porter’s Mississippi Squadron, Dauntless was renamed Mignonette 19 October 1862 and served as station tugboat at Cairo through 1865. On 23 February 1865, she was turned over to Commodore John W. Livingston, Commandant at the Mound City, Illinois, naval station for service. Mignonette remained at Mound City until sold to Brown & Jones 18 April 1873.
