= HMS Lively =

Sixteen ships of the Royal Navy have been named HMS Lively. Another was planned, but renamed before being launched:

- HMS Lively (1689) was a 30-gun fifth rate captured from the French in 1689. She was re-captured by the French later that year.
- HMS Lively (1709) was a 12-gun sixth rate purchased in 1709 and sold in 1712.
- HMS Lively (1713) was a 20-gun sixth rate launched in 1713. She was broken up in 1738 and rebuilt as the next HMS Lively.
- HMS Lively (1740) was a 20-gun sixth rate launched in 1740 and sold in 1750.
- HMS Lively (1756) was a 20-gun sixth rate launched in 1756. She was captured by the French in 1778, but was recaptured in 1781, and was sold 1784.
- HMS Lively (1779) was a 14-gun brig-sloop purchased on the stocks and launched in 1779. She was seized by Americans she had taken prisoner in 1782 and was handed over to the Spanish at Havana.
- HMS Lively (1794) was a 32-gun fifth-rate frigate launched in 1794 and wrecked off Rota Point, near Cádiz in 1798.
- HMS Lively (1794 fireship) was a fireship purchased in 1794 and sold in 1798.
- HMS Lively (1797) was a 16-gun storeship, purchased on the stocks and launched in 1797. She was deleted from the navy lists in 1802.
- HMS Lively (1804) was a 38-gun fifth-rate frigate launched in 1804 and wrecked off Malta in 1810.
- HMS Lively was a cutter hired and then purchased in 1805. Her fate is unknown.
- HMS Lively was to have been a 36-gun fifth-rate frigate. She was renamed HMS Scamander in 1812 and was launched in 1813.
- HMS Lively (1813) was a 38-gun fifth-rate frigate launched in 1813. She was relegated to harbour service in 1831 and was sold in 1862.
- HMS Lively (1856) was a wooden screw gunboat launched in 1856. She was wrecked in 1863 on the Dutch coast.
- HMS Lively (1870) was a wooden paddle despatch vessel launched in 1870 and wrecked in 1883 near Stornoway.
- HMS Lively (1901) was a B-class torpedo boat destroyer launched in 1900, acquired by the navy in 1901 and sold in 1920.
- HMS Lively (G40) was an L-class destroyer launched in 1941 and sunk in 1942.
