= HMS Mignonne =

Three vessels of the Royal Navy have borne the name HMS Mignonne, which means "dainty" in French. (Note: Mignon/mignonne at Wiktionary)

- Mignonne was captured by the British in 1794 in the harbour of Calvi, used briefly and then burnt in 1797 as useless.
- Mignonne was a French navy corvette that the British captured in 1803 and disposed of in 1804 after she grounded at Jamaica.
- HMS Mignonne (1806) was the French navy brig Phaeton, which Pique captured in 1806. She was renamed Musette in 1807 and was sold in 1814.

== See also ==
- HMS Mignonette

== Source ==
- Colledge, J. J.; Warlow, Ben (2006) [1969]. Ships of the Royal Navy: The Complete Record of All Fighting Ships of the Royal Navy from the 15th Century to the Present (3rd Rev ed.). London: Chatham Publishing. ISBN 978-1-86176-281-8. OCLC 67375475.
