= HMS Canopus =

Two ships of the British Royal Navy have been named HMS Canopus :

- The first HMS Canopus (1798) was an 80-gun third-rate French ship of the line launched in 1797, captured at the Battle of the Nile, and commissioned into the Royal Navy. She was scrapped in 1887.
- The second HMS Canopus (1897) was a Canopus-class pre-dreadnought battleship launched in 1898 and finally broken up in 1920. She fought in the Battle of the Falkland Islands in 1914.

HMS Canopus was also the name of a Royal Navy training base at Alexandria in World War II.
