= HMS Strenuous (1918) =

Royal Navy S-class destroyer

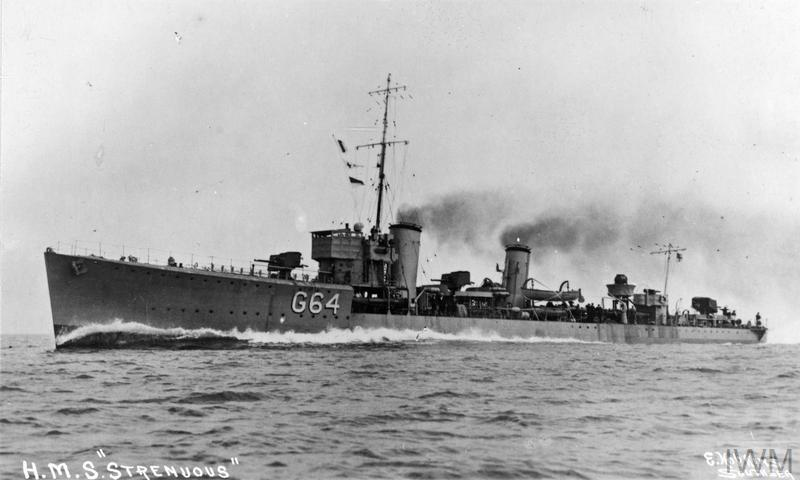
- HMS Strenuous in the interwar period

History

United Kingdom
- Name: HMS Strenuous
- Namesake: Strenuous
- Ordered: May 1917
- Builder: Scotts, Greenock
- Yard number: 493
- Laid down: March 1918
- Launched: 9 November 1918
- Completed: 20 October 1919
- Out of service: 25 August 1932
- Fate: Broken up

General characteristics
- Class & type: S-class destroyer
- Displacement: 1,075 long tons (1,092 t) normal; 1,220 long tons (1,240 t) deep load
- Length: 265 ft (80.8 m) p.p.
- Beam: 26 ft 8 in (8.13 m)
- Draught: 9 ft 10 in (3.00 m) mean
- Propulsion: 3 Yarrow boilers; 2 geared Parsons steam turbines, 27,000 shp
- Speed: 36 knots (41.4 mph; 66.7 km/h)
- Range: 2,750 nmi (5,090 km) at 15 kn (28 km/h)
- Complement: 90
- Armament: 3 × QF 4-inch (101.6 mm) Mark IV guns, mounting P Mk. IX; 1 × single 2-pounder (40-mm) "pom-pom" Mk. II anti-aircraft gun; 4 × 21 in (533 mm) torpedo tubes (2×2)

HMS Strenuous was an S-class destroyer, which served with the Royal Navy. Launched 9 November 1918 two days before the Armistice, the ship was too late to see service in the First World War. Instead, the destroyer served for only a few months as part of the Atlantic Fleet before being transferred to Reserve in May 1920, where the ship remained for the next ten years. The London Naval Treaty, signed in 1930, required the retirement of some destroyers to meet the Royal Navy's tonnage requirement and Strenuous was chosen as one of those to leave the service. The destroyer was therefore decommissioned and sold to be broken up on 25 August 1932.

== Design and development ==
Strenuous was one of thirty-three Admiralty S class destroyers ordered by the British Admiralty in June 1917 as part of the Twelfth War Construction Programme. The design was a development of the R class introduced as a cheaper and faster alternative to the V and W class. Differences with the R class were minor, such as having the searchlight moved aft. The vessel was the second of the name in the Royal Navy.

Strenuous had a overall length of 276 ft (84 m) and a length of 265 ft (81 m) between perpendiculars. Beam was 26 ft 8 in (8.13 m) and draught 9 ft 10 in (3.00 m). Displacement was 1,075 long tons (1,092 t) normal and 1,220 long tons (1,240 t) deep load. Three Yarrow boilers fed steam to two sets of Parsons geared steam turbines rated at 27,000 shaft horsepower (20,000 kW) and driving two shafts, giving a design speed of 36 knots (67 km/h; 41 mph) at normal loading and 32.5 knots (60.2 km/h; 37.4 mph) at deep load. Two funnels were fitted. The vessel carried 301 long tons (306 t) of fuel oil, giving a design range of 2,750 nautical miles (5,090 km; 3,160 mi) at 15 knots (28 km/h; 17 mph).

Armament consisted of three QF 4-inch (102 mm) Mk IV guns on the ship's centreline. One was mounted raised on the forecastle, one between the funnels and one aft. The ship also mounted a single 2-pounder (40 mm) pom-pom anti-aircraft gun for air defence. Four 21-inch (533 mm) torpedo tubes were fitted in two twin rotating mounts aft. The ship was designed to mount two 18-inch (457 mm) tubes either side of the superstructure but this addition required the forecastle plating to be cut away, making the vessel very wet, so they were removed. The weight saved enabled the heavier Mark V 21-inch torpedo to be carried. The ship's complement was 90 officers and ratings.

== Construction and career ==
Laid down in January 1918 by Scotts in Greenock with the yard number 493, Strenuous was launched on 9 November 1918. The Armistice two days later meant that the destroyer never saw active wartime service. Completed on 20 October 1919, the ship joined the Fourth Destroyer Flotilla of the Atlantic Fleet under the C-class light cruiser Castor. The destroyer was allocated the pennant number G64. The ship served in active duty for only a few months, being recommissioned to Reserve Fleet at Devonport on 6 May 1920.

On 22 April 1930, the United Kingdom signed the London Naval Treaty, which limited total destroyer tonnage in the Navy. Having remained on reserve for more than a decade, Strenuous was in poor condition and was one of those chosen to be retired. On 25 August 1932, the destroyer was sold to Metal Industries of Charlestown, Fife, and broken up at Grays.
