= HMCS Champlain (1919) =

Destroyer of the Royal Canadian Navy

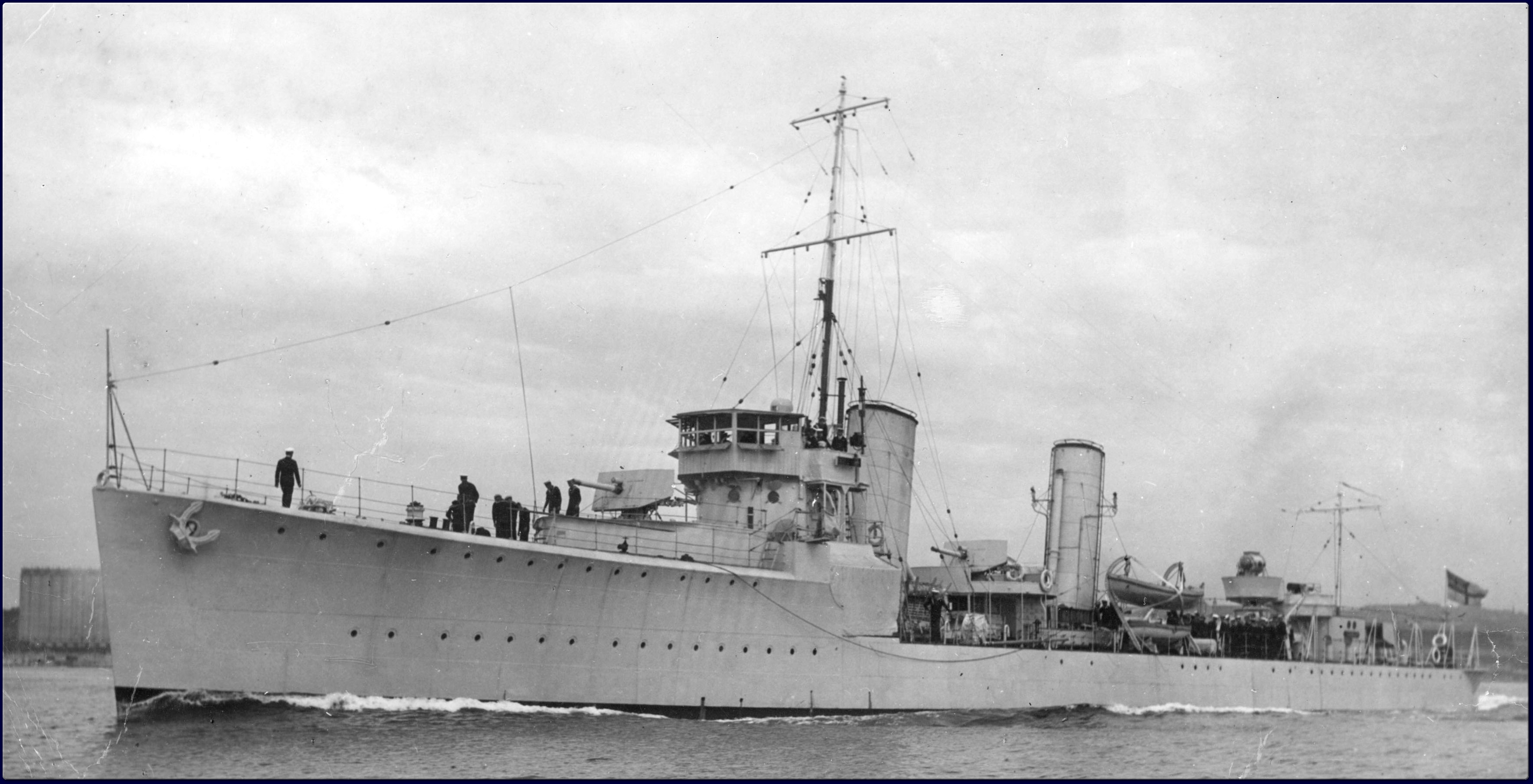
- Champlain c. 1932

History

United Kingdom
- Name: Torbay
- Namesake: Torbay, England
- Ordered: June 1917
- Builder: Thornycroft
- Launched: 6 March 1919
- Decommissioned: 1928
- Identification: Pennant number F 35
- Fate: Transferred to Royal Canadian Navy 1928

Canada
- Name: Champlain
- Namesake: Samuel de Champlain
- Acquired: 1 March 1928
- Decommissioned: 25 November 1936
- Fate: Sold, scrapped 1937

General characteristics
- Class & type: Thornycroft S-class destroyer
- Displacement: 1,087 tons
- Length: 276 ft (84 m)
- Beam: 27.5 ft (8.4 m)
- Draught: 10.5 ft (3.2 m)
- Speed: 30 knots (56 km/h; 35 mph)
- Complement: 90
- Armament: 3 × QF 4 in (102 mm) Mark IV guns; 1 × QF 12-pounder 12 cwt naval gun; 2 × twin tubes for 21 in (533 mm) torpedoes

HMCS Champlain was a Thornycroft S-class destroyer, formerly HMS Torbay built for the Royal Navy in 1917–1919. She was transferred to the Royal Canadian Navy in 1928 and served primarily as a training ship until 1936.

== Design and description ==
During the First World War, Royal Navy intelligence investigated German torpedo craft and found that they were more lightly armed than the designs the UK was building. The Royal Navy altered their destroyer designs so that the ships would be less expensive. This meant that the design known as the Admiralty modified 'Trenchant' or "S" class would be smaller, faster and less expensive, ships which could be built quickly. The ships had a complement of 90 officers and ratings.

The Thornycroft version of the S class displaced 1,087 tons. The vessels were 276 feet (84 m) long, had a beam of 27 feet 4 inches (8.33 m) and a draught of 10 feet 6 inches (3.20 m). They were larger than their sister ships of the Yarrow or Admiralty designs. The S class had a trawler-like bow with a more sharply sheered and turtleback forecastle.

The Thornycroft S-class design were propelled by two shafts driven by Brown-Curtis steam turbines powered by three Yarrow boilers (built by Thornycroft), creating 27,000 shaft horsepower (20,000 kW). This gave the ship a maximum speed of 30 knots (56 km/h; 35 mph).

S-class destroyers were armed with three quick-firing (QF) 4-inch (102 mm)/45 calibre Mk IV guns in single mounts. The forecastle gun was placed on a raised platform. They were also equipped with a QF 2-pounder 1.6 in (40 mm) "pom-pom" gun for use against aircraft. The vessels also had four Lewis machine guns installed. All S-class destroyers had four 21-inch (533 mm) torpedo tubes installed in two twin mounts. Unlike the Admiralty and Yarrow designs, all the Thornycroft designed ships had two 18-inch (460 mm) torpedo tubes equipped. Arrayed along the sides of the ship, they were fitted to fire through a narrow aperture.

== Service history ==
=== Royal Navy ===
Torbay, was ordered in June 1917 as part of the second order of Thornycroft S-class destroyers by the Royal Navy. In November 1919, the destroyer was part of the 4th Destroyer Flotilla, which was part of the Atlantic Fleet. The destroyer remained a part of this unit until February 1920. Torbay was placed on the reserve list in March 1920 and laid up at HMNB Portsmouth.

=== Royal Canadian Navy ===
Torbay, along with her sister Toreador, were loaned by the British Government to Canada in 1927 as temporary replacements for the two destroyers in service with the Royal Canadian Navy, Patrician and Patriot. Torbay was renamed Champlain for the famous explorer Samuel de Champlain. At the same time the Canadian government commissioned the construction of two further destroyers, Saguenay and Skeena. The vessel was transferred and commissioned into the Royal Canadian Navy on 1 March 1928 at Portsmouth.

Following commissioning, Champlain was sent to the east coast, based out of Halifax. She had come to Canada via the West Indies and arrived in May 1928. On 25 August 1928, the destroyer left Halifax for a goodwill tour of the east coast, returning 3 September. The ship was used primarily for training purposes for both regular and reserve personnel.

Initially only the east coast vessels participated in the winter cruise in the Caribbean Sea, however beginning in 1929, Vancouver joined Champlain beginning a tradition that would last until the outbreak of the Second World War. These peacetime training cruises were not always smooth. While en route to the Caribbean Sea in January 1931, Champlain encountered a gale. The ship pushed through the storm, resulting in damage to the ship. The rigging was carried away and when a replacement was jury-rigged together, that too was blown away. The dinghy and whaler suffered damage and one person was injured.

During another winter cruise, personnel from Champlain were involved in an incident at Port of Spain, Trinidad. The chief officer of the Danish vessel MV Stensby had noticed discrepancies among the victuals and had caught the chief tally clerk passing food out of a porthole. A confrontation ensued that left two people injured. Members of Champlain's crew responded to Stensby's distress signal and restored order before returning to their ship.

During the 1930s Champlain served on the east coast of Canada alongside Saguenay. In 1934 the ship returned to the Caribbean with Saguenay, Skeena and Vancouver. There, the four ships participated in the longest cruise that the Royal Canadian Navy had attempted to that point. During the time in the Caribbean, the vessel took part in a week-long training session with the Royal Navy's Home Fleet.

By 1935 the condition of the two S-class destroyers in Canadian service had deteriorated significantly. Custom at this time was to give an active destroyer a thorough and complete refit (referred to as a D2) every six to eight years. Champlain, which had been completed in 1918, had never undergone such a refit. She and her sister were surveyed by naval engineers in 1934 and the report concluded that it would cost $165,000 to refit both ships. This had to be done as the loan conditions with the British government stipulated that the ships had to be returned in good condition. Rendering them safe for an ocean crossing to the United Kingdom would still cost $50,000 more than a standard refit.

Canada intended to return the S-class destroyers to the United Kingdom as they were considered antiquated. The United Kingdom initially wanted to have them broken up within the United Kingdom. However, they agreed to have them scrapped in Canada as they were no longer sure of the two vessels crossing the ocean successfully. It was also agreed that the armament of the destroyers would remain in Canadian stockpiles after the ships were broken up. Champlain was mentioned in the London Naval Treaty of 1930 as being set for disposal in 1936, and was to be replaced by the newer St. Laurent.

During her service with the Royal Canadian Navy, Champlain's running cost was as low as $68,678 in 1928 and as high as $217,021 in 1931. The destroyer was paid off at Halifax on 25 November 1936 and broken up in 1937.
