= Hugh MacDonell =

Hugh MacDonell may refer to:

- Hugh Guion MacDonell (1831–1904), British diplomat
- Hugh MacDonell of Aberchalder (1753–1847), soldier and political figure in Upper Canada
