= Edward Blanckley =

Royal Navy officer (1791–1845)

Captain Edward Blanckley
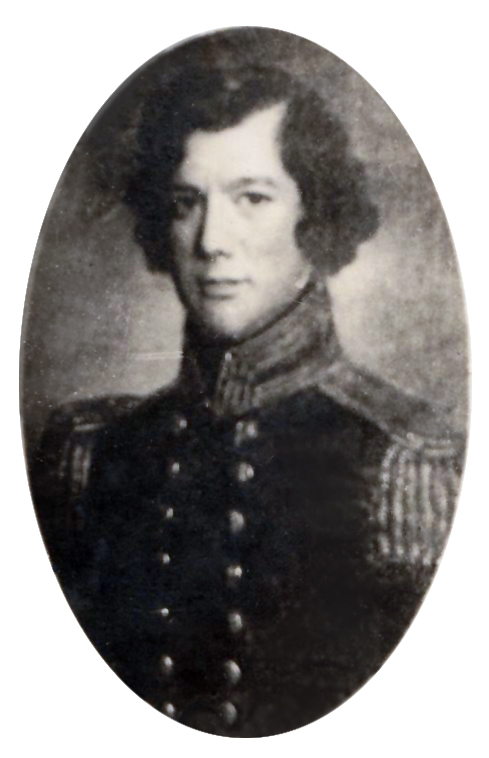
- Photograph of portrait of Edward Blanckley. Style family collection.
- Born: c. 1790; Mahón, Menorca, Spain
- Died: 1845; 27 Duke Street, St James's, London, UK
- Occupations: Royal Navy officer, director of Kollmann's Railway, Locomotive and Carriage improvement company
- Writing career
- Period: 19th century

Captain Edward Blanckley (c. 1790 – 4 May 1845) was a Royal Navy officer, and director of Kollmann's Railway, Locomotive and Carriage improvement company. His first wife, Harriet Matcham, was the niece of Horatio Nelson, 1st Viscount Nelson.

== Early life ==
Edward Blanckley was born in Mahón, Menorca, Spain in about 1790 where his father, Henry Stanyford Blanckley, was formally appointed British Consul to Majorca, Menorca and Ibiza in the year of Edward's birth. Edward had three older living siblings: Ann, Henry Stanyford and Maria. Edward Blanckley's mother, Mary née Rogers died, following a long illness, in the spa resort of Bristol Hotwells on 10 March 1798. His father remarried Mary Richards in Sulham, Berkshire, England on 13 March 1800, resulting in Edward having two younger half-sisters, Elizabeth (who later authored Six Years Residence in Algiers, a biographical account of their father's time as British Consul to Algiers,) and Henrietta. Increasing Spanish hostility towards Britain during the Napoleonic Wars resulted in the Spanish governor of Menorca imposing increasingly strict sanctions on the Blanckley family, first by issuing a public order forbidding native families to visit or communicate with them, then by placing Edward's father, Henry Stanyford Blanckley, under house arrest. The guards posted at their front door stabbed the family's butler in the arm with a bayonet when they misidentified him as Edward's father. Edward joined the Royal Navy as midshipman on 17 January 1805 shortly before his family evacuated Menorca in a "wretched boat".

== Early Naval Career ==
Edward Blanckley first joined the Royal Navy on 17 January 1805 as a midshipman on the 54-gun Madras under Captain Charles Marsh Schomberg. Edward remained as midshipman serving in the Mediterranean for the next nine years. He joined HMS Pylades in July 1807 and the 54-gun HMS Glatton in December 1808, both under the commanded of Captain George Miller Bligh. He transferred to the 16-gun HMS Wizard under Captain Abel Ferris in May 1809. He joined the 28-gun HMS Mercury in October 1809, and the 38-gun HMS Imperieuse in March 1810, both under Captain Henry Duncan. According to his entry in A Naval Biographical Dictionary:

"He assisted, on 2 Nov. 1811, in conjunction with the Thames 32, at the gallant capture and destruction, in the harbour of Palinuro, on the coast of Calabria, of 10 gun-boats and 22 richly-laden feluccas, although defended by a strong tower, two batteries, and a land force of 700 men; contributed next, 27 June 1812, to the destruction of a French convoy and of the batteries of Languelia and Alassio, in the Gulf of Genoa; was present, on 17 Aug. in the same year, in a spirited skirmish with a powerful Neapolitan squadron in the Bay of Naples; participated, with the squadron under Capt. Hon. Geo. Heneage Lawrence Dundas, in the capture, 5 Oct. 1813, of 29 French vessels, anchored under the guns of two batteries and a tower, at Port d’Anzo; and subsequently witnessed, independently of many other services, the operations at Via Reggio and Leghorn, under Sir Josias Rowley."

In August 1814, Midshipman Edward Blanckley transferred from HMS Imperieuse with Captain Henry Duncan to the 50-gun HMS Glasgow to spend several months cruising the seas off the Outer Hebrides. He was advanced to the rank of lieutenant on 6 February 1815, and left active service in April 1815.

== Marriage to Harriet Matcham ==
Edward Blanckley stayed with his family at 8 Paragon Buildings, Bath after ceasing active Royal Navy service in 1815. His father, Henry Stanyford Blanckley wrote to Edward's sister Maria on 23 April 1816 telling her that he had decided to emigrate to a warmer place "somewhere to the southward on the Continent", adding:

"Edward is still with us he has passed a gay winter, every night (Sunday excepted) has he been dancing, the gayest fellow in Bath. I hardly see him but at dinner as he keeps such late hours, that he does not rise early, & our breakfast is generally over before he comes down. This seems to agree with him, and after his long fag as a Midshipman he ought to be indulged in recreation. I know not at present how he intends to dispose of himself when we leave this [house]. I shall leave it to himself, it will be well if he can get employed."

Edward travelled to Europe with his family. The Blanckleys rented a house in Paris where they aided their friends, the Matchams, to find a rental property in Boulogne-Billancourt. The Matcham family were headed by George Matcham and his wife, Catherine, the sister of Horatio Nelson, 1st Viscount Nelson, and the family had his and Emma, Lady Hamilton's orphaned fifteen-year-old daughter Horatia Nelson staying with them as their ward at this time. The Blanckleys and Matchams toured Europe together, and Edward Blanckley married Harriet Matcham in Naples in April 1819.

Edward and Harriet's first child, Henry Duncan Blanckley was born on 7 February 1820 in Malta, where Edward's sister Ann, now Mrs Dalzel, was a resident. Their second child, Edward Nelson Blanckley, was baptised in Southampton, Hampshire, England on 30 March 1822, but was buried two weeks later, on 15 April, in the same parish church.

== First Anglo-Burmese War ==
Edward Blanckley was active in the First Anglo-Burmese War. Edward joined 28-gun HMS Alligator (1821) on 16 May 1822, under Captain Thomas Alexander. Edward Blanckley was made acting commander of HMS Sophie in about April 1825. However, HMS Sophie was sold, and Edward travelled back to England on the 50-gun Liffey, commanded by Captain Thomas Coe arriving in Portsmouth on 21 January 1826, with his promotion to Royal Navy commander having been formalised by the Admiralty during his homeward journey on 10 December 1825.

== Civilian life 1826 - 1832 ==
An April 1827 notice names Edward Blanckley as a recipient of aid donations for a war widow, with his address as 94 Rue Royale, Versailles. His father Henry Stanyford Blanckley died in Versailles the following year, on 12 May 1828. Edward had established an address at Raleigh House, Union Road, Plymouth prior to his departure for South America on HMS Pylades (1824) on 22 May 1831. Edward and Harriet's son Horatio Charles Nelson Blanckley was born in Versailles in about 1832.

== Pylades tour of South America ==
Edward Blanckley was given command of 18-gun HMS Pylades (1824) for a tour of South America. According to his entry in A Naval Biographical Dictionary:

"On his passage thither he received the open acknowledgments of the British residents at Madeira for “his manly protection of their interests at an eventful period.” After serving most creditably for three years, during which period he also elicited the public thanks of the British merchants at Pemambuco for his active protection of themselves and their property at a time of revolt and massacre, he returned home with a freight of 400,000 dollars, and was paid off in June, 1834. His elevation to Post-rank took place 23 Jan. 1841."

== Post-service life ==
Edward and Harriet's only daughter, Catherine Nelson Parker Toriana Blanckley, was born at Raleigh House in Plymouth on 5 May 1835. Their last child, Nelson Raleigh Matcham Blanckley, was born in 1838. Edward's wife, Harriet, died of child-bed fever in Raleigh House, Plymouth on 19 August 1838. Edward Blanckley was promoted to captain of the Royal Navy in 1841. Edward Blanckley was resident at 27 Duke Street, St James's, London, UK when the 1841 census was taken. He married, on 14 July 1841, Sarah Elizabeth Nayler of Redland Hall, Gloucester, the eldest daughter of the late Sir George Nayler, Garter King-at-Arms. He was listed as a director of Kollmann's Railway, Locomotive and Carriage improvement company in 1844. He died at Duke Street, Grosvenor Square, London, England on 4 May 1845 of "Anasarca 3 weeks".
