= Hugh MacDonell of Aberchalder =

Canadian politician

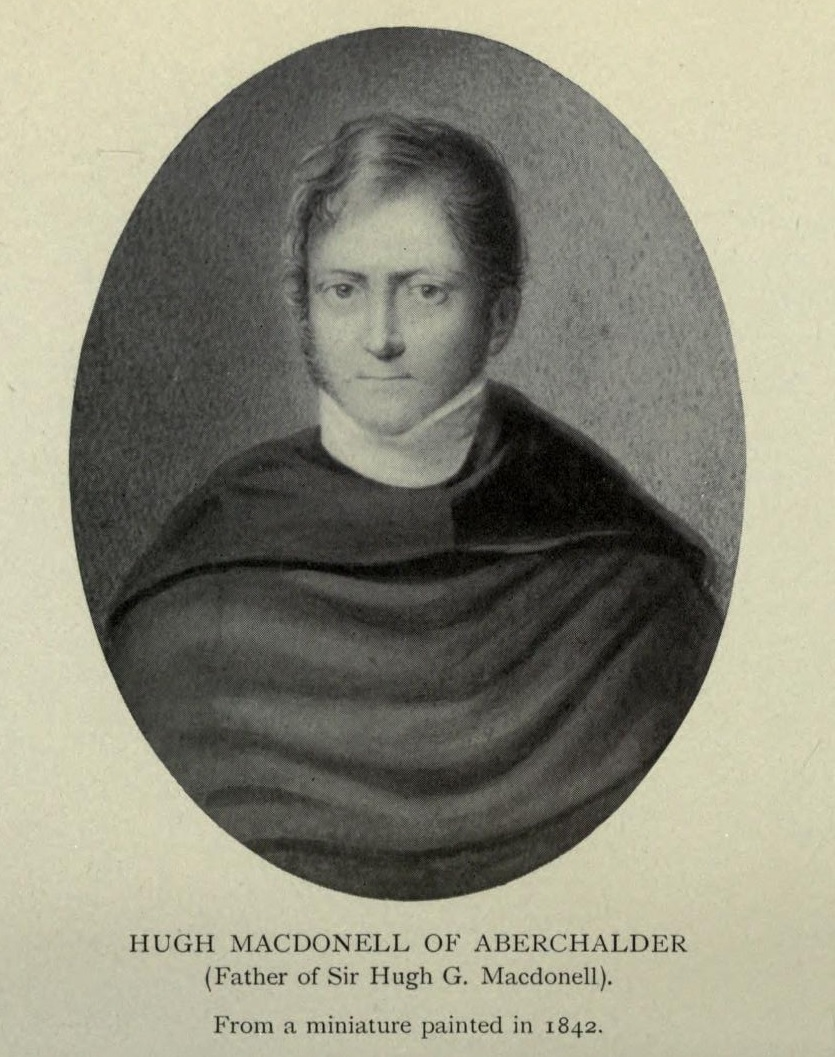
Portrait taken from the book "Reminiscences of Diplomatic Life" by his daughter-in-law, Anne Lumb MacDonell, wife of his son Sir Hugh Guion MacDonell

Hugh MacDonell of Aberchalder (c. 1760–1833) was a soldier and political figure in Upper Canada.

He was born at Aberchalder Lodge in Scotland. In 1773, he came with his father and uncles to the Mohawk Valley of New York, as part of a major migration, settling on Sir William Johnson's estate near Johnstown. As a loyalist, he was taken prisoner by Major-General Philip John Schuyler shortly before the American Revolution began. After escaping, he made his way to Montreal in 1777 and joined the King's Royal Regiment of New York. After the regiment was disbanded in 1783, he settled in Upper Canada. From 1788 to 1794, he held an appointment as land surveyor in the Eastern District.

In 1792, Hugh and his brother, John McDonell, were elected to the House of Assembly in the 1st Parliament of Upper Canada, representing Glengarry. In 1794, Lieutenant Governor John Graves Simcoe appointed him first adjutant-general of militia for the province. He later served as captain in the Royal Canadian Volunteer Regiment and lieutenant-colonel of the Glengarry militia.

He went to England in 1804 seeking employment. In 1805 he was appointed assistant commissary general at Gibraltar through the patronage of Prince Edward, Duke of Kent and Strathearn. He was appointed consul general in Algiers in 1811, where he married the daughter of the Danish consul, Ida Louise Ulrich (1800, Copenhagen-1880, Florence). He succeeded Henry Stanyford Blanckley as consul general, arriving in Algiers in August 1812. He was also responsible, on an informal basis, for the Portuguese consulate in Algiers.

Through this line, his granddaughter would become the Duchess of Montmorency. He retired from that post to Florence, Italy where he died in 1847.Prior to Ida, he was married to Anne Hughes (1779–1814) who was the daughter of Major James Hughes and Charlotte Martel de Brouage. Major Huges is believed to be the first Mayor of Montreal and Charlotte was the daughter of a prominent French-Canadian aristocratic family. Through this line, his daughter Anne would become Lady Wynyard, wife of lt Gen. Sir Robert Wynyard, whose father William was Equerry to George III and his mother Jane Gladwyn was lady in waiting to Queen Charlotte.

______________

Hugh, an adolescent, along with his father, Alexander MacDonell of Aberchalder, 1st of Aberchalder (Clan Chief), his brother, Sir John MacDonell of Aberchalder, his uncles, John of Leek and Allan of Collachie, along with many other Scots, To HMS Pearl, in September 1773, in Fort William to arrive at New York in October 1773.

The great majority settled in the valley of the Mohawk, under the patronage of Sir William Johnson.

In 1776, the war of independence of United States explodes, where the great majority of the MacDonell join to the King's Royal Regiment of New York.

In the spring of 1777 Alexander, Hugh and others, were captured by General Schuyler's forces and locked up in Lancaster, and then transferred to Albany.

During the next months in prison, Alexander of Aberchalder and John of Leek, under the orders of General Schuyler, were allowed to return to the Johnstown region to visit their families, but this did not end there. The general had the idea of taking all the Highlanders prisoners, including the women, the elderly, and the children.

This idea was not to the liking of Alexander and John, making a determination to gather them all and set out for Canada, through the Adirondack woods.

They settled in what was called the Lunenburg District, which is now Glengarry County.

In 1792, Hugh MacDonell of Aberchalder, was chosen as member for the First Rifing of the County of Glengarry

In 1802, after the Treaty of Amiens, his regiment (Royal Canadian Volunteer Regiment) was dissolved and he was without rank or half board and without any kind of remuneration.

Due to this, in 1804, Hugh MacDonell made the decision to travel, with his family, to London, under the tutelage of the Duke of Kent (his friendship was formed when the Duke was in service in Canada), since he was appointed Assistant Commissary General at Gibraltar.

In 1810, with Lord Cochrane, he traveled to Algiers on a diplomatic mission and in 1811 he was appointed Consul General; a position that he maintained until 1824.

In 1814 his first wife dies, Anne Hughes, then marries the daughter of the Danish Consul-General, Ida Louise Ulrich, 14 years old.

In 1816, the Dey of Algiers, took Hugh and his family, as prisoners and other diplomatic delegates from other nations.

The Mediterranean Fleet, commanded by Lord Exmouth, when being informed of the actions taken by the Dey of Algiers, makes the decision to travel to mediate the terms of the liberation of the British diplomatic contingent and the other delegates.

In the face of the denial of the Dey of Algiers, Lord Exmouth has no choice but to bombard the city to free his countrymen.

Ida, disguised as a British soldier, manages to outwit the Dey and escapes, along with her first daughter, Louise MacDonell, hidden in a wicker basket, covered with cabbage leaves, but Louise begins to cry, being discovered by the Dey, and at that moment, in the desperation of not knowing what to do, Ida throws herself into the sea next to her newborn daughter and is rescued by the Mediterranean fleet.

After the liberation, Hugh, with a certain age, decides to take a time of rest and travels to Gibraltar, soon to return to its place as Consul General until 1828.

From 1828 until his death, on 3 June 1847 he decided that Florence would be the best place to live his last years and raise his family. He was buried in the Swiss-owned so-called 'English' cemetery in Piazzale Donatello and the words engraved in the stone are: "Sacred to the memory of Hugh MacDonell ESQ Died at Florence on the 3rd June 1847" at 94 years old.
