= HMS Sophia =

Five vessels of the British Royal Navy have borne the name Sophia:

- HMS Sophia (1652) (also Speaker's Prize), of 300 tons (bm) and 26 guns, captured in 1652 and sold in 1657.
- HMS Sophia (1685) of 145 tons (bm) and 12 guns that Kingfisher captured in 1685 during the rebellion of Archibald Campbell, 9th Earl of Argyll, against King James. She became a fireship in 1688, a hoy in 1690, and was broken up in 1713.
- HMS Sophia was a vessel of 52 tons (bm) that the Royal Navy purchased in June 1804 for service as a fire vessel and then sold in 1807 after she had been laid up at Woolwich since her purchase.
- HMS Sophia, of 308 tons (bm), was one of over 20 vessels that the Royal Navy purchased in April 1809 for use in a fireship attack at the Battle of the Basque Roads and expended there.
- HMS Sophia (1850) was a vessel of 150 tons (bm) that the Admiralty acquired on 5 November 1850 for use as a discovery vessel and then sold on 5 May 1853.

== See also ==
- HMS Sophie
