= HMS Sophie =

Three vessels of the British Royal Navy have borne the name Sophie:

- HMS Sophie (1782) was a French merchantman of 802 tons (bm) that HMS Warwick captured in 1782. The Royal Navy took her into service as a sixth rate, but then sold her in 1784.
- HMS Sophie (1798) was the French slaver Sophie launched in 1790 that became a privateer and that the French Navy requisitioned in 1794. HMS Endymion captured her in 1798. The Royal Navy took her into service. It broke her up in 1809.
- HMS Sophie (1809) was a Cruizer-class brig-sloop launched in 1809. The Royal Navy sold her in the Far East in 1825.

== See also ==
- HMS Sophia
