= Hugh Guion MacDonell =

British diplomat (1931–1904)

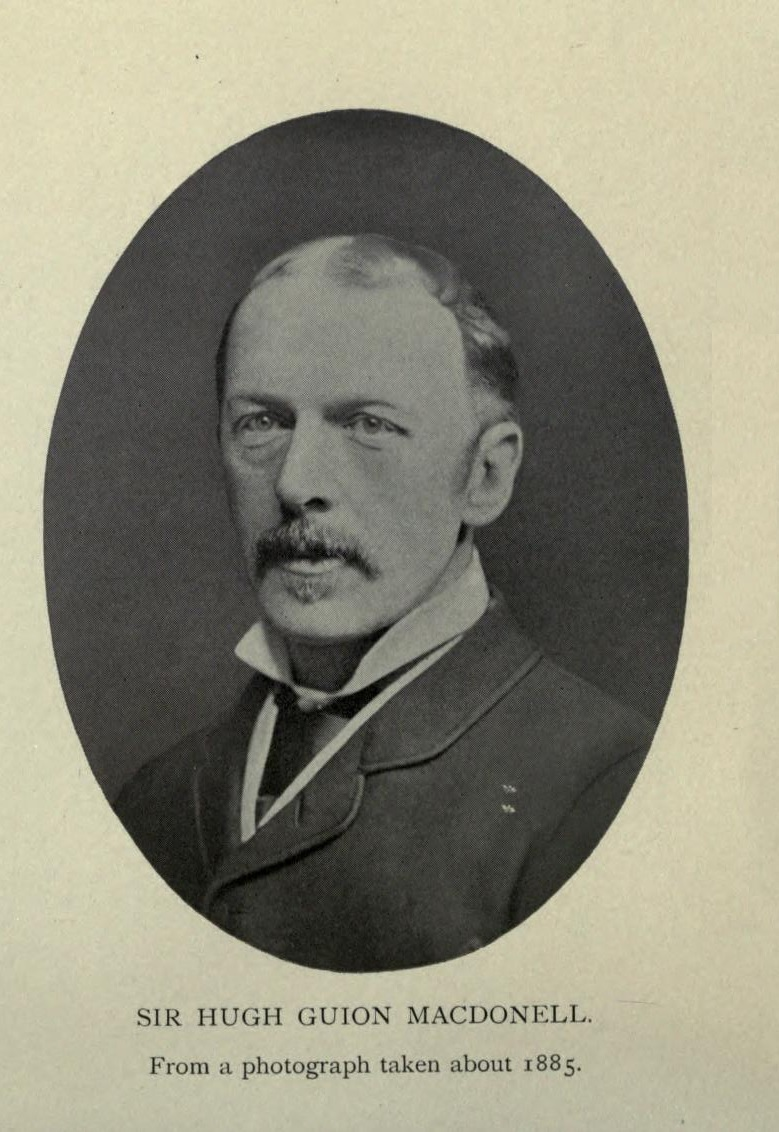
Photo taken from the book of his Wife, Anne Lumb Yates, "Reminiscences Of Diplomatic Life" 1913

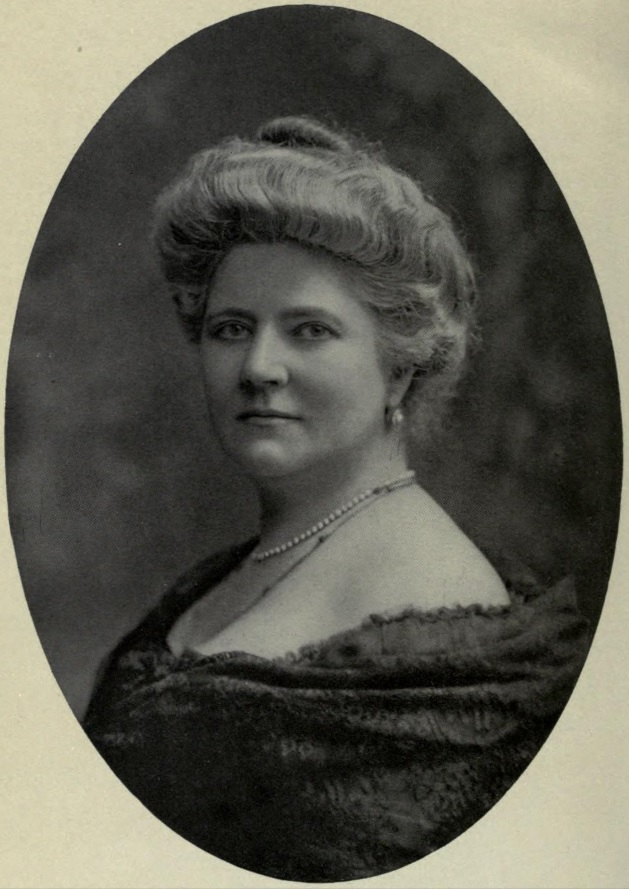
Picture of Anne Lumb, from her book "Reminiscences of Diplomatic Life" 1913

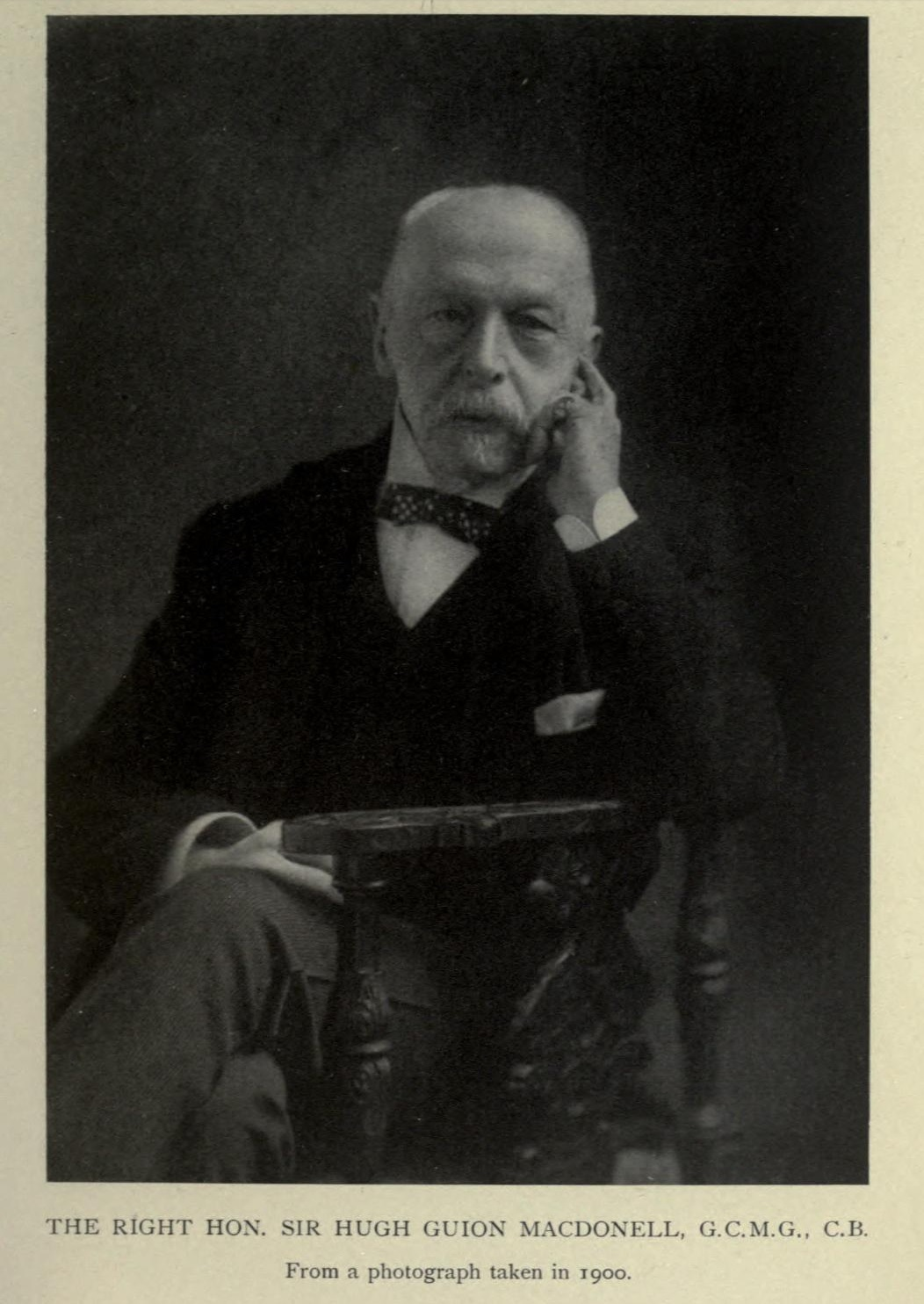
Sir Hugh Guion MacDonell in his last years 1900

Sir Hugh Guion MacDonell GCMG CB PC (5 March 1831, Florence, Grand Duchy of Tuscany – 25 January 1904, London) was a British diplomat who was envoy to Brazil, Denmark and Portugal.

== Background ==
MacDonell was born in Florence on 5 March 1831, the second son of the marriage of Hugh MacDonell of Aberchalder (Scottish Clan MacDonell of Glengarry) and Ida Louise Ulrich. He succeeded his brother Sir Alexander Frederick MacDonell in the representation of the family in the Glengarry Council in Canada. His eldest sister, married to the Alexandre Jean Aguado y Moreno, II Marqués de las Marismas del Guadalquivir, was Dame du Palais to the Empress Eugenie. Another sister, Ida MacDonell, married Don Augusto Conte y Lerdo de Tejada, Spanish Diplomant and Minister Plenipoteniary at Copenhagen.

== Life and career ==
MacDonell attended Royal Military College, Sandhurst, and was commissioned a second lieutenant in the Rifle Brigade on 22 December 1848, He served in British Kaffraria 1849–52, but retired from the army on account of ill-health in 1853 and joined the diplomatic service. He was attaché at Washington and Constantinople. In 1865 he was appointed to Rio de Janeiro as Second Secretary. He did not, however, go there, but took up a similar position at Copenhagen in the following years. He served successively at Buenos Aires, Madrid and Berlin where, in many occasions, he acted as Chargé d'Affaires. At Buenos Aires he met his wife, Anne Lumb (daughter of Edward Lumb of Wallington Lodge, Surrey). He was transferred to Rome in 1874, and was promoted to be Chargé d'Affaires at Munich in 1882. In 1885 he went as Envoy Extraordinary and Minister Plenipotentiary to Brazil. In 1888 he proceeded in a similar rank to the Court of Denmark. His last post was a posting as Envoy Extraordinary and Minister Plenipotentiary to Portugal in 1893, where he stayed until he retired on a pension in 1902.

The outbreak of war between Great Britain and the two South African republics in October 1899 raised some very difficult and delicate questions between Britain and Portugal, whose port at Delagoa Bay was directly connected with the Transvaal by rail and was the principal, if not the only, channel for supplies and external communications when access through the British colonies had been closed. MacDonell's management of the discussions on these subjects was tactful and conciliatory, and contributed in no small degree to the maintenance of cordial relations.

— Dictionary of National Biography

== Honours ==
MacDonell was appointed a Companion of the Order of the Bath (CB) in 1890, knighted as a Knight Commander of the Order of St Michael and St George (KCMG) in 1892 and raised to Knight Grand Cross of the order (GCMG) in 1899. He was appointed a Privy Counsellor on 11 August 1902, following an announcement of the King's intention to make this appointment in the 1902 Coronation Honours list published in June that year.

== Sources ==
- This article incorporates text from a publication now in the public domain: Lee, Sidney, ed. (1912). "MacDonell, Hugh Guion". Dictionary of National Biography (2nd supplement). London: Smith, Elder & Co.
- MACDONELL, Rt Hon. Sir Hugh Guion, Who Was Who, A & C Black, 1920–2014 (online edition, Oxford University Press, 2014)
- Sir Hugh Guion MacDonell, The Clan Donald, 1904
