= Henry Stanyford Blanckley =

British diplomat (1752–1828)

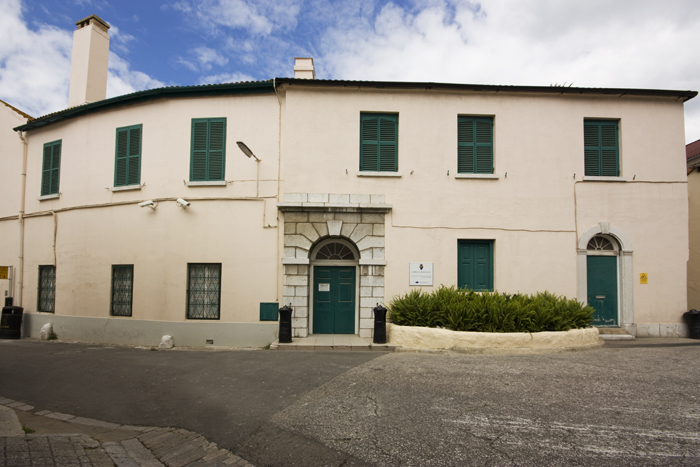
- Henry Stanyford Blanckley's place of birth: Ordnance House or "Bomb House", now home to the Gibraltar National Museum.
- Born: 29 September 1752; Gibraltar
- Died: 12 May 1828 (aged 75); Versailles
- Occupations: Officer of the 31st Regiment of Foot, captain 97th Regiment of Foot (1780), gamekeeper in Little Hallingbury, Essex, and British Consul to Menorca and Algiers.
- Writing career
- Period: 18th century, 19th century

Henry Stanyford Blanckley (29 September 1752) also known as HSB, was an officer of the 31st Regiment of Foot, captain of the 97th Regiment of Foot (1780), gamekeeper in Little Hallingbury, Essex, and British Consul for Menorca and Algiers. A variety of family stories attribute him as a descendant of Sir Walter Raleigh.

== Early life ==
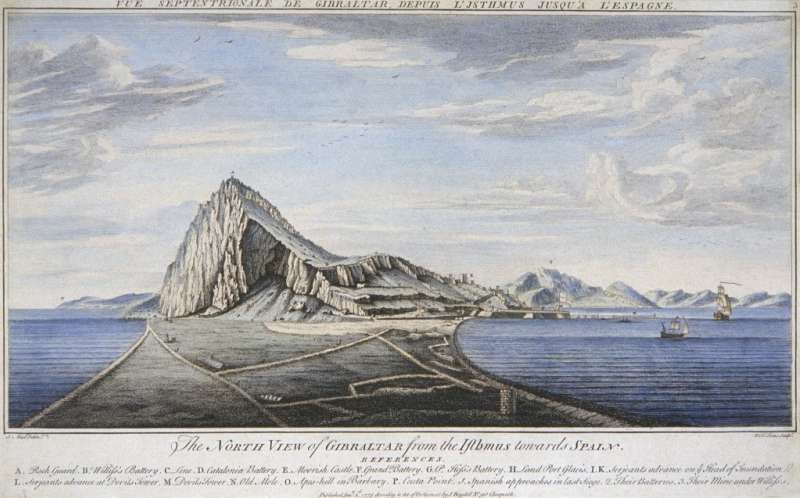
The North View of Gibraltar from the Isthmus towards Spain, 1775

HSB was born in Gibraltar on 29 September 1752 to Elizabeth and Henry Blanckley. His sister Ann Elizabeth Blanckley later married Alexander Shaw (British Army officer). Their father, Henry Blanckley, held the offices of Storekeeper, Clerk of the Cheque and Clerk of the Survey for Gibraltar Dockyard granting the family residence in the Ordnance House or "Bomb House", now home to the Gibraltar National Museum. According to Lieutenant Colonel Thomas James in his 1771 The History of the Herculean Straits the Blanckley's Gibraltar home was:

"The Bomb-House - The storekeeper and ordnance clerks dwellings, commonly called the bomb-house, was once a fine Moorish building : I take it to have been the residence of their governors, because I have seen the same kind of structures in Spain, and never but one in that style in each town: and that which is peculiar, is the top of the house, which is a flat oblong terrace; round it is a wall of three feet high, and on the wall are stone pillars that support a roof: there houses are much higher than any other building in the town, and command the whole: this upper apartment is at prevent a dwelling room, the spaces between the pillars being filled, and now has windows, and a door place. The cellars remain in their old state, one of which I take to have been the family mosque; the inside is an oblong square, and round the centre are pillars that support a handsome cupola.

Round the architrave is an inscription, but so defaced that I could not make anything of it. This house, when we took the place, was quite entire, and very large; and the complete remains of the Moors, as a dwelling, in the town; but the changes it has since undergone, have almost diverted it of its ancient beauties; ancient I call it, because it might have been built soon after the coming of those people in seven hundred and eleven . . . ."

HSB's father, Henry Blanckley, died in 1773.

== 31st Regiment of Foot ==
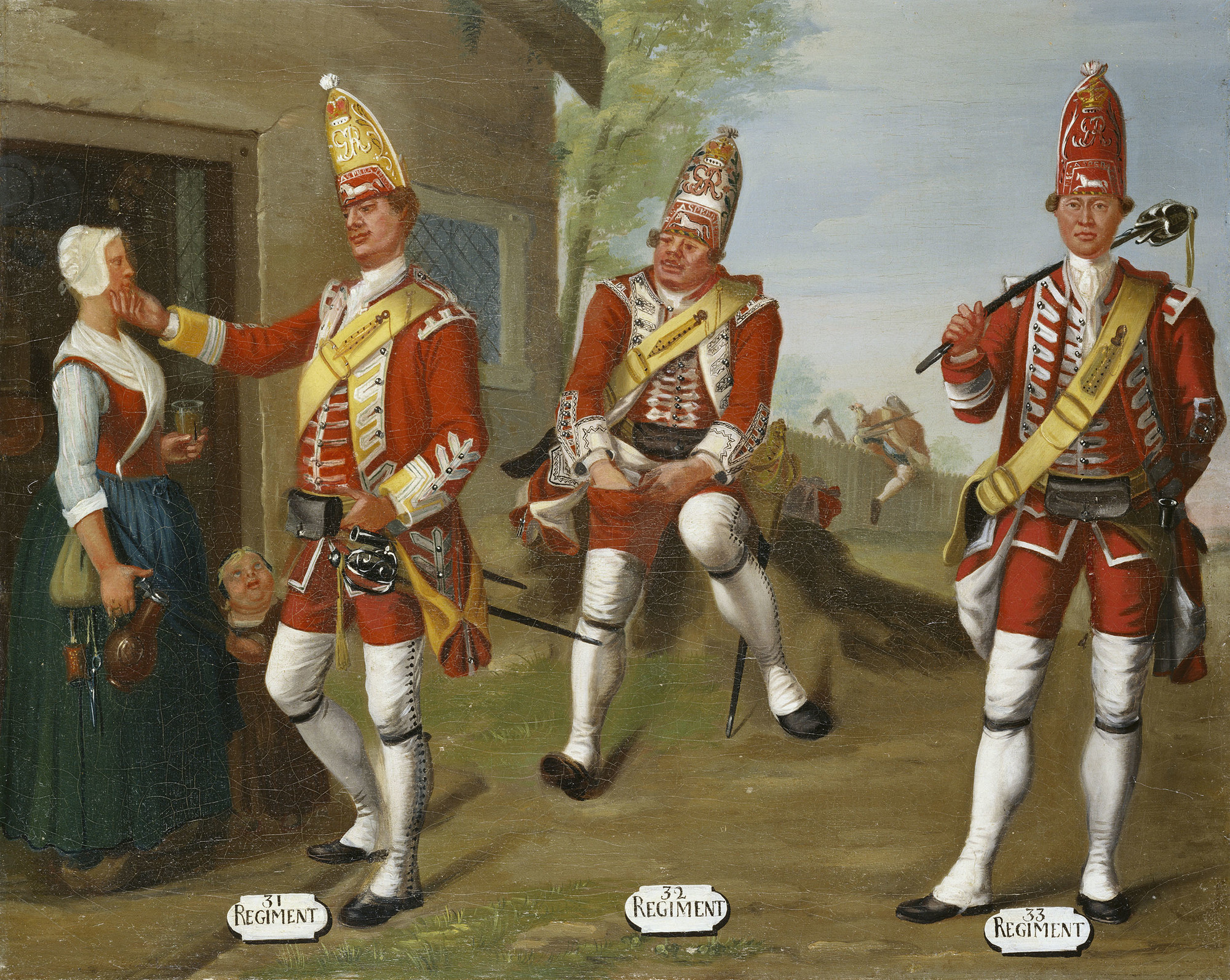
David Morier (1705^-70) - Grenadiers, 31st, 32nd and 33rd Regiments of Foot, 1751 - RCIN 405590 - Royal Collection

In 1777, HSB, an ensign of the 31st Regiment of Foot, sought promotion by requesting permission to purchase the lieutenancy of Alexander Hamilton, who had quit the regiment. The 31st Foot were stationed in North America for the American Revolutionary War and had garrisoned Quebec the previous year:

"The 31st sailed west again in 1776 to garrison Quebec during the War of American Independence. The flank companies served under General Burgoyne and were forced to surrender at Saratoga. They served in Canada for eleven years before returning home."

== Marriage to Mary Rogers ==
HSB's father, Henry Blanckley's will was proved on 10 March 1777, four years after his death. He bequeathed everything to his wife Elizabeth, who married Charles MacKintosh in St Pancras Old Church, London on 26 September 1778. Saunder's News Letter records HSB's own marriage six-months later, in March 1779, at Coolyduff, Inniscarra, Cork, Ireland.

"At Coolyduff, Henry Stanyford Blanckley, Esq; lieutenant in the 31st regiment of foot, to Miss Rogers, daughter of the late Capt. Rogers."

His bride was Mary Rogers, daughter of Captain Henry Rogers, who had been buried at Magourney, near Coolyduff, in 1773 Different lines of their descendants believed HSB and Mary Rogers to have been cousins.

== 97th Regiment of Foot ==
HSB was a captain of the 97th Regiment of Foot (1780) and made Brigade-major on 6 April 1882 during the Great Siege of Gibraltar.

== First children and gamekeeping in Little Hallingbury ==
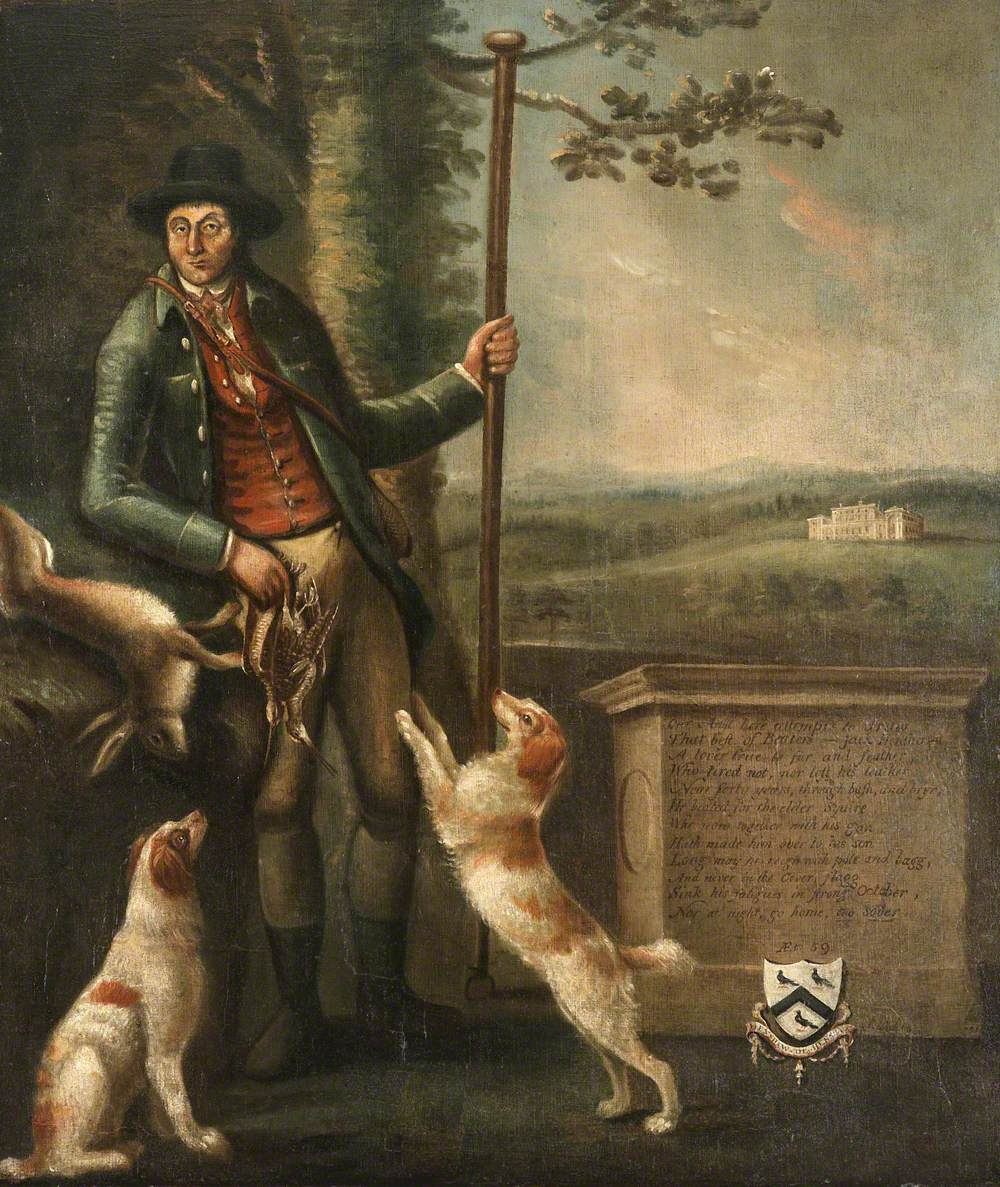
1791 portrait of a gamekeeper by John Walters (1721-1797)

HSB's first child was baptised Ann Blanckley in St Martin-in-the-Fields, Westminster, London on 5 March 1784. His first son, named Henry Stanyford Blanckley after him, was born on 5 August 1785, and baptised in Hatfield Peverel, Essex on 3 April 1785. His next three children, Maria (born 8 January 1787) and twins Charles and Caroline (born 3 September 1788) were baptised in the village of Little Hallingbury, Essex.

HSB is listed as a gamekeeper residing in Little Hallingbury in February 1786 and October 1787. According to historian George Redmonds, 18th century gamekeepers were often gentlemen:

"From 1671 lords of manors were authorised to employ one or more gamekeepers, and these men had the right to take and seize the guns, nets and other hunting * engines of unqualified persons, however wealthy they might be. In real terms sporting privilege had been transferred from the king to the landed gentry, and so had the preservation of the game. Not surprisingly, in such a tight-knit social group, there was a tendency to appoint gamekeepers from within their own ranks. In 1733, for example, Dame Anne Kaye of Woodsome Hall 'appointed Sir John Lister Kaye of Denby Grange her gamekeeper';6 in 1738 the Rev. Mr Philip Kitchon was 'appointed gamekeeper to Thomas Bright and Mrs Mary Lowther, for the Mannors of Marton, Tolthorpe and Nunthorp'.7 These were hardly gamekeepers as we now understand the word, but persons of considerable social status and this gave them the authority to confiscate weapons and enforce the property qualifications of the Game Acts."

HSB auctioned the contents of his Little Hallingbury house on 19 and 20 October 1789. The auction notice, entitled "A CATALOGUE Of all the neat and genteel Household Furniture, Fixtures, Brewing and Dairy Utensils, Beer Casks, about fifteen Loads of exceedingly good Meadow and Clover Hay, and other Valuable Effects The Property of CAPTAIN BLANKLEY Of Little Hallingbury, in the County of Essex", stated that he was leaving the country.

There are no subsequent records of the twins, Charles and Caroline. However, an 1889 letter written from HSB's granddaughter Mary Louisa Philippedes Cammenos to her first cousin Henriette Elizabeth Blanckley, says of their grandmother, Mary née Rogers:

"I have a letter, written to her by a friend, which carries the date 4 February 1790. In this letter are some expressions of tender sympathy with regard to the pain that was being suffered by our grandmother as a result of the illness of her daughter Eliza. I know that this young girl was very nearly ten years old when she died, and that it was of this illness to which the letter refers, whooping cough, from which several of our relatives died... it was following the death of Eliza and of three other children in the space of one month that the health of our grandmother was so altered that our grandfather left the military life and was nominated Consul to the Balearic Isles, and the two other children were born, the latter of which, if I am not mistaken, was the brother of Horace."

The above letter excerpt suggests that HSB and Mary née Rogers had two other children born in England, of whom one was named Eliza (born c. 1780), and that these, along with the twins Charles and Caroline, died in about 1789, prompting HSB to relocate his family to Menorca, where two more children were born, including HSB's only other son to survive into adulthood, Edward Blanckley.

== British Consulship in Menorca ==
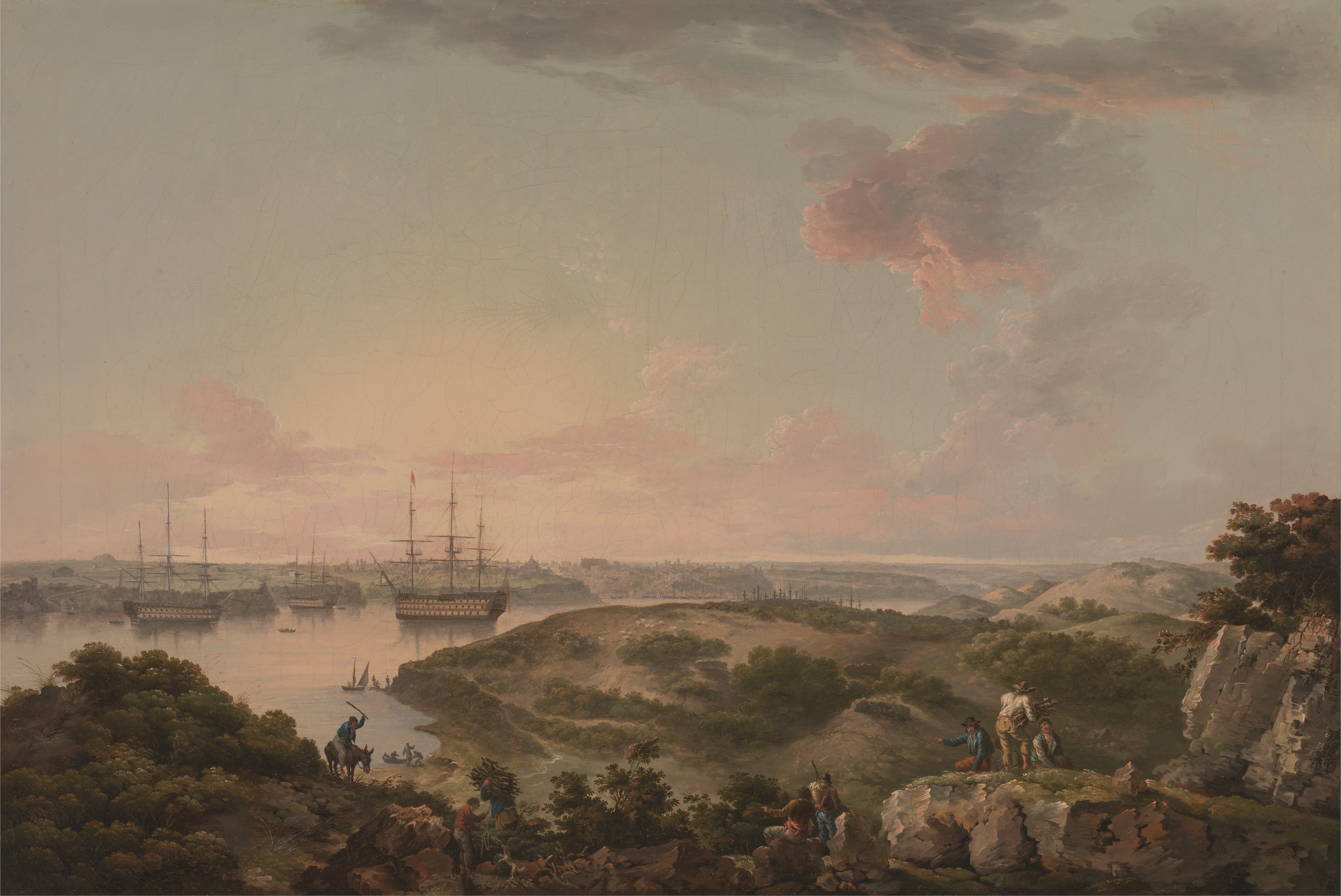
Port Mahon, Minorca with British men-of-war at anchor after its capture in 1798. By John Thomas Serres

Henry Stanyford Blanckley, was formally appointed British consul to Majorca, Menorca and Ibiza by George III in 1790. Conditions were hard for the native population of Menorca during his consulship in the 1790s. Britain's ceding of the island to Spanish rule in 1782 had resulted in strict sanctions being imposed on the Menorcans. These included heavy taxation, harsh trade restrictions, the banning of their Catalan language, and the imprisonment their men. Swarming rats and poor harvests added widespread famine to the islanders' plight Spain's switch of allegiance from Britain to France in 1796 closed Menorca to the British fleet, and faced the Blanckleys with an actively hostile government. In the summer of 1797, a plague spread rapidly across the Mediterranean from Constantinople, Corsica and the Barbary Coast, causing Britain to impose a strict quarantine in which all vessels were banned from visiting Menorca. HSB's wife Mary fell gravely ill and went first to the spas of Bath then "in her last recourse". to Bristol Hotwells, where she died on 10 March 1798.

== Second marriage ==
HSB married his second wife, Mary Richards, in Sulham, Berkshire, England on 13 March 1800, resulting in two daughters, Elizabeth (who in 1839 authored Six Years Residence in Algiers, a biographical account of HSB's time as British Consul to Algiers,) and Henrietta.

== Meeting with Vice-Admiral Horatio Nelson ==
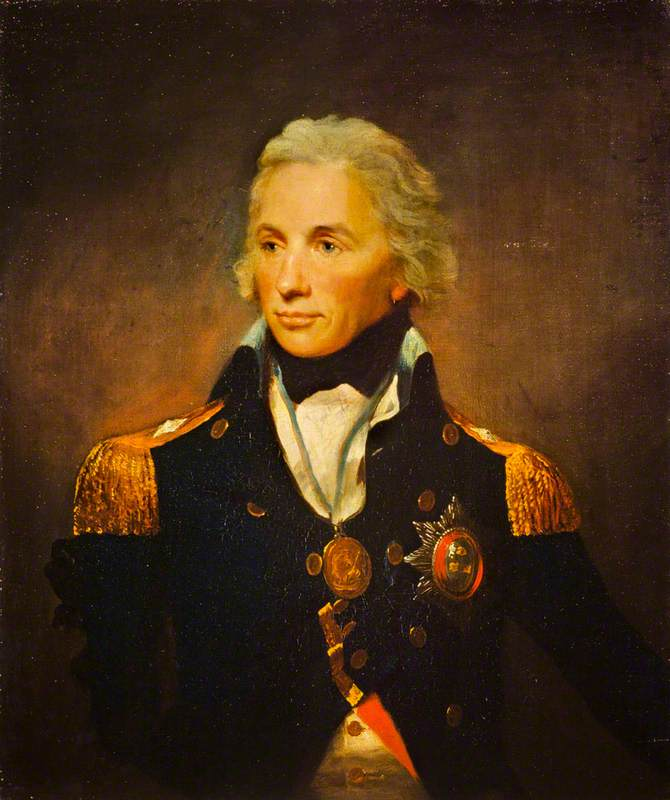
Horatio Nelson by Lemuel Francis Abbott (1760-1803)

As the Napoleonic Wars progressed, Spain had grown increasing hostility towards Britain, and Menorca's Spanish governor, Ramirez, imposed increasingly strict sanctions on the Blanckleys. He issued a public order forbidding Menorcan people to visit or communicate with them, and placed HSB under house arrest. His butler was stabbed in the arm with a bayonet when the guards posted at his front door mistook him for HSB. His youngest son, Edward Blanckley joined the Royal Navy as midshipman on 17 January 1805. HSB sought British aid to evacuate the rest of his family from Menorca, and was informed that the 38-gun frigate Seahorse would collect them. However, according to his daughter Elizabeth Broughton's later account, Governor Ramirez compelled the Blanckleys to:

"embark on a wretched boat, at the risk of our lives, for he would not permit us to await the frigate, which we were hourly expecting".

HSB stuffed the "wretched boat" with furniture and animals (including a pair of matched coach horses to prevent the Spanish having them) and hung its mast with international flags to make it look diplomatic and non-combative as they limped through the stormy Mediterranean warzone. Elizabeth Broughton claims they stumbled across the British fleet, and Vice-Admiral Horatio Nelson, upon spying them, declared:

"Good God, it must be Mr. Blanckley, and the Sea Horse [sic] has missed him. Send a boat on board, and with my compliments, beg him to come to me immediately."

Elizabeth Broughton continues:

"As soon as my father entered his cabin, he met him with extended hand. "How, my dear Sir, could you in such weather trust yourself in such a nutshell ? Where is your family ?" When my father replied that we were all on board, he lifted up his hand and eyes in astonishment, and added, " I give you my word, I sent you the very first frigate I had under my command. The Sea-horse had only returned to the fleet, the very day I dispatched her to you. I am sadly crippled for want of small craft;"—and then beating up, with his one noble hand, the cushions of the sofa, he made my father sit beside him, adding, " But I will not say one word more, until you tell me what I shall send Mrs Blanckley for her supper." My father assured him that she was amply provided; and enumerated all the live stock we had on board, and among other things, a pair of English coach-horses, which, to our no trifling inconvenience, he had embarked, and stowed on board; —" for if I could not have managed to bring them, I would rather have cut their throats, than that a Spanish dragoon should mount them," was my father's concluding sentence. Lord Nelson laughed heartily at the enumeration of all my father's retinue, exclaiming, " A perfect Noah's ark, my dear Sir —A perfect Noah's ark !"

Lord Nelson's venerable parent was a very dear friend of my father's. Hence a more than ordinary interest was felt by his son in all that related to my father and his family; and although this was their first meeting, they had long corresponded on terms of intimacy. An end was put to all conversation of a private nature, by my father telling his Lordship that he believed he could give him news of the French fleet. The countenance of the hero lighted up, and starting suddenly up, he instantly rung the little hand-bell on his table,—" Let a council of war be called immediately." I cannot, in my lamented ignorance, repeat all the details my father gave of that meeting of heroes;but I well remember, whatever was the communication he imparted, that he could not persuade Nelson of its authenticity; for his repeated reply was, " You have been deceived, my dear Sir; I am better informed. I know that they are bound for Egypt, for they had Saddles on board." I know not what the result would have been, had he received and acted upon my father's report; but well do I remember, whenever my father alluded to that national calamity, the death of the greatest of Britannia's sons, his sorrowful exclamations of regret, that Nelson had not believed the account he had given of the movements of the enemy. Upon the subject of the capture of Minorca being next started in the Council, Lord Nelson called for " Mr Blanckley's own plans for the taking of that island." After these plans had been spread on the cabin table, and examined, Lord Nelson said, " Now, Mr Blanckley, when I have settled my business with the fleet, you must go with us to Minorca, and that will be ours in the course of twenty-four hours, and in the next twenty-four hours we will have taken Majorca, to be a cabbage-garden for you."––Such was the playful manner of the hero of a thousand battles."

"Before my father left the Victory, to proceed to Cagliari, Lord Nelson addressed a letter to the Prince Regent of Sardinia, recommending my father, in the warmest terms, to his Royal Highness; and lie assured my father, that the Sea-Horse, immediately on its return, should be sent to convey us from Cagliari to Malta"

Horatio Nelson wrote to HSB on 28 March 1805:

"I send the first transport to receive your baggage and to carry you to Malta […] your long quarantine at Cagliari must have been very irksome."

== British Consulship in Algiers ==
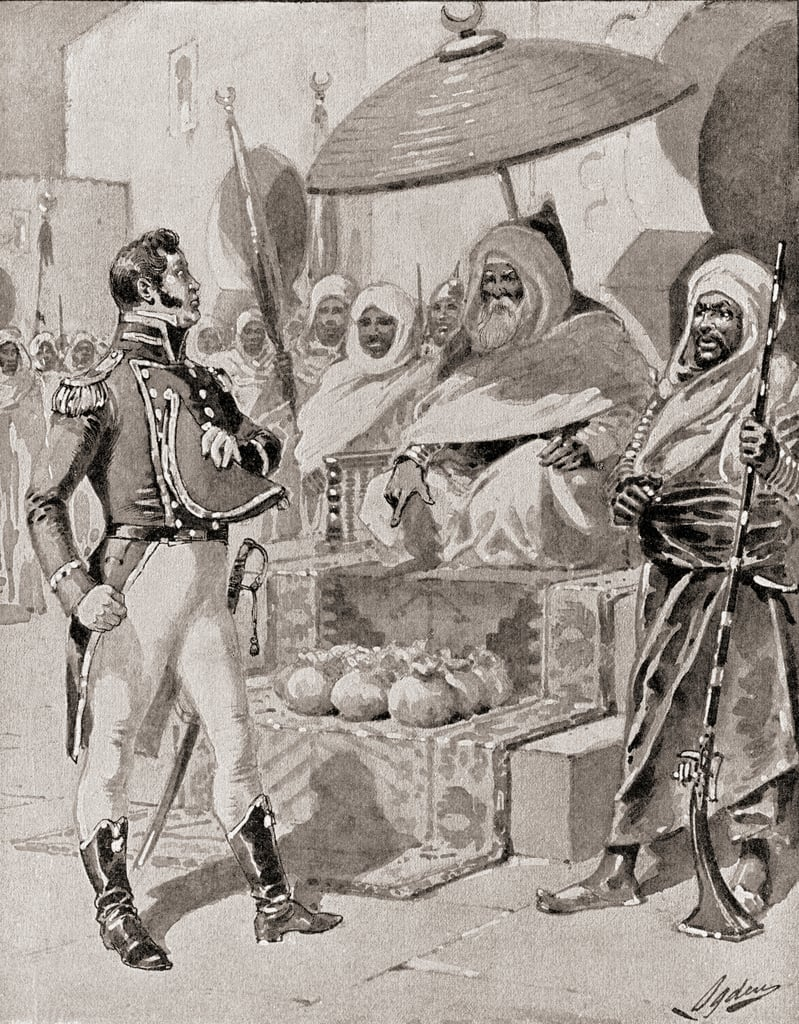
The American Commander William Bainbridge paying tribute to the Dey of Algiers, circa 1800

HSB was British Consul to Algiers from 1806 until 1812. When HSB first met the Dey of Algiers, on 30 September 1806, he refused to salute the Dey's hand, explaining that he reserved that homage for his own sovereign, George III. The Dey, responded by good-humouredly holding out his hand, and shaking HSB's "very heartily." His daughter, Elizabeth, states:

"From that moment was my dear father's popularity established. His gracious and firm deportment, his fine countenance and noble presence, ensured universal respect."

Elizabeth Broughton, however, elaborates that HSB was rarely received his salary from the British government:

"For five of the years of my father's residence at Algiers, he never received a farthing's salary. All the emolument that he had for his arduous duties, was the usual fees upon the entrance of ships connected with Great Britain, (I do not know the exact term,) and his trifling salary as Consul of the Balearic Islands, which appointment he continued to hold, (his Vice-Consuls in the different Islands acting for him.)"

HSB appointed his son-in-law Lewis Hippolytus Joseph Tonna (the husband of his daughter Maria) as his secretary in Algiers on 9 October 1806. He employed another son-in-law, Edward Dalzel, the husband of his eldest daughter, Ann, as a clerk. The Dalzels lived in a house adjoining the Blanckley's family villa. The Blanckleys lived in a lavish Moroccan-style clifftop house called Villa Brossette. Author Katie Hickman extrapolated a description of the Blanckley's family home in Algiers from Elizabeth Broughton's 1839 memoirs;

"Although the house was built in the Moorish manner, around an open courtyard, much of it was decorated in the English style…

Away from the cliffs, the house was surrounded by groves of fruit trees – pomegranates, almonds, orange and lemon trees, as well as the bergamot, or sweet lemon – in which nightingales sang. The fig trees bore fruit of such perfection that it had hitherto been considered fit for the Dey alone, while the apricots were so abundant that two of their pigs died from a surfeit of them. (It was not only the pigs who became over-excited at the prospect of so much wonderful fruit: a local synonym for apricot was ‘kill-Christians’.) Their vegetables grew in prodigious quantities, too. In her potager Elizabeth's mother grew cabbages, cauliflowers, broccoli, carrots, turnips, onions, leeks, peas, french beans, haricots blancs, artichokes, calabash, pumpkins, cucumbers, musk and watermelons, aubergines, tomatoes and several kinds of capsicums, okra, strawberries and potatoes.

The Blanckleys kept so many pets that their ‘Garden’ also became something of a Noah's ark. Their animals included a spaniel, a tortoise, a hare, a silver fox, a lamb, a tame gazelle and a goat called Phyllis. Mr Blanckley tried to keep wild cats, but they did not survive captivity. Nor did their pet lamb, which was eaten by jackals; nor their father's eagle, for whom an even worse fate was in store. One day, mistaking the bird for a guinea fowl, the cook killed it, plucked it, and hung it in their already well-filled Christmas larder. If Elizabeth and her sister had not missed it, no one was in any doubt that it would have been served up at table."

Hickman elaborates that HSB's main role in Algiers was to rescue British subjects from enslavement:

"It was against this background of domestic harmony that the Blanckleys’ most important work was carried out. While they survived the worst excesses of the Dey's regime, some of their countrymen were not so fortunate. One of Mr Blanckley's main duties in this ‘very nucleus of piracy’ was to claim any British national taken into slavery by the Algerians. He was able to do this under the terms of a treaty agreed with the Turkish Sultan in 1761, known as the Ottoman Capitulations, which also gave European consuls wide-reaching powers of jurisdiction over their countrymen in both civil and criminal cases, liberty of movement around the Dey's dominions, freedom from restrictions in commerce and religion, and (in theory at least) inviolability of domicile.

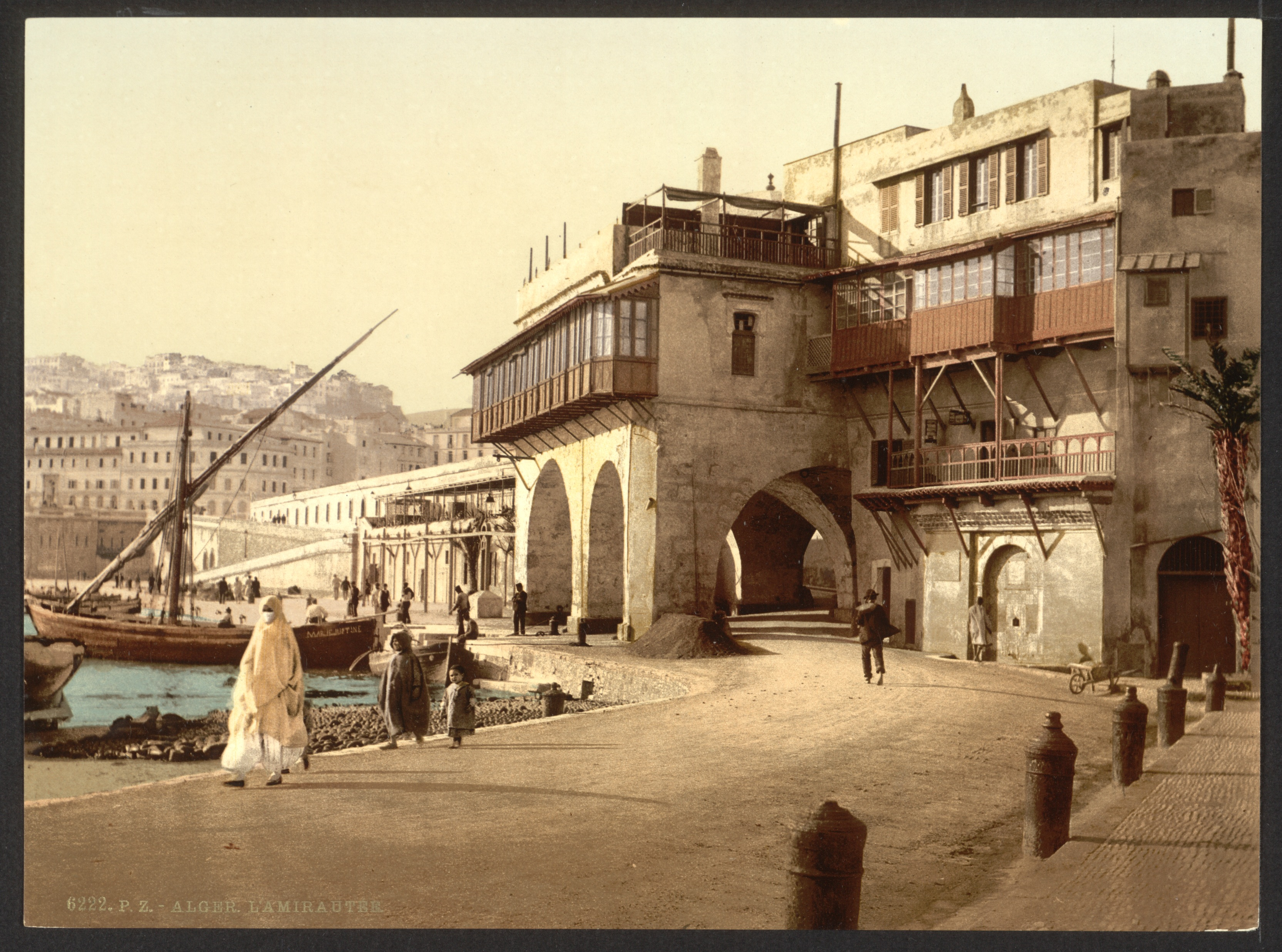
19th century photograph of Algiers

HSB's wife, Mary née Richards, cared for the former slaves he succeeded in liberating:

"After these captured Britons had been identified and set free, it was to Mrs Blanckley that the care of these unfortunates most frequently fell. Sometimes they were English sailors, or a handful of travellers on board a foreign passenger ship which had fallen into the hands of Algerian pirates. Sometimes they were the crew of an English merchant vessel captured on the high seas with its cargo of cotton, opium or oil. If the captain of one of these ships (who was often accompanied by his wife and family) was not properly insured his capture would spell certain ruin. At least he would have been allowed to keep a change of clothing; the rest of the crew on board such vessels were routinely stripped of everything they possessed, right down to their underclothes. Mrs Blanckley grew adept at making up not only extra beds, but also new shirts with which to clothe her destitute countrymen."

Hickam provides an example of the Blanckleys' work freeing and caring for formerly enslaved British sailors:

"On one occasion fifteen Englishmen were shipwrecked on the Barbary Coast, at a place called Gigery. The Blanckleys first received knowledge of their capture when a small piece of bluish-white paper was delivered to their house, much creased and soiled, on which a few scarcely legible lines had been scratched with charcoal and water. It told a distressing but all too familiar tale. The ship belonging to these English mariners, laden with a cargo of pigs of lead and barrels of gunpowder, had been on its way to one of the Mediterranean ports, when a storm had driven it onto the rocks. The ‘inhospitable savages’ who inhabited this remote piece of coast had overpowered the exhausted men and diverted them of everything, including all their clothes. Freezing with cold and half-starved, the fifteen men watched helplessly from the shore as, in their haste take possession of the ship's cargo, several of their captors tied pigs of lead to their waists, instantly sinking to their deaths as they attempted to swim back to shore. Another group later blew themselves up when they built a fire too close to one of the barrels of gunpowder. Perhaps anxious to be rid of these unlucky Christian devils, they were now demanding a large ransom. It was only with difficulty that the outraged Mr Blanckley could be made ‘to comprehend the truth of the Dey's reply, which was, that he had not the least command or influence with the men of Gigery … that they had ever continued a wild and completely savage people; and that had any Algerine subjects fallen into their hands, he, the Dey, would equally have been obliged to pay a ransom for their liberation.’ The compassionate Blanckleys paid the ransom from their own pocket, and a few days later the thirteen mariners – ‘two having sunk under their misery’ – arrived in Algiers. The men had scarcely a rag upon them, but Mrs Blanckley was well prepared and already had beds and clothing waiting for them. She tended their wounds and fed them, although her greatest anxiety over the following weeks was that ‘they might be injured by taking too great a quantity of food, after their long state of almost starvation; and she used great caution in having nourishment distributed to them.’ ‘In this, and in every other instance,’ Elizabeth wrote, ‘did my excellent parents act a part worthy of the good Samaritan; their house, their purse, and even their wardrobe, being opened and freely bestowed according to the wants of their unfortunate fellow-creatures."

== Life in Bath ==
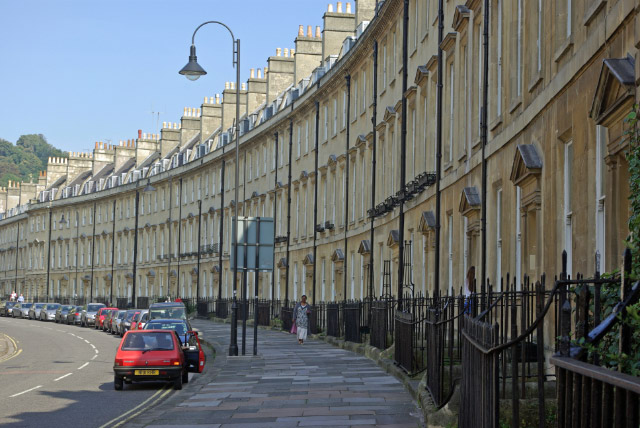
The Paragon, Bath

HSB ceased his diplomatic role in 1812 and returned to England with his wife and their two young daughters, Elizabeth and Henrietta. They resided at 8 The Paragon, Bath, Somerset in the home of his widowed maternal aunt Ann Harrison. HSB's mother, Mrs Elizabeth MacKintosh, had died in Bath in 1797. Her widower, Charles MacKintosh, had remained living in the city. In his will, proved 21 July 1804, he bequeathed the bulk of his annuities to his sister-in-law, Mrs Ann Harrison "whose attention to me and my interests has always been such as I never can sufficiently acknowledge" decreeing that she could continue living in his leased house in The Paragon for 3 months after his death.

When Ann Harrison died on 2 January 1814, HSB wrote to his daughter, Maria in Liverpool:

"8 Paragon Buildings, Bath 2nd Jan.y 1814
My dear Child,
Long have I wished to write to you but from the circumstances of my aunt's illness I could not take up my pen with satisfaction, & sorry am I at last to say that this morning she departed this life, it has much affected me[...] and am
Your affec.te Father
H. S. Blanckley
I wish to send you something to put you into mourning & will as soon as I am little more collected
H. S. B."

In November 1815, The Bath Chronicle and Weekly Gazette listed H.S. Blanckley Esq as a committee member appointed for the coming season for the Harmonic Society, whose patron was the Prince Regent

He wrote to Maria again the following year, on 23 April 1816, announcing his plan to emigrate to Europe on account of the previous three cold English winters in Bath having affected his health:

"Bath 23rd April 1816
My dear Maria,
As I now answer your little girls pretty letter, I would not miss the occasion of giving you a few lines, to tell you of my intention of quitting Bath principally on account of my health, as assuredly it does not agree with me; a third winter each of which I have been laid up in my bed; a proof of it is that when I am out of Bath I am quite well; last spring I went from this to London was absent four months, during that period I enjoyed perfect health. I had not returned here three days when I was taken and indeed more or less have continued down to this; the difficulty of getting rid of the lease has so long detained me, but have now surmounted it, by giving up the remaining two years to Mrs Bignall; the furniture I dispose or rather say give away to a broker, rather than be troubled with an auction.
Whither we proceed on leaving this [house] we have not determined, but for change of air towards the sea coast I fancy we shall ramble, most of the summer, and please God I mean to cheat an English winter by going somewhere to the southward on the Continent; in short no fix'd plan have we thought of. Ten or twelve days I fancy will finish our present residence[...]
Your affect.te Father
H. S. Blanckley"

== Retirement years in Europe ==
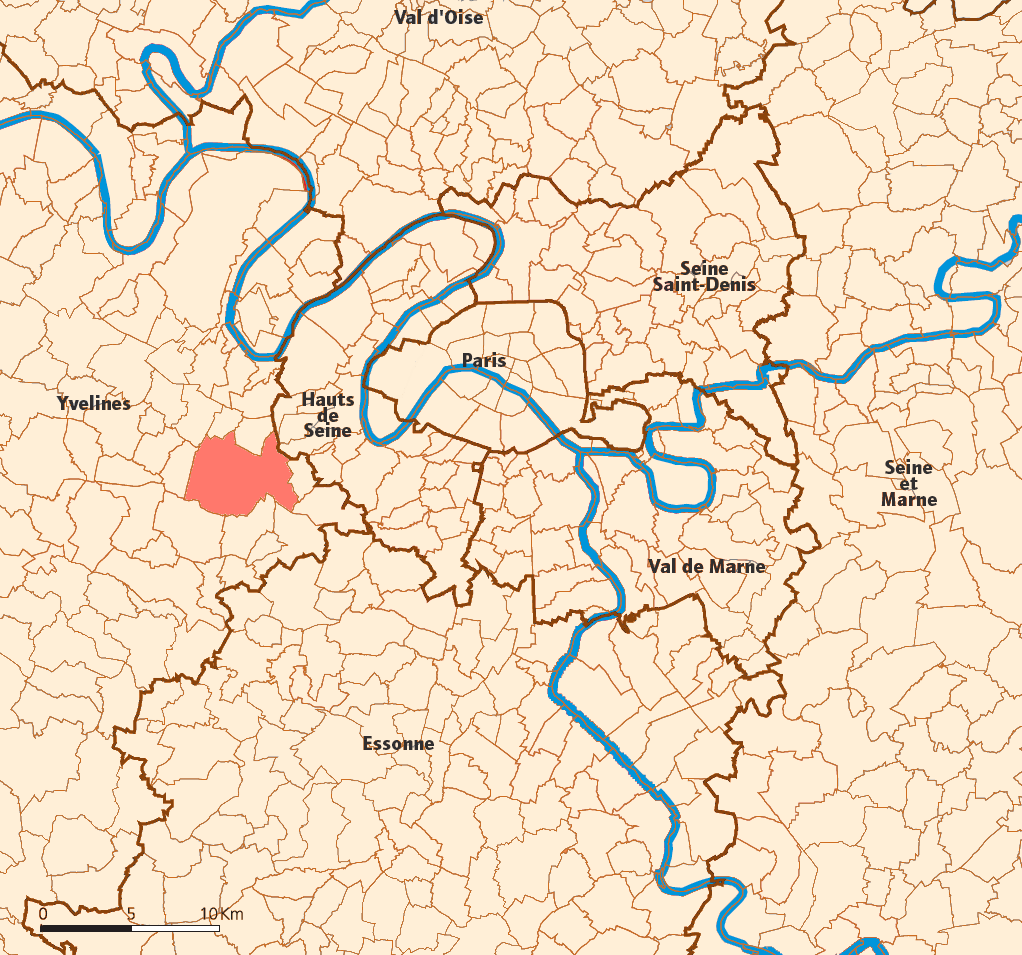
Location of Versailles (in red) within present day Paris

HSB travelled to Europe with second his wife, their young daughters, and his son from his first marriage, Edward Blanckley, in about 1816. The Blanckleys rented a house in Paris where they aided their friends the Matchams to find a rental property in Boulogne-Billancourt. The Matcham family were headed by George Matcham and his wife, Catherine, the sister of Horatio Nelson, 1st Viscount Nelson. The Matchams, at this time, had Horatio Nelson and Emma, Lady Hamilton's orphaned fifteen-year-old daughter Horatia Nelson as their ward. The Blanckleys and Matchams toured Europe together, and Edward Blanckley married Harriet Matcham in Naples in April 1819.

HSB died in Versailles on 12 May 1828. His Versailles memorial inscription read:

STANYFORD BLANCKLEY (Henry). Sacred to the memory of... who departed this life 12 May 1820 into which he was born 29 September 1752. Of the 75 years which he sejournedon earth, 47 were spent in the service of his country.––He was Brigade major at the memorable siege of Gibraltar, served many years in the American war, subsequently to which he was agent and consul general to his britanic majesty, at Algiers and in the Balearic Isles.

In testimony of his honorable career unsullied by a single stain, and closed, as it is hoped in the believing prospect of immortality, this monument has been erected by his afflicted and affectionate widow Mary Blanckley."

== Belief in descent from Sir Walter Raleigh ==
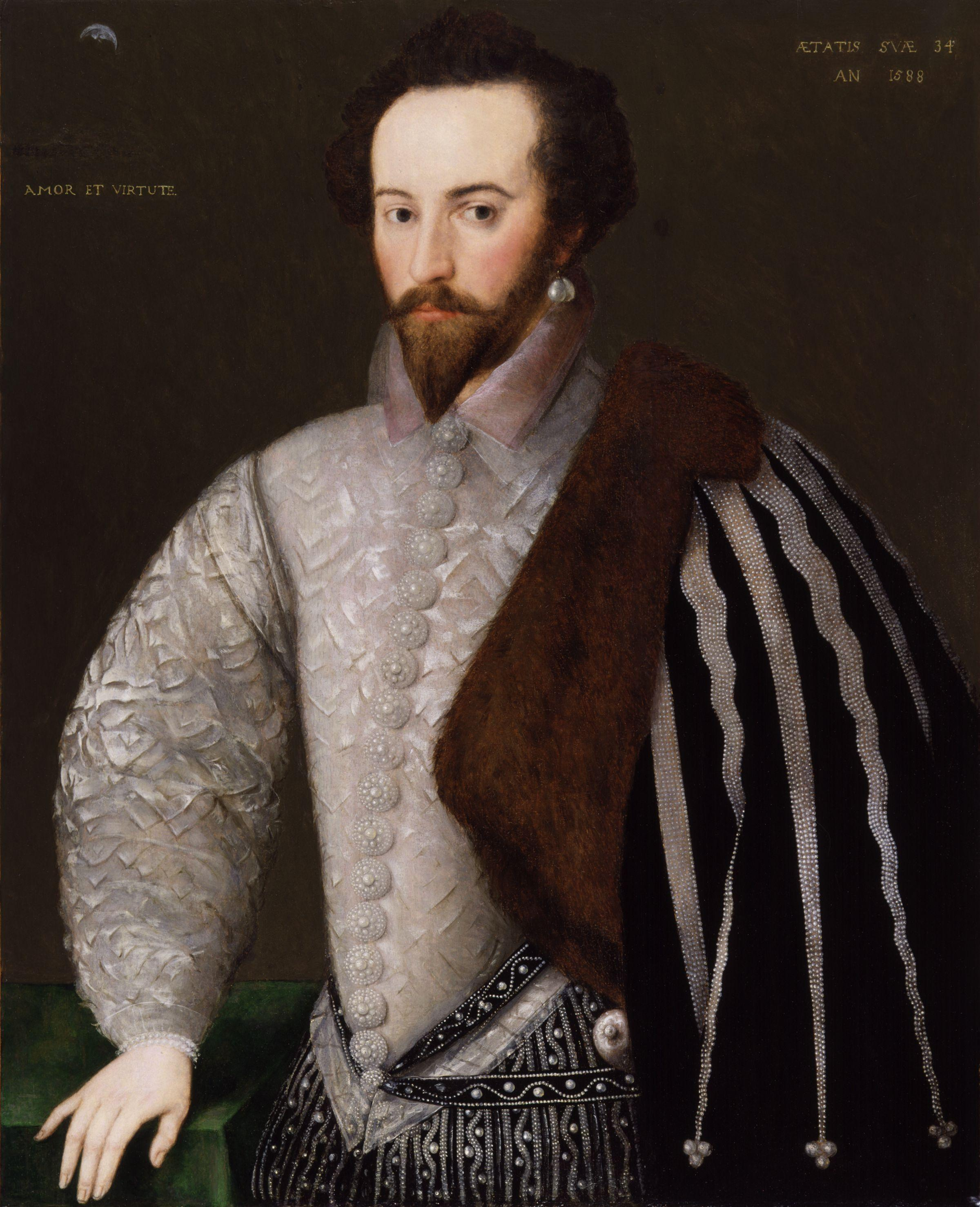
Sir Walter Raleigh in 1588

Several lines of HSB's descendants, as well as those of his sister Ann Elizabeth Shaw née Blanckley, believed HSB to have been descended from Sir Walter Raleigh. These accounts are:

1) Edward Blanckley's daughter Tori, (Catherine Nelson Parker Toriana Blanckley)'s 1927 obituary reads:

"LINK WITH RALEIGH AND NELSON. Mrs. Catherine Nelson Parker Toriana Ward, of Lutton, South Brent, a descendant of Sir Walter Raieigh, and a greatniece of Nelson, widow of Colonel William George Ward, who was also grandson of Nelson, left unsettled property in her own disposition of the gross value of £19,537."

2) Tori's daughter Ethel Mary Ward wrote to her niece in 1937:

"...in Ireland some property belonging to Sir W. Raleigh was mortgaged & the mortgages fell through in mother's grandfather's time. This grandfather was Major General Henry Stanyford Blanckley, he was Consul General in the Balearic Isles & knew Lord Nelson [...] I know this estate of Sir W. Raleigh that fell through in Ireland was called CoolyCusane... ...We did come down directly from the Raleigh line & the mortgages of some lands belonging to Sir Walter fell through in our great (your great great) grandfather's time."

3) HSB's granddaughter Mary Louisa Philippedes Cammenos wrote to her first cousin Henriette Elizabeth Blanckley in 1875:

" I know our grandmother had considerable property in Ireland, which was sold after our grandfather's second marriage, we have none of us had any of the proceeds...

...Lizzie told me that after the death of our aunt Henrietta, all the private papers left by our grandfather came into her possession. and that she had torn and burnt them all, including letters from our grandmother to our grandfather, as well as those from her own grandmother... ...I don't know Tory..."

Tory was her first cousin Catherine Nelson Parker Toriana Blanckley.

4) Alexander MacKintosh Shaw's 1877 "A Genealogical Account of the Shaws" states that Alexander Shaw (1740-1811) secondly married Anne Elizabeth, daughter of Henry Blanckley, noting:

"The Blanckleys were a Hampshire family, and representatives in the female line of the family of Raleigh, to which Sir Walter Raleigh belonged. They possessed various relics of that great man. The family of Blanckley is believed to be now extinct in the male line."

Ann Elizabeth was HSB's sister. She married Colonel Alexander Shaw on 11 February 1772 at St Pancras Chapel in London, after his return from the American Revolutionary War. This account pushes the Blanckley-Raleigh lineage tradition back as far as Ann Elizabeth and HSB's parents’ generation. The author's belief that the male Blanckley line had died out by the time of authorship in 1877 suggests that the Shaw's family story of descent from Raleigh was independent from stories held by Edward Blanckley's line, as his son, Horatio Charles Nelson Blanckley lived until 1899.

5) Lewis H. J. Tonna, the son of HSB's daughter Maria, wrote in 1854:

"My maternal grandfather, the late Henry Staniforth (or Stanyford) Blanckley, Esq., formerly a major in the army, and for many years consul-general in the Balearic Islands and at Algiers, was lineally descended from Sir Walter Raleigh, and possessed many interesting relics of his great ancestor. He also possessed some portion of Sir Walter's estates in the county of Cork; these, however, came to him with his wife, who was his first cousin, and also of the Raleigh line. Her name was Rogers. A small estate called Cooly-cussane is all that now remains in the Blanckley family of this Irish property. My grandfather possessed the ring which Sir Walter wore on the scaffold, and it is now in the possession of his eldest son's son, Captain Edward James Blanckley, of the 6th Foot. He also had an iron-gilt despatch-box, covered with velvet, once crimson; this, together with Sir Walter's teapot of red earth, silver mounted, went to his younger son, the late Captain Edward Blanckley, RN., and both articles are now in the hands of his widow."

HSB's step-father, Charles MacKintosh noted in his will, proved on 21 July 1804, that he had previously given his stepson Henry Blankley [sic] Henry Blankley "the use of a tea kettle" from his late wife's estate:

"I desire that my carriage and horses may be sold immediately after my death and all my household furniture and the liquors in my cellar within the space of three months thereafter and neat product remitted for my account to my friend Mr Simon Fraser of Kings Arms Yard London excepting my plate the whole of which as it belonged to my late wife before our marriage I leave to her two children, my step son and step daughter aforesaid in equal shares and be it observed that I delivered to my stepson Henry Blankley the use of a tea kettle and lamp which must be considered as part of his half share thereof."
