= List of ships of World War II (S) =

Military vessels during Second World War

The List of ships of the Second World War contains major military vessels of the war, arranged alphabetically and by type. The list includes armed vessels that served during the war and in the immediate aftermath, inclusive of localized ongoing combat operations, garrison surrenders, post-surrender occupation, colony re-occupation, troop and prisoner repatriation, to the end of 1945. For smaller vessels, see also list of World War II ships of less than 1000 tons. Some uncompleted Axis ships are included, out of historic interest. Ships are designated to the country under which they operated for the longest period of the Second World War, regardless of where they were built or previous service history. Submarines show submerged displacement.

Click on headers to sort column alphabetically.

List of ships of World War II (S)
Ship	Country or organization	Class	Type	Displacement (tons)	First commissioned	Fate
Sackville	Royal Canadian Navy	Flower	corvette	925	30 December 1941	paid off 8 April 1946
Safari	Royal Navy	S	submarine	814	14 March 1942	sank under tow 8 January 1946
Saginaw Bay	United States Navy	Casablanca	escort carrier	7,800	2 March 1944	decommissioned 19 June 1946, scrapped 1960
Saguenay	Royal Canadian Navy	A	destroyer	1,337	21 May 1931	paid up July 1945
Sahib	Royal Navy	S	submarine	814	13 May 1942	sunk 24 April 1943
Saint John	Royal Canadian Navy	River	frigate	1,445	13 December 1943	paid off 27 November 1945
Saintes	Royal Navy	Battle	destroyer	2,325	27 September 1946	paid off May 1962, scrapped 1972
Sakura	Imperial Japanese Navy	Matsu	destroyer	1,262	25 November 1944	sunk by mine 11 July 1945
Salamaua	United States Navy	Casablanca	escort carrier	7,800	26 May 1944	decommissioned 9 May 1946, scrapped 1947
Salerno Bay	United States Navy	Commencement Bay	escort carrier	10,900	19 May 1945	scrapped October 1961
Salisbury	Royal Navy; Royal Canadian Navy	Town	destroyer	1,190	5 December 1940	to Canada September 1942, paid off 10 December 1943, scrapped 1944
Salmon	Royal Navy	S	submarine	670	8 March 1935	sunk 9 July 1940
Salt Lake City	United States Navy	Pensacola	heavy cruiser	9,100	11 December 1929	sunk as target 1948
Salvia	Royal Navy	Flower	corvette	925	20 September 1940	sunk on 24 December 1941 by U-568
Samphire	Royal Navy	Flower	corvette	925	30 June 1941	30 January 1943
Sampson	United States Navy	Somers	destroyer	1,850	19 August 1938	scrapped 1946
Samuel B. Roberts	United States Navy	Butler	destroyer escort	1,370	28 April 1944	sunk 25 October 1944 during the Battle off Samar
San Diego	United States Navy	Atlanta	light cruiser	6,000	10 January 1942	decommissioned 1946, scrapped 1960
San Francisco	United States Navy	New Orleans	heavy cruiser	9,950	10 February 1934	Decommissioned 10 February 1946, scrapped 1959
San Giorgio	Regia Marina	San Giorgio	heavy cruiser	10,167	1 July 1910	decommissioned 22 January 1941
San Jacinto	United States Navy	Independence	light aircraft carrier	11,000	15 November 1943	decommissioned 1 March 1947, scrapped 1972
San Juan	Argentine Navy	Buenos Aires	destroyer	1,375	23 March 1938	Discarded 1973
San Juan	United States Navy	Atlanta	light cruiser	6,000	28 February 1942	decommissioned 1946, scrapped 1961
San Luis	Argentine Navy	Buenos Aires	destroyer	1,375	23 March 1938	Discarded 3 May 1971
San Marcos	United States Navy	Casa Grande	Dock landing ship	7,930	15 April 1945	Transferred to Spain, 1 July 1971
Sangamon	United States Navy	Sangamon	escort carrier	24,275	25 August 1942	decommissioned 24 October 1945, scrapped August 1960
Santa Cruz	Argentine Navy	Buenos Aires	destroyer	1,375	26 September 1938	Discarded 1973
Santa Fe	United States Navy	Cleveland	light cruiser	11,800	24 November 1942	scrapped 1959
Santee	United States Navy	Sangamon	escort carrier	24,275	24 August 1942	decommissioned 21 October 1946, scrapped 1960
São Paulo	Brazilian Navy	Minas Geraes	battleship	19,200	12 July 1910	Sold 1951
Saracen	Royal Navy	S	submarine	814	27 June 1942	sunk 14 August 1943
Saratoga	United States Navy	Lexington	aircraft carrier	33,000	16 November 1927	sunk as a target 1946
Sargent Bay	United States Navy	Casablanca	escort carrier	7,800	9 March 1944	decommissioned 23 June 1946, scrapped 1959
Saskatoon	Royal Canadian Navy	Flower	corvette	925	9 June 1941	paid off 25 June 1945
Satterlee	United States Navy	Gleaves	destroyer	1,630	1 July 1943	Decommissioned 16 March 1946, scrapped 1972
Satyr	Royal Navy	S	submarine	814	8 February 1943	to French Navy February 1952
Saumarez	Royal Navy	S	destroyer	1,710	1 July 1943	scrapped 1950
Sava	Royal Yugoslav Navy	Temes	river monitor	440	15 April 1920	paid off 1962
Savage	Royal Navy	S	destroyer	1,710	8 June 1943	scrapped 1962
Savannah	United States Navy	Brooklyn	light cruiser	9,475	10 March 1938	scrapped 1966
Savo Island	United States Navy	Casablanca	escort carrier	7,800	3 February 1944	decommissioned 12 December 1946, scrapped 1960
Saxifrage	Royal Navy	Flower	corvette	925	6 February 1942	
Sceptre	Royal Navy	S	submarine	814	April 1943	paid off February 1947
Scharnhorst	Kriegsmarine	Scharnhorst	battleship	32,000	7 January 1939	sunk 26 December 1943
Schlesien	Kriegsmarine	Deutschland	battleship	14,218	5 May 1908	blown up 4 May 1945
Schleswig-Holstein	Kriegsmarine	Deutschland	battleship	14,218	6 July 1908	scrapped after 1946
Shubrick	United States Navy	Gleaves	destroyer	1,630	7 February 1943	scrapped 1947
Scipione Africano	Regia Marina	Capitani Romani	light cruiser (also known as exploratori oceanici)	3,750	September 1942	to France as war reparations 1947; struck 1961; scrapped 1979
Scorpion	Royal Navy	S	destroyer	1,710	11 May 1943	paid off 16 August 1945
Scourge	Royal Navy	S	destroyer	1,710	14 July 1943	to Netherlands 1 February 1946
Scylla	Royal Navy	Dido	anti-aircraft cruiser	5,600	12 June 1942	declared constructive total loss 23 June 1944, scrapped May 1950
Sea Cliff	Royal Canadian Navy	River	frigate	1,445	26 September 1944	paid off 28 November 1945
Seadog	Royal Navy	S	submarine	814	24 September 1942	paid off 24 December 1947
Sealion	Royal Navy	S	submarine	670	16 March 1934	scuttled 13 March 1945
Sea Nymph	Royal Navy	S	submarine	814	3 November 1942	paid off 1945; scrapped 1948
Searcher	Royal Navy	Ruler	escort carrier	14,400	3 April 1943	paid off 1945; sold 1952; scrapped April 1976
Sea Rover	Royal Navy	S	submarine	814	7 July 1943	paid off October 1949
Seawolf	Royal Navy	S	submarine	670	12 March 1936	scrapped 1946
Seeadler	Kriegsmarine	Raubvogel	torpedo boat	1,290	1 May 1927	sunk 13 May 1942
Selfridge	United States Navy	Porter	destroyer	1,850	25 November 1936	scrapped 1947
Semmes	United States Navy	Clemson	destroyer	1,250	21 February 1920	scrapped 25 November 1946
Sendai	Imperial Japanese Navy	Sendai	light cruiser	5,195	29 April 1924	sunk 2 November 1943
Seraph	Royal Navy	S	submarine	814	27 June 1942	paid off 25 October 1962
Serapis	Royal Navy	S	destroyer	1,710	1943	to Netherlands in October 1943 as Piet Hein; broken up 1962
Serrano	Chilean Navy	Serrano	destroyer	1,090	1928	1962
Settsu Maru	Imperial Japanese Army	M Type A	landing craft carrier		January 1945	Scrapped post war
Seydlitz	Kriegsmarine	Enlarged Admiral Hipper	heavy cruiser	14,680	not completed	became Weser (Germany)
Sęp	Polish Navy	Orzeł	submarine	1,100	16 April 1939	decommissioned 15 September 1969
Shadwell	United States Navy	Casa Grande	Dock landing ship	7,930	24 July 1944	Scrapped 2017
Shah	Royal Navy	Ruler	escort carrier	11,400	27 September 1943	paid off 7 February 1946
Shakespeare	Royal Navy	S	submarine	814	10 July 1942	paid off 14 July 1946
Shamrock Bay	United States Navy	Casablanca	escort carrier	7,800	15 March 1944	decommissioned 6 July 1946, scrapped 1958
Shangri-La	United States Navy	Essex	aircraft carrier	30,800	15 September 1944	decommissioned 30 July 1971, scrapped 1988
Shark	Royal Navy	S	submarine	670	31 December 1934	sunk 6 July 1940
Shaw	United States Navy	Mahan	destroyer	1,450	18 September 1936	scrapped 1946
Shawinigan	Royal Canadian Navy	Flower	corvette	925	19 September 1941	sunk 25 November 1944
Shediac	Royal Canadian Navy	Flower	corvette	925	8 July 1941	paid off 28 August 1945
Sherbrooke	Royal Canadian Navy	Flower	corvette	925	5 June 1941	paid off 28 June 1945
Shillong	Royal Indian Navy	Basset	minesweeper	529	1941–1944	1941–1944
Shimane Maru	Imperial Japanese Navy	Special 1TL Type	escort carrier	11,989	28 February 1945	sunk 24 July 1945
Shinano	Imperial Japanese Navy	Yamato	aircraft carrier	64,800	19 November 1944	sunk 29 November 1944
Shin'yō	Imperial Japanese Navy		escort carrier	17,500	15 November 1943	sunk 17 November 1944
Shinshū Maru	Imperial Japanese Army	Shinshū Maru	landing craft carrier	7,100	15 November 1934	sunk 3 January 1945
Shipley Bay	United States Navy	Casablanca	escort carrier	7,800	21 March 1944	decommissioned 28 June 1946, scrapped 1960
Shōhō	Imperial Japanese Navy	Zuihō	light carrier	11,260	30 November 1941	sunk 8 May 1942
Shōkaku	Imperial Japanese Navy	Shōkaku	aircraft carrier	25,675	8 August 1941	sunk 19 June 1944
Siboney	United States Navy	Commencement Bay	escort carrier	10,900	14 May 1945	scrapped 1971
Sibyl	Royal Navy	S	submarine	814	16 August 1942	scrapped 1948
Sickle	Royal Navy	S	submarine	814	1 December 1942	likely sunk June 1944
Sikh	Royal Navy	Tribal	destroyer	2,020	12 October 1938	sunk 17 January 1941
Simoom	Royal Navy	S	submarine	814	30 December 1942	sunk November 1943
Sims	United States Navy	Sims	destroyer	1,570	1 August 1939	sunk 7 May 1942 during the Battle of the Coral Sea
Sioux	Royal Canadian Navy	V	destroyer	1,710	14 September 1943	paid off 30 October 1963
Sirdar	Royal Navy	S	submarine	814	20 September 1943	scrapped 1965
Sirène	French Navy	Sirène	submarine	599	12 March 1927	Scuttled 27 November 1942
Sitkoh Bay	United States Navy	Casablanca	escort carrier	7,800	28 March 1944	decommissioned 27 July 1954, scrapped 1960
Skagerak	Kriegsmarine		minelayer	1,281	1940	former Norwegian merchant ship Skagerrak I; sunk 20 January 1944 by Bristol Beaufighters of No. 489 Squadron RNZAF
Skeena	Royal Canadian Navy	A	destroyer	1,350	10 June 1931	sunk 25 October 1944
Ślązak	Polish Navy	Hunt	destroyer	1,050	9 May 1942	paid off 28 September 1946.
Slinger	Royal Navy	Ruler	escort carrier	8,333	11 August 1943	paid off 12 April 1946, scrapped 1969/70
Sluys	Royal Navy	Battle	destroyer	2,325	30 September 1946	paid off 1953
Smilax	Royal Navy	Flower modified	corvette	1,015	21 June 1943	paid off 9 October 1945
Smiths Falls	Royal Canadian Navy	Flower modified	corvette	1,015	28 November 1944	8 July 1945
Smiter	Royal Navy	Ruler	escort carrier	7,800	20 January 1944	paid off 6 May 1946, scrapped 1967
Smith	United States Navy	Mahan	destroyer	1,450	19 September 1936	scrapped 1946
Snapper	Royal Navy	S	submarine	670	25 October 1934	sunk February 1941
Snowberry	Royal Canadian Navy	Flower	corvette	925	26 November 1940	paid off 8 June 1945
Snowdrop	Royal Navy	Flower	corvette	925	30 July 1941	sold May 1947; scrapped September 1949
Snowflake	Royal Navy	Flower	corvette	925	2 November 1941	Sold 1947, converted to weather ship; scrapped May 1962
Soemba	Royal Netherlands Navy	Flores	gunboat	1,457	12 April 1926	scrapped June/July 1985
Soerabaja	Royal Netherlands Navy; Imperial Japanese Navy	De Zeven Provinciën	coastal defence ship	6,530	6 October 1910	Sunk 18 February 1942, salvaged in 1942 by Imperial Japanese Navy and used as a battery ship, sunk in 1943 by Allied aircraft
Solebay	Royal Navy	Battle	destroyer	2,325	25 September 1945	paid off April 1962, scrapped 1967
Sollum	Egypt	Anchusa	sloop	1,290	1920	
Solomons	United States Navy	Casablanca	escort carrier	7,800	21 November 1943	decommissioned 15 May 1946, scrapped 1947
Somali	Royal Navy	Tribal	destroyer	2,020	12 December 1938	sunk 24 September 1942
Somali	Free French Naval Forces	Cannon	destroyer	1,240	9 April 1944	Disarmed 1956, used as an experimental vessel
Somers	United States Navy	Somers	destroyer	1,850	1 December 1937	scrapped 1947
Sorel	Royal Canadian Navy	Flower	corvette	925	19 August 1941	paid off 22 June 1945
Sōryū	Imperial Japanese Navy		aircraft carrier	15,900	29 January 1937	sunk 4 June 1942
South Dakota	United States Navy	South Dakota	battleship	35,000	20 March 1942	decommissioned 31 January 1947, scrapped 1962
Southampton	Royal Navy	Southampton	light cruiser	9,100	6 March 1937	bombed and scuttled 11 January 1941
Southdown	Royal Navy	Hunt	destroyer	1,050	8 November 1940	paid off 1946, scrapped 1956
Southwold	Royal Navy	Hunt	destroyer	1,050	9 October 1941	sunk 24 March 1942
Speaker	Royal Navy	Ruler	escort carrier	8,333	20 November 1943	paid off 25 September 1946, scrapped 1972
Spearfish	Royal Navy	S	submarine	670	11 December 1936	sunk 1 August 1940
Spetsai	Hellenic Navy	Kountouriotis	destroyer	1,350	1933	decommissioned 1946
Spikenard	Royal Navy; Royal Canadian Navy	Flower	corvette	925	6 December 1940	to Canada 15 May 1941, sunk on 11 February 1942 by U-136
Spiraea	Royal Navy	Flower	corvette	925	27 February 1941	Sold to Greece as Thessaloniki. August 1945
Spiteful	Royal Navy	S	submarine	814	6 October 1943	scrapped 1963
Splendid	Royal Navy	S	submarine	814	8 August 1942	scuttled 21 April 1943
Sportsman	Royal Navy	S	submarine	814	21 December 1942	to the French Navy on 8 July 1952
Springbank	Royal Navy	Pegasus	fighter catapult ship	5,155	1940	sunk 27 September 1941
Springfield	United States Navy	Cleveland	light cruiser	10,160	9 September 1944	converted to Providence-class guided missile cruiser 1960, decommissioned 1974, scrapped 1980
Springhill	Royal Canadian Navy	River	frigate	1,445	21 March 1944	paid off 1 December 1945
Sri Ayudhya	Royal Thai Navy	Thonburi	coastal defence ship	2,350	19 July 1938	sunk 1 July 1951
St Albans	Royal Navy; Royal Norwegian Navy; Soviet Navy	Town	destroyer	1,190	23 September 1940	to Norway 14 April 1941, to USSR 16 July 1944, scrapped 1949
St. Catharines	Royal Canadian Navy	River	frigate	1,445	31 July 1943	paid off 14 December 1945
St. Clair	Royal Canadian Navy	Town	destroyer	1,190	24 September 1940	paid off 1946
St. Croix	Royal Canadian Navy	Clemson	destroyer	1,190	24 September 1940	sunk 22 September 1943
St. Francis	Royal Canadian Navy	Clemson	destroyer	1,216	24 September 1940	paid off 1945, sank under tow July 1945
St. Kitts	Royal Navy	Battle	destroyer	2,325	21 January 1946	paid off 1957, scrapped February 1962
St. Lambert	Royal Canadian Navy	Flower modified	corvette	1,015	27 May 1944	20 July 1945
St. Laurent	Royal Canadian Navy	C	destroyer	1,375	17 February 1937	paid off 10 October 1945
St. Lo	United States Navy	Casablanca	escort carrier	7,800	23 October 1943	ex-Midway; lost in action 25 October 1944
St. Louis	United States Navy	St. Louis	light cruiser	10,000	19 May 1939	to Brazil as Tamandare 1951, sunk under tow 1980
Saint Paul	United States Navy	Baltimore	heavy cruiser	17,200	17 February 1945	decommissioned 1971, scrapped 1980
St. Pierre	Royal Canadian Navy	River	frigate	1,445	28 August 1944	paid off 22 November 1945
St. Stephen	Royal Canadian Navy	River	frigate	1,445	28 July 1944	paid off 30 January 1946
Stack	United States Navy	Benham	destroyer	1,500	20 November 1939	scuttled after A-bomb test 1948
Stalker	Royal Navy	Attacker	escort carrier	14,400	21 December 1942	paid off 29 December 1945, sold into merchant service as Riouw
Starwort	Royal Navy	Flower	corvette	925	26 May 1941	
Statice	Royal Navy	Flower modified	corvette	1,015	20 September 1943	paid off May 1947
Ste. Therese	Royal Canadian Navy	River	frigate	1,445	28 May 1944	paid off 30 January 1967
Steamer Bay	United States Navy	Casablanca	escort carrier	7,800	4 April 1944	decommissioned January 1947, scrapped 1959
Stellarton	Royal Canadian Navy	Flower modified	corvette	1,015	29 September 1944	1 July 1945
Stembel	United States Navy	Fletcher	destroyer	2,050	16 July 1943	loaned to Argentina as Rosales 1961, scrapped 1982
Sterett	United States Navy	Benham	destroyer	1,500	15 August 1939	scrapped 1947
Sterlet	Royal Navy	S	submarine	670	6 April 1938	sunk 18 April 1940
Stettler	Royal Canadian Navy	River	frigate	1,445	7 May 1944	paid off 31 August 1966
Stevenson	United States Navy	Gleaves	destroyer	1,630	15 December 1942	decommissioned 1946, scrapped 1970
Stevenstone	Royal Navy	Hunt	destroyer	1,050	18 March 1943	Scrapped in 1959
Stewart	United States Navy; Imperial Japanese Navy	Clemson	destroyer	1,200	15 September 1920	scuttled 2 March 1942, raised by IJN and recommissioned September 1943
Stier	Kriegsmarine		auxiliary cruiser	11,000	25 November 1939	sunk 27 September 1942
Stockton	United States Navy	Gleaves	destroyer	1,630	11 January 1943	decommissioned 1946, scrapped 1973
Stone Town	Royal Canadian Navy	River	frigate	1,445	21 July 1944	paid off 13 November 1945
Stonecrop	Royal Navy	Flower	corvette	925	30 July 1941	sold into merchant service May 1947
Stord	Royal Norwegian Navy	S	destroyer	2,400	29 September 1943	scrapped 1959
Strathadam	Royal Canadian Navy	River	frigate	1,445	29 September 1944	paid off 7 November 1945
Strathroy	Royal Canadian Navy	Flower modified	corvette	1,015	20 November 1944	12 July 1945
Strasbourg	French Navy	Dunkerque	battleship	26,500	February 1939	scuttled 27 November 1942
Stockton	United States Navy	Gleaves	destroyer	1,630	11 January 1943	decommissioned 1946, scrapped 1973
Stord	Royal Norwegian Navy	S	destroyer	2,400	29 September 1943	scrapped 1959
Stormont	Royal Canadian Navy	River	frigate	1,445	27 November 1943	paid off 9 November 1945
Striker	Royal Navy	Attacker	escort carrier	10,000	29 April 1943	paid off 12 February 1946, scrapped 1948
Strule	Royal Navy; Free French Naval Forces	River	frigate	1,370		to Free French 25 September 1944 as Croix de Lorraine; decommissioned 1961
Sudbury	Royal Canadian Navy	Flower	corvette	925	15 October 1941	paid off 28 August 1945
Suffren	French Navy; Free French Naval Forces	Suffren	heavy cruiser	9,940	1 January 1930	scrapped 1974
The Sullivans	United States Navy	Fletcher	destroyer	2,050	4 April 1943	museum ship
Sumatra	Royal Netherlands Navy	Java	light cruiser	6,670	26 May 1926	scuttled off the coast of Normandy on 9 June 1944 at Ouistreham as part of a "gooseberry" pier to protect an artificial Allied Mulberry harbour built as part of Operation Overlord.
Summerside	Royal Canadian Navy	Flower	corvette	925	11 September 1941	paid off 6 July 1945
Sundew	Royal Navy	Flower	corvette	925	19 September 1941	to Free French as Roselys; scrapped 1948
Sunfish	Royal Navy	S	submarine	670	2 July 1937	sunk 27 July 1944
Sunflower	Royal Navy	Flower	corvette	925	25 January 1941	Scrapped September 1947
Sussexvale	Royal Canadian Navy	River	frigate	1,445	29 November 1944	paid off 30 November 1966
Sutlej	Royal Indian Navy	Black Swan	Sloop	1,250	23 April 1941	to Indian Navy as INS Sutlej 1947; converted to survey ship 1955; decommissioned 1978; scrapped 1979
Suwannee	United States Navy	Sangamon	escort carrier	24,275	24 September 1942	decommissioned 8 January 1947; scrapped 1960
Suzuya	Imperial Japanese Navy	Mogami	heavy cruiser	15,900	October 1937	sunk 25 October 1944 during the Battle off Samar
Svenner	Royal Norwegian Navy	S	destroyer	1,710	11 March 1944	sunk 6 June 1944
Sverige	Swedish Navy	Sverige	coastal defence ship	6,852	14 May 1917	paid off 30 January 1953, scrapped 1958
Swale	Royal Navy; South African Navy	Loch	frigate	1,370		to South Africa 29 July 1945; scrapped February 1955
Swansea	Royal Canadian Navy	River	frigate	1,445	4 October 1943	paid off 14 October 1966
Swanson	United States Navy	Gleaves	destroyer	1,630	29 May 1941	decommissioned 1945, scrapped 1972
Sweetbriar	Royal Navy	Flower	corvette	925	8 September 1941	Sold July 1946; whale catcher Star IX June 1949; scrapped April 1966
Swift	Royal Navy	S	destroyer	1,710	12 December 1943	sunk by mine 24 June 1944
Sydney	Royal Australian Navy	modified Leander	light cruiser	6,980	24 September 1935	lost 19 November 1941
