= HMS Scotsman (P243) =

Submarine of the Royal Navy

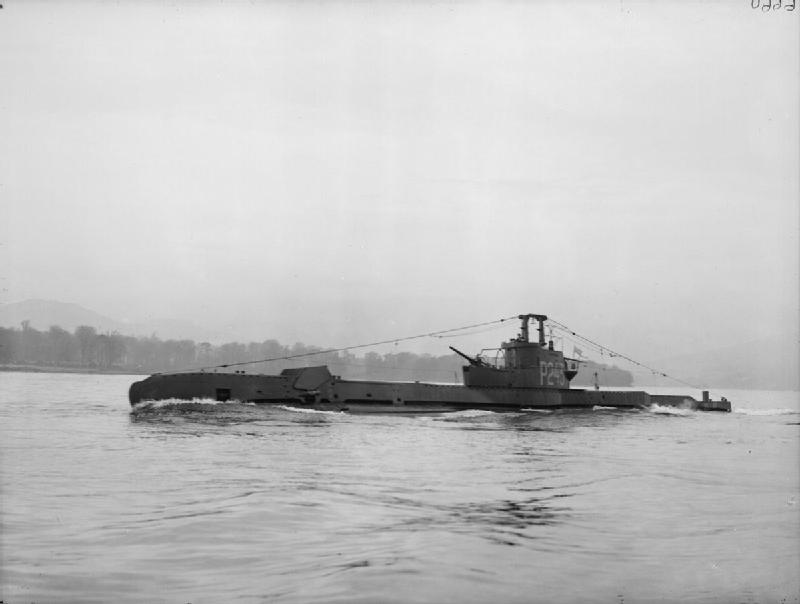
- Scotsman

History

United Kingdom
- Name: Scotsman
- Ordered: 20 December 1941
- Builder: Scotts, Greenock
- Laid down: 15 April 1943
- Launched: 18 August 1944
- Commissioned: 9 December 1944
- Fate: expended in trials 1964; salved and broken up, November 1964
- Badge

General characteristics
- Class & type: S-class submarine
- Displacement: 814 long tons (827 t) surfaced; 990 long tons (1,010 t) submerged
- Length: 217 ft (66.1 m)
- Beam: 23 ft 9 in (7.2 m)
- Draught: 14 ft 8 in (4.5 m)
- Installed power: 1,900 bhp (1,400 kW) (diesel); 1,300 hp (970 kW) (electric)
- Propulsion: 2 × diesel engines; 2 × electric motors
- Speed: 15 kn (28 km/h; 17 mph) surfaced; 10 kn (19 km/h; 12 mph) submerged
- Range: 7,500 nmi (13,900 km; 8,600 mi) at 10 knots (19 km/h; 12 mph) surface; 120 nmi (220 km; 140 mi) at 3 knots (5.6 km/h; 3.5 mph) submerged
- Test depth: 350 feet (106.7 m)
- Complement: 48
- Armament: 6 × bow 21 in (533 mm) torpedo tubes; 1 × 4-inch (102 mm) deck gun; 1 × 20 mm (0.8 in) Oerlikon AA gun

HMS Scotsman was a third-batch S-class submarine of the third batch built for the Royal Navy during World War II. After training exercises in Britain during which she ran aground, requiring repairs, she was transferred to the Pacific fleet as the war with Germany had ended. The submarine sank one junk en route to her submarine unit, but arrived after the end of the Pacific War and World War II. After the war, Scotsman served for some time was an experimental trials submarine, in the course of which she was extensively modified. She was scrapped in November 1964.

== Design and description ==
The third batch was slightly enlarged and improved over the preceding second batch of the S-class. The submarines had a length of 217 feet (66.1 m) overall, a beam of 23 feet 9 inches (7.2 m) and a draught of 14 feet 8 inches (4.5 m). They displaced 814 long tons (827 t) on the surface and 990 long tons (1,010 t) submerged. The S-class submarines had a crew of 48 officers and ratings. Scotsman had thicker hull plating which increased her diving depth to 350 feet (106.7 m).

For surface running, the boats were powered by two 950-brake-horsepower (708 kW) diesel engines, each driving one propeller shaft. When submerged each propeller was driven by a 650-horsepower (485 kW) electric motor. They could reach 15 knots (28 km/h; 17 mph) on the surface and 10 knots (19 km/h; 12 mph) underwater. Scotsman could carry more fuel than most of the third batch boats and had a range of 7,500 nautical miles (13,900 km; 8,600 mi) on the surface at 10 knots (19 km/h; 12 mph) and 120 nmi (220 km; 140 mi) at 3 knots (5.6 km/h; 3.5 mph) submerged.

Scotsman was armed with six 21 inch (533 mm) torpedo tubes in the bow. She carried six reload torpedoes for a total of a dozen torpedoes. Twelve mines could be carried in lieu of the torpedoes. The boat was also equipped with a 4-inch (102 mm) deck gun and a 20-millimetre (0.8 in) Oerlikon light AA gun.

== Construction and career ==
HMS Scotsman was a third-batch S-class submarine, ordered by the British Admiralty on 20 December 1941, during World War II. She was laid down in the Scotts Shipbuilding and Engineering Company shipyard in Greenock on 15 April 1943 and was launched on 18 August 1944. On 9 December 1944, Scotsman, under the command of Lieutenant Alan H. B. Anderson, was commissioned into the Royal Navy.

After anti-submarine and gunnery exercises off the River Clyde and Scapa Flow, Scotsman departed for Holy Loch on 24 March 1945, for additional training. During additional training on 7 April, the boat ran aground, forcing her to dock for repairs in Greenock until 28 May.

With the war in Europe ended, on 11 June 1945 Scotsman departed Holy Loch to redeploy to the Pacific theater of operations, where war was still being fought against he Japanese Empire. Along with her sister ship HMS Spur and HMS Turpin, she made the passage from Britain to Gibraltar, then to Malta. She continued on with Spur through Port Said, Aden, and Trincomalee to her unit based at Subic Bay, Philippines. Shortly before arriving, she sank a junk with gunfire west of the Island of Borneo. With the Surrender of Japan and the end of the war in the Pacific, the boat returned to Britain at Rothesay on 7 December 1945, after a stop in Hong Kong.

In April 1947 she was taken in hand at Chatham Dockyard for reconstruction as a high-speed trials submarine. As completed the following year, her ballast tanks had been moved from the sides of the pressure-hull to its underside, all torpedo tubes removed, the conning tower cut down and streamlined, the existing diesels and electric motors taken out and replaced by a single Paxman diesel-generator set as fitted in U-class submarines and electric motors of the kind fitted in A-class submarines; two additional sets of batteries were also installed, doubling electrical storage. The new machinery gave a maximum of 3600shp and up to 17 knots submerged speed. Various further modifications to the conning tower and casing were made from 1950, with a large streamlined sail installed in 1952, and a new rounded bow in 1960.

As rebuilt, Scotsman underwent a long series of trials, as well as taking part in the Fleet Review to celebrate the Coronation of Queen Elizabeth II in 1953. Her last duty was to be deeply submerged to test the crush-strength of her hull, in Kames Bay in 1964. Sunk as a result, the hulk was raised by the Admiralty lifting craft LC10 and LC11, arriving at Troon on 19 November 1964 to be broken up by the West of Scotland Shipbreaking Company.
