= P239 =

P239 may refer to:

- HMS Peacock (P239), now known as BRP Emilio Jacinto (PS-35), a corvette formerly of the Royal Navy which now serves in the Philippine Navy
- HMS Surf (P239), a submarine of the Royal Navy that served during World War II
- The SIG Sauer P239, a compact semi-automatic pistol
- An isotope of Plutonium. Used in nuclear weapons.
