= HMS Starfish (19S) =

Submarine

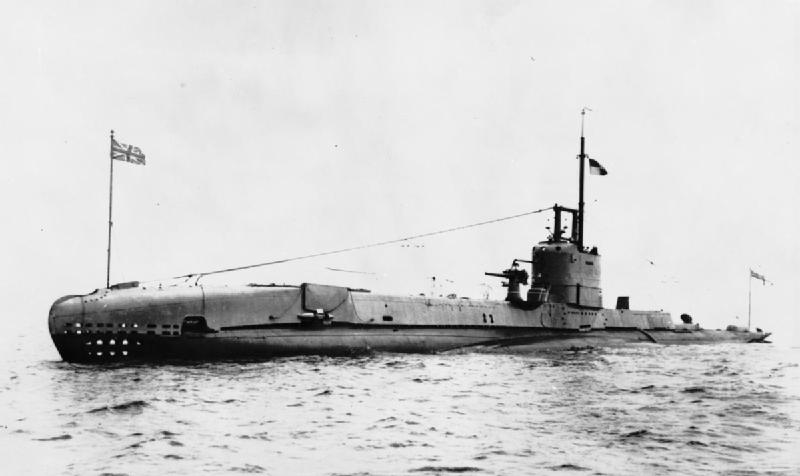
- Starfish on the surface

History

United Kingdom
- Name: Starfish
- Ordered: 16 March 1931
- Builder: Chatham Dockyard
- Laid down: 29 September 1931
- Launched: 14 March 1933
- Commissioned: 27 October 1933
- Fate: Sunk, 9 January 1940
- Badge

General characteristics
- Class & type: S-class submarine
- Displacement: 730 long tons (740 t) surfaced; 927 long tons (942 t) submerged
- Length: 202 ft 6 in (61.7 m)
- Beam: 24 ft (7.3 m)
- Draught: 11 ft 11 in (3.6 m)
- Installed power: 1,550 bhp (1,160 kW) (diesel); 1,300 hp (970 kW) (electric)
- Propulsion: 2 × diesel engines; 2 × electric motors
- Speed: 13.75 knots (25.47 km/h; 15.82 mph) surfaced; 10 knots (19 km/h; 12 mph) submerged
- Range: 3,700 nmi (6,900 km; 4,300 mi) at 10 knots (19 km/h; 12 mph) surface; 64 nmi (119 km; 74 mi) at 2 knots (3.7 km/h; 2.3 mph) submerged
- Test depth: 300 feet (91.4 m)
- Complement: 38
- Armament: 6 × bow 21 in (533 mm) torpedo tubes; 1 × 3-inch (76 mm) deck gun

HMS Starfish was a first-batch S-class submarine (often called the Swordfish class) built for the Royal Navy during the 1930s. Completed in 1933, she participated in the Second World War.

During the war, Starfish, part of the 2nd Submarine Flotilla, conducted five uneventful war patrols in the North Sea. On 9 January 1940, during her sixth patrol, she attacked a German minesweeper off Heligoland Bight, but after the attack failed and her diving planes jammed, Starfish was repeatedly attacked with depth charges. Badly damaged, she was forced to surface, and sank after all her crew were rescued by German ships.

== Design and description ==
The S-class submarines were designed as successors to the L class and were intended to operate in the North and Baltic Seas. The submarines had a length of 202 feet 6 inches (61.7 m) overall, a beam of 24 feet (7.3 m) and a mean draught of 11 feet 11 inches (3.6 m). They displaced 730 long tons (740 t) on the surface and 927 long tons (942 t) submerged. The S-class submarines had a crew of 38 officers and ratings. They had a diving depth of 300 feet (91.4 m).

For surface running, the boats were powered by two 775-brake-horsepower (578 kW) diesel engines, each driving one propeller shaft. When submerged each propeller was driven by a 650-horsepower (485 kW) electric motor. They could reach 13.75 knots (25.47 km/h; 15.82 mph) on the surface and 10 knots (19 km/h; 12 mph) underwater. On the surface, the first-batch boats had a range of 3,700 nautical miles (6,900 km; 4,300 mi) at 10 knots (19 km/h; 12 mph) and 64 nmi (119 km; 74 mi) at 2 knots (3.7 km/h; 2.3 mph) submerged.

The boats were armed with six 21 inch (533 mm) torpedo tubes in the bow. They carried six reload torpedoes for a grand total of a dozen torpedoes. They were also armed with a 3-inch (76 mm) deck gun.

== Construction and career ==
Ordered on 16 March 1931, HMS Starfish was laid down at Chatham Royal Dockyard on 29 September 1931 and was launched on 14 March 1933. She was commissioned later that year, on 27 October 1933.

At the onset of World War II, Starfish was a member of the 2nd Submarine Flotilla. From 23–26 August 1939, the 2nd Submarine Flotilla deployed to the war bases at Dundee and Blyth.

On 24 August 1939, Starfish, under the command of Lt. Thomas Anthony Turner, departed her homeport for its first patrol, southwest of Stavanger, Norway. On the First of September, a rating on board Starfish suffered a severe injury to the head, and her commander decided to return to port. When Britain declared war with Nazi Germany on 3 September, this became her first war patrol although she arrived at Dundee later that day. On the eleventh, she left port for her second combat patrol, in the same area as the first. After an uneventful patrol, Starfish returned to Dundee on 21 September.

Starfish departed port on 4 October for her third war patrol, to the northwest of Bergen, Norway. On 17 October, she finished her uneventful third patrol at Rosyth. On 28 October Starfish left Rosyth for a patrol in the North Sea, off Dogger Bank. Again her patrol was uneventful, and Starfish returned to Blyth on 7 November. She left again for her fifth patrol, southwest of Norway, then later to the west of Denmark. On 8 December, Starfish ended her patrol, which had been uneventful, at Blyth.

On 6 January 1940, Starfish departed for her sixth and last combat patrol, off Heligoland Bight. On 9 January at 10:40 (UTC), she sighted the German minesweeper M-7 and attacked it in position 55°00′N 07°10′E. However, the attack failed because, due to drill errors, the torpedoes were not fired. Starfish commenced a second attack but her diving planes jammed, and her commander decided to submerge to the 27 metres (88.6 ft) deep bottom to conduct repairs. According to Captain Turner in his postwar report, Starfish was located by the German minesweeper, who dropped two depth charges which caused no damage. At 10:50, a crew member asked for permission to restart one of the motors to prevent the gyro from wandering. Permission was granted, but no sooner the motor had been started, four depth charges were dropped directly above the boat, causing widespread damage. At 14:40, another attack was carried out, and twenty depth charges exploded close to the submarine's hull, damaging rivets and causing leaking. By 18:00 Starfish was severely flooded, and her commander, seeing the Germans would not leave, gave the order to surface at 18:20. She was forced to drop her ballast keel, coming up at a 45° angle due to flooding. All crew were rescued and taken as prisoners of war, and Starfish sank shortly after.

Commander of M-7 was Oberleutnant zur See Heinrich Timm, future submarine ace. For the sinking of HMS Starfish he received Iron Cross 2nd class and was promoted to Kapitänleutnant.

In July 1940, a diving mission was sent to locate her wreck and secret documents, but the attempt was unsuccessful.
