= HMS Salmon (N65) =

Submarine

Coordinates: 57°00′N 2°47′E

- Salmon on the surface

History

United Kingdom
- Name: Salmon
- Builder: Cammell Laird, Birkenhead
- Laid down: 15 June 1933
- Launched: 30 April 1934
- Commissioned: 8 March 1935
- Fate: Sunk on 9 July 1940
- Badge

General characteristics
- Class & type: S-class submarine
- Displacement: 768 long tons (780 t) surfaced; 960 long tons (980 t) submerged
- Length: 208 ft 8 in (63.6 m)
- Beam: 24 ft 0 in (7.3 m)
- Draught: 11 ft 10 in (3.6 m)
- Installed power: 1,550 bhp (1,160 kW) (diesel); 1,300 hp (970 kW) (electric)
- Propulsion: 2 × diesel engines; 2 × electric motors
- Speed: 13.75 knots (25.47 km/h; 15.82 mph) surfaced; 10 knots (19 km/h; 12 mph) submerged
- Range: 6,000 nmi (11,000 km; 6,900 mi) at 10 knots (19 km/h; 12 mph) surface; 64 nmi (119 km; 74 mi) at 2 knots (3.7 km/h; 2.3 mph) submerged
- Test depth: 300 feet (91.4 m)
- Complement: 40
- Armament: 6 × bow 21 in (533 mm) torpedo tubes; 1 × 3-inch (76 mm) deck gun

HMS Salmon was a second-batch S-class submarine built during the 1930s for the Royal Navy. Completed in 1935, the boat fought in the Second World War. Salmon is one of twelve boats named in the song "Twelve Little S-Boats".

On 4 December 1939, Salmon became the first boat to sink a U-boat during the Second World War when it torpedoed and sank the German U-36 in the North Sea south-west of Kristiansand, Norway.

== Design and description ==
The second batch of S-class submarines were designed as slightly improved and enlarged versions of the earlier boats of the class and were intended to operate in the North and Baltic Seas. The submarines had a length of 208 feet 8 inches (63.6 m) overall, a beam of 24 feet 0 inches (7.3 m) and a mean draught of 11 feet 10 inches (3.6 m). They displaced 768 long tons (780 t) on the surface and 960 long tons (980 t) submerged. The S-class submarines had a crew of 40 officers and ratings. They had a diving depth of 300 feet (91.4 m).

For surface running, the boats were powered by two 775-brake-horsepower (578 kW) diesel engines, each driving one propeller shaft. When submerged each propeller was driven by a 650-horsepower (485 kW) electric motor. They could reach 13.75 knots (25.47 km/h; 15.82 mph) on the surface and 10 knots (19 km/h; 12 mph) underwater. On the surface, the second-batch boats had a range of 6,000 nautical miles (11,000 km; 6,900 mi) at 10 knots (19 km/h; 12 mph) and 64 nmi (119 km; 74 mi) at 2 knots (3.7 km/h; 2.3 mph) submerged.

The S-class boats were armed with six 21-inch (533 mm) torpedo tubes in the bow. They carried six reload torpedoes for a total of a dozen torpedoes. They were also armed with a 3-inch (76 mm) deck gun.

== Construction and career ==
Ordered on 20 January 1933, Salmon was laid down on 15 June 1933 in Cammell Laird's shipyard in Birkenhead and was launched on 30 April 1934. The boat was completed on 8 March 1935 and received the pennant number 98S.

On 4 December 1939, while on patrol in the North Sea, Salmon torpedoed and sank U-36.

On 12 December 1939, Salmon sighted the German liner SS Bremen. While challenging Bremen, an escorting Dornier Do 18 seaplane forced Salmon to dive. After diving, Salmon's commander, Lieutenant Commander E. O. Bickford, decided not to torpedo the liner because he believed she was not a legal target. Bickford's decision not to fire on Bremen likely delayed the start of unrestricted submarine warfare in the war.

On 13 December 1939, Salmon sighted a fleet of German warships. She fired a spread of torpedoes which damaged two German cruisers (one was German cruiser Leipzig, the other, her younger sister ship, German cruiser Nürnberg). Salmon evaded the fleet's destroyers, which hunted her for two hours.

She was lost, probably sunk by a mine, on 9 July 1940.

There is a report from 2008 that the same survey ship that found the wreck of the sister submarine HMS Shark also found the wreck of HMS Salmon nearby in waters off Norway.
