= German training ship Brummer =

Nazi warship (1936–1940)

Coordinates: 58°55′N 9°56′E

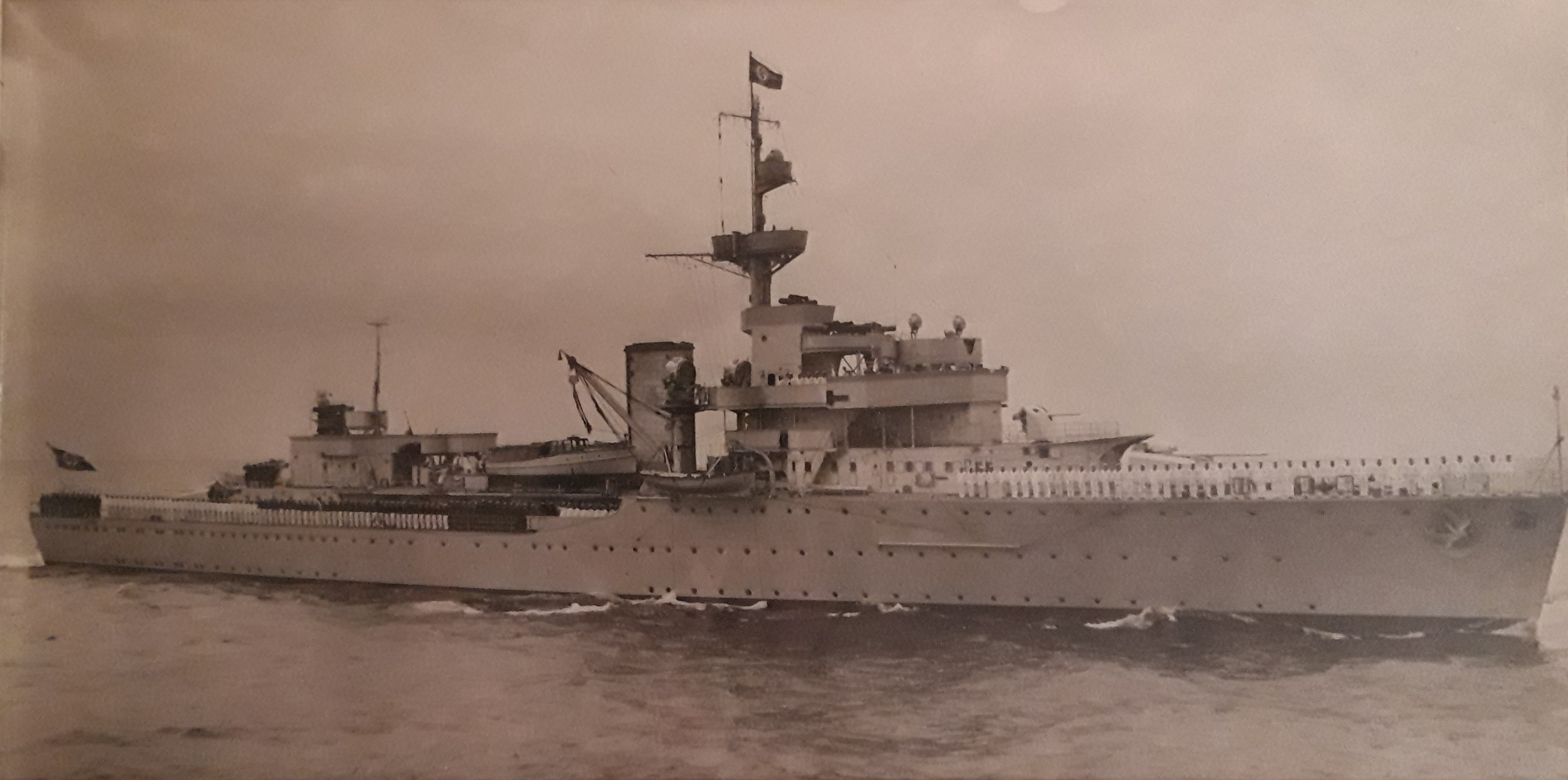

History

Nazi Germany
- Name: Brummer
- Builder: DeSchiMAG, Bremen
- Laid down: 27 December 1934
- Launched: 29 May 1935
- Commissioned: 8 February 1936
- Fate: Sunk on 15 April 1940

General characteristics
- Type: Training ship / minelayer
- Displacement: 3,010 tonnes (2,960 long tons; 3,320 short tons)
- Length: 112.9 m (370 ft 5 in)
- Beam: 13.5 m (44 ft 3 in)
- Draft: 4.27 m (14 ft 0 in)
- Propulsion: geared turbines (Wagner), two shafts, 4 boilers, 10,150 shp (7.57 MW)
- Speed: 23.1 knots (42.8 km/h; 26.6 mph)
- Range: 2,400 nmi (4,400 km; 2,800 mi)
- Complement: 226 (varying)
- Armament: 8 × 10.5 cm (4.1 in) SK C/33 Flak; 2 × 8.8 cm (3.5 in) SK C/35 Flak; 8 × 3.7 cm (1.5 in) SK C/30 Flak; 4 × 2 cm (0.79 in) C/30 Flak; 480 × EMC mines
- Armor: 30mm belt, 25mm deck

Brummer was a training ship of Nazi Germany's Kriegsmarine during World War II designed in the mid 1930s primarily for anti-aircraft gunnery training, she was also fitted for minelaying, her intended duty in wartime. Brummer was also used to test high pressure steam turbine systems designed for the German destroyers.

She took part in the invasion of Poland, laying mines off the Polish coast. In January 1940 she was used as a commerce raider in the Baltic Sea and later took part in the invasion of Norway; as a command ship of a transport squadron. On 14 April she was torpedoed by the British submarine HMS Sterlet off Jutland, losing the complete bow section.

== Design ==
In the mid-1930s two artillery training ships were built to drill the gunnery personal of the Kriegsmarine. Although Brummer was primarily designed for anti-aircraft gunnery training, she was also fitted for minelaying, her intended primary duty during wartime. Brummer was also used as an experimental ship for the high-pressure steam turbine systems designed for the German destroyers. The propulsion system of Brummer showed no major design flaws, and the destroyers were fitted with an almost identical system. This design later proved to be unreliable when used in the destroyers.

== Early history ==
After being commissioned in 1936 Brummer worked up in the Baltic Sea and was then attached to the Naval Air Defense and Artillery School (German: Marineflugabwehr- und Küstenartillerieschule) in Swinemünde in early 1937. Between 1937 and 1938 Brummer made two visits to Odda, Gothenburg, and Helsingborg.

== Wartime career ==
In September 1939, Brummer took part in the invasion of Poland, laying mines off the Polish coast. In January 1940 she was used as a commerce raider in the Baltic Sea.

In April 1940, Brummer took part in Operation Weserübung, the invasion of Norway; as a command ship of a transport squadron. On April 14 she was torpedoed by the British submarine HMS Sterlet in the Skagerak, losing the complete bow section. The ship was towed towards land and held afloat for nine hours, finally capsizing in the early morning of the next day near the Tveistein lighthouse outside of Larvik. Today the wreck rests at 85-120 meters of water. The wreck was visited in 2000 for the first time by Danish diver Kim Hermansen and Norwegian diver Bjarte Vestøl.
