= HMS Spirit =

Submarine of the Royal Navy

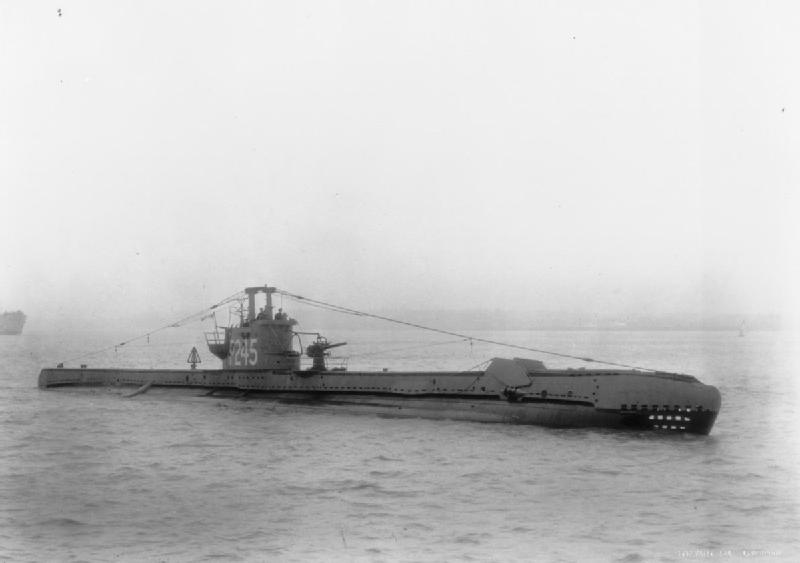
- HMS Spirit

History

United Kingdom
- Name: HMS Spirit
- Builder: Cammell Laird & Co Limited, Birkenhead
- Laid down: 27 October 1942
- Launched: 20 July 1943
- Commissioned: 25 October 1943
- Fate: broken up 1950
- Badge

General characteristics
- Class & type: S-class submarine
- Displacement: 842 long tons (856 t) surfaced; 990 long tons (1,010 t) submerged
- Length: 217 ft (66.1 m)
- Beam: 23 ft 9 in (7.2 m)
- Draught: 14 ft 8 in (4.5 m)
- Installed power: 1,900 bhp (1,400 kW) (diesel); 1,300 hp (970 kW) (electric)
- Propulsion: 2 × diesel engines; 2 × electric motors
- Speed: 15 knots (28 km/h; 17 mph) surfaced; 10 knots (19 km/h; 12 mph) submerged
- Range: 6,000 nmi (11,000 km; 6,900 mi) at 10 knots (19 km/h; 12 mph) surface; 120 nmi (220 km; 140 mi) at 3 knots (5.6 km/h; 3.5 mph) submerged
- Test depth: 300 feet (91.4 m)
- Complement: 48
- Armament: 7 × 21 in (533 mm) torpedo tubes (6 bow, 1 stern); 1 × 3-inch (76 mm) deck gun

HMS Spirit was a S-class submarine of the third batch built for the Royal Navy during World War II. She survived the war and was scrapped in 1950.

== Design and description ==
The third batch was slightly enlarged and improved over the preceding second batch of the S-class. The submarines had a length of 217 feet (66.1 m) overall, a beam of 23 feet 9 inches (7.2 m) and a draught of 14 feet 8 inches (4.5 m). They displaced 842 long tons (856 t) on the surface and 990 long tons (1,010 t) submerged. The S-class submarines had a crew of 48 officers and ratings. They had a diving depth of 300 feet (91.4 m).

For surface running, the boats were powered by two 950-brake-horsepower (708 kW) diesel engines, each driving one propeller shaft. When submerged each propeller was driven by a 650-horsepower (485 kW) electric motor. They could reach 15 knots (28 km/h; 17 mph) on the surface and 10 knots (19 km/h; 12 mph) underwater. On the surface, the third batch boats had a range of 6,000 nautical miles (11,000 km; 6,900 mi) at 10 knots (19 km/h; 12 mph) and 120 nmi (220 km; 140 mi) at 3 knots (5.6 km/h; 3.5 mph) submerged.

The boats were armed with seven 21 inch (533 mm) torpedo tubes. A half-dozen of these were in the bow and there was one external tube in the stern. They carried six reload torpedoes for the bow tubes for a grand total of thirteen torpedoes. Twelve mines could be carried in lieu of the internally stowed torpedoes. They were also armed with a 3-inch (76 mm) deck gun.

== Construction and career ==
HMS Spirit was built by Cammell Laird and launched on 20 July 1943, the only Royal Navy vessel to bear the name as of 2026. She survived the Second World War, spending most of it with the Eastern Fleet, where she sank four Siamese sailing vessels, the Japanese ship Ryushin Maru, the Japanese coaster Ryuho Maru, and an unidentified enemy vessel. Spirit also claimed to have damaged a small Japanese oiler with gunfire to the north of Sumatra. Spirit was eventually paid off, arriving at Thos. W. Ward, of Grays on 4 July 1950 for breaking up.
