= HMS Spur =

Submarine of the Royal Navy

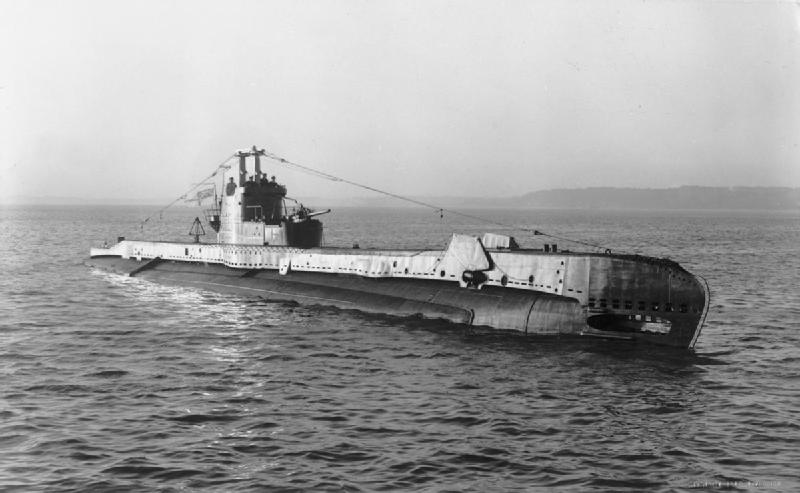
- HMS Spur

History

United Kingdom
- Name: HMS Spur
- Builder: Cammell Laird & Co Limited, Birkenhead
- Laid down: 1 October 1943
- Launched: 17 November 1944
- Commissioned: 18 February 1945
- Fate: Sold to the Portuguese navy as NRP Narval, November 1948
- Badge

Portugal
- Name: NRP Narval
- Acquired: November 1948
- Fate: Broken up 1 October 1969

General characteristics
- Class & type: S-class submarine
- Displacement: 814 long tons (827 t) surfaced; 990 long tons (1,010 t) submerged
- Length: 217 ft (66.1 m)
- Beam: 23 ft 9 in (7.2 m)
- Draught: 14 ft 1 in (4.3 m)
- Installed power: 1,900 bhp (1,400 kW) (diesel); 1,300 hp (970 kW) (electric)
- Propulsion: 2 × diesel engines; 2 × electric motors
- Speed: 14.75 knots (27.32 km/h; 16.97 mph) surfaced; 9 knots (17 km/h; 10 mph) submerged
- Range: 7,500 nmi (13,900 km; 8,600 mi) at 10 knots (19 km/h; 12 mph) surface; 120 nmi (220 km; 140 mi) at 3 knots (5.6 km/h; 3.5 mph) submerged
- Test depth: 350 feet (106.7 m)
- Complement: 48
- Armament: 6 × bow 21 in (533 mm) torpedo tubes; 1 × 4-inch (102 mm) deck gun

HMS Spur was a S-class submarine of the third batch built for the Royal Navy during World War II. She survived the war and was sold to Portugal in 1948 and was renamed NRP Narval.

== Design and description ==
The last 17 boats of the third batch were significantly modified from the earlier boats. They had a stronger hull, carried more fuel and their armament was revised. The submarines had a length of 217 feet (66.1 m) overall, a beam of 23 feet 9 inches (7.2 m) and a draught of 14 feet 1 inch (4.3 m). They displaced 814 long tons (827 t) on the surface and 990 long tons (1,010 t) submerged. The S-class submarines had a crew of 48 officers and ratings. They had a diving depth of 350 feet (106.7 m).

For surface running, the boats were powered by two 950-brake-horsepower (708 kW) diesel engines, each driving one propeller shaft. When submerged each propeller was driven by a 650-horsepower (485 kW) electric motor. They could reach 14.75 knots (27.32 km/h; 16.97 mph) on the surface and 9 knots (17 km/h; 10 mph) underwater. On the surface, the third batch boats had a range of 7,500 nautical miles (13,900 km; 8,600 mi) at 10 knots (19 km/h; 12 mph) and 120 nmi (220 km; 140 mi) at 3 knots (5.6 km/h; 3.5 mph) submerged.

Spur was armed with six 21 inch (533 mm) torpedo tubes in the bow. She carried six reload torpedoes for a grand total of a dozen torpedoes. Twelve mines could be carried in lieu of the torpedoes. The boat was also equipped with a 4-inch (102 mm) deck gun.

== Construction and career ==
HMS Spur was built by Cammell Laird and launched on 17 November 1944. So far she has been the only ship of the Royal Navy to bear the name Spur. During her wartime career, Spur claimed to have sunk a total of eleven junks in the Strait of Malacca, during her service in the Far East. The boat survived the Second World War and was sold to the Portuguese navy in November 1948, where she was renamed NRP Narval. She was broken up on 1 October 1969.
