= HMS Snapper (39S) =

Submarine

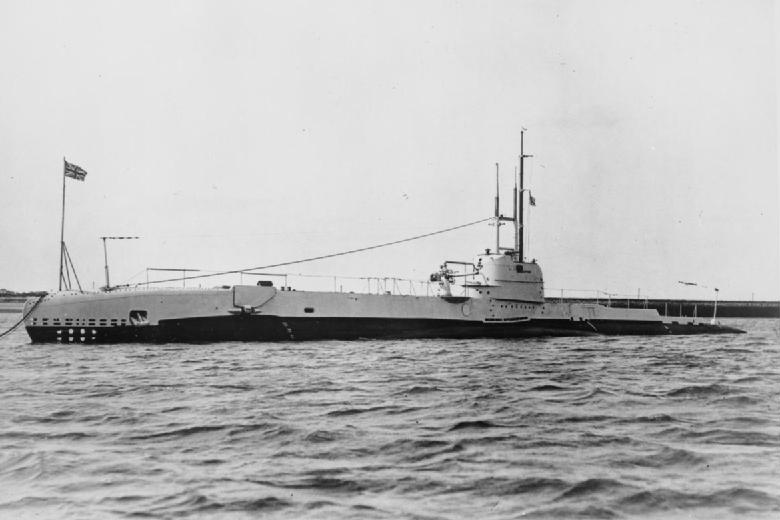

History

United Kingdom
- Name: Snapper
- Ordered: 13 June 1933
- Builder: Chatham Dockyard
- Laid down: 18 September 1933
- Launched: 25 October 1934
- Completed: 14 June 1935
- Fate: Missing after 29 January 1941
- Badge

General characteristics
- Class & type: S-class submarine
- Displacement: 768 long tons (780 t) surfaced; 960 long tons (980 t) submerged
- Length: 208 ft 8 in (63.6 m)
- Beam: 24 ft (7.3 m)
- Draught: 11 ft 10 in (3.6 m)
- Installed power: 1,550 bhp (1,160 kW) (diesel); 1,300 hp (970 kW) (electric)
- Propulsion: 2 × diesel engines; 2 × electric motors
- Speed: 13.75 knots (25.47 km/h; 15.82 mph) surfaced; 10 knots (19 km/h; 12 mph) submerged
- Range: 6,000 nmi (11,000 km; 6,900 mi) at 10 knots (19 km/h; 12 mph) surface; 64 nmi (119 km; 74 mi) at 2 knots (3.7 km/h; 2.3 mph) submerged
- Test depth: 300 feet (91.4 m)
- Complement: 40
- Armament: 6 × bow 21 in (533 mm) torpedo tubes; 1 × 3-inch (76 mm) deck gun

HMS Snapper was a second-batch S-class submarine built during the 1930s for the Royal Navy. Completed in 1935, the boat participated in the Second World War. Snapper is one of the 12 boats named in the song "Twelve Little S-Boats".

== Design and description ==
The second batch of S-class submarines were designed as slightly improved and enlarged versions of the earlier boats of the class and were intended to operate in the North and Baltic Seas. The submarines had a length of 208 feet 8 inches (63.6 m) overall, a beam of 24 feet (7.3 m) and a mean draught of 11 feet 10 inches (3.6 m). They displaced 768 long tons (780 t) on the surface and 960 long tons (980 t) submerged. The S-class submarines had a crew of 40 officers and ratings. They had a diving depth of 300 feet (91.4 m).

For surface running, the boats were powered by two 775-brake-horsepower (578 kW) diesel engines, each driving one propeller shaft. When submerged each propeller was driven by a 650-horsepower (485 kW) electric motor. They could reach 13.75 knots (25.47 km/h; 15.82 mph) on the surface and 10 knots (19 km/h; 12 mph) underwater. On the surface, the second-batch boats had a range of 6,000 nautical miles (11,000 km; 6,900 mi) at 10 knots (19 km/h; 12 mph) and 64 nmi (119 km; 74 mi) at 2 knots (3.7 km/h; 2.3 mph) submerged.

The S-class boats were armed with six 21-inch (533 mm) torpedo tubes in the bow. They carried six reload torpedoes for a total of a dozen torpedoes. They were also armed with a 3-inch (76 mm) deck gun.

== Construction and career ==
Ordered on 16 June 1933, Snapper was laid down on 18 September 1933 at HM Dockyard, Chatham and was launched on 25 October 1934. The boat was completed on 14 June 1935.

Snapper spent most of her career in home waters. She was mistakenly attacked by a British aircraft when returning to Harwich after a patrol in the North Sea. Although suffering a direct hit, Snapper escaped damage. She went on to sink the small German oil tanker Moonsund, the German merchant Florida, the German auxiliary minesweepers M 1701 / H. M. Behrens and M 1702 / Carsten Janssen, the German armed trawler V 1107 / Portland and the Norwegian merchant Cygnus. She also attacked the German armed merchant cruiser Widder, but the torpedoes missed their target.

== Sinking ==
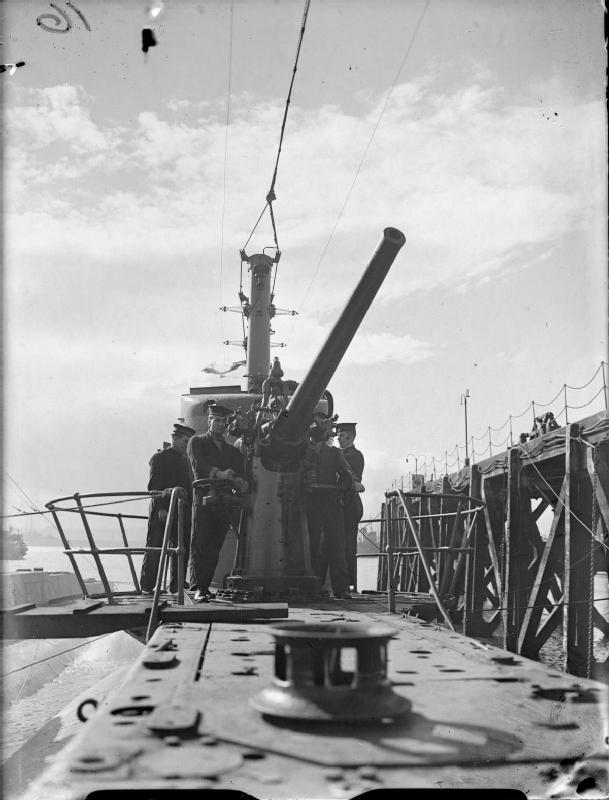
The gun crew close up at their three-inch gun on board Snapper as she sits alongside a quayside

She left the Clyde on 29 January 1941 to patrol in the Bay of Biscay. She should have arrived in her patrol area on 1 February. She was ordered to remain on station until 10 February and then to return with her escort. Snapper failed to make the rendezvous with the escort and was not heard from again. It is believed that she met her fate through a mine or that she was mortally damaged by a minesweeper which attacked a submarine in Snapper's area on 11 February, although Snapper should have been out of the area by then. Other sources report that the S-class submarine was depth charged and sunk in the Bay of Biscay south west of Ouessant, Finistère, France (47°25′N 5°47′W) by the German minesweepers M-2, M-13 and M-25 with the loss of all 41 crew.
