= HMS Sibyl (P217) =

Submarine of the Royal Navy

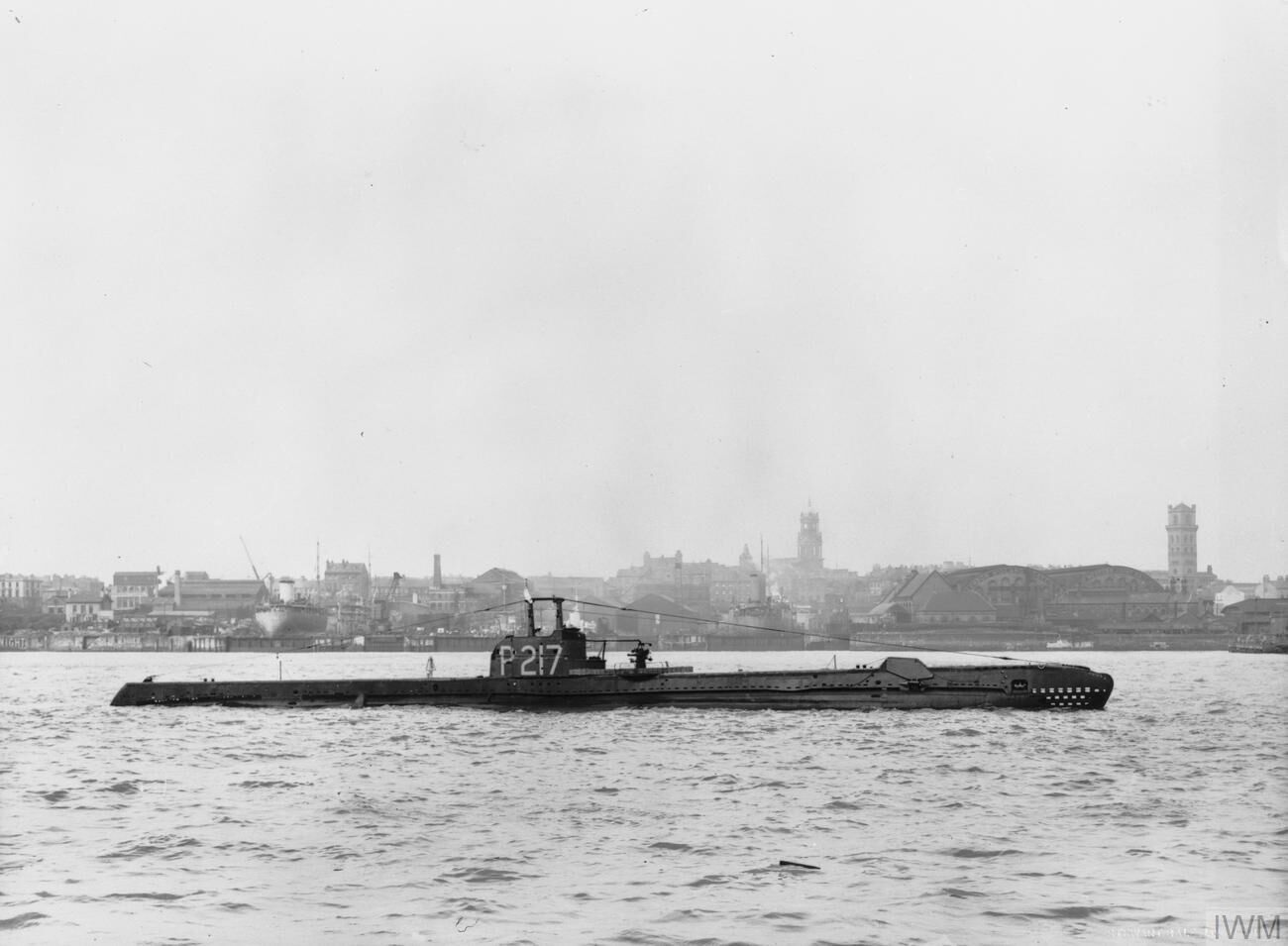
- Sibyl

History

United Kingdom
- Name: Sibyl
- Ordered: 4 April 1940
- Builder: Cammell Laird, Birkenhead
- Laid down: 31 December 1940
- Launched: 29 April 1942
- Commissioned: 16 August 1942
- Fate: Broken up, 1948
- Badge

General characteristics
- Class & type: S-class submarine
- Displacement: 865 long tons (879 t) (surfaced); 990 long tons (1,010 t) (submerged)
- Length: 217 ft (66.1 m)
- Beam: 23 ft 9 in (7.2 m)
- Draught: 14 ft 8 in (4.5 m)
- Installed power: 1,900 bhp (1,400 kW) (diesel); 1,300 hp (970 kW) (electric)
- Propulsion: 2 × diesel engines; 2 × electric motors
- Speed: 15 kn (28 km/h; 17 mph) (surfaced); 10 kn (19 km/h; 12 mph) (submerged)
- Range: 6,000 nmi (11,000 km; 6,900 mi) at 10 knots (19 km/h; 12 mph) (surfaced); 120 nmi (220 km; 140 mi) at 3 knots (5.6 km/h; 3.5 mph) (submerged)
- Test depth: 300 ft (91.4 m)
- Complement: 48
- Sensors & processing systems: Type 129AR or 138 ASDIC; Type 291 early-warning radar
- Armament: 7 × 21 in (533 mm) torpedo tubes (6 × bow, 1 × stern); 1 × 3 in (76 mm) deck gun; 1 × 20 mm (0.8 in) AA gun

HMS Sibyl was an S-class submarine built for the Royal Navy during the Second World War, and part of the Third Group built of that class. She was built by Cammell Laird and launched on 29 April 1942.

== Design and description ==
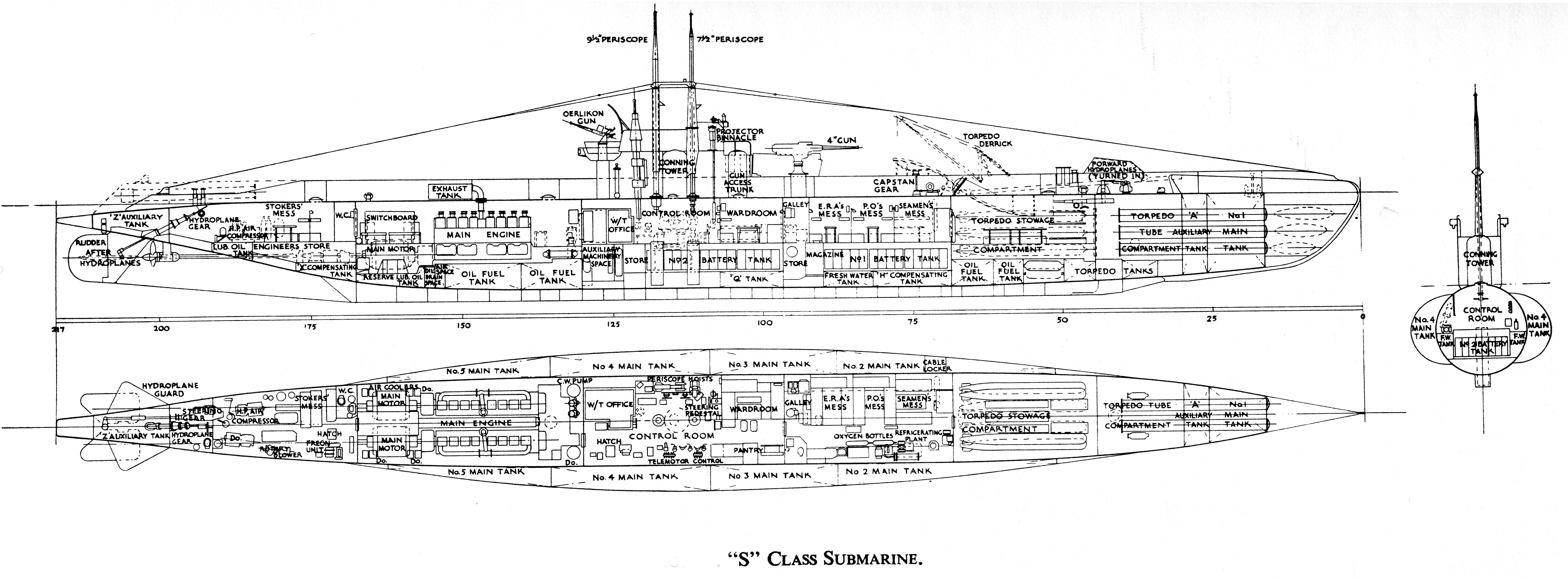
Schematic drawing of a S-class submarine

The S-class submarines were designed to patrol the restricted waters of the North Sea and the Mediterranean Sea. The third batch was slightly enlarged and improved over the preceding second batch of the S-class. The submarines had a length of 217 feet (66.1 m) overall, a beam of 23 feet 9 inches (7.2 m) and a draught of 14 feet 8 inches (4.5 m). They displaced 865 long tons (879 t) on the surface and 990 long tons (1,010 t) submerged. The S-class submarines had a crew of 48 officers and ratings. They had a diving depth of 300 feet (91.4 m).

For surface running, the boats were powered by two 950-brake-horsepower (708 kW) diesel engines, each driving one propeller shaft. When submerged each propeller was driven by a 650-horsepower (485 kW) electric motor. They could reach 15 knots (28 km/h; 17 mph) on the surface and 10 knots (19 km/h; 12 mph) underwater. On the surface, the third-batch boats had a range of 6,000 nautical miles (11,000 km; 6,900 mi) at 10 knots (19 km/h; 12 mph) and 120 nmi (220 km; 140 mi) at 3 knots (5.6 km/h; 3.5 mph) submerged.

The boats were armed with seven 21 inch (533 mm) torpedo tubes. A half-dozen of these were in the bow and there was one external tube in the stern. They carried six reload torpedoes for the bow tubes for a total of thirteen torpedoes. Twelve mines could be carried in lieu of the internally stowed torpedoes. They were also armed with a 3-inch (76 mm) deck gun. It is uncertain if Sibyl was completed with a 20-millimetre (0.8 in) Oerlikon light AA gun or had one added later. The third-batch S-class boats were fitted with either a Type 129AR or 138 ASDIC system and a Type 291 or 291W early-warning radar.

== Construction and career ==
=== Mediterranean ===
Sibyl had a distinguished career, sinking numerous enemy ships, including the Italian merchant Pegli, the French (in German service) merchant St. Nazaire, the German auxiliary minesweeper M 7022/Hummer, five Greek sailing vessels and an unknown sailing vessel. She also unsuccessfully attacked the Italian merchant Fabriano, the German tanker Centaur and what is identified as 'a merchant of about 1500 tons' in a German convoy. Her commanding officer between June 1942 and 3 July 1944 was Lt. Ernest John Donaldson Turner, who was awarded the Distinguished Service Order on 23 June 1943. Turner was succeeded as commander by Lt. Huston (Tex) Roe Murray, who commanded her for the rest of the war. His First Lieutenant was Stephen Jenner, who later became the commander of the Canadian Submarine fleet.

=== Far East ===
On being transferred to operate in the Pacific in early 1945, Sibyl continued to cause losses to enemy shipping. The first Far East patrol was spent around the Andaman Islands and south of Singapore in the Malacca Strait. She sank a number of Japanese vessels with gunfire and scuttling charges in the Malacca Straits, and was strafed by aircraft and depth charged three times after these successful attacks.

Sibyl was the first British submarine to surface in Singapore harbour after the Japanese surrendered. She operated out of Trincomalee, Ceylon from the depot ship HMS Forth.

After the atom bombs were dropped on Japan, Louis Mountbatten, Supreme Commander in the Far East wanted the surrender signed in Singapore and called for the fleet to be there. HMS Sibyl had been in the harbour the longest so her men were invited to the ceremony, which was held aboard HMS Sussex. The mainly British and Australian prisoners of war held in Changi jail by the Japanese were released and taken on board the British ships and fed corned beef sandwiches and hot tea, as they were in terrible condition. It was noted that the entire harbour smelt of freshly baked bread for several days as the numerous ship's galleys were put to the task of feeding the starving prisoners of war.

== Post war ==
Sibyl survived the Second World War, and was sold off, arriving at Troon in March 1948 for breaking up.
