= Kames Bay, Loch Melfort =

Bay in Argyll and Bute, Scotland

Kames Bay
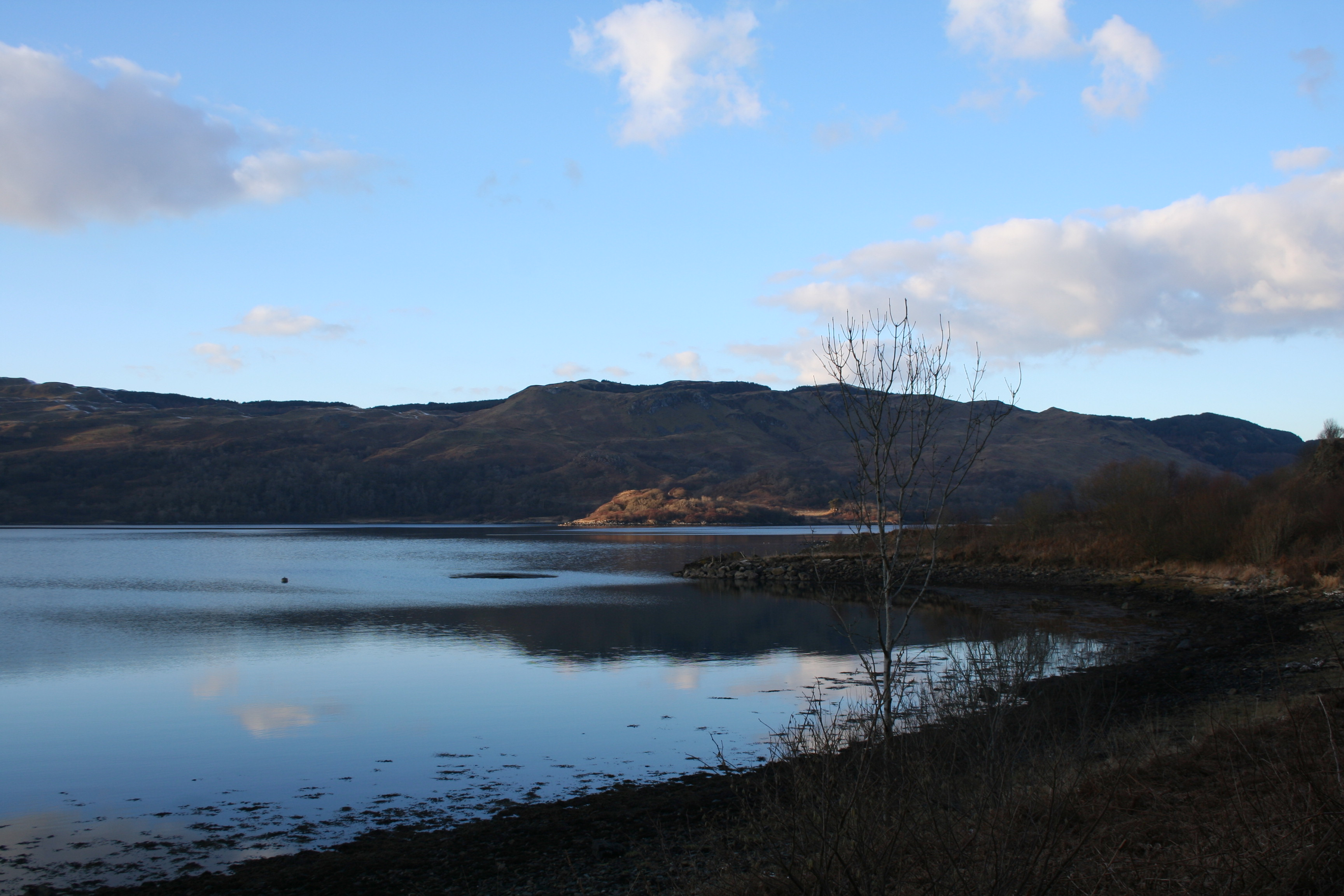
- Kames Bay, Loch Melfort. The north east view of Kames Bay and Loch Melfort beyond.

- Location within Argyll and Bute
- Location: Argyll and Bute, Scotland
- Coordinates: 56°14′55.345″N 5°30′57.701″W
- Ocean/sea sources: Loch Melfort
- Basin countries: Scotland
- Max. length: 0.658 km (0.409 mi)
- Max. width: 0.346 km (0.215 mi)

Kames Bay is small remote tidal north by northwest facing coastal embayment forming part of the southern coast of Loch Melfort within Argyll and Bute, Scotland.

== Settlements ==
The main A816 road from Oban to Lochgilphead passes the bay. To the south west is the small village of Arduaine situated close to the Arduaine Point and Asknish Bay. To the north east is the small settlement of Kilmelford.

Kames Bay hosts a fish farm.

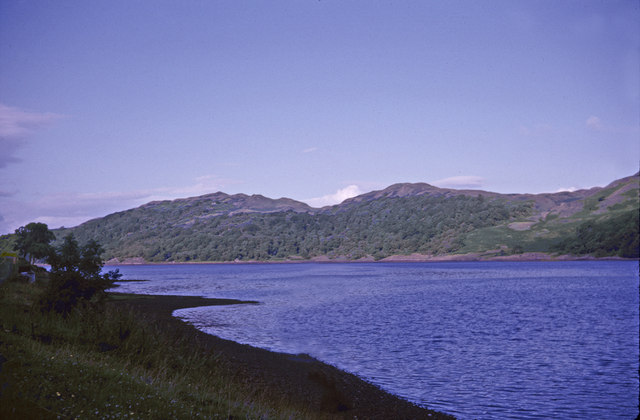
Shoreline, Kames Bay, Loch Melfort, Argyll & Bute Looking across the Loch towards An Coire and Dun Crutagain

== Geography ==
To the east, the bay is bounded by Rubh án Àird Fhada point. To the west is the small tidal sea loch Loch na Cille, which provide a sheltered haven for yachts. On the other side of Loch Melfort from the bay, is the small rocky island of Eilean Coltair to the north west. Further to the west is the larger Kilchoan Bay which contains the island. Directly opposite is the Bàgh na Dalach Dubh-Chlachaich point and east at the head of Loch Melfort is the Fearnach Bay
