= British S-class submarine (1931) =

Type of British submarines in service before and during WWII

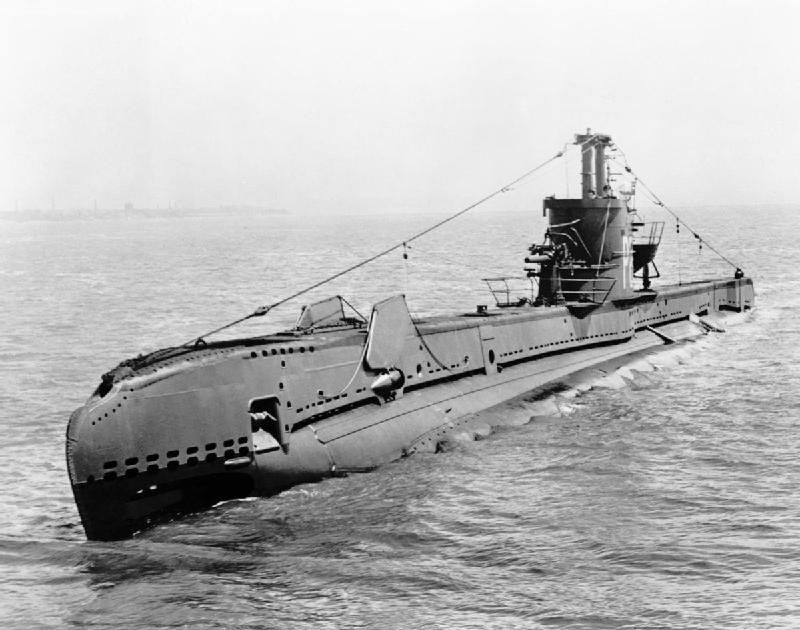
- HMS Stonehenge

Class overview
- Name: S class
- Preceded by: Rainbow class
- Succeeded by: River class
- Completed: 62

General characteristics
- Type: Submarine

The S-class submarines of the Royal Navy were originally designed and built during the modernisation of the submarine force in the early 1930s to meet the need for smaller boats to patrol the restricted waters of the North Sea and the Mediterranean Sea, replacing the British H-class submarines. As part of the major naval construction for the Royal Navy during the Second World War, the S class became the single largest group of submarines ever built for the Royal Navy. A total of 62 were constructed over a period of 15 years, with fifty of the "improved" S class being launched between 1940 and 1945.

At the start of the Second World War the S class was together with the British U and T class, Dutch O 21 class and German Type VII one of the most advanced submarine classes in service at the time.

== Service ==
The submarines operated in the waters around the United Kingdom and in the Mediterranean, and later in the Far East after being fitted with extra tankage.

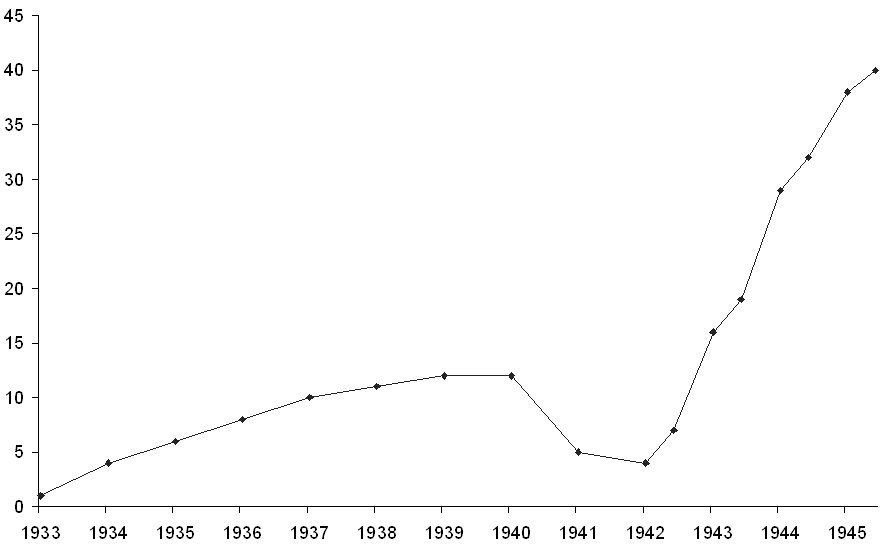
Number of S-class submarines in service by year.

After the war S-class boats continued to serve in the Royal Navy until the 1960s. The last operational boat in the Royal Navy was Sea Devil, launched in 1945 and scrapped in February 1966. Springer was in Israeli service as INS Tanin and was decommissioned in 1972.

Several S-class submarines were sold on or lent to other navies:

- Netherlands 1
- Portugal 3
- France 4
- Israel 2. (HMS Springer as INS Tanin (S71), landed commandos and fought with an Egyptian ship in the Six-Day War)

A modified version was ordered by the Turkish navy in 1939 as the Oruç Reis class.

== Service losses ==
Of the twelve S-class boats that were in service in 1939, only three survived to see the end of World War II, a loss rate that inspired the song "Twelve Little S-Boats", based on a nursery rhyme originally written by Septimus Winner in 1868:

Twelve little S-boats "go to it" like Bevin,

Starfish goes a bit too far — then there were eleven.

Eleven watchful S-boats doing fine and then

Seahorse fails to answer — so there are ten.

Ten stocky S-boats in a ragged line,

Sterlet drops and stops out — leaving us nine.

Nine plucky S-boats, all pursuing Fate,

Shark is overtaken — now we are eight.

Eight sturdy S-boats, men from Hants and Devon,

Salmon now is overdue — and so the number's seven.

Seven gallant S-boats, trying all their tricks,

Spearfish tries a newer one — down we come to six.

Six tireless S-boats fighting to survive,

No reply from Swordfish — so we tally five.

Five scrubby S-boats, patrolling close inshore,

Snapper takes a short cut — now we are four.

Four fearless S-boats, too far out to sea,

Sunfish bombed and scrap-heaped — we are only three.

Three threadbare S-boats patrolling o'er the blue,

...

Two ice-bound S-boats...

...

One lonely S-boat...

...

The survivors, left blank in the fatalistic rhyme, were HMS Sealion (scuttled), HMS Seawolf (broken up), and HMS Sturgeon (sold).

== General characteristics ==
=== First group ===
Class overview
- Name: First group
- Completed: 4

General characteristics
- Type: Submarine
- Displacement: 640 tons surfaced; 935 tons submerged
- Length: 202 ft 6 in (61.72 m)
- Beam: 24 ft (7.3 m)
- Draught: 10 ft 6 in (3.20 m)
- Speed: 13.75 knots (25.47 km/h; 15.82 mph) surfaced; 10 knots (19 km/h) submerged
- Complement: 36 officers and enlisted
- Armament: 6× 21-inch (533 mm) torpedo tubes (bow, 12 Mark VIII torpedoes); 1× 3-inch (76 mm) gun; 1× .303-calibre machine gun

Silhouette of S-class submarine, group I

The first group of S-class submarines consisted of four boats. They were smaller and slower than later classes, and carried less armament, but could be crewed by fewer men. All four were built at Chatham Dockyard, between 1930 and 1932. During the war, they operated in home waters, particularly the English Channel, and off the Scandinavian coast. The later second and third groups of S-class submarines would have their fuel capacity expanded to allow them to operate further and overcome this limitation.

The mortality rate of these early boats was particularly high. Only one, HMS Sturgeon, survived to the end of the war.

Boats:

Two ordered under the 1929 Construction Programme:

- HMS Swordfish
- HMS Sturgeon

Two ordered under the 1930 Construction Programme:

- HMS Seahorse
- HMS Starfish

Class overview
- Name: Second group
- Completed: 8

General characteristics
- Type: Submarine
- Displacement: 670 tons surfaced; 960 tons submerged
- Length: 208 ft 9 in (63.63 m)
- Beam: 24 ft (7.3 m)
- Draught: 10 ft 6 in (3.20 m)
- Speed: 13.75 knots (25.47 km/h; 15.82 mph) surfaced; 10 knots (19 km/h) submerged
- Complement: 39 officers and enlisted
- Armament: 6× 21-inch (533 mm) torpedo tubes (bow, 12 Mark VIII torpedoes); 1× 3-inch (76 mm) gun; 1× .303-calibre machine gun

=== Second group ===
Silhouette of S-class submarine, group II

The second group of S-class submarines consisted of eight boats. They were larger than the preceding first group and required more men to crew but carried a similar armament. Construction was divided between Chatham Dockyard, and the yards of Scotts, of Greenock and Cammell Laird & Co Limited, of Birkenhead. All the boats were built between 1934 and 1937. During the war, they, like the submarines of the first group, mostly operated in home waters, ranging as far afield as the Bay of Biscay and the Scandinavian coast. One, HMS Sunfish, was assigned to the Soviet Navy (named V-1) and was sunk by friendly aircraft on the transfer route from Dundee to Murmansk. Group Two boats had their fuel capacity increased to a maximum of 72 long tons (73 t) which increased range to 6,000 nautical miles (11,000 km; 6,900 mi) at 10 knots (19 km/h; 12 mph).

A large percentage of these submarines were also lost during the war. Only two, HMS Sealion and HMS Seawolf, survived to the end of the war.

Boats:

Two ordered under the 1931 Construction Programme:

- HMS Sealion
- HMS Shark

Two ordered under the 1932 Construction Programme:

- HMS Snapper
- HMS Salmon

One ordered under the 1933 Construction Programme:

- HMS Seawolf

Two ordered under the 1934 Construction Programme:

- HMS Spearfish
- HMS Sunfish

One ordered under the 1935 Construction Programme:

- HMS Sterlet

=== Third group ===
Class overview
- Name: Third group
- Completed: 50 (excluding cancelled boats)

General characteristics
- Type: Submarine
- Displacement: 814–842 tons surfaced; 990 tons submerged
- Length: 217 ft (66 m)
- Beam: 23 ft 6 in (7.16 m)
- Draught: 11 ft (3.4 m)
- Speed: 14.75 knots (27.32 km/h; 16.97 mph) surfaced; 8 knots (15 km/h) submerged
- Complement: 49 officers and enlisted
- Armament: 7× 21-inch (533 mm) torpedo tubes (6 forward, 1 aft; 13 Mark VIII torpedoes); 1 × 3-inch (76 mm) gun (QF 4-inch gun on later boats); 1 × 20 mm cannon; 3 × .303-calibre machine gun

Silhouette of S-class submarine, group III

The third and by far the most numerous group of S-class submarines consisted of 50 boats. They were the largest and most heavily armed of the S class and required more men to crew. They were one knot faster on the surface, but two knots slower when submerged. Most of the group were built at the yards of either Scotts, of Greenock or Cammell Laird & Co Limited, of Birkenhead, with a handful being built at Chatham, or by Vickers Armstrongs Ltd, of Barrow-in-Furness. Construction was carried out throughout the war, particularly between 1941 and 1945. Equipped with a greater fuel capacity, of up to 98 long tons, than their predecessors, they operated much further afield, in the Mediterranean and in the Pacific.

There were two distinct subgroups. The first were boats of 842 tons, comprising those ordered under the 1939 War Emergency, 1940 and 1941 Programmes (except Sea Devil and Scotsman), plus Sturdy and Stygian of the 1942 Programme; these carried an external stern torpedo tube in addition to the six bow tubes. The second subgroup were boats of 814 tons, comprising Sea Devil and Scotsman of the 1941 Programme, plus those ordered under the 1942 and 1943 Programmes (except Sturdy and Stygian); these carried no external torpedo tube, but had a thicker welded pressure hull providing for an operational depth limit of 350 feet (110 m) - compared with the 300 feet (91 m) limit in the first subgroup.

Losses continued to be high. Nine boats; P222, Saracen, Sahib, Sickle, Simoom, Splendid, Stonehenge, Stratagem and Syrtis were lost during the war, and Shakespeare and Strongbow were so badly damaged that they were written off and scrapped. Many surviving boats remained in service after the war. Sportsman, by now transferred to the French Navy, was lost off Toulon in 1952 and Sidon was sunk after a torpedo malfunction in 1955.

Boats:

Five ships were ordered under the 1939 War Emergency Programme.

- HMS Safari
- HMS Sahib
- HMS Saracen
- HMS Satyr
- HMS Sceptre

Twenty boats were ordered under the 1940 Programme. These differed from the initial five by having an external stern torpedo tube fitted, also a 20 mm Oerlikon AA gun and air warning RDF installed.

- HMS Seadog
- HMS Sibyl
- HMS Sea Rover
- HMS Seraph
- HMS Shakespeare
- HMS P222 which was lost before a name could be allotted to her.
- HMS Sea Nymph
- HMS Sickle
- HMS Simoom
- HMS Sirdar
- HMS Spiteful
- HMS Splendid
- HMS Sportsman
- The final seven further boats (P81 to P87) ordered under the 1940 Programme, all from Vickers-Armstrongs, were cancelled during 1943 (and were never laid down or named).

Fifteen boats were ordered under the 1941 Programme.

- HMS Stoic
- HMS Stonehenge
- HMS Storm
- HMS Stratagem
- HMS Strongbow
- HMS Spark
- HMS Scythian
- HMS Stubborn
- HMS Surf
- HMS Syrtis
- HMS Shalimar
- HMS Scotsman
- HMS Sea Devil
- HMS Spirit
- HMS Statesman

Thirteen boats were ordered under the 1942 Programme.

- HMS Sturdy
- HMS Stygian
- HMS Subtle
- HMS Supreme
- HMS Sea Scout
- HMS Selene
- HMS Seneschal
- HMS Sentinel
- HMS Sidon
- HMS Sleuth
- HMS Solent
- HMS Spearhead
- HMS Springer – sold to Israel, recommissioned August 1959 as INS Tanin, participated in the Six-Day War

Eight boats were ordered under the 1943 Programme, but only four were completed. The other four submarines was cancelled after the war ended in 1945, and they became surplus to peacetime requirements.

- HMS Saga
- HMS Scorcher
- HMS Spur
- HMS Sanguine – sold to Israel, recommissioned August 1959 as INS Rahav
- HMS Sea Robin (P267) – cancelled
- HMS Sprightly (P268) – cancelled
- HMS Surface (P269) – cancelled
- HMS Surge (P271) – cancelled

== Boats in foreign service ==
Several S-class submarines were sold on or lent to other navies.
From the First group:

- In 1943 HMS Sturgeon was transferred to the Royal Netherlands Navy as Zeehond. She was returned in 1945

From the Second group

- In 1944 HMS Sunfish was transferred to the Soviet Navy (and renamed V-1); she was sunk in a friendly fire incident while on transfer to Murmansk.

From the Third group

- In 1948 three submarines were transferred to Portugal
  - HMS Spearhead became Neptuno
  - HMS Saga became Nautilo
  - HMS Spur became Narval
- In 1952 four submarines were transferred to France and were known as the Saphir class
  - HMS Satyr became Saphir
  - HMS Spiteful became Sirene
  - HMS Sportsman became Sibylle but was lost in a diving accident in September 1952
  - HMS Statesman became Sultane
- In 1959 two submarines were sold to Israel
  - HMS Springer became INS Tanin and saw action during the Six Day War
  - HMS Sanguine became INS Rahav

== See also ==
- List of submarines of France

== Sources ==
- Colledge, J. J.; Warlow, Ben (2006) [1969]. Ships of the Royal Navy: The Complete Record of All Fighting Ships of the Royal Navy from the 15th Century to the Present (3rd Rev ed.). London: Chatham Publishing. ISBN 978-1-86176-281-8. OCLC 67375475.
- Bagnasco, Erminio (1977). Submarines of World War Two. Annapolis: Naval Institute Press. ISBN 0870219626.
- Gardiner, Robert; Chumbley, Stephen (1995). Conway's All The World's Fighting Ships 1947–1995. Annapolis: Naval Institute Press. ISBN 1-55750-132-7.
- van den Pol, E. (1989). "Aspects of submarines - Part I: Some notes on development". Schip en Werf. Vol. 56, no. 10. Rotterdam: Wyt & Zonen. pp. 352–358. ISSN 0036-6099.
