= HMS Sterlet =

Submarine of the Royal Navy

Coordinates: 58°40′N 9°56′E

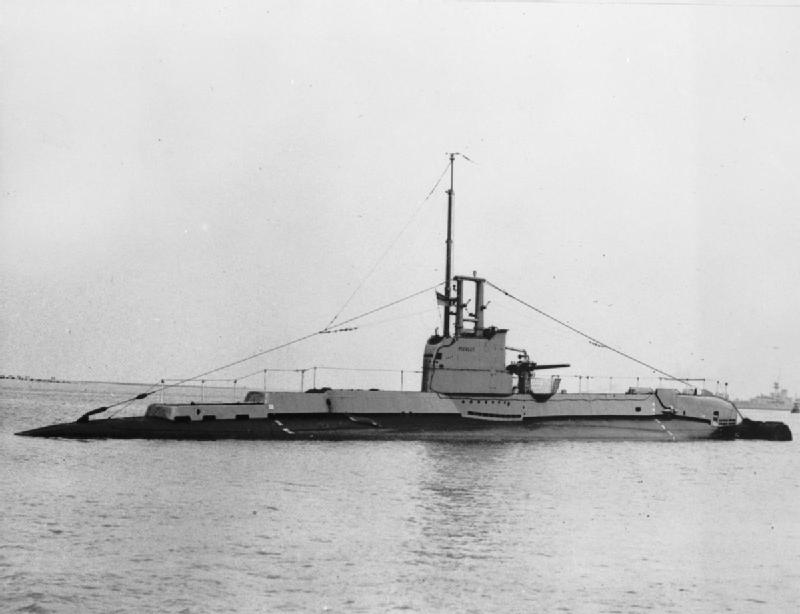
- Sterlet

History

United Kingdom
- Name: Sterlet
- Namesake: Sterlet
- Ordered: 2 March 1936
- Builder: Chatham Dockyard
- Laid down: 14 July 1936
- Launched: 22 September 1937
- Commissioned: 6 April 1938
- Identification: Pennant number 2S
- Fate: Sunk, 18 April 1940
- Badge

General characteristics
- Class & type: S-class submarine
- Displacement: 768 long tons (780 t) surfaced; 960 long tons (980 t) submerged
- Length: 208 ft 8 in (63.6 m)
- Beam: 24 ft (7.3 m)
- Draught: 11 ft 10 in (3.6 m)
- Installed power: 1,550 bhp (1,160 kW) (diesel); 1,300 hp (970 kW) (electric)
- Propulsion: 2 × Diesel engines; 2 × Electric motors
- Speed: 13.75 knots (25.47 km/h; 15.82 mph) surfaced; 10 knots (19 km/h; 12 mph) submerged
- Range: 6,000 nmi (11,000 km; 6,900 mi) at 10 knots (19 km/h; 12 mph) surface; 64 nmi (119 km; 74 mi) at 2 knots (3.7 km/h; 2.3 mph) submerged
- Test depth: 300 feet (91.4 m)
- Complement: 40
- Armament: 6 × bow 21 in (533 mm) torpedo tubes; 1 × 3-inch (76 mm) deck gun

HMS Sterlet was a second-batch S-class submarine built during the 1930s for the Royal Navy. Completed in 1938, the boat fought in the Second World War. The submarine is one of the 12 boats named in the song Twelve Little S-Boats. Thus far she has been the only ship of the Royal Navy to be named Sterlet.

== Design and description ==
The second batch of S-class submarines were designed as slightly improved and enlarged versions of the earlier boats of the class and were intended to operate in the North and Baltic Seas. The submarines had a length of 208 feet 8 inches (63.6 m) overall, a beam of 24 feet (7.3 m) and a mean draught of 11 feet 10 inches (3.6 m). They displaced 768 long tons (780 t) on the surface and 960 long tons (980 t) submerged. The S-class submarines had a crew of 40 officers and ratings. They had a diving depth of 300 feet (91.4 m).

For surface running, the boats were powered by two 775-brake-horsepower (578 kW) diesel engines, each driving one propeller shaft. When submerged each propeller was driven by a 650-horsepower (485 kW) electric motor. They could reach 13.75 knots (25.47 km/h; 15.82 mph) on the surface and 10 knots (19 km/h; 12 mph) underwater. On the surface, the second-batch boats had a range of 6,000 nautical miles (11,000 km; 6,900 mi) at 10 knots (19 km/h; 12 mph) and 64 nmi (119 km; 74 mi) at 2 knots (3.7 km/h; 2.3 mph) submerged.

The S-class boats were armed with six 21-inch (533 mm) torpedo tubes in the bow. They carried six reload torpedoes for a total of a dozen torpedoes. They were also armed with a 3-inch (76 mm) deck gun.

== Construction and career ==
Ordered on 2 March 1936, Sterlet was laid down on 14 July 1936 in HM Dockyard, Chatham and was launched on 22 September 1936. The boat was completed on 6 April 1938.

At the onset of the Second World War, Sterlet was a member of the 2nd Submarine Flotilla. From 23–26 August 1939 the 2nd Submarine Flotilla transferred to its war bases at Dundee and Blyth.

On 8 April 1940 Sterlet left for a patrol in the Skagerrak, off Norway under the command of Lt. Gerard Henry Stacpoole Haward. Four days later she unsuccessfully attacked a convoy of three merchant ships and a destroyer. The following day she was assigned a new patrol area and on 14 April torpedoed the German gunnery training ship Brummer, leading to her sinking the following day.

She was possibly sunk by the German anti-submarine trawlers UJ-125, UJ-126 and UJ-128 on 18 April. Alternatively, she may have struck a mine whilst returning to port.
