= HMS Surf =

Submarine of the Royal Navy

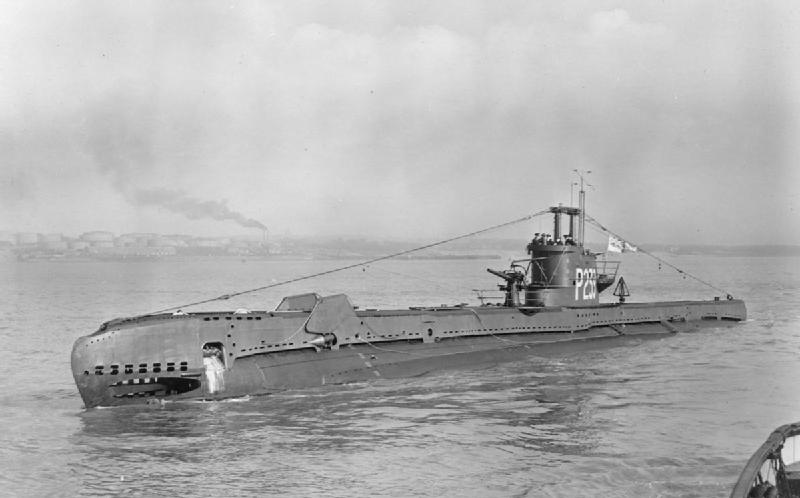
- HMS Surf

History

United Kingdom
- Name: HMS Surf
- Builder: Cammell Laird, Birkenhead
- Launched: 10 December 1942
- Commissioned: 18 March 1943
- Fate: Sold 28 October 1949
- Badge

General characteristics
- Class & type: S-class submarine
- Displacement: 842 long tons (856 t) surfaced; 990 long tons (1,010 t) submerged
- Length: 217 ft (66.1 m)
- Beam: 23 ft 9 in (7.2 m)
- Draught: 14 ft 8 in (4.5 m)
- Installed power: 1,900 bhp (1,400 kW) (diesel); 1,300 hp (970 kW) (electric)
- Propulsion: 2 × diesel engines; 2 × electric motors
- Speed: 15 knots (28 km/h; 17 mph) surfaced; 10 knots (19 km/h; 12 mph) submerged
- Range: 6,000 nmi (11,000 km; 6,900 mi) at 10 knots (19 km/h; 12 mph) surface; 120 nmi (220 km; 140 mi) at 3 knots (5.6 km/h; 3.5 mph) submerged
- Test depth: 300 feet (91.4 m)
- Complement: 48
- Armament: 7 × 21 in (533 mm) torpedo tubes (6 bow, 1 stern); 1 × 3 in (76 mm) deck gun

HMS Surf was a S-class submarine of the third batch built for the Royal Navy during World War II. She survived the war and was scrapped in 1948.

== Design and description ==
The third batch was slightly enlarged and improved over the preceding second batch of the S-class. The submarines had a length of 217 feet (66.1 m) overall, a beam of 23 feet 9 inches (7.2 m) and a draught of 14 feet 8 inches (4.5 m). They displaced 842 long tons (856 t) on the surface and 990 long tons (1,010 t) submerged. The S-class submarines had a crew of 48 officers and ratings. They had a diving depth of 300 feet (91.4 m).

For surface running, the boats were powered by two 950-brake-horsepower (708 kW) diesel engines, each driving one propeller shaft. When submerged each propeller was driven by a 650-horsepower (485 kW) electric motor. They could reach 15 knots (28 km/h; 17 mph) on the surface and 10 knots (19 km/h; 12 mph) underwater. On the surface, the third batch boats had a range of 6,000 nautical miles (11,000 km; 6,900 mi) at 10 knots (19 km/h; 12 mph) and 120 nmi (220 km; 140 mi) at 3 knots (5.6 km/h; 3.5 mph) submerged.

The boats were armed with seven 21-inch (533 mm) torpedo tubes. A half-dozen of these were in the bow and there was one external tube in the stern. They carried six reload torpedoes for the bow tubes for a grand total of thirteen torpedoes. Twelve mines could be carried in lieu of the internally stowed torpedoes. They were also armed with a 3-inch (76 mm) deck gun.

== Construction and career ==
HMS Surf was built by Cammell Laird and launched on 10 December 1942. Thus far she has been the only ship of the Royal Navy to bear the name Surf. The boat served in the Mediterranean and the Far East during the Second World War. Whilst in the Mediterranean, she damaged the German auxiliary patrol vessel GA 54 / Chiaros and sank the German merchant Sonia. On transferral to the Far East, she sank a small Japanese tug and a barge, and laid mines in the Strait of Malacca. Surf survived the war and was sold on 28 October 1949. She arrived at Faslane in July 1950 for breaking up.
