= HMS Sea Rover =

S-class submarine of the Royal Navy

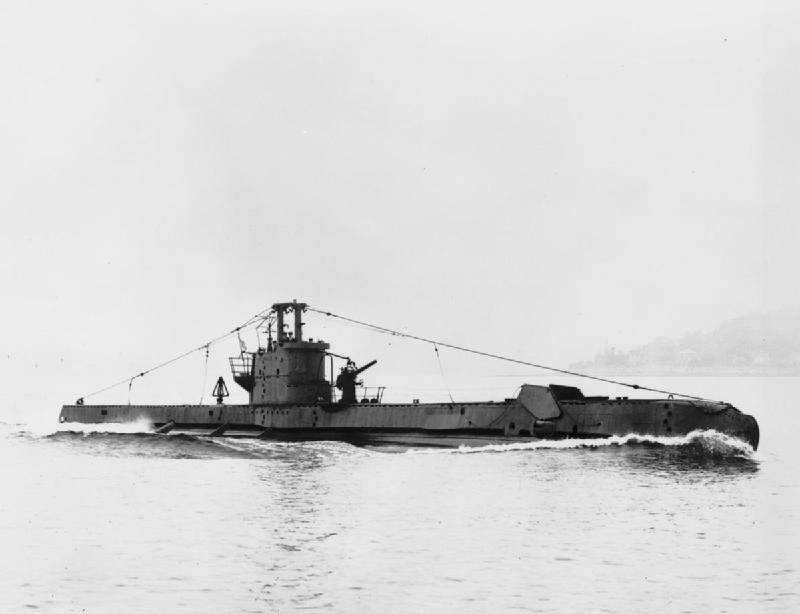
- Sea Rover

History

United Kingdom
- Name: Sea Rover
- Ordered: 4 April 1940
- Builder: Scotts, Greenock
- Laid down: 14 April 1941
- Launched: 25 February 1943
- Commissioned: 7 July 1943
- Fate: Sold for scrap, October 1949
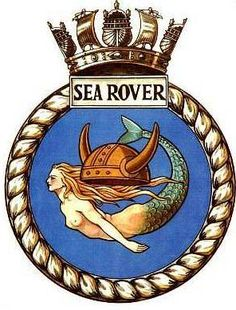
- Badge

General characteristics
- Class & type: S-class submarine
- Displacement: 865 long tons (879 t) (surfaced); 990 long tons (1,010 t) (submerged)
- Length: 217 ft (66.1 m)
- Beam: 23 ft 9 in (7.2 m)
- Draught: 14 ft 8 in (4.5 m)
- Installed power: 1,900 bhp (1,400 kW) (diesel); 1,300 hp (970 kW) (electric)
- Propulsion: 2 × diesel engines; 2 × electric motors
- Speed: 15 kn (28 km/h; 17 mph) (surfaced); 10 kn (19 km/h; 12 mph) (submerged)
- Range: 6,000 nmi (11,000 km; 6,900 mi) at 10 knots (19 km/h; 12 mph) (surfaced); 120 nmi (220 km; 140 mi) at 3 knots (5.6 km/h; 3.5 mph) (submerged)
- Test depth: 300 ft (91.4 m)
- Complement: 48
- Sensors & processing systems: Type 129AR or 138 ASDIC; Type 291W early-warning radar
- Armament: 7 × 21 in (533 mm) torpedo tubes (6 × bow, 1 × stern); 1 × 3 in (76 mm) deck gun; 1 × 20 mm (0.8 in) AA gun (possibly added later)

HMS Sea Rover was a third-batch S-class submarine built for the Royal Navy during World War II. Completed in July 1943, she conducted one war patrol off Norway, before being re-assigned to the Pacific theater. Arriving in February 1944, the boat conducted several patrols in the Strait of Malacca, sinking one transport, one gunboat, one merchant, three sailing vessels, two coasters, and one lighter. During this time, she was attacked several times by aircraft and surface ships; in one attack, she took on two tons of water from leaks caused by depth charges. Sea Rover collided with an Australian corvette in December 1944, and she was sent back to England, then the United States, for repairs. After the war ended, the boat was sent back to England, placed in reserve, then sold for scrap in October 1949.

== Design and description ==
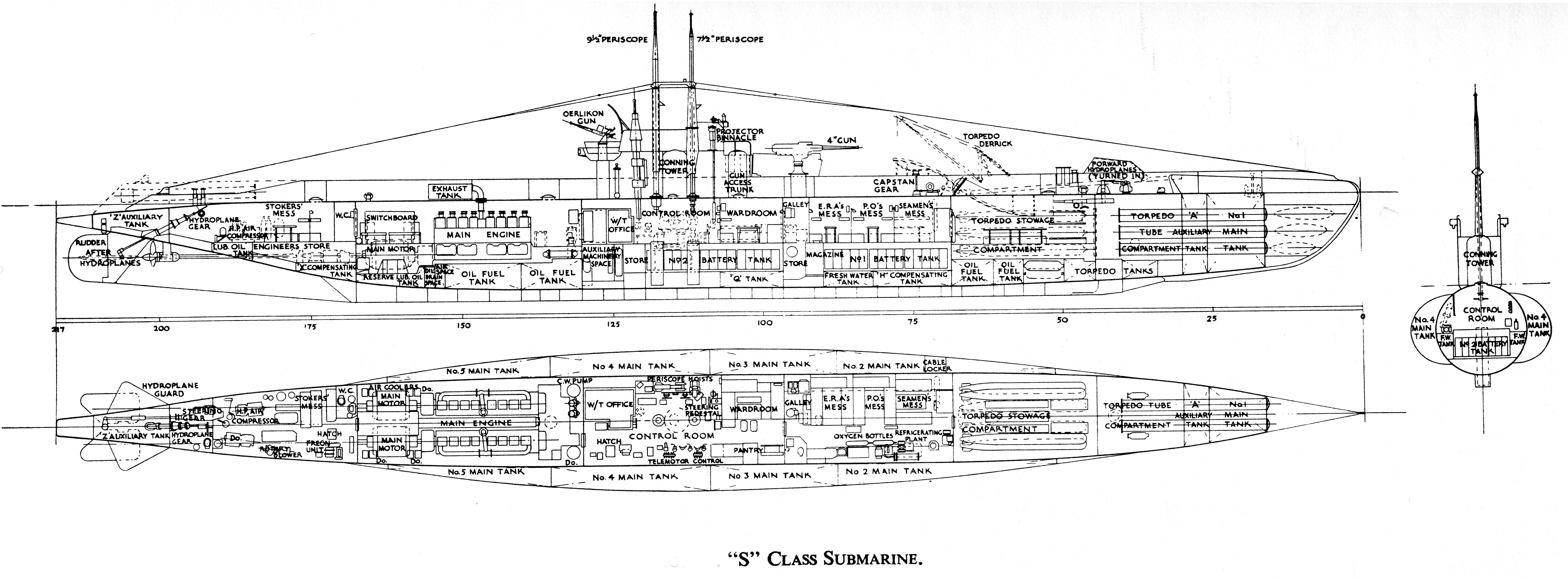
Schematic drawing of a S-class submarine

The S-class submarines were designed to patrol the restricted waters of the North Sea and the Mediterranean Sea. The third batch was slightly enlarged and improved over the preceding second batch of the S-class. The submarines had a length of 217 feet (66.1 m) overall, a beam of 23 feet 9 inches (7.2 m) and a draught of 14 feet 8 inches (4.5 m). They displaced 865 long tons (879 t) on the surface and 990 long tons (1,010 t) submerged. The S-class submarines had a crew of 48 officers and ratings. They had a diving depth of 300 feet (91.4 m).

For surface running, the boats were powered by two 950-brake-horsepower (708 kW) diesel engines, each driving one propeller shaft. When submerged each propeller was driven by a 650-horsepower (485 kW) electric motor. They could reach 15 knots (28 km/h; 17 mph) on the surface and 10 knots (19 km/h; 12 mph) underwater. On the surface, the third batch boats had a range of 6,000 nautical miles (11,000 km; 6,900 mi) at 10 knots (19 km/h; 12 mph) and 120 nmi (220 km; 140 mi) at 3 knots (5.6 km/h; 3.5 mph) submerged.

The boats were armed with seven 21 inch (533 mm) torpedo tubes. A half-dozen of these were in the bow and there was one external tube in the stern. They carried six reload torpedoes for the bow tubes for a grand total of thirteen torpedoes. Twelve mines could be carried in lieu of the internally stowed torpedoes. They were also armed with a 3-inch (76 mm) deck gun. It is uncertain if Sea Rover was completed with a 20-millimetre (0.8 in) Oerlikon light AA gun or had one added later. The third-batch S-class boats were fitted with either a Type 129AR or 138 ASDIC system and a Type 291W early-warning radar.

== Construction and career ==
HMS Sea Rover was a third-batch S-class submarine and was ordered by the British Admiralty on 4 April 1940. She was laid down in the Scotts Shipbuilding and Engineering Company shipyard in Greenock on 14 April 1941 and was launched on 25 February 1943. On 5 July 1943, Sea Rover, under the command of Lieutenant John P. Angell (known as Peter), sailed to Holy Loch, where she was commissioned into the Royal Navy two days later. Thus far, she has been the only ship to bear the name "Sea Rover".

Between July and September 1943, Sea Rover conducted exercises with various other submarines and surface ships off the River Clyde and Larne. From 9 to 24 October, the boat patrolled off Norway, but did not sight any targets. On 27 November 1943, Sea Rover was reassigned to the Pacific theater; she departed Holy Loch, and after a stay in Casablanca, left for Beirut on 22 December. She continued on through Suez and Colombo, and arrived in Trincomalee on 10 February 1944.

On 21 February 1944, the boat went on patrol in the Strait of Malacca; on 3 March she sighted a Japanese submarine, possibly the Ro-100-class submarine RO-111 and fired a full spread of six torpedoes; the submarine was seen to alter its course, possibly to evade the torpedoes, and no hits were observed. Later in the day, she sank the Japanese merchant Matsu Maru No.1 with gunfire; three days later the boat sank a Japanese coaster with gunfire from the main 76mm deck gun and the 20mm Oerlikon AA gun. On 8 March, the boat sighted a convoy of five merchant ships, with one escort; she torpedoed and sank the Japanese transport ship Shobu Maru. She then returned to Trincomalee on 13 March.

On 1 April, Sea Rover departed on patrol off Diamond Point, Sumatra; on the 10th she fired six torpedoes at a large merchant vessel, but missed. On the 20th, the boat surfaced at opened fire with her deck gun on a goods train at Lhokseumawe, Sumatra; after firing 59 shells, the train was considered destroyed. She then returned to port on the 25th. The submarine then was ordered to patrol off Penang, and on 18 May she laid a minefield of eight mines off the Malay Peninsula. Four days later, she torpedoed the Japanese gunboat Kosho Maru south of Penang harbour while attacking a convoy of two merchant ships. With only her stern torpedo remaining, she arrived in port at Trincomalee on 28 May.

The submarine commenced her next patrol on 16 June 1944; four days later, she was ineffectually bombed by an enemy aircraft. Later in the day, she sighted a Japanese submarine, probably the I-8, but could not maneuver into an attack position. In the evening of 26 June, Sea Rover was depth charged by two Japanese anti-submarine ships south of Penang, sustaining considerable damage to internal fittings and instruments, as well as taking on two tons of water in flooding. The next day, the captain decided to sink a sailing vessel with demolition charges to raise the morale of his crew, then in the following days destroyed two more sailing vessels with gunfire.

After repairs, the boat was tasked with the recovery of downed airmen over the Indian Ocean. No Allied aircraft were seen, but she was repeatedly attacked by enemy aircraft with bombs and machine-guns. After a stop at Exmouth Gulf, she ended her patrol in Fremantle, Australia. During her next two patrols, Sea Rover sank two small ships, but on 17 December the boat collided with HMAS Bunbury; temporary repairs were made to enable her to return to Britain. She arrived in Portsmouth on 13 March, then made the passage to Philadelphia under Lt. H. S. May, arriving on 26 April. The boat then underwent a refit in the Philadelphia Navy Yard until September 1945, when she returned to Britain, and was placed in reserve.

Sea Rover was sold for scrap metal in October 1949, and was broken up in Faslane, Scotland.

== Career summary ==
During her service with the Royal Navy, Sea Rover sank 9 ships for a confirmed total of 3,370 gross register tons (GRT), plus an estimated 1,000 GRT of small ships.

Date	Name of ship	Tonnage	Nationality	Fate and location
3 March 1944	Matsu Maru No.1	-	Japan	Sunk with gunfire at 04°55′N 100°12′E
6 March 1944	unidentified	~750	Japan	Sunk with gunfire at 03°31′N 99°15′E
8 March 1944	Shobu Maru	2,005	Japan	Torpedoed and sunk at 03°38′N 99°12′E
22 May 1944	Kosho Maru	1,365	Imperial Japanese Navy	Torpedoed and sunk at 04°52′N 100°16′E
27 June 1944	unidentified	~25	Japan	Sunk with demolition charges at 04°54′N 99°32′E
5 July 1944	unidentified	~50	Japan	Sunk with gunfire at 05°38′N 99°57′E
5 July 1944	unidentified	~40	Japan	Sunk with gunfire at 05°38′N 99°57′E
4 October 1944	unidentified	~80	Japan	Sunk with gunfire at 08°04′S 117°55′E
7 December 1944	unidentified	-	Japan	Sunk with gunfire at 03°12′S 118°43′E
