= HMS Shark (54S) =

British World War II era submarine (launched 1934, sunk 1940)

Coordinates: 58°18′N 5°13′E

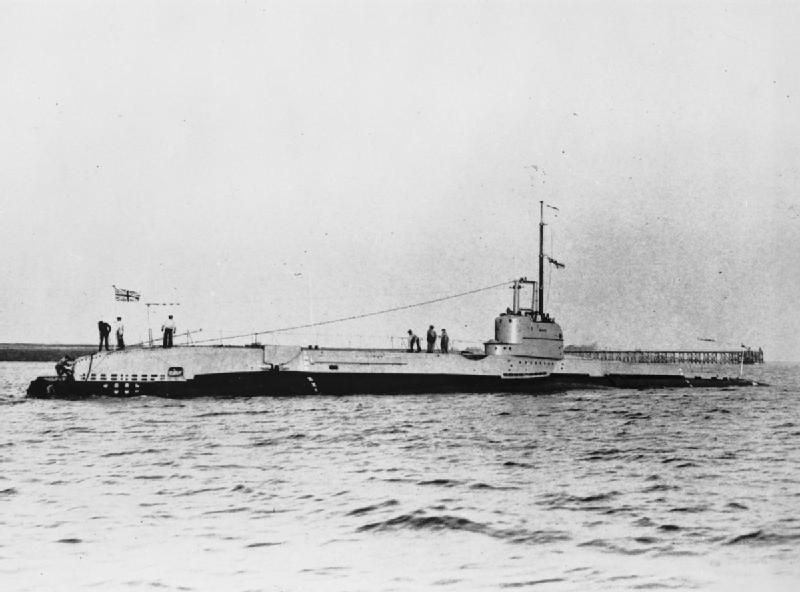
- Shark on the surface

History

United Kingdom
- Name: HMS Shark
- Ordered: 2 January 1933
- Builder: Chatham Dockyard
- Laid down: 12 June 1933
- Launched: 31 May 1934
- Commissioned: 31 December 1934
- Fate: Scuttled, 6 July 1940
- Badge

General characteristics
- Class & type: S-class submarine
- Displacement: 768 long tons (780 t) surfaced; 960 long tons (980 t) submerged
- Length: 208 ft 8 in (63.6 m)
- Beam: 24 ft 0 in (7.3 m)
- Draught: 11 ft 10 in (3.6 m)
- Installed power: 1,550 bhp (1,160 kW) (diesel); 1,300 hp (970 kW) (electric)
- Propulsion: 2 × diesel engines; 2 × electric motors
- Speed: 13.75 knots (25.47 km/h; 15.82 mph) surfaced; 10 knots (19 km/h; 12 mph) submerged
- Range: 6,000 nmi (11,000 km; 6,900 mi) at 10 knots (19 km/h; 12 mph) surface; 64 nmi (119 km; 74 mi) at 2 knots (3.7 km/h; 2.3 mph) submerged
- Test depth: 300 feet (91 m)
- Complement: 40
- Armament: 6 × bow 21 in (533 mm) torpedo tubes; 1 × 3-inch (76 mm) deck gun

HMS Shark was a second-batch S-class submarine built during the 1930s for the Royal Navy. Completed in 1934, the boat fought in the Second World War. Shark is one of twelve boats named in the song "Twelve Little S-Boats".

== Design and description ==
The second batch of S-class submarines were designed as slightly improved and enlarged versions of the earlier boats of the class and were intended to operate in the North and Baltic Seas. The submarines had a length of 208 feet 8 inches (63.6 m) overall, a beam of 24 feet 0 inches (7.3 m) and a mean draught of 11 feet 10 inches (3.6 m). They displaced 768 long tons (780 t) on the surface and 960 long tons (980 t) submerged. The S-class submarines had a crew of 40 officers and ratings. They had a diving depth of 300 feet (91 m).

For surface running, the boats were powered by two 775-brake-horsepower (578 kW) diesel engines, each driving one propeller shaft. When submerged each propeller was driven by a 650-horsepower (485 kW) electric motor. They could reach 13.75 knots (25.47 km/h; 15.82 mph) on the surface and 10 knots (19 km/h; 12 mph) underwater. On the surface, the second-batch boats had a range of 6,000 nautical miles (11,000 km; 6,900 mi) at 10 knots (19 km/h; 12 mph) and 64 nmi (119 km; 74 mi) at 2 knots (3.7 km/h; 2.3 mph) submerged.

The S-class boats were armed with six 21-inch (533 mm) torpedo tubes in the bow. They carried six reload torpedoes for a total of a dozen torpedoes. They were also armed with a 3-inch (76 mm) deck gun.

== Construction and career ==
Ordered on 12 June 1933, Shark was laid down on 15 June 1933 at HM Dockyard, Chatham and was launched on 31 May 1934. The boat was completed on 31 December 1934.

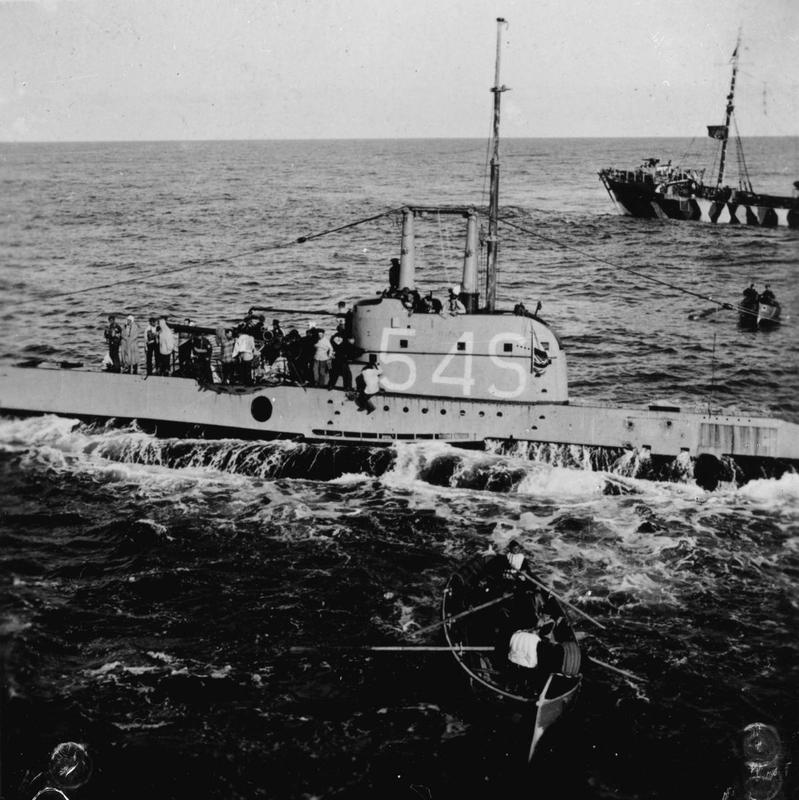
The last image of Shark, 6 July 1940, just before she was scuttled to prevent her capture by the Germans

The submarine was attacked by German aircraft while surfacing on patrol off the coast of Norway near Skudeneshavn on 5 July 1940. While trying to fight off the aircraft, the submarine succeeded in shooting down a Dornier Do 17. Due to the damage the submarine had suffered and likely further attack from the enemy aircraft overhead it was decided to surrender the submarine. The next day at about 04:00 the German minesweeping trawlers M-1803, M-1806 and M-1807 arrived at the scene and took the crew on board. Shark was taken under tow but the crew had scuttled her prior to leaving. Amidst much cheering from the captured British sailors, the German trawler crews were forced to cut the hawsers before Shark sank and took the towing vessels with her. Shark sank stern first about 25 nautical miles (46 km) west-south-west of Egersund, Norway.

== Crew ==
The boat's captain, Lieutenant Commander Peter Buckley, was involved in planning a number of escape attempts from his prisoner of war camp.

ERA W. E. "Wally" Hammond made a number of escape attempts before being held in Oflag IV-C – Colditz. With ERA Don "Tubby" Lister (from the captured submarine HMS Seal) he made a successful escape by campaigning for a transfer from Colditz, arguing that he was not an officer. He was transferred to Lamsdorf prison, escaped from a Breslau work party, and reached England via Switzerland in 1943.

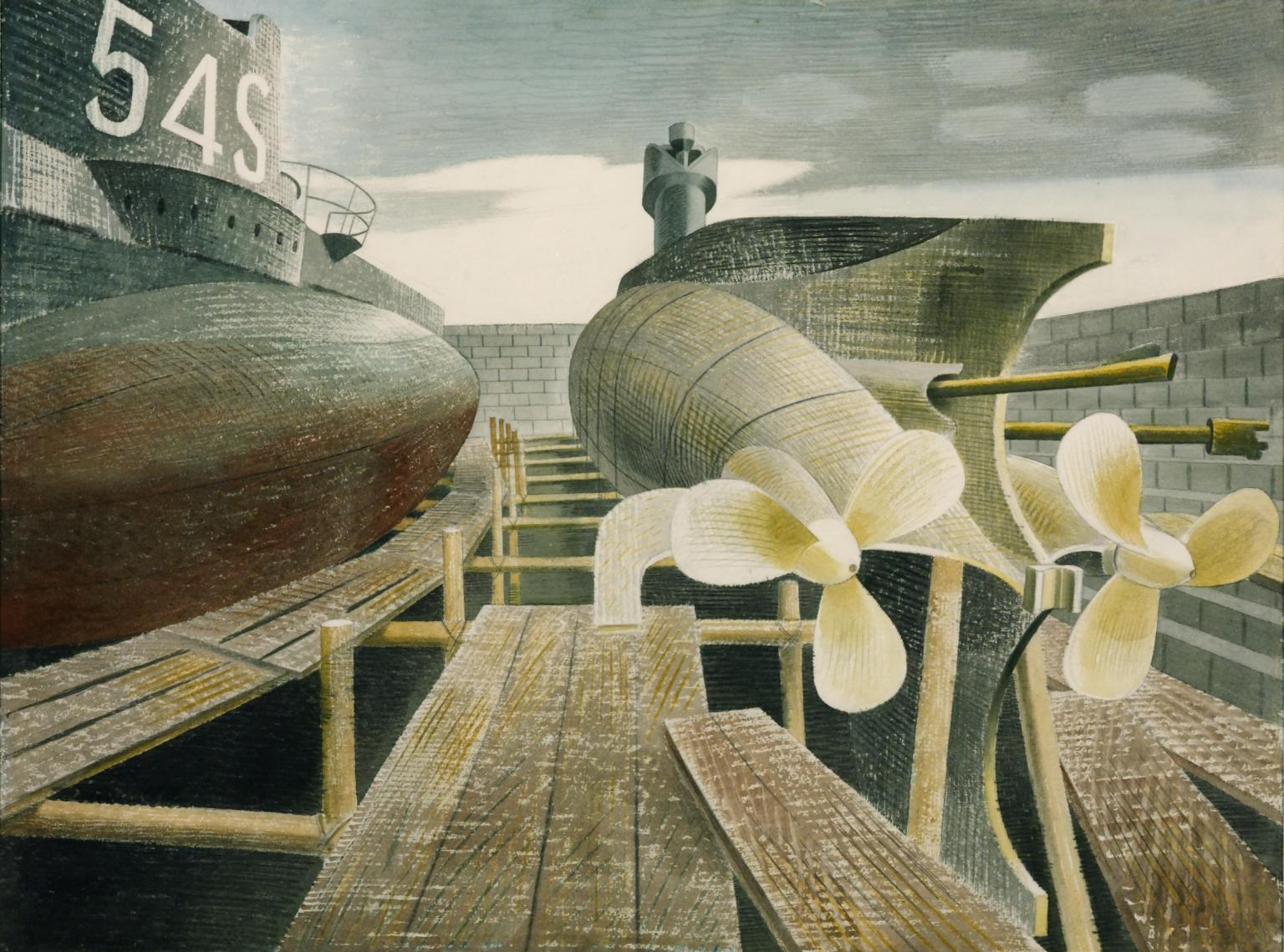
Submarines in Dry Dock by Eric Ravilious, 1940
