= List of shipwrecks in March 1944 =

The list of shipwrecks in March 1944 includes ships sunk, foundered, grounded, or otherwise lost during March 1944.

== 1 March ==
List of shipwrecks: 1 March 1944
Ship	State	Description
HMS Gould	Royal Navy	World War II: The Captain-class frigate was torpedoed and sunk in the Atlantic Ocean off Portugal by U-358 (Kriegsmarine) with the loss of 123 of her 137 crew.
HMS LCA 726	Royal Navy	The landing craft assault was lost in Home Waters.
HMS LCA 908	Royal Navy	The landing craft assault was lost in Home Waters.
Luigi Martini	Italy	World War II: The cargo ship was sunk in an Allied air raid on Chioggia, Venice.
R1N Maasburg	Kriegsmarine	World War II: The transport ship struck a mine in the North Sea 10 nautical miles (19 km) south south west of Kijkduin, South Holland, Netherlands. She was then bombed and sunk off the Zuiderhaaks Sandbank by Royal Air Force aircraft.
Saint Louis	France	World War II: The cargo ship was torpedoed and sunk in the Atlantic Ocean off Accra, Gold Coast (5°23′N 0°09′W) by U-66 (Kriegsmarine) with the loss of 85 of the 134 people on board.
U-358	Kriegsmarine	World War II: The Type VIIC submarine was depth charged, shelled and sunk in the Atlantic Ocean north of the Azores, Portugal (45°46′N 23°16′W) by HMS Affleck, HMS Garlies, HMS Gore and HMS Gould (all Royal Navy) with the loss of 50 of her 51 crew.
U-603	Kriegsmarine	World War II: The Type VIIC submarine was depth charged and sunk in the Atlantic Ocean (48°55′N 26°10′W) by USS Bronstein (United States Navy) with the loss of all 51 crew.
U-709	Kriegsmarine	World War II: The Type VIIC submarine was depth charged, shelled and sunk in the Atlantic Ocean (49°10′N 26°00′W) by USS Bostwick, USS Bronstein and USS Thomas (all United States Navy) with the loss of all 52 crew.

== 2 March ==
List of shipwrecks: 2 March 1944
Ship	State	Description
Joel R. Poinsett	United States	The Liberty ship broke in two in the Atlantic Ocean 400 nautical miles (740 km) south east of St. John's Newfoundland. Her crew abandoned ship and were rescued by a corvette. Foundation Franklin (Canada) towed the stern section to Halifax, Nova Scotia, Canada, where she was subsequently used as a depot ship.
HMS LCA (HR) 672	Royal Navy	The landing craft assault (hedgerow) foundered off eastern Scotland during exercises. (Look 02/04/1944)
HMS LCA (HR) 811	Royal Navy	The landing craft assault (hedgerow) foundered off eastern Scotland during exercises. (Look 02/04/1944)
HMS LST 362	Royal Navy	World War II: Convoy MKS 40: The landing ship tank (1,625/4,080 t, 1942) was torpedoed and sunk in the Atlantic Ocean (48°00′N 17°23′W) by U-744 (Kriegsmarine). 15 crew and 73 British troops were killed. There were 92 survivors.
Naruto	Imperial Japanese Navy	World War II: The Shiretoko-class oiler was sunk by a bomb hit in the engine room in an air attack in Karavia Bay, Rabaul, New Guinea. Raised September 1945. Beached in Karavia Bay on 26 October 1945. Refloated in 1958 and towed to Singapore where the vessel was abandoned. Probably scrapped later.
Shinkyo Maru	Japan	World War II: The cargo ship (5,139 GRT) was torpedoed and heavily damaged in the Pacific Ocean (6°22′N 148°27′E) by USS Picuda (United States Navy). 1 crew and 18 passengers were killed. Amakusa (Imperial Japanese Navy) assisted her and rescued the survivors. She sank two days later.
Thor	Germany	World War II: The cargo ship was torpedoed and sunk off Stad, Norway (62°10′N 5°05′E) by HMS Venturer (Royal Navy).

== 3 March ==
List of shipwrecks: 3 March 1944
Ship	State	Description
Adriatico	Italy	World War II: The cargo ship was sunk in an Allied air raid on Split, Yugoslavia.
Akasisan Maru	Imperial Japanese Navy	World War II: The Asahisan Maru-class auxiliary transport ship was sunk in the Pacific Ocean about 21 nautical miles (39 km; 24 mi) west of Uruppu Island, Kuril Islands (46°00′N 149°08′E) by USS Sand Lance (United States Navy) with the loss of all 45 hands, including a merchant captain and a navy captain.
Belle Isle	Kriegsmarine	World War II: The experimental ship was damaged in an air raid on Toulon, Var, France. She was declared a total loss, and was scrapped in 1945.
Belorussiya	Soviet Union	World War II: The timber carrier was torpedoed and sunk in the Sea of Okhotsk (46°28′N 149°18′E) by USS Sand Lance (United States Navy). 22 crew died in the sinking and only 2 of the 28 survivors remained alive when their boat reached the shore 20 days later.
Fort McLeod	United Kingdom	World War II: The Fort ship (7,127 GRT, 1942) was torpedoed, shelled and sunk in the Indian Ocean (2°01′N 77°06′E) by I-162 (Imperial Japanese Navy). Her crew were rescued by HMS Sluna (Royal Navy) and tug Integrity (United Kingdom).
Karatsu	Imperial Japanese Navy	World War II: The gunboat was torpedoed and damaged off the Philippines by USS Narwhal (United States Navy). Although towed to Manila for repairs, these were not completed. She was scuttled as a blockship in Manila Bay on 5 February 1945.
HMS LCS(M) 69	Royal Navy	The landing craft support (mortar) (11/13 t, 1944) sank during exercises off east Scotland.
Nittai Maru	Imperial Japanese Army	World War II: Convoy H-19: The Nittai Maru-class auxiliary transport ship was torpedoed and sunk in the Celebes Sea 290 nautical miles (540 km) north west of Halmahera, New Guinea (03°08′N 123°56′E) by USS Rasher (United States Navy). A crewman was killed.
Shirakami	Imperial Japanese Navy	The Sokuten-class minelayer collided with Nichiran Maru (Imperial Japanese Army) off Yoshino-hama in the Pacific Ocean (46°11′N 150°30′E) in a storm. Damage control failed and she broke up and sank on 5 March (45°30′N 150°00′E). Seventy survivors were rescued.
Tenyo Maru No. 2 Go	Imperial Japanese Navy	The Tenyo Maru-class naval trawler/auxiliary storeship (657 GRT, 1935) ran aground in stormy weather near Namikawai off East Paramushiro Island (50°17′N 155°55′E) and was wrecked. The whole crew was rescued between 14–16 March.

== 4 March ==
List of shipwrecks: 4 March 1944
Ship	State	Description
Anna Martini	Italy	World War II: The cargo ship was sunk in an Allied air raid on Zara, Yugoslavia.
Desdemona	Germany	World War II: The cargo ship struck a mine and sank in the Kattegat off Gilleleje, Denmark.
Empire Tourist	United Kingdom	World War II: Convoy RA 57: The cargo ship (7,062 GRT, 1942) was torpedoed and sunk in the Barents Sea east of Bear Island, Norway (73°25′N 22°11′E) by U-703 (Kriegsmarine). All 68 crew were rescued by HMS Gleaner (Royal Navy).
IV 10 Annibale Bosco A.	Kriegsmarine	The guard ship was sunk on this date.
I-O-111	Kriegsmarine	The Siebelgefäß landing craft was sunk on this date.
Joel R. Ponsett	United States	The Liberty ship broke in two in the Atlantic Ocean (43°30′N 56°30′W) and was abandoned. The stern section was towed to Halifax, Nova Scotia, Canada and put to use as a depot ship.
Kayo Maru	Imperial Japanese Army	World War II: Convoy Wewak Yuso Yoto Sakusen No. 4: The transport was torpedoed and sunk in the Pacific Ocean (1°28′S 138°40′E) by USS Peto (United States Navy). 46 of the 825 troops aboard and 43 crewmen died.
KT 42	Kriegsmarine	World War II: The submarine chaser was destroyed in an American air raid on Toulon, Var, France.
Ominesan Maru	Imperial Japanese Navy	World War II: The oiler was torpedoed and sunk in the South China Sea 300 nautical miles (560 km) west of Miri, Borneo (05°29′N 108°46′E) by USS Bluefish (United States Navy). Forty-six crewmen were killed.
Sifnos	Kriegsmarine	World War II: The coaster was sunk in Suda Bay by an Allied air attack. 59 of the 90 Italian prisoners aboard died.
U-472	Kriegsmarine	World War II: The Type VIIC submarine was sunk in the Barents Sea (73°05′N 26°40′E) by a rocket attack by Fairey Swordfish aircraft of 816 Squadron, Fleet Air Arm base on HMS Chaser and by shelling from HMS Onslaught (both Royal Navy) with the loss of 23 of her 43 crew.
UJ 6080	Kriegsmarine	World War II: The submarine chaser was destroyed in an American air raid on Toulon.
Vs 223	Kriegsmarine	World War II: The guard ship struck a mine and sank in the Baltic Sea off Neufarhwasser.

== 5 March ==
List of shipwrecks: 5 March 1944
Ship	State	Description
Diana	Sweden	World War II: The cargo ship was torpedoed and sunk in the North Sea off Schiermonnikoog, Friesland, Netherlands by Royal Air Force aircraft with the loss of two of her crew.
John Holt	United Kingdom	World War II: The cargo ship (4,964 GRT, 1943) was torpedoed and sunk in the Gulf of Guinea 60 nautical miles (110 km) south of the mouth of the Opobo River (3°56′N 7°36′E) by U-66 (Kriegsmarine). Of the 95 people on board, two were taken as prisoners of war and were lost when U-66 was sunk. The others were rescued by Empire Ruby (United Kingdom).
HMS ML 387	Royal Navy	The Fairmile B motor launch (76/86 t, 1943) was sunk by an internal explosion at Beirut, Syria.
U-366	Kriegsmarine	World War II: The Type VIIC submarine was depth charged and sunk in the Arctic Ocean north west of Hammerfest, Norway (72°10′N 14°44′E) by a Fairey Swordfish aircraft of 816 Squadron, Fleet Air Arm based on HMS Chaser (Royal Navy) with the loss of all 50 crew.
UJ 1703	Kriegsmarine	World War II: The MOB-FD-class naval trawler/submarine chaser was torpedoed and sunk by Allied aircraft off Lindesnes, Norway.

== 6 March ==
List of shipwrecks: 6 March 1944
Ship	State	Description
America Maru	Imperial Japanese Navy	World War II: The Nippon Maru-class auxiliary transport was torpedoed and sunk in the Pacific Ocean 420 nautical miles (780 km) north north west of Saipan (22°19′N 143°54′E) by USS Nautilus (United States Navy). Five hundred and ninety-nine passengers and crew were killed. There were 43 survivors.
Daniel Chester French	United States	World War II: The Liberty ship struck a mine and sank in the Mediterranean Sea off Bizerta, Algeria (37°17′N 10°22′E). 24 troops, 4 gunners and 9 crewmen killed. Survivors were rescued by HMS Charon (Royal Navy), Thelma (United Kingdom) and Rescue ( Gibraltar).
Rabe	Germany	World War II: The cargo ship was torpedoed and sunk in the North Sea off Obrestad, Norway by an air attack.
Sperrbrecher 10 Vigo	Kriegsmarine	World War II: The Sperrbrecher (7,538 GRT) struck a mine in the North Sea off Norderney and sank the next day (53°59′N 7°09′E). One crew was killed.
U-744	Kriegsmarine	World War II: The Type VIIC submarine was depth charged and sunk in the Atlantic Ocean (52°01′N 22°37′W) by HMCS Chaudiere, HMCS Chilliwack, HMCS Fennel, HMCS Gatineau, HMCS St. Catharines (all Royal Canadian Navy), HMS Icarus and HMS Kenilworth Castle (both Royal Navy) with the loss of twelve of her 52 crew.
U-973	Kriegsmarine	World War II: The Type VIIC submarine was sunk in the Norwegian Sea (70°40′N 5°48′E) by a Fairey Swordfish aircraft of 816 Squadron Fleet Air Arm based on HMS Chaser (Royal Navy) with the loss of 51 of her 66 crew.
V 1304 Eisenach	Kriegsmarine	World War II: The Vorpostenboot was sunk in the North Sea off IJmuiden, North Holland, Netherlands by HMMTB 224, HMMTB 225, HMMTB 232, HMMTB 234, HMMTB 241 and HMMTB 244 (all Royal Navy). There were 20 dead and 19 missing.
Virginia Dare	United States	World War II: The Liberty ship struck a mine in the Mediterranean Sea off Tunis, Tunisia. She was declared a total loss.

== 7 March ==
List of shipwrecks: 7 March 1944
Ship	State	Description
Charlotte	Germany	World War II: The cargo ship struck a mine (probably German) and sank in the Black Sea off Cape Lukul. One crewman was lost.
Herman Winter	United States	The 274-foot (84 m), 2,638-gross register ton cargo liner was wrecked without loss of life on Devil's Bridge, a reef off Gay Head on Martha's Vineyard off the coast of Massachusetts. Her wreck settled in up to 40 feet (12 m) of water at 41°20′57″N 070°50′50″W.
Juyo Maru	Japan	World War II: The cargo ship struck a mine and sank in the Indian Ocean off Koh Chang, Thailand.
Lippe	Germany	World War II: The cargo ship was torpedoed by HMS Sceptre (Royal Navy) at 64°32′N 10°38′E and beached in Nord-Trøndelag, Norway. She broke in two and was declared a total loss.
M 4405 Marie-Anne	Kriegsmarine	World War II: The Jacquilne-class naval trawler/ auxiliary minesweeper was torpedoed and sunk in the Bay of Biscay off La Pallice, Charente-Maritime, France by aircraft of Coastal Command, Royal Air Force.
PiLB 464	Kriegsmarine	The PiLB 40 type landing craft was lost on this date.
PiLB 485	Kriegsmarine	The PiLB 40 type landing craft was lost on this date.
USS PT-337	United States Navy	World War II: The ELCO 80'-class PT boat was shelled and sunk by shore batteries off Hansa Bay, New Guinea. One crew was killed and six missing. The five survivors were rescued on 11 March by a Consolidated PBY Catalina aircraft of the United States Navy.
TK-24	Soviet Navy	World War II: The motor torpedo boat was captured by Kriegsmarine motor torpedo boats at Ak Mechet, but it sank due to battle damage.
TK-362	Soviet Navy	The G-5-class motor torpedo boat was lost on this date.
Tarifa	Norway	World War II: Convoy AB 33: The cargo ship (7,229 GRT, 1936) was torpedoed and sunk in the Arabian Sea 250 nautical miles (460 km) east of Socotra, Mahra Sultanate (12°48′N 58°44′E) by U-510 (Kriegsmarine) with the loss of three of the 148 people on board. Survivors were rescued by HMS Avon (Royal Navy).
Unidentified fishing boats	Unknown	World War II: Three small fishing boats were sunk by HMIS ML 438 and HMIS ML 440 (both Royal Indian Navy) in Sandoway Bay, Burma.
Valera	Panama	World War II: The tanker was torpedoed and sunk in the Caribbean Sea 120 nautical miles (220 km) north of Barranquilla, Colombia (11°30′N 76°27′W) by U-518 (Kriegsmarine) with the loss of one of her 35 crew. Survivors were rescued by a United States Coast Guard ship.

== 8 March ==
List of shipwrecks: 8 March 1944
Ship	State	Description
IV 57 Ebe	Kriegsmarine	The guard ship was sunk on this date.
M 386	Kriegsmarine	World War II: The M 1940-class minesweeper, was sunk in Strander Bight by a mine. She was later salvaged and repaired.
Norco	United States	The 615-gross register ton, 150.3-foot (45.8 m) motor vessel was destroyed by fire in Tongass Harbor (54°46′30″N 130°14′30″W) on the coast of Annette Island in the Gravina Islands in the Alexander Archipelago in Southeast Alaska.
Pomona	Italy	World War II: The cargo ship was sunk in Suda Bay by an Allied air attack.
Shobu Maru	Japan	World War II: The transport ship was torpedoed and sunk in the Strait of Malacca by HMS Sea Rover (Royal Navy).
TA15	Kriegsmarine	World War II: The torpedo boat, a former Sella-class destroyer, was sunk off Heraklion, Greece by rocket firing British aircraft with the loss of 16 crew. Later raised and taken to Piraeus for repairs. She was sunk there in an Allied air raid.
Toyokuni Maru	Japan	World War II: Convoy TASA-08: The Yasukuni Maru-class ore carrier was torpedoed and damaged in the South China Sea south east of Hong Kong (19°21′N 116°09′E) by USS Lapon (United States Navy). She was taken in tow by Nichirei Maru (Japan). She was torpedoed again the next day by USS Lapon and sank in the South China Sea 350 nautical miles (650 km) of Cape Bojeador, Luzon, Philippines (19°44′N 115°52′E). Fifteen men were killed.
Zyuyo Maru	Japan	World War II: The cargo ship struck a mine and sank in the Pacific Ocean (13°10′N 100°50′E).

== 9 March ==
List of shipwrecks: 9 March 1944
Ship	State	Description
Behar	United Kingdom	World War II: The cargo ship (7,840 GRT, 1943) was shelled and sunk by Tone (Imperial Japanese Navy) in the Indian Ocean. Four crew were killed. 108 crew were taken as prisoners of war (POWs). Later 71 or 72 of the POWs were executed, and others died in captivity.
British Loyalty	United Kingdom	World War II: The tanker (6,993 GRT, 1928) was torpedoed and sunk at Addu Atoll, Maldives by U-183 (Kriegsmarine). She was salvaged and returned to use as a hulk.
Clark Mills	United States	World War II: The Liberty ship was bombed and damaged in the Mediterranean Sea off Bizerta, Algeria by Luftwaffe aircraft. She was beached but declared a total loss.
Genei Maru No. 12	Japan	World War II: The cargo ship was bombed and sunk in the Pacific Ocean off Hollandia, New Guinea by Consolidated B-24 Liberator aircraft of the United States Navy.
Hasshu Maru	Japan	World War II: The cargo ship was bombed and sunk in the Pacific Ocean off Hollandia by Consolidated B-24 Liberator aircraft of the United States Navy.
Kinka Maru	Japan	World War II: The cargo ship was bombed and sunk in the Pacific Ocean off Rabaul, New Guinea by North American B-25 Mitchell aircraft of the United States Army Air Force.
Kissho Maru No. 1	Japan	World War II: The cargo ship was bombed and sunk in the Pacific Ocean off Greenwich Island, New Guinea by Consolidated B-24 Liberator aircraft of the United States Army Air Force.
Kissho Maru No. 2 GO	Imperial Japanese Navy	The auxiliary patrol ship was lost on this date.
USS Leopold	United States Navy	World War II: Convoy CU 16: The Edsall-class destroyer escort was torpedoed and damaged in the Atlantic Ocean south of Iceland by U-255 (Kriegsmarine) with the loss of 171 of her 199 crew. She was abandoned and sank the next day. Survivors were rescued by USS Joyce (United States Navy).
Mankei Maru	Japan	World War II: The cargo ship was bombed and sunk in the Pacific Ocean off Rabaul by North American B-25 Mitchell aircraft of the United States Army Air Force.
HM MTB 266	Royal Navy	World War II: The ELCO 70'-class motor torpedo boat (27/32 t, 1941) was heavily damaged by enemy gunfire. She sank at Alexandria, Egypt on 17 April.
Nichirei Maru	Japan	World War II: Convoy TASA-08: The Standard Type 1K ore carrier was torpedoed and sunk in the South China Sea 350 nautical miles (650 km) west of Cape Bojeador, Luzon, Philippines (19°44′N 115°52′E) by USS Lapon (United States Navy) while towing Toyokuni Maru (Japan). Six gunners and 46 crewmen were killed.
PC-59	Yugoslav Partisans	World War II: The patrol boat was sunk by HM MTB 649 (Royal Navy).
Yashima Maru	Japan	World War II: The cargo ship was bombed and sunk in the Pacific Ocean off Hollandia by Consolidated B-24 Liberator aircraft of the United States Navy.

== 10 March ==
List of shipwrecks: 10 March 1944
Ship	State	Description
HMS Asphodel	Royal Navy	World War II: Convoy SL 150: The Flower-class corvette (925/1,170 t, 1940) was torpedoed and sunk in the Atlantic Ocean west north west of Cape Finisterre, Spain (45°24′N 18°09′W) by U-575 (Kriegsmarine) with the loss of 92 of her 97 crew. Survivors were rescued by HMS Clover (Royal Navy).
Rabe	Germany	World War II: The 229.6-foot (70.0 m), 994-ton cargo vessel struck a naval mine and sank.
USS SC-700	United States Navy	The submarine chaser burned at Vella Lavella, Solomon Islands in a refueling accident. One man died and seven were missing.
S-54	Soviet Navy	World War II: The S-class submarine struck a mine and sank in Syltefjord, Norway with all 50 hands.
Sangigi	Italy	World War II: The cargo ship was bombed and sunk by aircraft at Dubrovnik, Yugoslavia.
Tsukikawa Maru	Imperial Japanese Army	World War II: The Yukikawa Maru-class transport was torpedoed and damaged at 01°52′S 128°12′E by USS Bowfin (United States Navy). She sank the next day when torpedoed again by Bowfin while under tow at 01°25′S 128°14′E. Two crewmen and four troops were killed.
U-343	Kriegsmarine	World War II: The Type VIIC submarine was depth charged and sunk in the Mediterranean Sea off the coast of Tunisia (38°07′N 9°41′E) by HMT Mull (Royal Navy) with the loss of all 51 crew.
U-450	Kriegsmarine	World War II: The Type VIIC submarine was depth charged and sunk in the Tyrrhenian Sea off Ostia, Italy (41°11′N 12°27′E) by HMS Blankney, HMS Blencathra, HMS Brecon, HMS Exmoor (all Royal Navy) and USS Madison (United States Navy). All 42 crew survived.
U-625	Kriegsmarine	U-625 World War II: The Type VIIC submarine was depth charged and sunk in the Bay of Biscay (52°35′N 20°19′W) by a Short Sunderland aircraft of 422 Squadron, Royal Canadian Air Force with the loss of all 52 crew.
U-845	Kriegsmarine	World War II: The Type IXC/40 submarine was depth charged and sunk in the Atlantic Ocean (48°20′N 20°33′W) by HMS Forester (Royal Navy), HMCS Owen Sound, HMCS St. Laurent and HMCS Swansea (all Royal Canadian Navy) with the loss of ten of her 55 crew.
William B. Woods	United States	World War II: The Liberty ship was torpedoed and damaged in the Mediterranean Sea off Palermo, Sicily, Italy (38°36′N 13°54′E) by U-952 (Kriegsmarine) with the loss of 52 of the 478 people on board. Survivors were rescued by Aretusa (Regia Marina) and two Fairmile B motor launches (Royal Navy).

== 11 March ==
List of shipwrecks: 11 March 1944
Ship	State	Description
André Lebon	Vichy France	World War II: The barge was bombed and sunk in an American air raid on Toulon, Var. She was refloated on 5 May 1945. Subsequently repaired and returned to service.
Carmen	Germany	World War II: The cargo ship was bombed and sunk in an American air raid on Toulon.
Dupleix	French Navy	World War II: The forward half of Suffren-class heavy cruiser, which had been salvaged in two halves in 1943, was sunk in an American air raid on Toulon. The stern half sank four days later.
F 884D	Kriegsmarine	The MFP-D landing craft was sunk on this date.
F 888D	Kriegsmarine	The MFP-D landing craft was sunk on this date.
Kerry Coast	United Kingdom	The ship collided with Mosdale (Norway) and sank in the River Mersey at Birkenhead, Cheshire. She was later refloated, repaired and returned to service.
M 6000 Altino	Kriegsmarine	The auxiliary minesweeper was bombed and sunk at Toulon by Allied aircraft.
M 6024	Kriegsmarine	World War II: The minesweeper, a former Crabe-class naval tugboat, was bombed and sunk at Toulon by Allied aircraft.
UIT-22	Kriegsmarine	World War II: The Liuzzi-class submarine was bombed and sunk in the South Atlantic south of the Cape of Good Hope, South Africa (41°28′S 17°40′E) by South African Air Force aircraft with the loss of all 43 crew.
U-380	Kriegsmarine	World War II: The Type VIIC submarine was sunk at Toulon in an American air raid with the loss of one life.
U-410	Kriegsmarine	World War II: The Type VIIC submarine was bombed and sunk at Toulon in an American air raid.

== 12 March ==
List of shipwrecks: 12 March 1944
Ship	State	Description
Kilissi	Germany	World War II: The banana boat was sunk off the mouth of the Ebro by Royal Air Force aircraft. Ten crewmen were killed.
Okinoyama Maru No.3	Japan	World War II: The cargo ship was torpedoed and sunk in the Pacific Ocean off Truk, South Pacific Mandate by USS Gato (United States Navy).
Brake	Imperial Japanese Navy	World War II: The tanker was shelled and sunk in the Indian Ocean by HMS Roebuck (Royal Navy). Survivors were rescued by U-168 (Kriegsmarine).
Taijin Maru	Japan	World War II: The cargo ship was torpedoed and sunk in the Pacific Ocean south east of Okinawa by USS Flying Fish (United States Navy).
Virginia Dare	United States	World War II: The Liberty ship struck a mine and was damaged in the Mediterranean Sea. She was towed to Tunis, Tunisia but broke in two and was declared a constructive total loss.

== 13 March ==
List of shipwrecks: 13 March 1944
Ship	State	Description
Belle Isle	Germany	World War II: The accommodation ship was sunk in an American air raid on Toulon, Var, France. The wreck was scrapped in 1945.
F 513C	Kriegsmarine	The MFP-C landing craft was sunk on this date.
F 588C	Kriegsmarine	The MFP-C landing craft was sunk on this date.
H. D. Collier	United States	World War II: The tanker was torpedoed, shelled and damaged in the Indian Ocean 300 nautical miles (560 km; 350 mi) south south west of Karachi, India (21°30′N 66°11′E) by I-26 (Imperial Japanese Navy). Twelve gunners and 33 crewmen were killed. Survivors rescued by Empire Raja (United Kingdom) and Karagola (British India). She sank on 16 March.
I-O-72	Kriegsmarine	The Siebelgefäß landing craft was sunk on this date.
Kokuyo Maru	Japan	World War II: convoy Higashi Matsu No. 2: The transport was torpedoed and sunk in the Pacific Ocean 40 nautical miles (74 km) south of Hachijō-jima (32°52′N 139°12′E) by USS Sand Lance (United States Navy). Survivors were rescued by Hirado (Imperial Japanese Navy)
HMS LCA(HR) 689	Royal Navy	The landing craft assault (hedgerow) (8.5/11.5 t, 1943) was lost in Home Waters.
HMS LCP(S) 76	Royal Navy	The landing craft personnel (small) (3/5.5 t, 1943) was lost on this date.
M 3113	Kriegsmarine	The KSK-2-class naval drifter/minesweeper was lost on this date.
Peleus	Greece	World War II: The cargo ship (4,695 GRT, 1928) was torpedoed and sunk in the South Atlantic (approximately 2°S 10°W) by U-852 (Kriegsmarine). The crew was massacred by the Germans to hide the traces of the attack. Three of her 35 crew survived and were rescued by Alexandre Silva (Portugal).
Ryua Maru	Japan	World War II: The cargo ship was torpedoed and sunk in the Pacific Ocean (47°49′N 152°45′E) by USS Tautog (United States Navy). Lost with all on board (58 passengers, 23 gunners and 43 crewmen).
Shojen Maru	Japan	World War II: The cargo ship was torpedoed and sunk in the Pacific Ocean 4.0 nautical miles (7.5 km) west of Eashima Jima by USS Tautog (United States Navy). Forty-two passengers and fourteen crewmen were killed.
Tatsuta	Imperial Japanese Navy	World War II: convoy Higashi Matsu No. 2: The Tenryū-class cruiser was torpedoed and sunk in the Pacific Ocean 40 nautical miles (74 km) south of Hachijō-jima (32°52′N 139°12′E) by USS Sand Lance (United States Navy). Twenty-six crewmen were lost, ten were wounded. Survivors were rescued by Nowaki and Uzuki (both Imperial Japanese Navy).
U-575	Kriegsmarine	World War II: The Type VIIC submarine was depth charged and sunk in the Atlantic Ocean (46°18′N 27°34′W) by Grumman TBM Avenger aircraft based on USS Bogue (United States Navy, Boeing B-17 Flying Fortress and Vickers Wellington aircraft of 172, 206 and 220 Squadrons, Royal Air Force; and also by USS Haverfield, USS Hobson (both United States Navy) and HMCS Prince Rupert (Royal Canadian Navy) with the loss of eighteen of her 55 crew.
Vs 156 Fortuna	Kriegsmarine	The Vorpostenboot was lost on this date.

== 14 March ==
List of shipwrecks: 14 March 1944
Ship	State	Description
Irma	Germany	The cargo ship ran aground and was wrecked off Trondheim, Norway.
Kasuga Maru No. 2 GO	Imperial Japanese Navy	The auxiliary guard ship was lost on this date.
M 3630 Stoomloodsvaarturg 5	Kriegsmarine	World War II: The auxiliary minesweeper was torpedoed and sunk in the English Channel off Gravelines, Nord by HMMTB 353 (Royal Navy) with the loss of 18 lives.
Standard	United States	The dredge was destroyed by fire at Arlington, Florida.
Ter	France	World War II: The steam trawler was bombed and sunk 40 kilometres (25 mi) off Penmarc'h, France. Four of her fourteen crew were killed in the bombing and six died of exposure before the others were rescued.

== 15 March ==
List of shipwrecks: 15 March 1944
Ship	State	Description
Chinal Mail	United States	World War II: The cargo ship was damaged in a Luftwaffe air raid on Naples, Italy. She was subsequently repaired and returned to service.
Dupleix	French Navy	World War II: The stern half of Suffren-class heavy cruiser, which had been salvaged in two halves in 1943, sank due to damage suffered in an American air raid on Toulon four days earlier. The forward half had sunk on the day of the raid.
Empire Ace	United Kingdom	World War II: The tug (275 GRT, 1943) was sunk at Malta in an air raid. Salvaged on 10 May, repaired and returned to service.
Europa	Germany	The cargo ship was lost in a collision off Stavanger, Norway.
HMS MTB 417	Royal Navy	World War II: The MTB 412-class motor torpedo boat (44/51 t, 1942) was sunk in an attack on Kriegsmarine minesweepers off cap Blanc Nez, France with all 19 hands.
Ruth Geiss	Germany	World War II: The coaster struck a mine and sank in the Baltic Sea off Swinemünde.
SF 192	Kriegsmarine	The Siebel ferry was lost on this date.
SF 276	Kriegsmarine	The Siebel ferry was lost on this date.
Strauss	Germany	World War II: The cargo ship struck a mine and sank in the Bay of Kiel.
U-653	Kriegsmarine	World War II: The Type VIIC submarine was torpedoed and sunk by a Fairey Swordfish of HMS Vindex and by gunfire from HMS Starling and HMS Wild Goose (all Royal Navy).
V 722 Pilote XIII	Kriegsmarine	World War II: The Vorpostenboot struck a mine and sank off Brest, France. 24 crew were lost.
Vs 54 Burg	Kriegsmarine	World War II: The guard ship struck a mine and sank in the Baltic Sea off Fehmarn. The crew was rescued.

== 16 March ==
List of shipwrecks: 16 March 1944
Ship	State	Description
Anzan Maru	Japan	World War II: The cargo ship was torpedoed and sunk in the Pacific Ocean (27°41′N 128°41′E) by USS Flying Fish (United States Navy). Six crew were killed.
El Madina	United Kingdom	World War II: The cargo liner (3,962 GRT, 1937) was torpedoed and sunk in the Indian Ocean by Ro-111 (Imperial Japanese Navy). Ten crew, six gunners and 364 troops died. The steamship Løvstad (United Kingdom) rescued the 814 survivors.
Kofuku Maru	Japan	World War II: The cargo ship was torpedoed and sunk in the Pacific Ocean west of the Mariana Islands by USS Silversides (United States Navy).
Nichiren Maru	Japan	World War II: The cargo liner was torpedoed and sunk in the Pacific Ocean (42°18′N 145°11′E by USS Tautog (United States Navy). 1850 troops, eight gunners and 66 crewmen died, most in the freezing water. Only 35 men are rescued.
StuBo 1066	Kriegsmarine	The StuBo42 type landing craft/motor launch was sunk on this date.
Shirakumo	Imperial Japanese Navy	World War II: The Fubuki-class destroyer was torpedoed and sunk in the Pacific Ocean 170 nautical miles (310 km) east of Muroran, Hokkaido (42°25′N 144°55′E by USS Tautog (United States Navy) with the loss of all 219 crew.
U-392	Kriegsmarine	World War II: The Type VIIC submarine was depth charged and sunk in the Strait of Gibraltar (35°55′N 5°41′W) by HMS Affleck, HMS Vanoc (both Royal Navy) and three Consolidated PBY Catalina aircraft of the United States Navy with the loss of all 52 crew.
UJ-2209 Minerva	Kriegsmarine	World War II: The submarine chaser was sunk in an Allied air raid on Livorno.

== 17 March ==
List of shipwrecks: 17 March 1944
Ship	State	Description
Dempo	Netherlands	World War II: Convoy SNF 17: The troopship was torpedoed and sunk in the Mediterranean Sea 30 nautical miles (56 km) north north east of Bougie, Algeria (37°08′N 5°27′E) by U-371 (Kriegsmarine). All 333 people on board survived. Dempo was on a voyage from Naples, Italy to Oran, Algeria.
Maiden Creek	United States	World War II: Convoy SNF 17: The Type C2 cargo ship was torpedoed and damaged in the Mediterranean Sea 30 nautical miles (56 km) north north east of Bougie (37°08′N 5°27′E) by U-371 (Kriegsmarine) with the loss of eight of the 78 people on board. She was beached at Bougie but broke in two and was declared a constructive total loss.
NB-2 Koca	Yugoslav Partisans	World War II: The gunboat was sunk by S 36 and S 61 (Kriegsmarine). One killed, three wounded.
USS PT-283	United States Navy	World War II: The Higgins 78'-class PT boat was directing the fire of USS Guest (United States Navy) off Bougainville, Solomon Islands (06°27′S 155°08′E) when she was hit by a shell fired by the destroyer and sunk with the loss of four lives.
U-28	Kriegsmarine	The Type VIIC submarine was sunk at Neustadt in Holstein, Schleswig Holstein in a training accident. Later raised but declared a total loss.
U-801	Kriegsmarine	World War II: The Type IXC/40 submarine was sunk in the Atlantic Ocean (16°42′N 30°20′W) by USS Bronstein, USS Corry and two Grumman TBM Avenger aircraft based on USS Block Island (all United States Navy) with the loss of ten of her 57 crew.
U-1013	Kriegsmarine	The Type VIIC/41 submarine collided with U-286 (Kriegsmarine) in the Baltic Sea east of Rügen, Mecklenburg-Vorpommern (54°21′N 13°58′E) and sank with the loss of 25 of her 51 crew.

== 18 March ==
List of shipwrecks: 18 March 1944
Ship	State	Description
Carducci	Germany	World War II: The cargo ship was sunk during an Allied air raid on Livorno, Italy. She was refloated in January 1947 and scrapped in 1948.
CHa-10	Imperial Japanese Navy	World War II: Wewak Transportation Convoy No. 21: The auxiliary submarine chaser was shelled and sunk in the Bismarck Sea at Mushu Island, Wewak New Guinea (03°33′S 143°38′E) by USS Daly (United States Navy). Lost with all hands.
Gyoraitei No. 402 and Gyoraitei No. 453	Imperial Japanese Navy	World War II: The Gyoraitei No. 23-class motor torpedo boats were sunk by British aircraft off Boronga, Burma.
Hokuroku Maru	Imperial Japanese Navy	World War II: Convoy HI-48: The Kenai Maru-class auxiliary transport (a.k.a. Hokuriku Maru) was torpedoed, blew up and sank in the South China Sea 160 nautical miles (300 km) east south east of Hong Kong (19°24′N 116°50′E) by USS Lapon (United States Navy). Eight military passengers, 25 guards, and 55 crewmen were killed.
M 3130	Kriegsmarine	The KSK-2-class naval drifter/minesweeper was lost in a collision.
Megnamom	Kriegsmarine	World War II: The Type A Marinefährprahm struck a mine and was damaged in the Aegean Sea off Navarino, Greece. She was sunk the next day by Allied aircraft.
Nancy Moller	United Kingdom	World War II: The cargo ship was torpedoed and sunk in the Indian Ocean south west of Colombo, Ceylon (02°14′N 78°25′E) by I-165 (Imperial Japanese Navy). The submarine surfaced and captured two Chinese crewmen and one gunner. The Chinese were executed and the gunner made a prisoner of war. The submarine then machine gunned the lifeboats killing two gunners and 30 crewmen. The master, four gunners and 27 crewmen were rescued by HMS Emerald (Royal Navy) on 22 March.
SF 270	Kriegsmarine	World War II: The Siebel ferry struck a mine and was damaged in the Adriatic Sea off Navarino. She was sunk the next day by Allied aircraft.
SF 273	Kriegsmarine	World War II: The Siebel ferry struck a mine and sank in the Adriatic Sea off Navarino.
SF 274	Kriegsmarine	World War II: The Siebel ferry struck a mine and sank in the Adriatic Sea off Navarino.

== 19 March ==
List of shipwrecks: 19 March 1944
Ship	State	Description
CHa-47	Imperial Japanese Navy	World War II: Wewak Transportation Convoy No. 21: The auxiliary submarine chaser was bombed, strafed and sunk in the Bismark Sea 50 nautical miles (93 km) north of Wewak, New Guinea by Douglas A-20 Havoc aircraft of the 3rd Bomb Group; Consolidated B-24 Liberator, North American B-25 Mitchell aircraft of the 345th Bomb Group, and Lockheed P-38 Lightning aircraft of the United States Fifth Air Force. Lost with all hands.
CHa-49	Imperial Japanese Navy	World War II: Wewak Transportation Convoy No. 21: The auxiliary submarine chaser was bombed, strafed and sunk in the Bismark Sea 50 nautical miles (93 km) north of Wewak, New Guinea by Douglas A-20 Havoc aircraft of the 3rd Bomb Group; Consolidated B-24 Liberator, North American B-25 Mitchell aircraft of the 345th Bomb Group, and Lockheed P-38 Lightning aircraft of the United States Fifth Air Force. Lost with all hands.
Eleni	Greece	World War II: The Greek motor schooner was sunk in the Bay of Corinth by Greek Partizans. Later raised and repaired by her owner.
John A. Poor	United States	World War II: The Liberty ship was torpedoed and sunk in the Arabian Sea (13°58′N 70°30′E) by U-510 (Kriegsmarine) with the loss of nine gunners and 43 crewmen. Survivors were rescued by Fort Walsh (United Kingdom).
M 3122	Kriegsmarine	The KSK-2-class naval drifter/minesweeper was lost on this date.
SF 270	Kriegsmarine	The Siebel ferry was lost on this date.
SF 273	Kriegsmarine	The Siebel ferry was lost on this date.
SF 274	Kriegsmarine	The Siebel ferry was lost on this date.
Seakay	United States	World War II: Convoy CU 17: The tanker was torpedoed and sunk in the Atlantic Ocean 375 nautical miles (694 km) west of the Fastnet Rock (51°10′N 20°20′W) by U-311 (Kriegsmarine) with the loss of one of the 85 people on board. Survivors were rescued by USS Reeves (United States Navy).
Taiei Maru	Imperial Japanese Army	World War II: Wewak Transportation Convoy No. 21: The transport was bombed, strafed and sunk in the Bismarck Sea 50 nautical miles (93 km) north of Wewak, New Guinea by Douglas A-20 Havoc aircraft of the 3rd Bomb Group; Consolidated B-24 Liberator, North American B-25 Mitchell aircraft of the 345th Bomb Group, and Lockheed P-38 Lightning aircraft of the United States Fifth Air Force. Lost with all hands, Fifty troops and 78 crewmen.
U-1059	Kriegsmarine	World War II: The Type VIIF submarine was sunk in the Atlantic Ocean south west of the Cape Verde Islands (13°06′N 33°26′W) by Grumman TBF Avenger and Grumman F4F Wildcat aircraft based on USS Block Island (United States Navy) with the loss of 47 of her 55 crew.
Yakumo Maru	Imperial Japanese Army	World War II: Wewak Transportation Convoy No. 21: The Shinryu Maru-class auxiliary transport was bombed, strafed and sunk in the Bismarck Sea 50 nautical miles (93 km) north of Wewak, New Guinea by Douglas A-20 Havoc aircraft of the 3rd Bomb Group; Consolidated B-24 Liberator, North American B-25 Mitchell aircraft of the 345th Bomb Group, and Lockheed P-38 Lightning aircraft of the United States Fifth Air Force. Forty-eight troops and 62 crewmen were lost. CHa-35 (Imperial Japanese Navy) rescues Yakumo Maru's third officer the next day, the convoy's sole survivor.

== 20 March ==
List of shipwrecks: 20 March 1944
Ship	State	Description
HMS Graph	Royal Navy	The decommissioned Type VIIC submarine broke its tow, drifted aground off Could Point, Islay (55°48′06″N 6°28′30″W) and was wrecked.
Hakuyo Maru	Imperial Japanese Navy	World War II: Convoy 4318B: The auxiliary net layer was torpedoed and sunk in the Pacific Ocean off the Nanpō Islands 30 nautical miles (56 km; 35 mi) northeast of Torishima (30°53′06″N 140°42′00″E) by USS Pollack (United States Navy). 28 crewmen were killed.
Hoko Maru	Imperial Japanese Navy	World War II: The Manko Maru-class auxiliary storeship (1,521 GRT) was torpedoed and sunk in the Pacific Ocean 32 nautical miles (59 km; 37 mi) north of Yap, Caroline Islands (10°09′N 138°10′E) by USS Picuda (United States Navy). 29 crewmen were killed.
Kaiun Maru	Japan	World War II: The cargo ship was sunk in an air attack at Rabaul, New Guinea.
NB-1 Krava	Yugoslav Partisans	World War II: The gunboat was sunk by German aircraft. One killed, two wounded.
NB-6 Napredak	Yugoslav Partisans	World War II: The gunboat was sunk by German aircraft.
Rekum	Germany	World War II: The tanker was shelled and sunk in the English Channel off Boulogne, Pas de Calais, France by British shore-based artillery.
Santa Paola	Germany	World War II: The cargo ship was scuttled at Porti di Lido, Italy. She was refloated post-war and scrapped.
Sperrbrecher 163 Friesland	Kriegsmarine	World War II: The Sperrbrecher struck a mine and sank in the Skagerrak.
Taiho Maru	Imperial Japanese Navy	World War II: The picket ship was sunk in an air attack at Rabaul, New Guinea.
V 211 Seydlitz	Kriegsmarine	World War II: The Vorpostenboot was sunk in the English Channel north east of Barfleur, Manche, France by British aircraft.
Wirpi	Finland	World War II: The cargo ship struck a mine and sank in the North Sea off Cuxhaven, Germany. The whole crew was rescued.
USS YP-331	United States Navy	The yard patrol boat began to take water probably due to seams breaking open and was abandoned in sinking condition by her seven crew who were rescued. She was taken in tow but drifted away and foundered in a storm in the Gulf of Mexico north of Key West, Florida (24°56′N 81°57′W).

== 21 March ==
List of shipwrecks: 21 March 1944
Ship	State	Description
Grena	Norway	World War II: The tanker (8,117 GRT, 1934) was torpedoed and sunk in the Indian Ocean (20°48′N 59°38′E) by I-26 (Imperial Japanese Navy) with the loss of seven of her 42 crew.
Matadian	United Kingdom	World War II: The tanker (4,275 GRT, 1936) was torpedoed and sunk in the Atlantic Ocean (5°07′N 4°47′E) by U-66). All 47 crew were rescued by HMML 282 (Royal Navy).

== 22 March ==
List of shipwrecks: 22 March 1944
Ship	State	Description
Cattaro	Germany	World War II: The passenger ship, an auxiliary cruiser, was scuttled at Livorno, Italy. She was further damaged in an air raid on 14 June. Raised in 1945, scrapped in 1947.
Narvik	Norway	World War II: The coaster (241 GRT, 1895) was shelled and sunk in the Norwegian Sea off Rødøya by HMS Syrtis (Royal Navy) with the loss of sixteen of the 25 people on board.
Watuka	Canada	World War II: Convoy SH 124: The cargo ship (1,621 GRT, 1918) was torpedoed and sunk in the Atlantic Ocean south east of Halifax, Nova Scotia (44°30′N 62°51′W) by U-802 (Kriegsmarine) with the loss of one of her 26 crew. Survivors were rescued by HMCS Anticosti (Royal Canadian Navy).

== 23 March ==
List of shipwrecks: 23 March 1944
Ship	State	Description
Hokko Maru	Japan	The cargo ship was wrecked near the Inubōsaki Lighthouse, Cape Inubō (35°42′N 140°53′E).
HSL 2706	Royal Navy	World War II: The rescue launch was sunk in error by two Republic P-47 Thunderbolt aircraft in the North Sea. Eleven crewmen were killed or died of wounds, there were only two survivors.
I-42	Imperial Japanese Navy	World War II: The Type B submarine was torpedoed and sunk in the Pacific Ocean 6 nautical miles (11 km) off Angaur Palau (06°40′N 134°03′E) by USS Tunny (United States Navy) with a loss of all 102 crewmen.
HMS LCP(R) 1026	Royal Navy	The landing craft personnel (ramped) (6/8 t, 1943) sank in the Mediterranean Sea.
USS LCT-315	United States Navy	The landing craft tank was sunk at Eniwetok by the accidental explosion of her ammunition cargo. One hundred and twelve men were wounded, ten seriously, and five men were killed.
Malahat	Canada	The cargo ship was wrecked off Cape Beale, Canada.
PC-5	Yugoslav Partisans	World War II: The patrol boat was sunk by German aircraft.
PC-70 Mandina	Yugoslav Partisans	World War II: The patrol boat was sunk by German aircraft.
SF 277	Kriegsmarine	World War II: The Siebel ferry was sunk at Tkon, Pasman Island, Croatia by Curtiss Kittyhawk aircraft of 3 Squadron, Royal Australian Air Force.
SF 278	Kriegsmarine	World War II: The Siebel ferry was sunk at Tkon, Pasman Island, Croatia by Curtiss Kittyhawk aircraft of 3 Squadron, Royal Australian Air Force.

== 24 March ==
List of shipwrecks: 24 March 1944
Ship	State	Description
Artemis Ward	United States	The Liberty ship collided with the tanker Manassas (United States in the Irish Sea and was beached in Angle Bay. Subsequently selected for scuttling off the coast of Normandy during Operation Overlord.
Bengal Maru	Imperial Japanese Army	World War II: Convoy H-22: The Somedono Maru-class transport was torpedoed and sunk in the Pacific Ocean 28 nautical miles (52 km) east of Cape Chinaka, Mindanao, Philippine Islands (05°37′N 125°58′E) by USS Bowfin (United States Navy). Forty-one crewmen, four gunners and 161 passengers were lost.
Gyoraitei No. 4	Imperial Japanese Navy	World War II: The Gyoraitei No. 1-class motor torpedo boat was bombed and sunk at Wake Island by US Army Consolidated B-24 Liberator aircraft.
I-32	Imperial Japanese Navy	World War II: The Type B submarine was depth charged, hedgehoged, mousetrapped and sunk with all hands in the Pacific Ocean 50 nautical miles (93 km) south of Wotje Atoll (08°30′N 170°10′E) by USS Manlove, USS Halsey Powell, and USS PC-1135 (all United States Navy).
I-O-69	Kriegsmarine	World War II: The Siebelgefäß landing craft was sunk by aircraft off Jelsa, Hvar, Croatia.
Schwabenland	Germany	World War II: The Schwabenland-class seaplane carrier was torpedoed and damaged in Flekkefjord, Norway, by the submarine HMS Terrapin (Royal Navy) and beached. Later salvaged and used as a hulk. Scuttled postwar on 31 December 1946 as a means of disposing of chemical weapons which had been loaded on board.
Nordnorge	Norway	World War II: The coaster (339 GRT, 1883) was torpedoed and sunk in the Barents Sea off Honningsvåg, Norway by HMS Satyr (Royal Navy) with the loss of eleven of her thirteen crew.
Shinkyo Maru	Imperial Japanese Navy	World War II: Convoy H-22: The Shinkyo Maru-class transport was torpedoed and sunk in the Pacific Ocean 28 nautical miles (52 km) east of Cape Chinaka, Mindanao, Philippine Islands (05°37′N 125°58′E) by USS Bowfin (United States Navy). Twelve crewmen and 49 passengers were lost.
U-1102	Kriegsmarine	The Type VIIC submarine sank in the Baltic Sea off Pillau due to an accident. Raised on 12 May, repaired and re-entered service on 15 August.
Wörth	Germany	World War II: The cargo ship was torpedoed and damaged near Flekkefjord by HMS Terrapin (Royal Navy). She saw no further service for the duration of the war.

== 25 March ==
List of shipwrecks: 25 March 1944
Ship	State	Description
CH-54	Imperial Japanese Navy	World War II: Higashi-Matsu Convoy no. 3: The No.28-class submarine chaser was torpedoed and sunk in the Pacific Ocean 50 nautical miles (93 km) north of Muko Jima (28°34′N 142°14′E) by USS Pollack (United States Navy).
MAS 504	Italian Social Republic Navy	World War II: The MAS 501-class MAS boat was rammed and sunk off Anzio, Lazio by HMS Grenville (Royal Navy). Eight Italian crew were killed, five more Italians and two Germans were captured.
PiLB 376	Kriegsmarine	World War II: The PiLB 40 type landing craft was sunk by an air attack west of Berezan Island. Three crew were killed.
PiLB 507	Kriegsmarine	World War II: The PiLB 41 type landing craft was sunk by Allied fighter-bombers near Ugljan island, Croatia.
PiLB 511	Kriegsmarine	World War II: The PiLB 41 type landing craft was sunk by Allied fighter-bombers near Ugljan island, Croatia.
U-976	Kriegsmarine	World War II: The Type VIIC submarine (1,070 GRT) was sunk in the Bay of Biscay off Saint-Nazaire, Loire Atlantique, France (46°48′N 2°43′W) by two de Havilland Mosquito aircraft of 248 Squadron, Royal Air Force with the loss of four of her 53 crew.

== 26 March ==
List of shipwrecks: 26 March 1944
Ship	State	Description
HI Gezinia Catherina	Kriegsmarine	The floating torpedo battery was sunk on this date.
HI 02 Jenny Elsa	Kriegsmarine	World War II: The harbor defence boat (164 GRT) was sunk at IJmuiden in an air raid by Martin B-26 Marauder aircraft of the United States Eighth Air Force.
HI 03 Elie Cheneviere	Kriegsmarine	World War II: The harbor defence boat (164 GRT) was sunk at IJmuiden in an air raid by Martin B-26 Marauder aircraft of the United States Eighth Air Force.
HI 07 Adriana II	Kriegsmarine	The naval drifter was lost on this date.
HV 15 Cornelis	Kriegsmarine	World War II: The harbor defence boat (193 GRT) was sunk at IJmuiden in an air raid by Martin B-26 Marauder aircraft of the United States Eighth Air Force.
HMS MTB 352	Royal Navy	The Vosper 70-foot class motor torpedo boat (39/47 t, 1943) was sunk in a collision in the North Sea.
Margareta	Finland	The cargo ship was run into by Ligur (Sweden) between Gedser and Møn, Denmark and sank.
S-93	Kriegsmarine	World War II: The Type 1939/40 Schnellboot was sunk at IJmuiden, North Holland, Netherlands in an air raid by Martin B-26 Marauder aircraft of the United States Eighth Air Force.
S-129	Kriegsmarine	World War II: The Type 1939/40 Schnellboot was sunk at IJmuiden in an air raid by Martin B-26 Marauder aircraft of the United States Eighth Air Force.
Tjisalak	Netherlands	World War II: The cargo ship was torpedoed and sunk in the Indian Ocean west of the Maldive Islands (2°30′S 78°40′E) by I-8 (Imperial Japanese Navy). About 98 survivors were brought aboard where they were massacred by the crew with swords, wrenches and sledgehammers. Some jumped into the water and were machine gunned. Five were taken as prisoners of war. Five others were rescued by James O. Wilder (United States).
USS Tullibee	United States Navy	World War II: The Gato-class submarine (1,525 GRT) was sunk in the Pacific Ocean (9°30′N 134°45′E) by the malfunction of one of her own torpedoes which had been fired at Japanese convoy Nishi-Matsu No. 2/TAPA-06. Only one of her 80 crew survived, rescued by Wakatake (Imperial Japanese Navy).
V 1415 Azimuth	Kriegsmarine	The naval trawler/Vorpostenboot was lost on this date.
V 1416	Kriegsmarine	World War II: The Vorpostenboot was sunk at IJmuiden in an air raid by Martin B-26 Marauder aircraft of the United States Eighth Air Force.

== 27 March ==
List of shipwrecks: 27 March 1944
Ship	State	Description
F 609C2	Kriegsmarine	The MFP-C2 landing craft was sunk on this date.
F 4706	Kriegsmarine	The MZ-A landing craft was sunk on this date.
F 4795	Kriegsmarine	The MZ-B landing craft was sunk on this date.
F 4799	Kriegsmarine	The MZ-B landing craft was sunk on this date.
LAZ 12 Ostsee	Netherlands	World War II: The salvage vessel struck a mine and sank in the North Sea off Wangerooge, Lower Saxony, Germany.
HMS LCI(L)-273	Royal Navy	The landing craft infantry (large) was lost on this date, details unknown.
HMT Maaløy	Royal Navy	World War II: The naval whaler (249 GRT, 1935) was torpedoed and sunk in the Indian Ocean off the coast of Ceylon (5°25′N 77°32′E) by U-510 (Kriegsmarine) with the loss of all 26 crew.
Nichinan Maru	Japan	World War II: The cargo ship was torpedoed and sunk in the Pacific Ocean north of Bali, Netherlands East Indies by USS Rasher (United States Navy).
USS PT-121	United States Navy	World War II: The ELCO 80'-class PT boat was bombed and sunk in Bangula Bay, New Britain Island (05°17′S 151°01′E) by Consolidated PBY Catalina aircraft of the Royal Australian Air Force.
USS PT-353	United States Navy	World War II: The ELCO 80'-class PT boat was bombed and sunk in Bangula Bay, New Britain Island (05°17′S 151°01′E) by Consolidated PBY Catalina aircraft of the Royal Australian Air Force.
R 188	Kriegsmarine	World War II: The Type R-151 minesweeper was bombed and sunk at Šibenik, Yugoslavia by United States Army Air Force aircraft.
R 191	Kriegsmarine	World War II: The Type R-151 minesweeper was bombed and damaged beyond repair at Šibenik by Allied aircraft. She was scuttled two days later.
SF 272	Kriegsmarine	World War II: The Siebel ferry was sunk by fighters bombers in Vosica Bay, Hvar, Croatia.
SS 3	Imperial Japanese Navy	World War II: The SS 1-class landing ship was sunk by a submarine off New Guinea.
Shinsei Maru	Japan	World War II: The cargo ship was sunk in the Banda Strait by Consolidated PBY Catalina aircraft of the Royal Australian Air Force.
Sperrbrecher 3	Kriegsmarine	World War II: The Sperrbrecher struck a mine and was severely damaged in the Bay of Biscay off La Pallice, Charente-Maritime, France.
Sperrbrecher 175	Kriegsmarine	World War II: The Sperrbrecher struck a mine and was severely damaged in the Bay of Biscay off La Pallice.
Tulagi	United Kingdom	World War II: The cargo ship (2,281 GRT, 1939) was torpedoed and sunk in the Indian Ocean north east of Cape Comorin, India (11°00′S 78°40′E) by U-532 (Kriegsmarine) with the loss of 47 of her 54 crew.
UJ 205	Kriegsmarine	World War II: The submarine chaser, a former Gabbiano-class corvette, was bombed and sunk at Šibenik by United States Army Air Force aircraft.
Yamamizu Maru	Japan	World War II: The tanker was torpedoed and sunk in the Pacific Ocean off Borneo by USS Hake (United States Navy).

== 28 March ==
List of shipwrecks: 28 March 1944
Ship	State	Description
Axios	Greece	The cargo steamer ran ashore off Sandheads, Hooghly River, India and was declared a constructive total loss. There were no casualties.
DB-21	Soviet Navy	The No. 1-class landing boat was sunk by a storm in the Black Sea.
Fukusei Maru	Japan	World War II: The cargo ship was torpedoed and sunk off Okidaitōjima in the Pacific Ocean by USS Barb (United States Navy). 35 crew members were killed.
KATShch-162	Soviet Navy	The auxiliary minesweeping boat was sunk by a storm in the Kerch Straits.
M 4011 Le Pluviose	Kriegsmarine	World War II: The naval trawler/minesweeper was sunk by a mine off Saint-Malo, France.
HMS Syrtis	Royal Navy	World War II: The S-class submarine (842/990 t, 1943) struck a mine and sank in the Norwegian Sea off Bodø, Norway with the loss of all 48 crew.
MT 3 Vienna	Kriegsmarine	World War II: The coastal tanker was torpedoed and sunk in the Aegean Sea off Monemviasa, Greece by HMS Sportsman (Royal Navy). There were six wounded and one missing.
SS 3	Imperial Japanese Navy	World War II: The SS-class landing ship was torpedoed and sunk off Manokawani, New Guinea by USS Silversides (United States Navy).
UJ 117 Rila	Kriegsmarine	The auxiliary submarine chaser was lost on this date.
Yasushima Maru	Japan	World War II: The cargo ship was torpedoed and sunk in the Indian Ocean by HMS Truculent (Royal Navy). 20 crew members and 18 gunners were killed.

== 29 March ==
List of shipwrecks: 29 March 1944
Ship	State	Description
Christel Vinnen	Germany	World War II: The cargo ship was torpedoed and sunk by British aircraft off Juist, Germany.
F 479C2	Kriegsmarine	The MFP-C2 landing craft was sunk on this date.
F 505C	Kriegsmarine	The MFP-C landing craft was sunk on this date.
I-O-08	Kriegsmarine	The Siebelgefäß landing craft was sunk on this date.
KF 456	Kriegsmarine	World War II: The MFP-C Type Artilleriefährprahm was sunk during an Allied air raid on Livorno.
M 4000 IJmuiden	Kriegsmarine	World War II: The naval trawler/auxiliary minesweeper struck a mine and sank in the English Channel off Saint-Malo, Ille-et-Vilaine, France.
M 4600 Maria Van Hattem	Kriegsmarine	The naval trawler/minesweeper was sunk on this date.
Richard Hovey	United States	World War II: The Liberty ship was torpedoed, shelled and sunk in the Indian Ocean (16°40′N 64°30′E) by I-26 (Imperial Japanese Navy). Her master and three crewmen were taken as prisoners of war. I-26 machine gunned the survivors, killing four of them. Samcalia (United Kingdom) rescued 25 on 2 April, and 38 survivors are rescued by Samuta (United Kingdom) on 14 April.
SF 271	Kriegsmarine	World War II: The Siebel ferry was sunk in the Aegean Sea by Allied aircraft.
U-961	Kriegsmarine	World War II: The Type VIIC submarine was depth charged and sunk in the Atlantic Ocean 150 nautical miles (280 km) north of the Faroe Islands (64°31′N 3°19′W) by HMS Starling Royal Navy) with the loss of all 49 crew.
Vitrik	United States	The schooner barge capsized and sank in bad weather off Key Largo at (24°26′N 80°18′W). Wreck located in March, 2000.

== 30 March ==
List of shipwrecks: 30 March 1944
Ship	State	Description
Akashi	Imperial Japanese Navy	World War II: Operation Desecrate One: The Akashi-class repair ship was sunk in the Pacific Ocean off the north shore of Urukthapel Island, Palau (07°30′N 134°30′E) by United States Navy aircraft from Task Force 58. She sank in shallow water and was only partially submerged. Scrapped in 1954.
Akebono Maru	Imperial Japanese Navy	World War II: Operation Desecrate One: Convoy PATA-07: The tanker was bombed and sunk in the Pacific Ocean off Palau (7°30′N 134°30′E) by United States Navy aircraft from Task Force 58. Five crewmen were killed.
Amatsu Maru	Imperial Japanese Navy	World War II: Operation Desecrate One: The oiler was bombed and sunk in Malakai Harbor, Babelthuap Island, Palau in the Pacific Ocean by United States Navy aircraft from Task Force 58. Ten crewmen were killed.
Asashio Maru	Imperial Japanese Navy	World War II: Operation Desecrate One: The oiler was bombed, torpedoed and sunk in Kobasang Harbor, Palau (07°25′N 134°25′E) by United States Navy aircraft from Task Force 58. Eighteen crewmen were killed.
Atlantic Maru	Japan	World War II: The cargo ship (5,872 GRT) was torpedoed and sunk in the Pacific Ocean south west of Guam (12°15′N 145°42′E) by USS Picuda (United States Navy). Two crew, one gunner and 27 passengers were killed.
CH-6	Imperial Japanese Navy	World War II: Operation Desecrate One: The No.4-class submarine chaser was bombed and sunk off Palau by United States Navy aircraft from Task Force 58 (07°30′N 134°30′E).
City of Adelaide	United Kingdom	World War II: The cargo ship (6,589 GRT, 1920) was torpedoed, shelled and sunk in the Indian Ocean (12°01′S 80°27′E) by I-8 (Imperial Japanese Navy). Her 90 crew were rescued by Carole Lombard (United States).
Erfurt	Germany	World War II: The cargo ship struck a mine and sank in the Baltic Sea off Fehmarn, Germany. There were no casualties. She was refloated, repaired and returned to service.
Fujikawa Maru	Imperial Japanese Army	World War II: The Type 1C Wartime Standard cargo ship was torpedoed and sunk in the Pacific Ocean north west of Manokwari, New Guinea (01°50′N 133°25′E) by USS Darter (United States Navy) with the loss of 12 people.
Goshū Maru	Imperial Japanese Navy	World War II: Operation Desecrate One: Convoy PATA-07: The Goshū Maru-class auxiliary transport was bombed and sunk in the Pacific Ocean off Palau (7°20′N 134°30′E) by United States Navy aircraft from Task Force 58. Forty-five crewmen were killed.
Gozan Maru	Imperial Japanese Army	World War II: Operation Desecrate One: The Shinryu Maru-class auxiliary transport was bombed and damaged by aircraft from USS Enterprise and USS Bunker Hill (both United States Navy) off Urukhapel Island, Malakai Harbor, Palau. On 31 March she was bombed and damaged by aircraft from USS Yorktown (United States Navy), and finally sunk by Douglas SBD Dauntless and Grumman TBF Avenger aircraft from USS Lexington (United States Navy).
Hokutai Maru	Imperial Japanese Army	World War II: Operation Desecrate One: Convoy PATA-07: The cargo ship was sunk in the Pacific Ocean off Palau (7°30′N 134°30′E) by United States Navy aircraft from Task Force 58. Three crewmen were killed.
I-O-85	Kriegsmarine	World War II: The Siebelgefäß landing craft was sunk by Allied fighter-bomber aircraft at Bol, Brac Island, Croatia.
Ibaraki Maru	Imperial Japanese Navy	World War II: Operation Desecrate One: The auxiliary guard ship was off Palau in the Pacific Ocean by United States Navy aircraft from Task Force 58.
Ikushima Maru	Imperial Japanese Navy	World War II: Convoy No. 4328: The Kasuga Maru-class transport was torpedoed and sunk in the Pacific Ocean 350 miles (560 km) north north west of Saipan, Mariana Islands (20°09′N 109°42′E) by USS Stingray (United States Navy). Fifteen troops and eleven crewmen were killed. Survivors were rescued by W-20 (Imperial Japanese Navy).
Kamikaze Maru	Imperial Japanese Navy	World War II: Operation Desecrate One: The Kamikaze Maru-class auxiliary food transport was bombed, attacked with rockets and sunk in 115 feet (35 m) of water in Malakal Harbor, Urukhapel Island, Palau (07°30′N 134°30′E) by United States Navy aircraft from Task Force 58. 69 crew were killed.
Kibi Maru	Imperial Japanese Army	World War II: Operation Desecrate One: Convoy PATA-07: The cargo ship was sunk off Palau by United States Navy aircraft from Task Force 58. Five crewmen were killed.
Krom	Turkey	World War II: The cargo ship was sunk, probably by a mine, north of Rhodes.
HMS Laforey	Royal Navy	World War II: The L-class destroyer (1,935/2,675 t, 1941) was torpedoed and sunk in the Mediterranean Sea north of Palermo, Sicily, Italy (38°54′N 14°18′E) by U-223 (Kriegsmarine) with the loss of 182 of her 247 crew. Survivors were rescued by HMS Blencathra, HMS Hambledon and HMS Tumult (all Royal Navy).
Nagisan Maru	Imperial Japanese Navy	World War II: Operation Desecrate One: The Nagisan Maru-class auxiliary transport was bombed and sunk off Palau (07°17′N 134°25′E) by United States Navy aircraft from Task Force 58. Two crewmen were killed.
Nasami	Imperial Japanese Navy	World War II: The Natsushima-class minelayer was bombed and damaged off Rabaul, New Guinea. The damage caused her to be beached 1 April 1944 at Karavia Bay, Rabaul. The hulk was scrapped in situ in 1969.
Ose	Japan	World War II: The cargo ship was sunkin the Pacific Ocean (7°30′N 134°30′E) by United States Navy carrier-based aircraft.
PB-31	Imperial Japanese Navy	World War II: Operation Desecrate One: Convoy PATA-07: The PB-31-class patrol boat was torpedoed and sunk 20 nautical miles (37 km) in Karamadoo Bay, west of Babelthaup Island, Palau in the Pacific Ocean (07°30′N 134°30′E) by United States Navy aircraft from Task Force 58.
R 161	Kriegsmarine	World War II: The minesweeper was sunk in an Allied air raid on Livorno, Italy.
RA 256	Kriegsmarine	World War II: The VAS 301-class submarine chaser was bombed and damaged beyond repair at Livorno, Italy by Allied aircraft.
Raizan Maru	Imperial Japanese Navy	World War II: Operation Desecrate One: Convoy PATA-07: The cargo ship was sunk off Palau by United States Navy aircraft from Task Force 58. Four crew were killed.
Ryuko Maru	Imperial Japanese Navy	World War II: Operation Desecrate One: Convoy PATA-07: The Peacetime Standard Type C auxiliary transport ship (2,764 GRT 1942) was sunk at or near Palau by United States Navy aircraft from Task Force 58. Five crewmen were killed.
Sata Maru	Imperial Japanese Navy	World War II: Operation Desecrate One: The oiler was bombed and torpedoed by United States Navy aircraft from Task Force 58 on 30 March. She capsized and sank at Kuror, Peleliu, Palau (07°25′N 134°25′E). Eighteen crewmen were killed.
Shinsei Maru No. 18	Imperial Japanese Navy	World War II: Operation Desecrate One: The Mikage Maru No. 20-class auxiliary transport was bombed and sunk in Palau harbor by United States Navy aircraft from Task Force 58. Seven crewmen were killed.
Shosei Maru	Imperial Japanese Navy	World War II: Operation Desecrate One: The Shosei Maru-class auxiliary transport (771 GRT 1914) was strafed by Grumman F6F Hellcat aircraft east of Urukthapel Island. The vessel was beached later in the day on Korak Island. The ship was bombed and set afire the next day, developing a list. Shosei Maru sank on 5 May 1944.
Teshio Maru	Imperial Japanese Army	World War II: Operation Desecrate One: Convoy PATA-07: The cargo ship was sunk off Palau by United States Navy aircraft from Task Force 58. Three crewmen were killed.
U-223	Kriegsmarine	World War II: The Type VIIC submarine was depth charged and sunk in the Mediterranean Sea (38°48′N 14°10′E) by HMS Blencathra, HMS Hambledon, HMS Laforey and HMS Tumult (all Royal Navy) with the loss of 23 of her 50 crew.
UJ 206	Kriegsmarine	World War II: The incomplete Gabbiano-class corvette was destroyed in an air raid on Venice, Italy.
UJ 207	Kriegsmarine	World War II: The incomplete Gabbiano-class corvette was destroyed in an air raid on Venice, Italy.
Urakami Maru	Imperial Japanese Navy	World War II: Operation Desecrate One: The Urakami Maru-class repair ship was bombed, torpedoed and sunk in Malakal Harbor, Palau (07°30′N 134°30′E) by United States Navy aircraft from Task Force 58. Scrapped post War.
Wakatake	Imperial Japanese Navy	World War II: Operation Desecrate One: Convoy PATA-07: The Wakatake-class destroyer (900 GRT) was torpedoed and sunk 20 nautical miles (37 km) in Karamadoo Bay, west of Babelthaup, Palau (07°30′N 134°30′E) by United States Navy aircraft from Task Force 58. Casualties are unknown but her commanding officer was killed.

== 31 March ==
List of shipwrecks: 31 March 1944
Ship	State	Description
Grauer Ort	Germany	World War II: The sailing vessel was sunk in the Mediterranean Sea off Cape Maleas, Greece by HMS Sportsman (Royal Navy). Eight of her crew were taken as prisoners of war.
I-O-42	Kriegsmarine	World War II: The Siebelgefäß landing craft was sunk by fighter-bomber aircraft off Brac Island in the Adriatic Sea.
Iro	Imperial Japanese Navy	World War II: Operation Desecrate One: The tanker was bombed and set on fire in a lagoon at Koror, Peleliu by United States Navy aircraft from Task Force 58. She burned until she sank on 17 April. Fifty soldiers on board were killed.
HMS MTB 241	Royal Navy	World War II: The Vosper 72 foot-class motor torpedo boat (39/47 t, 1942) was sunk off IJmuiden, Netherlands by Kriegsmarine surface ships. The whole crew was rescued, only one was wounded.
Nissho Maru No. 5	Imperial Japanese Navy	World War II: The Nissho Maru No. 5-class auxiliary transport ship was bombed and sunk on the northeast side of Ngargol Island, Palau, Caroline Islands, by carrier aircraft from Task Force 58.
Patrol Boat No. 31	Imperial Japanese Navy	World War II: The patrol vessel, formerly the Momi-class destroyer Kiku, was sunk by U.S. Navy aircraft near Palau in the Caroline Islands at 07°30′N 134°30′E.
PiLB 413	Kriegsmarine	The PiLB 40 type landing craft sank near Karolina-Bugaz, Ukraine. She was later raised and repaired.
PiLB 508	Kriegsmarine	World War II: The PiLB 41 type landing craft was sunk by Allied fighter-bomber aircraft at Trogir, Croatia.
PiLB 514	Kriegsmarine	World War II: The PiLB 41 type landing craft was sunk by Allied fighter-bomber aircraft at Sumartin, Croatia.
PiLB 515	Kriegsmarine	World War II: The PiLB 41 type landing craft was sunk by Allied fighter-bomber aircraft at Sumartin, Croatia.
PiLB 516	Kriegsmarine	World War II: The PiLB 41 type landing craft was sunk by Allied fighter-bomber aircraft at Sumartin, Croatia.
Shoei Maru 2 Go	Imperial Japanese Navy	World War II: Operation Desecrate One: The Peacetime Standard Type D transport was sunk in shallow water partially above water off Malakal Island, Palau by United States Navy aircraft from Task Force 58. Three crewmen were killed. Scrapped in place post war.
Sperrbrecher 141 Lies	Kriegsmarine	World War II: The Sperrbrecher struck a mine and sank off Ostend, Belgium.

== Unknown date ==
List of shipwrecks: Unknown date 1944
Ship	State	Description
Cesteriano	Panama	World War II: The tanker was sunk in an Allied air raid on Toulon, Var, France. She was refloated in May 1946, but sank again. She was refloated in 1948 and scrapped in 1949.
CHa-26	Imperial Japanese Navy	World War II: Operation Desecrate One: The auxiliary submarine chaser was sunk in the Pacific Ocean at or near Palau by United States Navy aircraft from Task Force 58 on 30 or 31 March.
I-O-115	Kriegsmarine	The Siebelgefäß landing craft was sunk sometime in March.
Kosuku Maru No. 3	Imperial Japanese Navy	World War II: Convoy MOMA-07: The Kosuku Maru No. 3-class auxiliary storeship was bombed and sunk at Uranama (unidentified location, probably in New Britain/Solomons area) in mid-March.
HMS LCA 1496	Royal Navy	The landing craft assault reported lost in April.
HMS LCM 76	Royal Navy	The landing craft mechanized (21/35 t, 1941) was lost sometime in March.
MAS 541	Regia Marina	World War II: The MAS 526-class MAS boat was lost on 21 or 22 March between Corsica and Genoa, Italy, possibly by a mine.
HMS Stonehenge	Royal Navy	World War II: The S-class submarine (842/990 t, 1943) is presumed to have struck a mine and sank in the Indian Ocean on or about 15 March.
U-851	Kriegsmarine	World War II: The Type IXD2 submarine went missing on patrol in the Atlantic Ocean on or after 27 March with the loss of all 70 crew.
USS YTM-467	United States Navy	The harbor tug, medium sank in the Gilbert Islands or Marshall Islands sometime in March.
