= Japanese destroyer Karukaya =

Wakatake-class destroyer

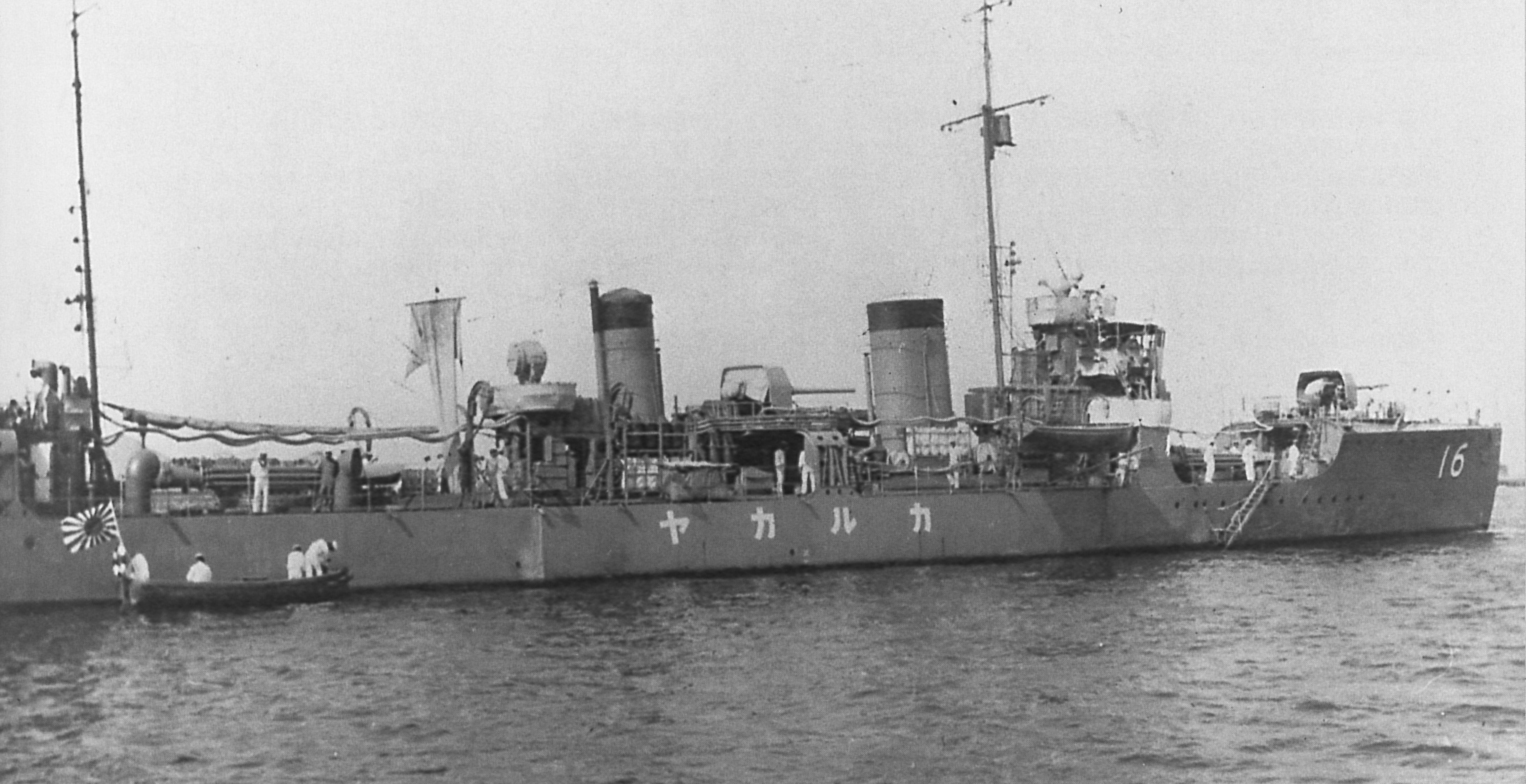

History

Empire of Japan
- Name: Karukaya
- Builder: Fujinagata Shipyard, Osaka
- Laid down: 16 May 1922
- Launched: 19 March 1923
- Commissioned: 20 August 1923
- Fate: Torpedoed and sunk, 10 May 1944

General characteristics
- Type: Wakatake-class destroyer
- Displacement: 900 long tons (914 t) normal; 1,100 long tons (1,118 t) full load
- Length: 83.8 m (274 ft 11 in) p/p; 85.3 m (279 ft 10 in) o/a
- Beam: 7.9 m (25 ft 11 in)
- Draught: 2.5 m (8 ft 2 in)
- Propulsion: 2-shaft Parsons geared steam turbines, 3 boilers, 21,500 shp (16,000 kW)
- Speed: 35.5 knots (65.7 km/h; 40.9 mph)
- Range: 3,000 nmi (5,600 km) at 15 kn (28 km/h; 17 mph)
- Complement: 110
- Armament: 3 × Type 3 120 mm 45 caliber naval guns; 2 × 7.7 mm machine guns; 4 × 53cm torpedoes

The Japanese destroyer Karukaya (刈萱) was a Wakatake-class destroyer of the Imperial Japanese Navy. One of a class of eight 2nd-class destroyers, the ship was built by the Fujinagata Shipyard in Osaka, Japan. She was laid down on 16 May 1922, launched 19 March 1923, and commissioned 20 August 1923 as Dai-18-Go Kuchikukan, the name being changed to Karukaya on 1 August 1928.

== Design ==
The Wakatake-class destroyers were essentially slightly modified Momi-class ships with a deeper draft to improve handling characteristics in heavy seas, particularly against rolling. Weaponry layout, general arrangement and silhouette were all identical with the Momi class.

The small displacement and shallow draft of the Wakatake class limited their use as fleet escorts. As with the Momi class, in the 1920s and 1930s, they were mainly used in Chinese coastal waters.

Karukaya was refitted in the winter of 1941–1942, with one of its 120 mm guns being replaced by six 25 mm Type 96 anti-aircraft cannon in two triple mounts, together with several 13.2 mm (0.52 in) machine guns. The destroyer's minelaying and sweeping gear was removed to allow four depth charge throwers and up to 48 depth charges to be fitted.

== World War II ==
Karukaya was assigned to the 32nd Destroyer Division on the outbreak of the war in the Pacific, and spent the early months of the war protecting shipping traffic in the Tsushima Straits.

On 10 April 1942, the 1st Surface Escort Division of the Southwest Area Fleet was created, and Destroyer Division 32, including Karukaya was assigned to it to provide protection for convoys against Allied submarine activity. They initially escorted convoys running between Moji in Japan, Taiwan and the Philippines, but later added routes to Singapore, French Indochina, the Netherlands East Indies, and Palau. In the course of this service Karukaya set a record by successfully completing 54 convoy escorts before her loss.

== Loss ==
Karukaya was torpedoed and sunk by the submarine USS Cod in the South China Sea west of Luzon on 10 May 1944, at 15°47′N 119°32′E.
