= HMS Syrtis =

WWII submarine of the Royal Navy

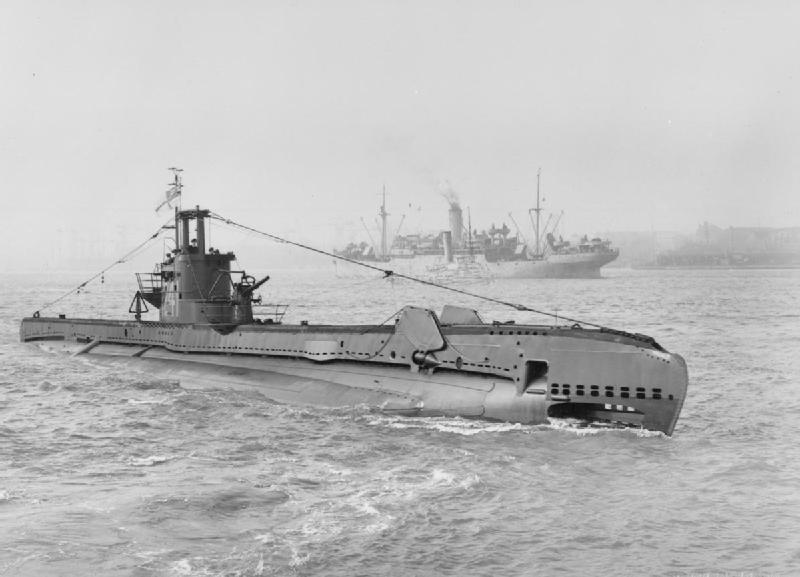
- Syrtis in April 1943

History

United Kingdom
- Name: Syrtis
- Namesake: Syrtis Major Planum
- Ordered: 25 January 1941
- Builder: Cammell Laird, Birkenhead
- Laid down: 14 October 1941
- Launched: 4 February 1943
- Commissioned: 23 April 1943
- Identification: Pennant number: P241
- Fate: Sunk, March 1944
- Badge

General characteristics
- Class & type: S-class submarine
- Displacement: 865 long tons (879 t) (surfaced); 990 long tons (1,010 t) (submerged)
- Length: 217 ft (66.1 m)
- Beam: 23 ft 9 in (7.2 m)
- Draught: 14 ft 8 in (4.5 m)
- Installed power: 1,900 bhp (1,400 kW) (diesel); 1,300 hp (970 kW) (electric)
- Propulsion: 2 × diesel engines; 2 × electric motors
- Speed: 15 kn (28 km/h; 17 mph) (surfaced); 10 kn (19 km/h; 12 mph) (submerged)
- Range: 6,000 nmi (11,000 km; 6,900 mi) at 10 knots (19 km/h; 12 mph) (surfaced); 120 nmi (220 km; 140 mi) at 3 knots (5.6 km/h; 3.5 mph) (submerged)
- Test depth: 300 ft (91.4 m)
- Complement: 48
- Sensors & processing systems: Type 129AR or 138 ASDIC; Type 291 early-warning radar
- Armament: 7 × 21 in (533 mm) torpedo tubes (6 × bow, 1 × stern); 1 × 3 in (76 mm) deck gun; 1 × 20 mm (0.8 in) AA gun

HMS Syrtis was a third-batch S-class submarine built for the Royal Navy during the Second World War. Completed in 1943, Syrtis spent most of her career in the Arctic, off Norway, other than a single patrol in the Bay of Biscay,

On her first patrol, she sighted a German submarine, but could not attack it. Her second patrol saw the submarine board a Vichy French fishing vessel. Syrtis was then assigned to take part in Operation Source, an attack on the German battleships based in Norway, using midget submarines. The boat was to tow the submarine X9 to her target, then release it to perform its mission. However, the tow line between the two submarines parted en route, and X9 was lost with all hands.

Syrtis went on to conduct three patrols off Norway, but these were uneventful. On 16 March, the submarine started another patrol in the Arctic, and sank one Norwegian merchant ship. She never returned, and was most probably sunk by mines.

== Design and description ==
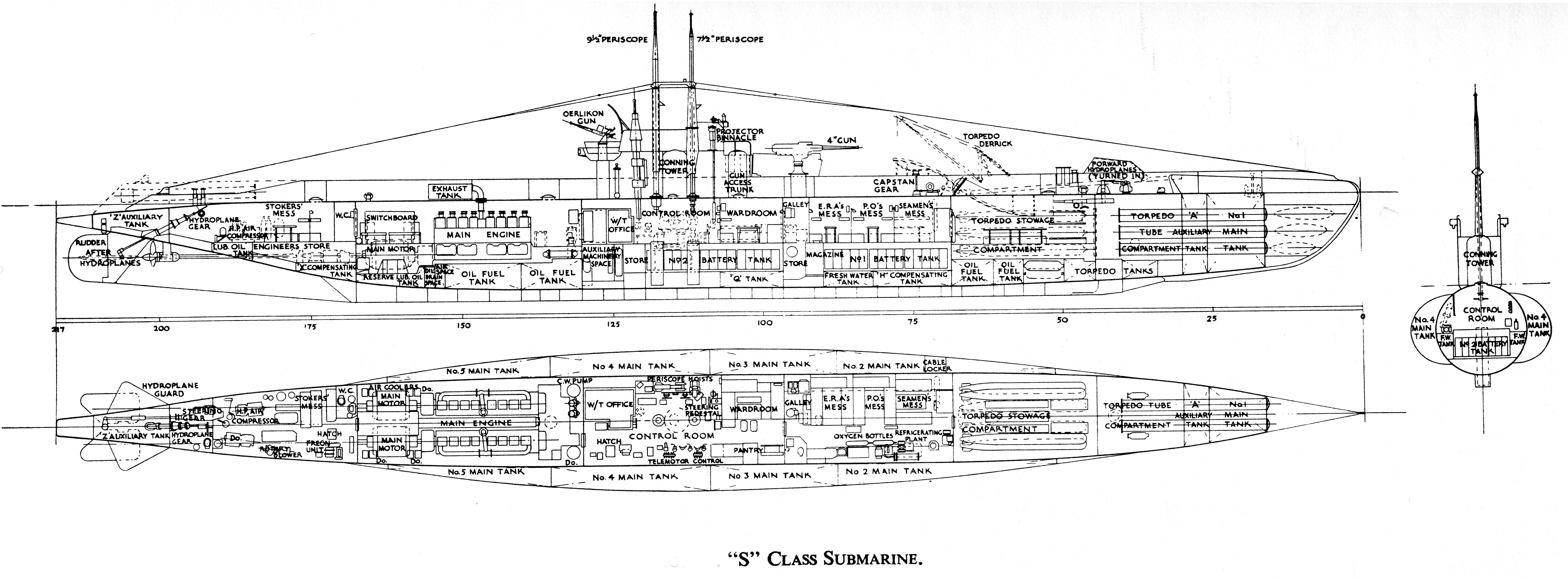
Schematic drawing of a S-class submarine

The S-class submarines were designed to patrol the restricted waters of the North Sea and the Mediterranean Sea. The third batch was slightly enlarged and improved over the preceding second batch of the S class. The submarines had a length of 217 feet (66.1 m) overall, a beam of 23 feet 9 inches (7.2 m) and a draught of 14 feet 8 inches (4.5 m). They displaced 865 long tons (879 t) on the surface and 990 long tons (1,010 t) submerged. The S-class submarines had a crew of 48 officers and ratings. They had a diving depth of 300 feet (91 m).

For surface running, the boats were powered by two 950-brake-horsepower (708 kW) diesel engines, each driving one propeller shaft. When submerged each propeller was driven by a 650-horsepower (485 kW) electric motor. They could reach 15 knots (28 km/h; 17 mph) on the surface and 10 knots (19 km/h; 12 mph) underwater. On the surface, the third-batch boats had a range of 6,000 nautical miles (11,000 km; 6,900 mi) at 10 knots (19 km/h; 12 mph) and 120 nmi (220 km; 140 mi) at 3 knots (5.6 km/h; 3.5 mph) submerged.

The boats were armed with seven 21-inch (533 mm) torpedo tubes. Six of these were in the bow, and one external tube was mounted in the stern. They carried six reload torpedoes for the bow tubes for a total of thirteen torpedoes. Twelve mines could be carried in lieu of the internally stowed torpedoes. They were also armed with a 3-inch (76 mm) deck gun. It is uncertain if Syrtis was completed with a 20-millimetre (0.8 in) Oerlikon light AA gun or had one added later. The third-batch S-class boats were fitted with either a Type 129AR or 138 ASDIC system and a Type 291 or 291W early-warning radar.

== Construction and career ==
HMS Syrtis was a third-batch S-class submarine ordered by the British Admiralty on 25 January 1941. She was laid down in the Cammell Laird shipyard in Birkenhead on 14 October 1941 and was launched on 4 February 1943. On 21 April Syrtis, under the command of Lieutenant Michael Hugh Jupp, sailed to Holy Loch, where she was commissioned into the Royal Navy two days later. The submarine was named after Syrtis Major Planum region of Mars; thus far, she has been the only ship to bear the name "Syrtis".

After training off several British coastal cities, Syrtis commenced an anti-submarine patrol off Norway on 6 July 1943. The next day, she spotted a submarine, probably the German submarine U-269, but could not maneuver into an attack position. The boat did not sight any more ships and returned from patrol on 20 July.

The submarine next departed port on 3 August, patrolling the Bay of Biscay on another anti-submarine patrol. The patrol was mostly uneventful, except for 17 August, when Syrtis's crew boarded a Vichy French fishing vessel and sent its crew off, intending to use the ship for reconnaissance; however, the idea was abandoned for lack of wind and the men left the ship. The submarine then ended her patrol three days later in Holy Loch.

=== Operation Source ===
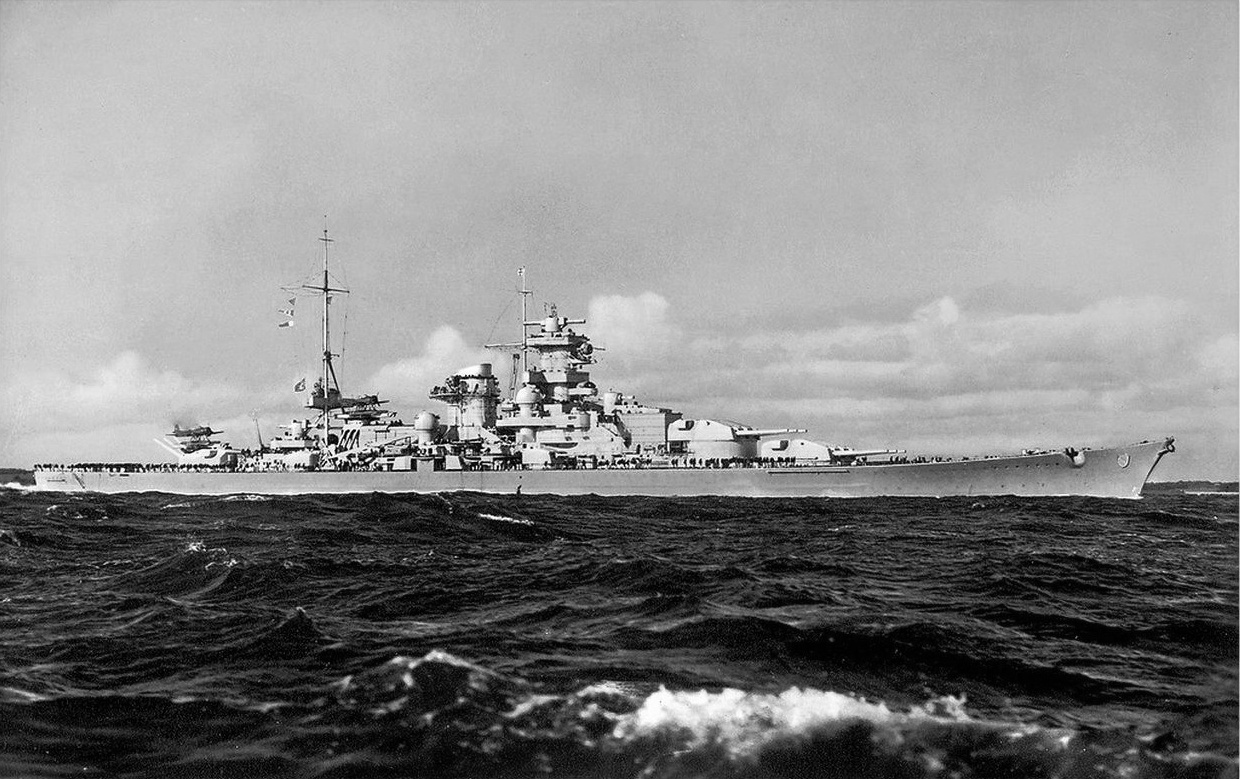
Scharnhorst at sea

On 1 September, Syrtis conducted training at Port HHZ with X-class midget submarines in preparation for Operation Source, an attack on the German battleships in Norway using midget submarines. On 11 September 1943, the boat departed port towing the X-class submarine X9 close to her target, the battleship Scharnhorst. An auxiliary crew was on board during the passage, which was meant to switch with the operational crew near the target. X9, probably trimmed heavily by the bow in the heavy sea for the tow, was lost with all hands during the voyage when her tow parted and she abruptly plunged down during the early morning of 16 September. This was not discovered on board Syrtis until 09:00, when she reversed course and started a search for the lost craft; it was never found. The submarine then returned to Holy Loch on 5 October without having attacked any ships.

=== Subsequent operations ===
From 25 October to 12 November, Syrtis conducted a patrol off Norway but did not sight any potential targets. After conducting additional training, the submarine conducted an anti-submarine patrol off Norway on 22 December, protecting the Arctic convoys JW 55B, RA 55A and RA 55B. The patrol was uneventful, and the boat returned to Lerwick, Scotland, on 6 January.

On 2 February 1944, Syrtis departed Kames Bay with the X-class midget submarine X22 in tow. Five days later, while nearing Scapa Flow, Syrtis's watch officer was washed overboard; the submarine turned to pick him up, but collided with X22, which went down with all hands. The watch officer was not found.

Syrtis next patrolled off the Stad peninsula from 12 to 22 February; the submarine's only action during the patrol was an unsuccessful attack on the Norwegian merchant ship Sirius.

On 16 March, Syrtis departed Lerwick for her seventh patrol, off the Kya Lighthouse then later off Bodø. She achieved the only success of her career on 22 March, sinking the Norwegian merchant Narvik with gunfire off Rødøya. Syrtis was never seen again; on 28 March, she was ordered to return to Lerwick, but did not acknowledge the order. German reports indicate the sinking of a submarine in the Bodø area at the time by shore batteries, but the most likely cause of her loss is a mine.

== Summary of raiding history ==
During her service with the Royal Navy, Syrtis sank one ship for a total of 241 GRT.

| Date | Name of ship | Tonnage | Nationality | Fate and location |
|---|---|---|---|---|
| 22 March 1944 | Narvik | 209 | Norway | Sunk with gunfire at 66°45′N 13°11′E |
