= German submarine U-802 =

German World War II submarine

History

Nazi Germany
- Name: U-802
- Ordered: 7 December 1940
- Builder: DeSchiMAG Seebeckwerft, Bremerhaven
- Yard number: 360
- Laid down: 1 December 1941
- Launched: 31 October 1942
- Commissioned: 12 June 1943
- Fate: Surrendered on 11 May 1945; sunk as part of Operation Deadlight on 31 December 1945

General characteristics
- Class & type: Type IXC/40 submarine
- Displacement: 1,144 t (1,126 long tons) surfaced; 1,257 t (1,237 long tons) submerged
- Length: 76.76 m (251 ft 10 in) o/a; 58.75 m (192 ft 9 in) pressure hull
- Beam: 6.86 m (22 ft 6 in) o/a; 4.44 m (14 ft 7 in) pressure hull
- Height: 9.60 m (31 ft 6 in)
- Draught: 4.67 m (15 ft 4 in)
- Installed power: 4,400 PS (3,200 kW; 4,300 bhp) (diesels); 1,000 PS (740 kW; 990 shp) (electric)
- Propulsion: 2 shafts; 2 × diesel engines; 2 × electric motors
- Speed: 19 knots (35 km/h; 22 mph) surfaced; 7.3 knots (13.5 km/h; 8.4 mph) submerged
- Range: 13,850 nmi (25,650 km; 15,940 mi) at 10 knots (19 km/h; 12 mph) surfaced; 63 nmi (117 km; 72 mi) at 4 knots (7.4 km/h; 4.6 mph) submerged
- Test depth: 230 m (750 ft)
- Complement: 4 officers, 44 enlisted
- Armament: 6 × torpedo tubes (4 bow, 2 stern); 22 × 53.3 cm (21 in) torpedoes; 1 × 10.5 cm (4.1 in) SK C/32 deck gun (180 rounds); 1 × 3.7 cm (1.5 in) SK C/30 AA gun; 1 × twin 2 cm FlaK 30 AA guns

Service record
- Part of: 4th U-boat Flotilla; 16 May 1943 – 31 January 1944; 2nd U-boat Flotilla; 1 February – 30 November 1944; 33rd U-boat Flotilla; 1 December 1944 – 8 May 1945
- Identification codes: M 52 697
- Commanders: Kptlt. Rolf Steinhaus; 12 June – 12 December 1943; Kptlt. Helmut Schmoeckel; 13 December 1943 – 11 May 1945
- Operations: 4 patrols: 1st patrol: 29 January – 2 May 1944; 2nd patrol: 22 June – 9 July 1944; 3rd patrol: a. 16 July – 12 November 1944; b. 13 – 20 November 1944; c. 21 – 23 November 1944; d. 8 – 12 April 1945; e. 22 – 23 April 1945; 4th patrol: 28 April – 11 May 1945
- Victories: 1 merchant ship sunk (1,621 GRT)

German submarine U-802 was a Type IXC/40 U-boat built for Nazi Germany's Kriegsmarine during World War II.

== Design ==
German Type IXC/40 submarines were slightly larger than the original Type IXCs. U-802 had a displacement of 1,144 tonnes (1,126 long tons) when at the surface and 1,257 tonnes (1,237 long tons) while submerged. The U-boat had a total length of 76.76 m (251 ft 10 in), a pressure hull length of 58.75 m (192 ft 9 in), a beam of 6.86 m (22 ft 6 in), a height of 9.60 m (31 ft 6 in), and a draught of 4.67 m (15 ft 4 in). The submarine was powered by two MAN M 9 V 40/46 supercharged four-stroke, nine-cylinder diesel engines producing a total of 4,400 metric horsepower (3,240 kW; 4,340 shp) for use while surfaced, two Siemens-Schuckert 2 GU 345/34 double-acting electric motors producing a total of 1,000 shaft horsepower (1,010 PS; 750 kW) for use while submerged. She had two shafts and two 1.92 m (6 ft) propellers. The boat was capable of operating at depths of up to 230 metres (750 ft).

The submarine had a maximum surface speed of 18.3 knots (33.9 km/h; 21.1 mph) and a maximum submerged speed of 7.3 knots (13.5 km/h; 8.4 mph). When submerged, the boat could operate for 63 nautical miles (117 km; 72 mi) at 4 knots (7.4 km/h; 4.6 mph); when surfaced, she could travel 13,850 nautical miles (25,650 km; 15,940 mi) at 10 knots (19 km/h; 12 mph). U-802 was fitted with six 53.3 cm (21 in) torpedo tubes (four fitted at the bow and two at the stern), 22 torpedoes, one 10.5 cm (4.13 in) SK C/32 naval gun, 180 rounds, and a 3.7 cm (1.5 in) SK C/30 as well as a 2 cm (0.79 in) C/30 anti-aircraft gun. The boat had a complement of forty-eight.

== Service history ==
Laid down on 1 December 1941, U-802 was launched eleven months later on 31 October 1942. On 12 June 1943 the U-boat was commissioned into service under the command of Kapitänleutnant Rolf Steinhaus (Crew 36).

In September 1943, Kapitänleutnant Helmut Schmoeckel (Crew 36) joined the crew of U-802 as a trainee commander. Schmoeckel finally relieved Steinhaus and took command of U-802 on 12 December 1943. Transferring from 4th U-boat Flotilla to 2nd U-boat Flotilla.

=== First patrol ===
U-802 left base in Kiel on 29 January 1944 and after brief stops in Kristiansand and Stavanger she reached her assigned patrol area in the North Atlantic in mid-February. In late March and early April U-801 attacked several convoys, sinking the Canadian 1621 GRT steamer Watuka and possibly two more steamers from convoy SH 125 in 44°30′N 62°51′W on 22 March 1944. In an attack on convoy HX 286 she claimed two more steamers of 10,000 GRT sunk or damaged respectively. On 2 May 1944 the U-boat arrived in Lorient.

=== Second patrol ===
U-802 set out from Lorient on her second patrol on 22 June 1944, but when her snorkel failed on 1 July, she made for port. After experiencing an air attack earlier that day, U-802 arrived back in Lorient on 9 July 1944.

=== Third patrol ===
On 16 July the U-boat left again for operations in the West and North Atlantic. In mid-August U-802 made contact with an aircraft carrier but did not attack, but claimed an escort, HMCS Stettler, sunk on 14 September 1944. However, this was proved incorrect; HMCS Stettler survived the war. On 12 November 1944, she returned to base via Norway to Flensburg.

=== Fourth patrol ===
From Flensburg U-802 left again for the West Atlantic on 11 December 1944 to return to Kiel on 8 April 1945 after 118 days at sea. The last weeks of war in Europe U-802 spent in Norwegian waters.

== Fate ==
Leaving Bergen on 3 May, U-802 arrived in Loch Eriboll on 11 May 1945 in order to surrender to the British. The U-boat was transferred to Loch Alsh the next day, and to Lisahally the day after that, where she remained until the end of the year. On 30 December 1945 U-802 left Moville under tow from HMS Pytchley. At 12:30h the next day, 31 December 1945, the cable broke and U-802 sank at 55°30′N 8°25′W.

== Summary of raiding history ==
Date	Ship Name	Nationality	Tonnage (GRT)	Fate
22 March 1944	Watuka	Canada	1,621	Sunk

== Bibliography ==
- Busch, Rainer; Röll, Hans-Joachim (1999a). German U-boat commanders of World War II : a biographical dictionary. Translated by Brooks, Geoffrey. London, Annapolis, Md: Greenhill Books, Naval Institute Press. ISBN 1-55750-186-6.
- Busch, Rainer; Röll, Hans-Joachim (1999b). Der U-Boot-Krieg, 1939-1945: Deutsche U-Boot-Verluste von September 1939 bis Mai 1945 [German U-boat losses from September 1939 to May 1945] (in German). Vol. IV. Hamburg, Berlin, Bonn: Mittler. ISBN 3-8132-0514-2.
- Gröner, Eric; Jung, Dieter; Maass, Martin (1991). German Warships 1815-1945: U-boats and Mine Warfare Vessels. Vol. 2. Translated by Thomas, Keith; Magowan, Rachel. London: Conway Maritime Press. ISBN 0-85177-593-4.
