= Japanese repair ship Akashi =

Repair ship of the Imperial Japanese Navy

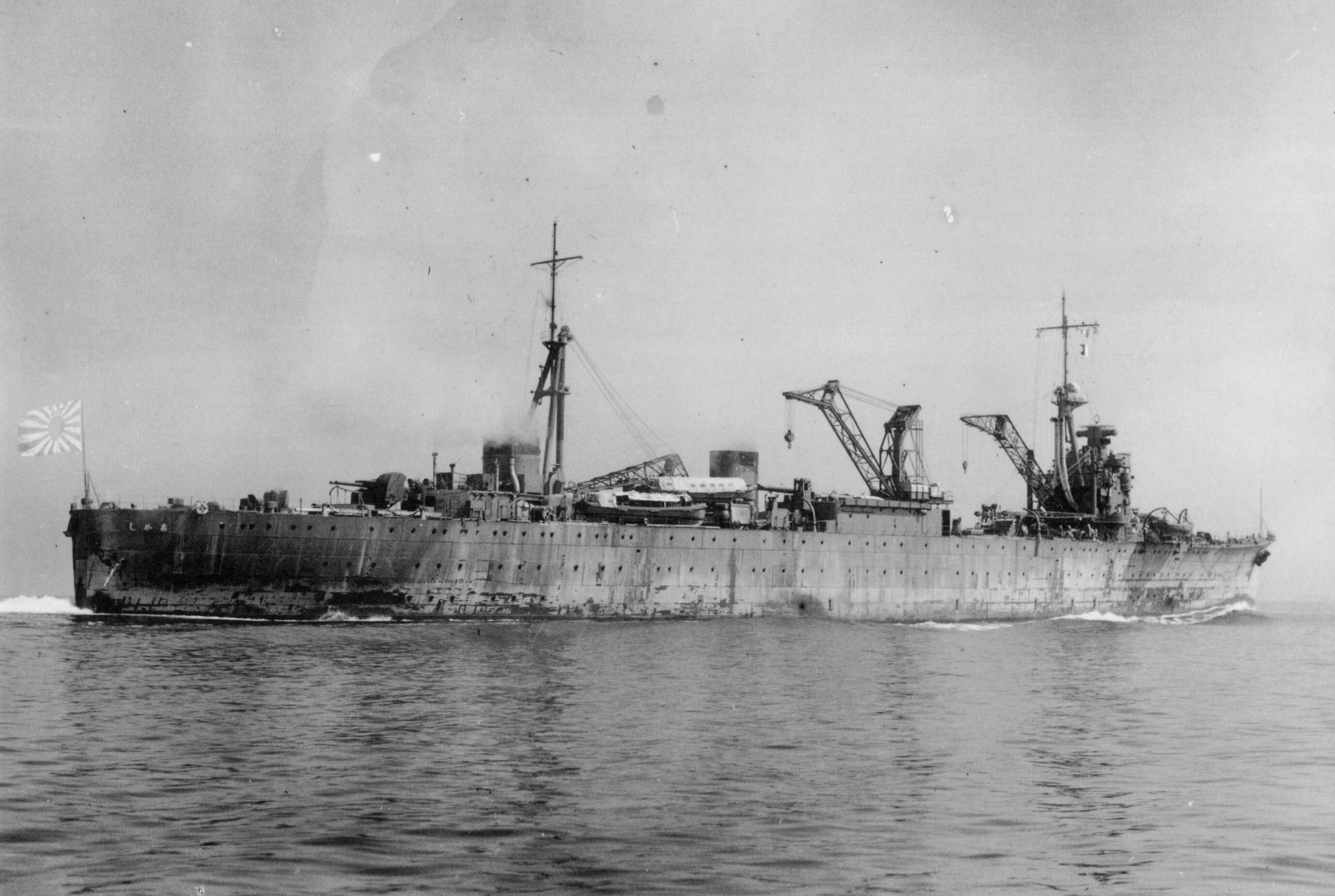
- Akashi trial run off Sasebo in July 1939

History
- Name: Akashi
- Namesake: Akashi Strait
- Builder: Sasebo Naval Arsenal
- Cost: 10,000,000 JPY as Akashi; 23,027,000 JPY as Mihara and Momotori
- Laid down: 18 January 1937
- Launched: 29 June 1938
- Completed: 31 July 1939
- Decommissioned: 10 May 1944
- Fate: Sunk on 30 March 1944

General characteristics
- Type: Repair ship
- Displacement: 9,000 long tons (9,144 t) standard; 10,500 long tons (10,668 t) trial
- Length: 158.50 m (520 ft 0 in) overall; 154.66 m (507 ft 5 in) waterline
- Beam: 20.50 m (67 ft 3 in)
- Draught: 6.29 m (20 ft 8 in)
- Installed power: 10,000 bhp
- Propulsion: 2 × Mitsubishi/MAN Model 60 diesels, 2 shafts
- Speed: 19.2 knots (22.1 mph; 35.6 km/h)
- Range: 8,000 nmi (15,000 km) at 14 kn (16 mph; 26 km/h)
- Crew: 336 men and 433 engineers
- Armament: 4 × 127 mm (5.0 in) L/40 Type 89 AA guns; 12 × Type 96 25mm AA guns

Akashi was a Japanese repair ship, serving during World War II. She was the only specifically designed repair ship operated by the Imperial Japanese Navy. The navy based her design on the US Navy's USS Medusa.

== Construction ==
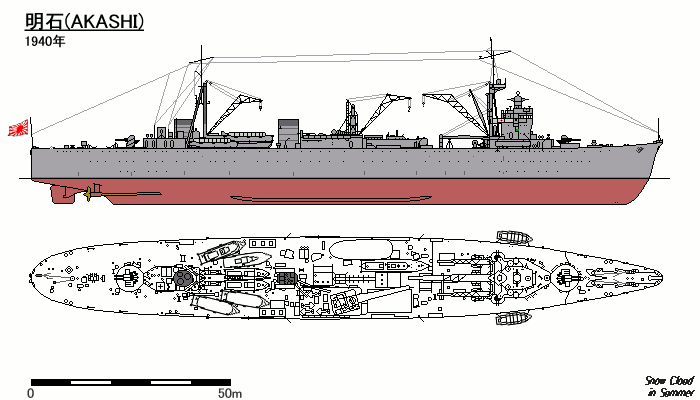
Line drawing of Akashi as she appeared in 1940

In 1937 the Imperial Japanese Navy had converted the old battleship Asahi to serve as a repair ship. After the conversion of Asahi, a decision was made to build a dedicated repair ship with better capabilities for that task. The Imperial Japanese Navy planned for her to carry out 40% of the repairs needed by the Combined Fleet (needing approximately 140,000-man-hours). Therefore, she was equipped with the latest machine tools imported from Germany.

== War service ==
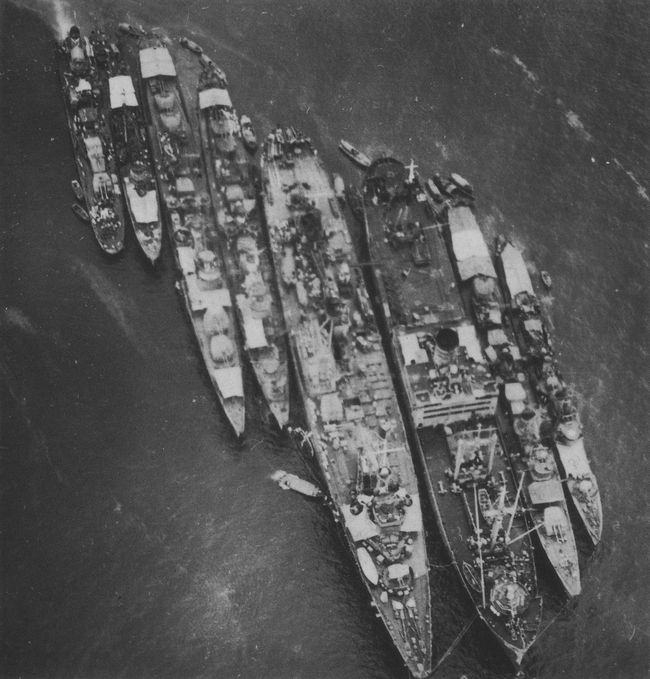
Akashi in February 1943 at Truk

During the war Akashi operated out of the Japanese base in the Truk atoll where she repaired various types of battle-damaged Japanese warships, including Shōkaku in October 1942 and Yamato in December 1943. In February 1944 the Americans made a raid on Truk (Operation Hailstone), sinking and damaging many ships. Akashi was damaged in these attacks and escaped to the Japanese atoll of Palau.

== Fate ==
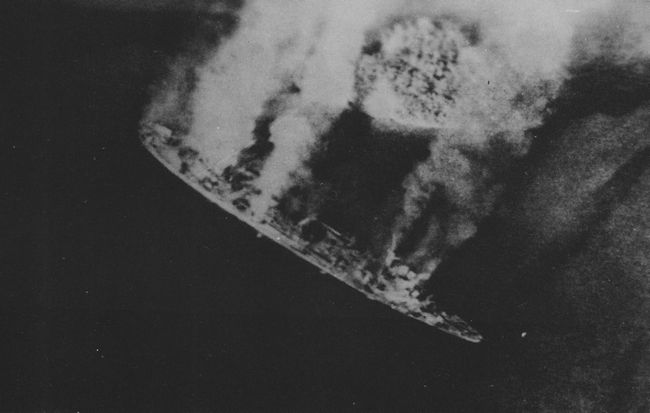
Akashi under attack on 30 March 1944 at Palau

On 30 March 1944, while anchored off Urukthapel in the Palau Islands, Akashi was hit numerous times by bombs and rockets from American aircraft from Task Group 58, during Operation Desecrate One. She was sunk in shallow water with her bridge still remaining above the water.

== Ships in class ==
Ship #	Ship	Builder	Laid down	Launched	Completed	Fate
	Akashi (明石)	Sasebo Naval Arsenal	18 January 1937	29 June 1938	31 July 1939	Sunk on 30 March 1944; salvaged and scrapped in 1954.
5416; 5417	Mihara (三原); Momotori (桃取)	Mitsubishi, Yokohama Shipyard				Cancelled on 11 August 1943.

== Bibliography ==
- "Rekishi Gunzō"., History of Pacific War Vol.51 The truth histories of the Japanese Naval Vessels part-2, Gakken (Japan), August 2005, ISBN 4-05-604083-4
- Ships of the World special issue Vol.47 Auxiliary Vessels of the Imperial Japanese Navy, Kaijinsha, (Japan), March 1997
- The Maru Special, Japanese Naval Vessels No.34 Japanese Auxiliary vessels, Ushio Shobō (Japan), December 1979
- Senshi Sōsho Vol.31, Naval armaments and war preparation (1), "Until November 1941", Asagumo Simbun (Japan), November 1969
- Senshi Sōsho Vol.88, Naval armaments and war preparation (2), "And after the outbreak of war", Asagumo Simbun (Japan), October 1975
