= Hansa Bay =

Bay in Papua New Guinea

Hansa Bay is a bay located on the north coast of Papua New Guinea, in Madang Province, between Madang and Wewak, northeast of Bogia.

== World War II history ==
During the New Guinea campaign, Hansa Bay was a major Japanese naval base and transit station, between the Wewak region and south eastern bases.

The airfields and encampments of Awar and Nubia were also located nearby

On 12 June 1944 the Australian 35th Battalion reached Hansa Bay, pushing inland to the Sepik River.

The abandonment of Japanese stores made it one of the largest arms dumps captured in the New Guinea campaign to that date.

The extensive number of marine and aircraft engagements in the area during World War II, resulted in many wrecks, which are still to be found. These include approximately 35 shipwrecks, which are popular with recreational divers.

Wrecks in the area include:

- USS PT-337: United States Navy motor torpedo boat
- Sydney Maru (also known as (Shishi Maru): an Imperial Japanese Navy cargo ship)
- a B-25D Mitchell (serial number 41-30345 tail "Y") United States Army Air Forces bomber
- a B-24J-35 (serial number 42-73338) USAAF bomber
- a P-39 Airacobra USAAF fighter

== See also ==
- List of US missions against Hansa Bay 1943-1944
- Photograph of Gunner H.J. SWIFT, 2/14 Australian Field Regiment, reading a sign among wrecked boats in the area controlled by the Australian 5th Div. Salvage Unit from The Australian War Memorial
- photograph of Australian Army Barges loaded with Japanese salvage on the run between Hansa Bay and Madang from The Australian War Memorial
