= HMS LST-362 =

LST-1-class landing ship tank

Coordinates: 48.000000°N 17.383333°W

History

United Kingdom
- Name: LST-362
- Builder: Bethlehem Steel Company, Quincy
- Laid down: 10 August 1942
- Launched: 10 October 1942
- Sponsored by: Mrs. Francis E. M. Whiting
- Commissioned: 16 November 1942
- Stricken: 28 April 1945
- Fate: Sunk 2 March 1944

General characteristics
- Class & type: LST-1-class tank landing ship
- Displacement: 4,080 long tons (4,145 t) full load; 2,160 long tons (2,190 t) landing
- Length: 328 ft (100 m) oa
- Beam: 50 ft (15 m)
- Draft: Full load: 8 ft 2 in (2.49 m) forward; 14 ft 1 in (4.29 m) aft; Landing at 2,160 t: 3 ft 11 in (1.19 m) forward; 9 ft 10 in (3.00 m) aft
- Installed power: 2 × 900 hp (670 kW) Electro-Motive Diesel 12-567A diesel engines; 1,700 shp (1,300 kW)
- Propulsion: 1 × Falk main reduction gears; 2 × Propellers
- Speed: 12 kn (22 km/h; 14 mph)
- Range: 24,000 nmi (44,000 km; 28,000 mi) at 9 kn (17 km/h; 10 mph) while displacing 3,960 long tons (4,024 t)
- Boats & landing craft carried: 2 or 6 x LCVPs
- Capacity: 2,100 tons oceangoing maximum; 350 tons main deckload
- Troops: 16 officers, 147 enlisted men
- Complement: 13 officers, 104 enlisted men
- Armament: Varied, ultimate armament; 2 × twin 40 mm (1.57 in) Bofors guns; 4 × single 40 mm Bofors guns; 12 × 20 mm (0.79 in) Oerlikon cannons

HMS LST-362 was a LST-1-class tank landing ship in the Royal Navy during World War II.

== Construction and career ==
LST-362 was laid down on 10 August 1942 by Bethlehem Steel Company, Quincy, Massachusetts. Launched on 10 October 1942 and commissioned into the Royal Navy on 16 November 1942.

During World War II, LST-362 was assigned to the Europe-Africa-Middle theater. She took part in the Sicilian occupation in Italy from 9 to 15 July 1943 and 28 July to 17 August 1943. Then the Salerno landings from 9 to 21 September of the same year.

On 22 January 1944, she took part in the Anzio invasion. While returning from the Mediterranean to the United Kingdom with the convoy MKS-40 in Biscay Bay area on 2 March later that year, she was struck by a torpedo fired by the U-744 on her starboard side. She was the only ship sunk in her convoy.

She was struck from the Navy Register on 28 April 1945.

== Sources ==
- United States. Dept. of the Treasury (1962). Treasury Decisions Under the Customs, Internal Revenue, Industrial Alcohol, Narcotic and Other Laws, Volume 97. U.S. Government Printing Office.
- Moore, Capt. John (1984). Jane's Fighting Ships 1984-85. Jane's Information Group. ISBN 978-0710607959.
- Saunders, Stephen (2009). Jane's Fighting Ships 2009-2010. Jane's Information Group. ISBN 978-0710628886.
- Fairplay International Shipping Journal Volume 222. United Kingdom: Fairplay Publishing Limited. 1967.
