= Patrol torpedo boat PT-337 =

Patrol vessel of the United States Navy

History

United States
- Name: PT-337
- Laid down: 17 February 1943
- Launched: 24 April 1943
- Commissioned: 14 May 1943
- Fate: Sunk by gunfire, 7 March 1944

General characteristics
- Type: PT boat
- Displacement: 38 long tons (39 t)
- Length: 80 ft (24 m)
- Beam: 23 ft (7.0 m)
- Draft: 5 ft (1.5 m)
- Speed: 40 knots (74 km/h; 46 mph)
- Complement: 3 officers and 9 enlisted
- Armament: 4 × 21 in (533 mm) torpedo tubes; 4 × .50 caliber machine guns

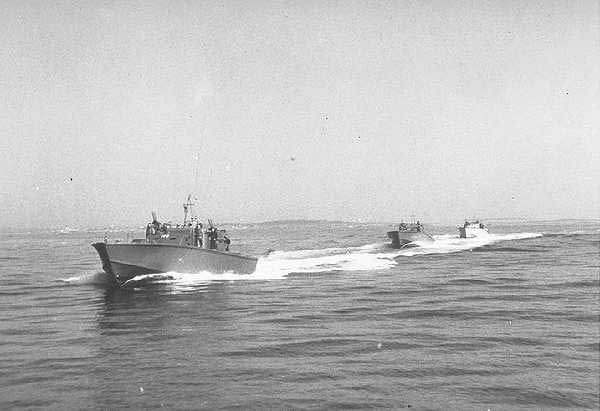
PT boats c. World War II

PT-337 was a PT-103-class motor torpedo boat that was sunk in action during the Pacific Theater of World War II in Hansa Bay, New Guinea, on 7 March 1944.

== Events at Hansa Bay ==
PTs 337 and 338 headed out to a known enemy stronghold on 7 March 1944. Picking up a radar target close to shore and closing to 400 yards (370 m), they encountered two heavily camouflaged luggers moored together. Heavy machine gun fire opened from the beach, and as the boats turned and started to strafe the beach, more machine guns opened up, along with a heavy caliber battery from Awar Point, along the northwestern entrance to the bay.

One shell had hit so close to PT 337 that fragments went whizzing by some of the crew. Three or four more shells dropped near the 337, then one hit the tank compartment, just below the port gun turret, going through the engine room. All three engines were knocked out and the tanks burst into flames. Motor Machinist First Class (MoMM1c) William Daley Jr. was badly wounded in the neck and jaw. The order was given to launch the lifeboat and abandon the boat.

The crew paddled and swam trying to pull away from the exploding 337. The currents were against them and after two hours, they were only 700 yards (640 m) from the boat. Outside the bay, PT 338 was also under fire from shore batteries. Just prior to the 337 being hit, PT 338 had laid smoke and ordered a high speed retirement. When PT 337 did not come through the screen, 338 tried to re-enter the Bay, but each time the boat came under heavy fire and had to retreat.

Daley died before dawn, which left three officers and eight enlisted men on the raft. At dawn on 7 March, the raft had drifted and was less than a mile off the entrance to Hansa Bay. During the morning the current carried it toward Manam island, about six miles (10 km) from the shore. The current was working against the men.

That night, Ensigns Bruce Bales and Henry Cutter tried to paddle ashore on logs. After three hours the current swept the two exhausted men and the raft back together. While they were away, Ensign Robert Hyde and Quartermaster Second Class (QM2c) Allen Gregory set out to swim to shore. By dawn on 8 March, the raft had drifted no more than a mile from the beach. Soon after dawn, Bales, Fucili, and Francis Joseph Schmidt set out for shore. Most of the men had thought the three had reached the Island, but Watson, who said he saw Bales walking on the beach, is the only one who claimed to have seen any of them ashore. Soon afterwards Japanese personnel were seen on the beach.

After dark a small boat came out from shore and at 200 yards (200 m) circled the raft. Two men were in the boat, but made no attempt to bother the raft. After a squall blew up 6–8 ft (2–3 m) waves for a while, the boat was nowhere to be seen after things calmed down. On the morning of 9 March, the remaining men in the raft saw an overturned Japanese collapsible boat, floating a few yards away. They righted the boat, bailed it, and boarded it. Many of the men were suffering from exposure and were covered with salt water sores.

Around noon on the 10 March, a B-25 flew over, and circled the boat. Cutter waved his arms to signal the plane, and they dropped supplies of water, food, cigarettes and medicine. The next morning a PBY Catalina, from U.S. Navy Patrol Squadron VP 34, picked up the five survivors and took them to Dreger Harbour.

Little is known of the PT-337 crew members who attempted to reach the shore. A captured Japanese document indicates that one officer and two enlisted men were captured, although none of them was ever officially reported to be prisoners of war.

== See also ==
- The Story of PT-337 at PacificWrecks.com
