= Wakatake-class destroyer =

Type of Japanese destroyer

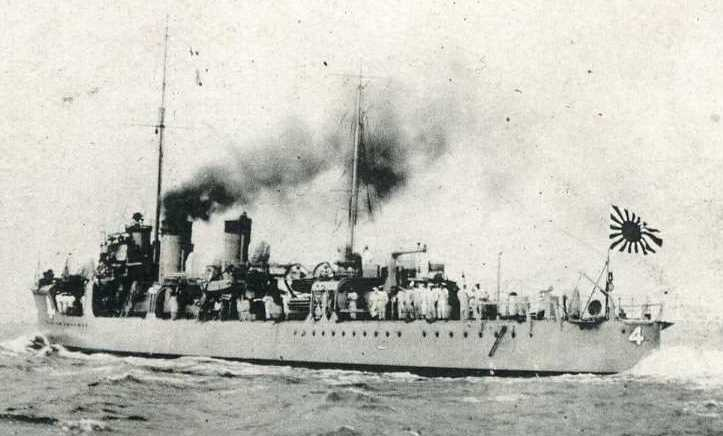
- The Wakatake-class destroyer Kuretake

Class overview
- Name: Wakatake class
- Builders: Fujinagata Shipyards (2); Tōkyō Ishikawajima Shipyard (2); Uraga Dock Company (2); Kawasaki Dockyard Co. (1); Maizuru Naval Arsenal (1)
- Operators: Imperial Japanese Navy
- Preceded by: Minekaze class
- Succeeded by: Kamikaze class
- In commission: 1920–1945
- Planned: 13
- Completed: 8
- Cancelled: 5
- Lost: 7
- Retired: 1

General characteristics
- Type: Destroyer
- Displacement: 900 long tons (914 t) normal, 1,100 long tons (1,118 t) full load
- Length: 83.8 m (275 ft) pp, 85.3 m (280 ft) overall
- Beam: 7.9 m (26 ft)
- Draught: 2.5 m (8.2 ft)
- Propulsion: 2-shaft Mitsubishi-Parsons geared steam turbine, 3 heavy oil-fired boilers 21,500 ihp (16,000 kW)
- Speed: 36 knots (67 km/h)
- Range: 3,000 nmi (5,600 km) at 15 kn (28 km/h; 17 mph)
- Complement: 110
- Armament: 3 × Type 3 120 mm 45 caliber naval gun; 2 × 7.7mm machine guns; 4 × 53cm torpedoes; 20 × mines; (Asagao, after July 1944); 2 × Type 3 120 mm 45 caliber naval guns; 4 × Type 96 AA guns, 4 × 13.2 mm (0.52 in) Type 93 AA guns, 2 × 530 mm (21 in) 6th Year Type TTs; (3 × 6th Year Type torpedoes); up to 36 × depth charges

The Wakatake-class destroyers (若竹型駆逐艦, Wakatakegata kuchikukan) were a class of eight second-class destroyers of the Imperial Japanese Navy.

== Background ==
The medium-sized Wakatake-class destroyers were a follow-on to the Momi class as part of the Imperial Japanese Navy's 8-6 Fleet Program from fiscal 1921 as a lower cost accompaniment to the larger Minekaze-class destroyers. The class was originally planned to consist of thirteen vessels, but due to the Washington Naval Treaty, as well as budgetary limitations, the orders for the last four were cancelled in 1922, with the final number being reduced to eight when No.14 was also cancelled. The Wakatake class was the last class to be rated "second class" and all future destroyers were designed larger. It was planned that the Wakatake-class ships should have names, but upon completion they were given numbers. This proved to be extremely unpopular with the crews and was a constant source of confusion in communications, so in 1928, names were assigned.

== Design ==
The Wakatake-class destroyers were essentially slightly modified Momi-class ships with 50 tons additional displacement and a deeper draft to improve handling characteristics in heavy seas, particularly against rolling. Weaponry layout (with the exception of added AA armaments), general arrangement and silhouette were all identical with the Momi class.

As with the Momi class, a number of types of steam turbines were used for propulsion. Asagao was built with Parsons impulse turbines, Yūgao with Escher Wyss & Cie Zoelly turbines, and the remaining vessels with Brown-Curtis turbines.

The armament for the Wakatake-class was identical to that of the Momi class. The main battery consisted of three Type 3 120 mm 45 caliber naval guns in single mounts, with two twin Type 6 torpedo launchers. Anti-aircraft protection was provided by two 7.7mm machine guns. After the start of the Pacific War, one of the Type 3 guns was replaced by two triple-mount Type 96 25-mm cannons, although some vessels had three twin-mounts and two single-mounts instead. The minesweeping gear was replaced by 36 to 48 depth charges with four launchers. Some of the vessels also were fitted with a Type 13 radar.

== Operational history ==
The small displacement of the Wakatake-class limited their utility as fleet escorts, and as with the Momi-class, they were mainly used in Chinese coastal waters, where their shallow draft made them suitable for operations in rivers and coastal waters.

On 15 September 1932, Sawarabi capsized due to poor stability and sank north of Keelung near Taiwan. In April 1940 Yūgao was re-rated as Patrol Boat No. 46, with considerably reduced armament and the removal of one boiler, which reduced her speed to only 18 knots.

Of the remaining six units, three (Wakatake, Kuretake, and Sanae) were assigned to Destroyer Division 13 under the Kure Naval District, and patrolled the Seto Inland Sea and the Bungo Strait on antisubmarine patrols. The other three (Asagao, Fuyō and Karukaya) were assigned to Destroyer Division 32 under the Chinkai Guard District, which was assigned to patrol the Tsushima Strait screening maritime traffic in the Tsushima Straits. From 10 April 1942, the 1st Surface Escort Division of the Southwest Area Fleet was created, and Desdivs 13 and 32 were assigned to it to provide protection for convoys against Allied submarine activity. The convoy routes were initially those between Moji, Taiwan, and the Philippines. Later, these routes extended to Singapore, French Indochina, the Netherlands East Indies, and Palau. In the course of this service, Karukaya set a record by successfully completing 54 convoy escorts before her loss. Of the six destroyers, four were lost to American submarines, and one to an air attack. Only Asagao survived the war and was finally broken up in 1948.

== List of Ships ==
Construction data
Name	Kanji	Builder	Laid down	Launched	Completed	Fate
Wakatake (ex-No.2)	若竹	Kawasaki Dockyard Co., Japan	13 December 1921	24 July 1922	30 September 1922	Sunk in air attack off Palau during Operation Desecrate One 07.50°N 134.20°E, 30 March 1944; struck 10 May 1944
Kuretake (ex-No.4)	呉竹	Maizuru Naval Arsenal, Japan	15 March 1922	21 October 1922	21 December 1922	Sunk by USS Razorback at Bashi Channel 21°N 121.24°E, 30 December 1944; struck 10 February 1945
Sanae (ex-No.6)	早苗	Uraga Dock Company, Japan	5 April 1922	15 February 1923	5 November 1923	Torpedoed by USS Bluefish in Celebes Sea 04.52°N 122.07°E, 13 November 1943; struck 5 January 1944
Sawarabi (ex-No.8)	早蕨	Uraga Dock Company, Japan	20 November 1922	1 September 1923	24 July 1924	Capsized in storm off Keelung, Taiwan 27.17°N 122.12°E, 5 December 1932; struck 1 April 1933
Asagao (ex-No.10)	朝顔	Tōkyō Ishikawajima Shipyard, Japan	14 March 1922	4 November 1922	10 May 1923	Sunk by naval mine at Kanmon Straits, 22 August 1945; raised, BU 1948
Yūgao (ex-No.12)	夕顔	Tōkyō Ishikawajima Shipyard, Japan	15 May 1922	14 April 1923	31 May 1924	Converted to Patrol Boat No. 46 (第四六号哨戒艇, Dai-46-Gō shōkaitei), 1 February 1940; sunk by USS Greenling at Irōzaki, 10 November 1944
Fuyō (ex-No.16)	芙蓉	Fujinagata Shipyards, Japan	16 February 1922	23 September 1922	16 March 1923	Torpedoed by USS Puffer off Manila Bay 14.44°N 119.55°E, 20 December 1943; struck 5 February 1944
Karukaya (ex-No.18)	刈萱	Fujinagata Shipyards, Japan	16 May 1922	19 March 1923	20 August 1923	Torpedoed by USS Cod west of Luzon 15.38°N 119.25°E, 10 May 1944; struck 10 July 1944

The five cancelled units were initially to be named Shian (from Kawasaki, Kobe)(later No.14), Omodaka (also from Kawasaki, Kobe)(later No.20), Nadeshiko (from Fujinagata Zosensho, Osaka)(later No.22), Botan (from Uraga Dock Co, Tokyo)(later No.24) and Basho (from Ishikawajima Zosensho, Tokyo)(later No.26).

== Naming history ==
The IJN originally planned that the Wakatake-class ships should have names, but upon completion they were given numbers due to the projected large number of warships the IJN expected to build through the Eight-eight fleet plan. This proved to be extremely unpopular with the crews and was a constant source of confusion in communications. In August 1928, names were assigned, but not the original names that were planned.

Naming history of Wakatake-class destroyers
Plan name and transliteration	Original name as ordered	Renamed 24 April 1924	Renamed 1 August 1928
Kikyō (桔梗) Chinese bellflower	Dai-2 Kuchikukan (第二駆逐艦), 2nd Destroyer	Dai-2-Gō Kuchikukan (第二号駆逐艦), No.2 Destroyer	Wakatake (若竹), Bamboo sprout
Yuri (百合), Lilium	Dai-4 Kuchikukan (第四駆逐艦), 4th Destroyer	Dai-4-Gō Kuchikukan (第四号駆逐艦), No.4 Destroyer	Kuretake (呉竹), Black bamboo, Phyllostachys nigra
Ayame (菖蒲) Iris sanguinea	Dai-6 Kuchikukan (第六駆逐艦), 6th Destroyer	Dai-6-Gō Kuchikukan (第六号駆逐艦), No.6 Destroyer	Sanae (早苗), Rice sprouts on May
Kaidō (海棠) Malus halliana	Dai-8 Kuchikukan (第八駆逐艦), 8th Destroyer	Dai-8-Gō Kuchikukan (第八号駆逐艦), No.8 Destroyer	Sawarabi (早蕨), Bracken on Spring
Kakitsubata (杜若) Iris laevigata	Dai-10 Kuchikukan (第十駆逐艦), 10th Destroyer	Dai-10-Gō Kuchikukan (第十号駆逐艦), No.10 Destroyer	Asagao (朝顔), Morning glory
Tsutsuji (躑躅) Azalea	Dai-12 Kuchikukan (第十二駆逐艦), 12th Destroyer	Dai-12-Gō Kuchikukan (第十二号駆逐艦), No.12 Destroyer	Yūgao (夕顔), Ipomoea alba
Shion (紫苑), Aster tataricus	Dai-14 Kuchikukan (第十四駆逐艦), 14th Destroyer	—N/a	—N/a
Ajisai (紫陽) Hydrangea	Dai-16 Kuchikukan (第十六駆逐艦), 16th Destroyer	Dai-16-Gō Kuchikukan (第十六号駆逐艦), No.16 Destroyer	Fuyō (芙蓉), Hibiscus mutabilis
Karukaya (刈萱) One of the Poaceae	Dai-18 Kuchikukan (第十八駆逐艦), 18th Destroyer	Dai-18-Gō Kuchikukan (第十八号駆逐艦), No.18 Destroyer	Karukaya (刈萱), One of several Andropogoneae grasses used for thatching
Omodaka (沢瀉), Alismataceae	Dai-20 Kuchikukan (第二十駆逐艦), 20th Destroyer	—N/a	—N/a
Botan (牡丹), Peony	Dai-22 Kuchikukan (第二十二駆逐艦), 22nd Destroyer	—N/a	—N/a
Bashō (芭蕉), Musa basjoo	Dai-24 Kuchikukan (第二十四駆逐艦), 24th Destroyer	—N/a	—N/a
Nadeshiko (撫子), Dianthus	Dai-26 Kuchikukan (第二十六駆逐艦), 26th Destroyer	—N/a	—N/a
