= Operation Desecrate One =

- Part of Pacific War, World War II
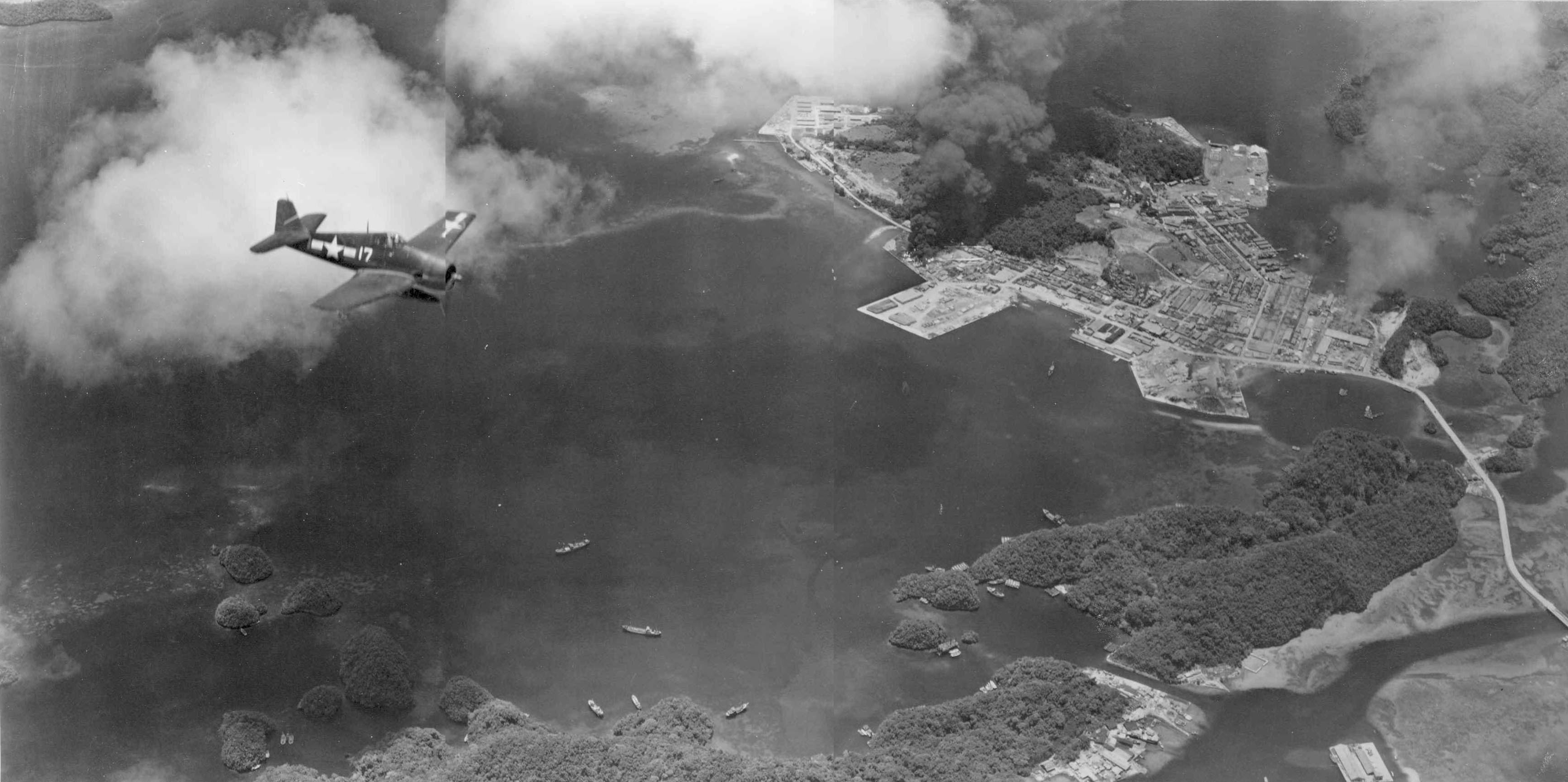
Date	30 March 1944 – 31 March 1944 (1 day)
Location	Palau
Result	American victory

Belligerents
United States	Japan

Operation Desecrate One was a World War II United States Navy operation on 30–31 March 1944. Desecrate One was part of the preparations for Operations Reckless and Persecution, the Allied invasion of western New Guinea.

Desecrate One involved attacks by the aircraft carriers USS Enterprise (CV-6), USS Bunker Hill (CV-17), USS Hornet (CV-12), USS Yorktown (CV-10), USS Lexington (CV-16), USS Monterey (CVL-26), USS Belleau Wood (CVL-24), USS Cowpens (CVL-25), USS Cabot (CVL-28), USS Princeton (CVL-23), and USS Langley (CVL-27) against Japanese military bases on and around Palau. Thirty-six Japanese ships were sunk or damaged in the attacks. Among these ships were significant auxiliary vessels such as the torpedo boat tender Kamikaze Maru, submarine tender Urakami Maru, aircraft transport Goshu Maru, repair ship Akashi and the tankers Iro, Ose, and Sata. In addition, TBF and TBM Avengers from the carriers laid extensive fields of mines in and around the channels and approaches to the Palau Islands in the first tactical use during the Pacific War of mines laid by carrier aircraft.

== Gallery ==
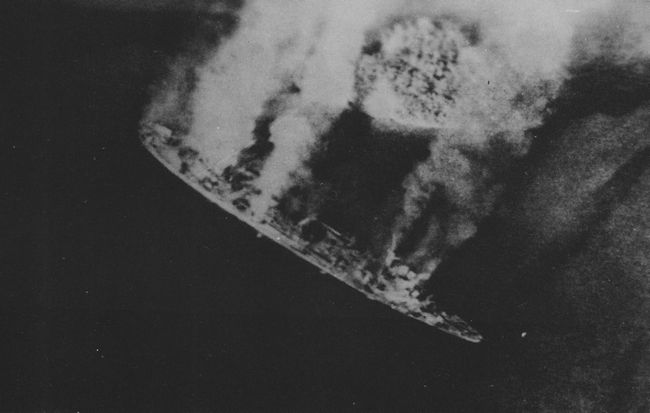
Repair ship Akashi burning

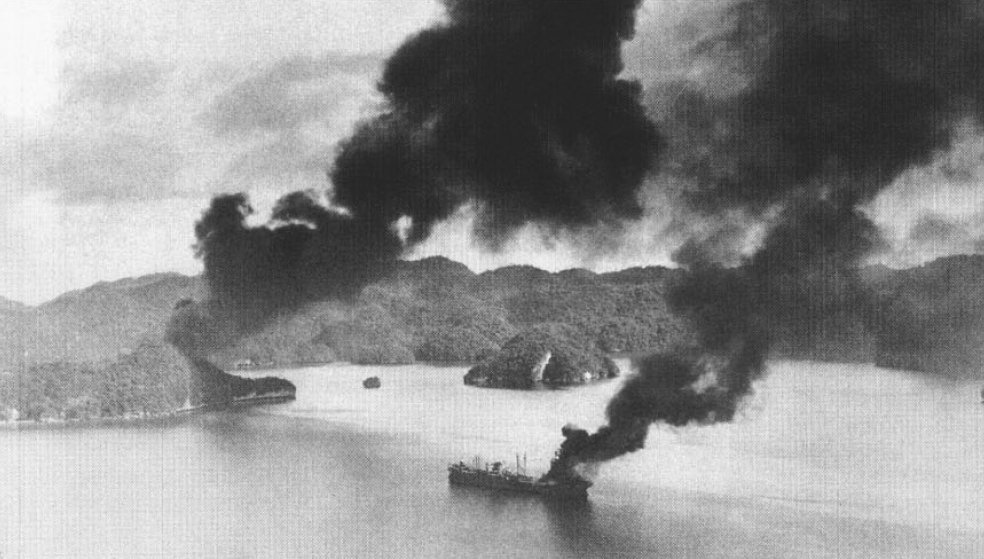
Merchant ship Nagisan Maru burning

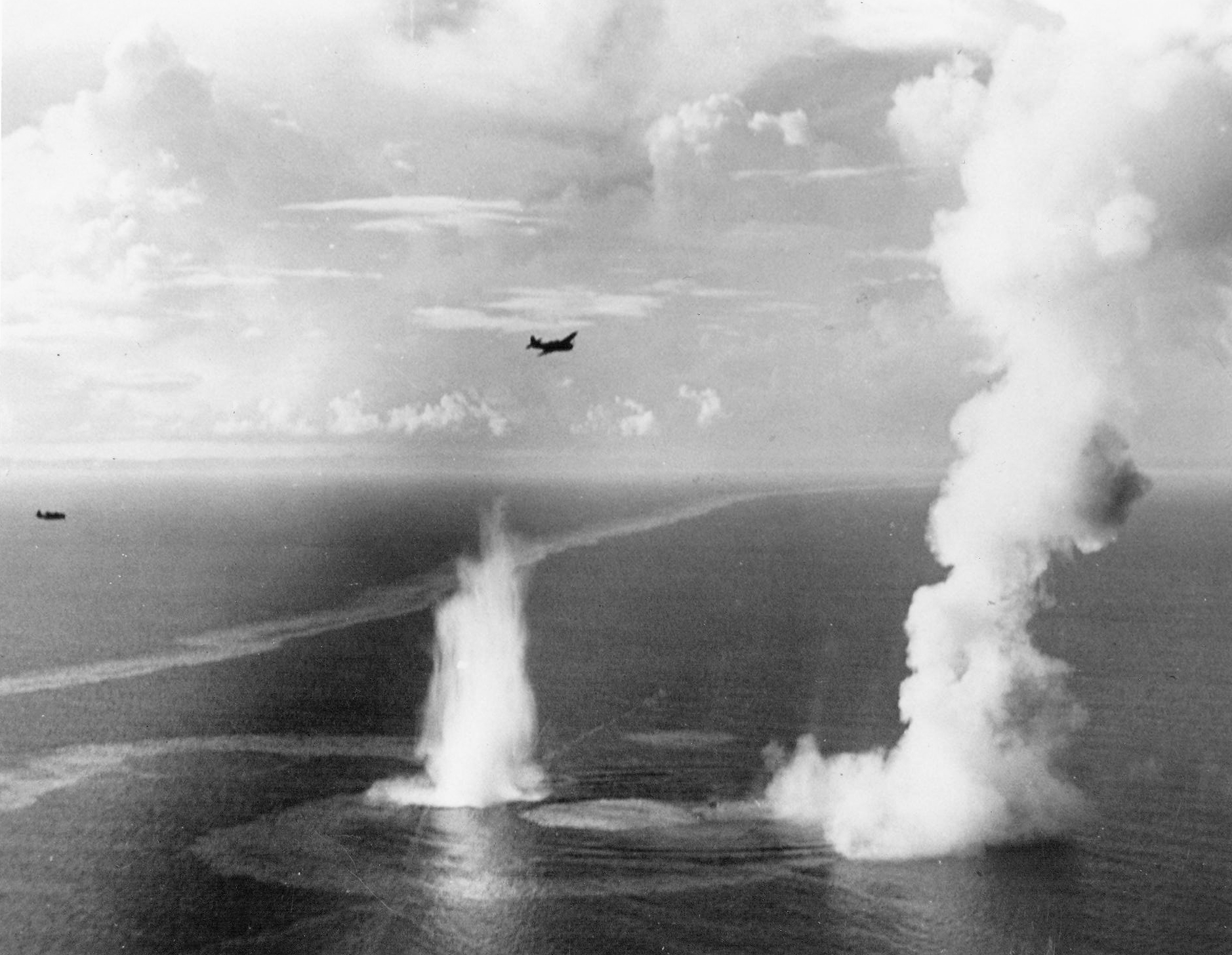
Destroyer Wakatake

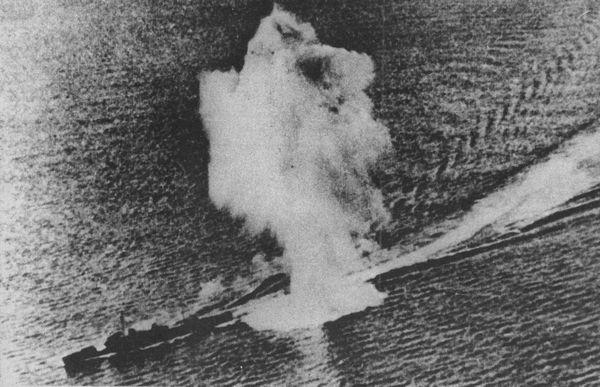
Patrol Boat No. 31
