= INS Dolphin =

INS Dolphin may refer to one of the following submarines of the Israeli Sea Corps:

- INS Dolphin (1944), the former British T-class submarine HMS Truncheon (P353); acquired by the Israeli Sea Corps in 1965; scrapped in 1977
- INS Dolphin (1996), the lead ship of the Dolphin-class submarine; commissioned in May 1998
