= Truncheon =

Truncheon may refer to:

- Club (weapon)
  - Baton (law enforcement)
- Cutting (plant), means of plant propagation used by gardeners
- HMS Truncheon (P353), a British submarine commissioned during World War II and later sold to Israel
- (Shaft of) a spear (obsolete usage, but found in Walter Scott, in Tolkien's Lord of the Rings and in Thomas Malory's Le Morte d'Arthur).
