= Sandy Woodward =

Royal Navy Admiral (1932–2013)

Admiral Sir Sandy Woodward GBE KCB
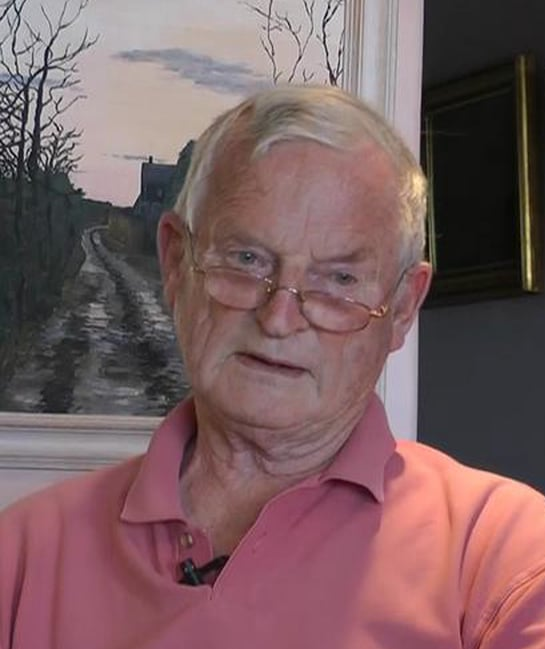
- Woodward in 2012
- Born: 1 May 1932; Marazion, Cornwall, England
- Died: 4 August 2013 (aged 81); Bosham, West Sussex, England
- Military career
- Allegiance: United Kingdom
- Branch: Royal Navy
- Service years: 1946–1989
- Rank: Admiral
- Nicknames: Sandy; Spock
- Commands: HMS Tireless; HMS Grampus; HMS Warspite; HMS Sheffield; Flag Officer First Flotilla; Flag Officer Submarines; Commander-in-Chief Naval Home Command
- Conflicts: Falklands War
- Awards: Knight Grand Cross of the Order of the British Empire; Knight Commander of the Order of the Bath

Admiral Sir John Forster "Sandy" Woodward (1 May 1932 – 4 August 2013) was a senior Royal Navy officer who commanded the Task Force of the Falklands War.

== Early life ==
Woodward was born on 1 May 1932 at Marazion, near Penzance, Cornwall, to a bank clerk. He was educated at Stubbington House School, preparatory school in Stubbington, Hampshire. He then continued his education at the Britannia Royal Naval College in Dartmouth, Devon.

== Naval career ==
On graduation from the Royal Naval College Dartmouth Woodward joined the Royal Navy in 1946. He became a submariner in 1954, and was promoted to lieutenant that May. In 1960 he passed the Royal Navy's rigorous Submarine Command Course known as The Perisher, and received his first command, the T-class submarine HMS Tireless. Promoted to lieutenant-commander in May 1962, he then commanded HMS Grampus before becoming the second in command of the nuclear fleet submarine HMS Valiant. In 1967, he was promoted to commander and became the Instructor (known as Teacher) of The Perisher Course. He took command of HMS Warspite in December 1969. He was promoted to the rank of captain in 1972. In 1974, he became Captain of Submarine Training and in 1976 he took command of HMS Sheffield.

He became Head of Naval Plans in the Ministry of Defence in 1978. In July 1981, he was promoted to rear admiral and appointed as Flag Officer First Flotilla.

=== Falklands War ===
In 1982, he commanded HMS Hermes aircraft carrier group, Task Group 317.8, in the Falklands War. The Commander-in-Chief Fleet Admiral Sir John Fieldhouse, served as the Task Force commander, CTF-317. The task group containing the amphibious ships which launched the invasion TG 317.0 was commanded by Commodore Michael Clapp, with Task Group 317.1 being the landing force itself.

He worked out the timetable for the campaign, starting from the end and working to the start. Knowing that the Argentine forces had to be defeated before the Southern Hemisphere winter made conditions too bad, he set a latest date by which the land forces had to be ashore, that in turn set a latest date by which control of the air had to be achieved, and so on.

He was based aboard the Hermes. He left the detailed management of the air war to the Hermes' operations room whilst he kept an eye on it from his own operations room. According to 801 squadron's commander account, he was a submarines' man and, probably influenced by the 800 squadron aboard the Hermes, had no accurate knowledge of the performances of the radar of the Sea Harrier. All this would be detrimental in part to the air defense of the Task Group.

Possibly the best known single incident was the sinking of the ARA General Belgrano. He knew that General Belgrano, and particularly her Exocet-armed escorts, were a threat to the task force and he ordered that she be sunk. Admiral Sir George Zambellas credited "Woodward's inspirational leadership and tactical acumen ... [as] a major factor in shaping the success of the British forces in the South Atlantic".

Woodward was knighted for his services in the conflict. He wrote a book entitled One Hundred Days, co-authored by Patrick Robinson, describing his Falklands experiences.

=== Later career ===
In 1983, Woodward was appointed Flag Officer Submarines and NATO Commander Submarines Eastern Atlantic. In 1984, he was promoted to vice admiral, and in 1985 he was Deputy Chief of the Defence Staff (Commitments). In 1987, he was promoted to admiral. That year he also served, as Commander-in-Chief Naval Home Command and Flag Aide-de-Camp to the Queen. Woodward retired in 1989.

== Later life ==
"Admiral Woodward – Command Responsibilities" by Elizabeth Massey

The first edition of Woodward's memoirs was published in 1992. They were well received and were updated in 2003 and 2012 with updated recollections as well as responses to the memoirs and responses made by Commodore Michael Clapp. In his later life Woodward wrote various opinion pieces for British newspapers regarding defence matters, particularly the Strategic Defence and Security Review.

== Death ==
He died of heart failure in his 82nd year on 4 August 2013 at Bosham, West Sussex. A memorial service was held for him at Chichester Cathedral on 14 November 2013, with Admiral Sir George Zambellas representing the Queen.

== Personal life ==
Woodward married Charlotte McMurtrie in 1960, the marriage producing a son and a daughter. Lady Woodward died in 2022.

== Honours and decorations ==

On 11 October 1982, Woodward was appointed Knight Commander of the Order of the Bath (KCB) 'in recognition of service within the operations in the South Atlantic'. In the 1989 Queen's Birthday Honours, he was appointed Knight Grand Cross of the Order of the British Empire (GBE).

Ribbon	Details	Year awarded
	Knight Grand Cross of the Order of the British Empire	1989
	Knight Commander of the Order of the Bath	1982
	South Atlantic Medal (with rosette)	1982
	Queen Elizabeth II Silver Jubilee Medal	1977

== Publications ==
- Woodward, Sandy; Robinson, Patrick (1992). One Hundred Days: Memoirs of the Falklands Battle Group Commander. HarperCollins. ISBN 0-00-215723-3.
- Woodward, Sandy; Robinson, Patrick (2003). One Hundred Days: Memoirs of the Falklands Battle Group Commander (2nd Edition, Fully revised and updated). HarperCollins. ISBN 0-00-713467-3.
- Woodward, Sandy; Robinson, Patrick (2012). One Hundred Days: Memoirs of the Falklands Battle Group Commander (3rd ed.). HarperCollins. ISBN 978-0-00-743640-8.

== Footnotes ==
Military offices
Preceded by Sir Peter Herbert	Flag Officer Submarines; 1983–1984	Succeeded by Richard Heaslip
Preceded by New Post	Deputy Chief of the Defence Staff (Commitments); 1985–1987	Succeeded by Sir Antony Walker
Preceded by Sir Peter Stanford	Commander-in-Chief Naval Home Command; 1987–1989	Succeeded by Sir Jeremy Black
