= HMS Tribune (N76) =

Submarine of the Royal Navy

Coordinates: 39°14′N 15°59′E

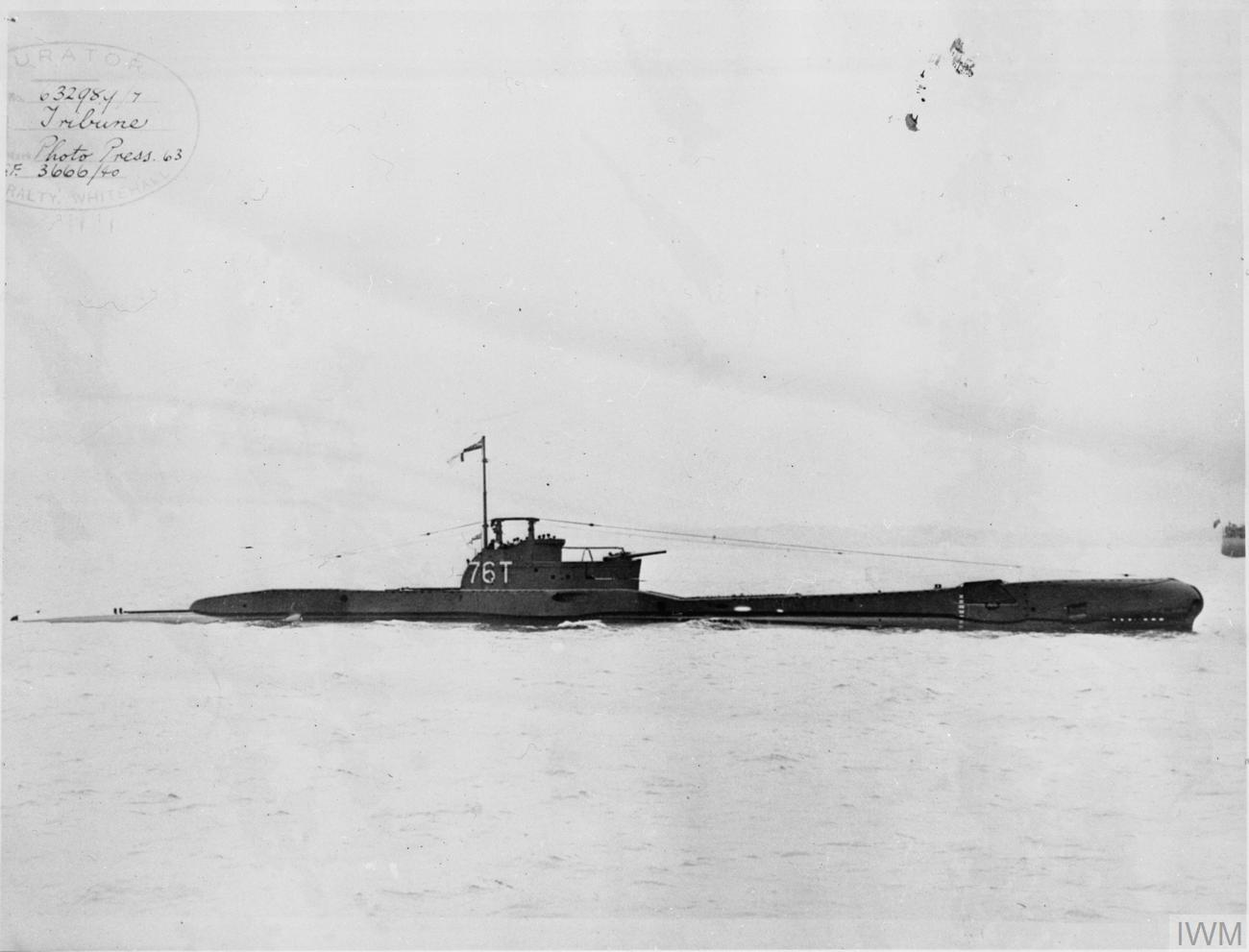
- HMS Tribune

History

United Kingdom
- Builder: Scotts, Greenock
- Laid down: 3 March 1937
- Launched: 8 December 1938
- Commissioned: 17 October 1939
- Identification: Pennant number N76
- Fate: Sold for scrap in July 1947; Broken up in November 1947 by Thos. W. Ward, of Milford Haven.
- Badge

General characteristics
- Class & type: British T class submarine
- Displacement: 1,090 tons surfaced; 1,575 tons submerged
- Length: 275 ft (84 m)
- Beam: 26 ft 6 in (8.08 m)
- Draught: 12 ft 9 in (3.89 m) forward; 14 ft 7 in (4.45 m) aft
- Propulsion: Two shafts; Twin diesel engines 2,500 hp (1.86 MW) each; Twin electric motors 1,450 hp (1.08 MW) each
- Speed: 15.25 knots (28.7 km/h) surfaced; 9 knots (20 km/h) submerged
- Range: 4,500 nautical miles at 11 knots (8,330 km at 20 km/h) surfaced
- Test depth: 300 ft (91 m) max
- Complement: 59
- Armament: 6 internal forward-facing 21-inch (533 mm) torpedo tubes; 4 external forward-facing torpedo tubes; 6 reload torpedoes; 1 x 4-inch (102 mm) deck gun

HMS Tribune was a British T class submarine built by Scotts, Greenock. She was laid down on 3 March 1937 and was commissioned on 17 October 1939. HMS Tribune was part of the first group of T class submarines.

== Career ==
Tribune started the war with operations in the North Sea and off the Scandinavian coast. She had a number of patrols, attacking an unidentified German submarine and merchant, the U-56, the German tanker Karibisches Meer and the German merchant Birkenfels, all without success.

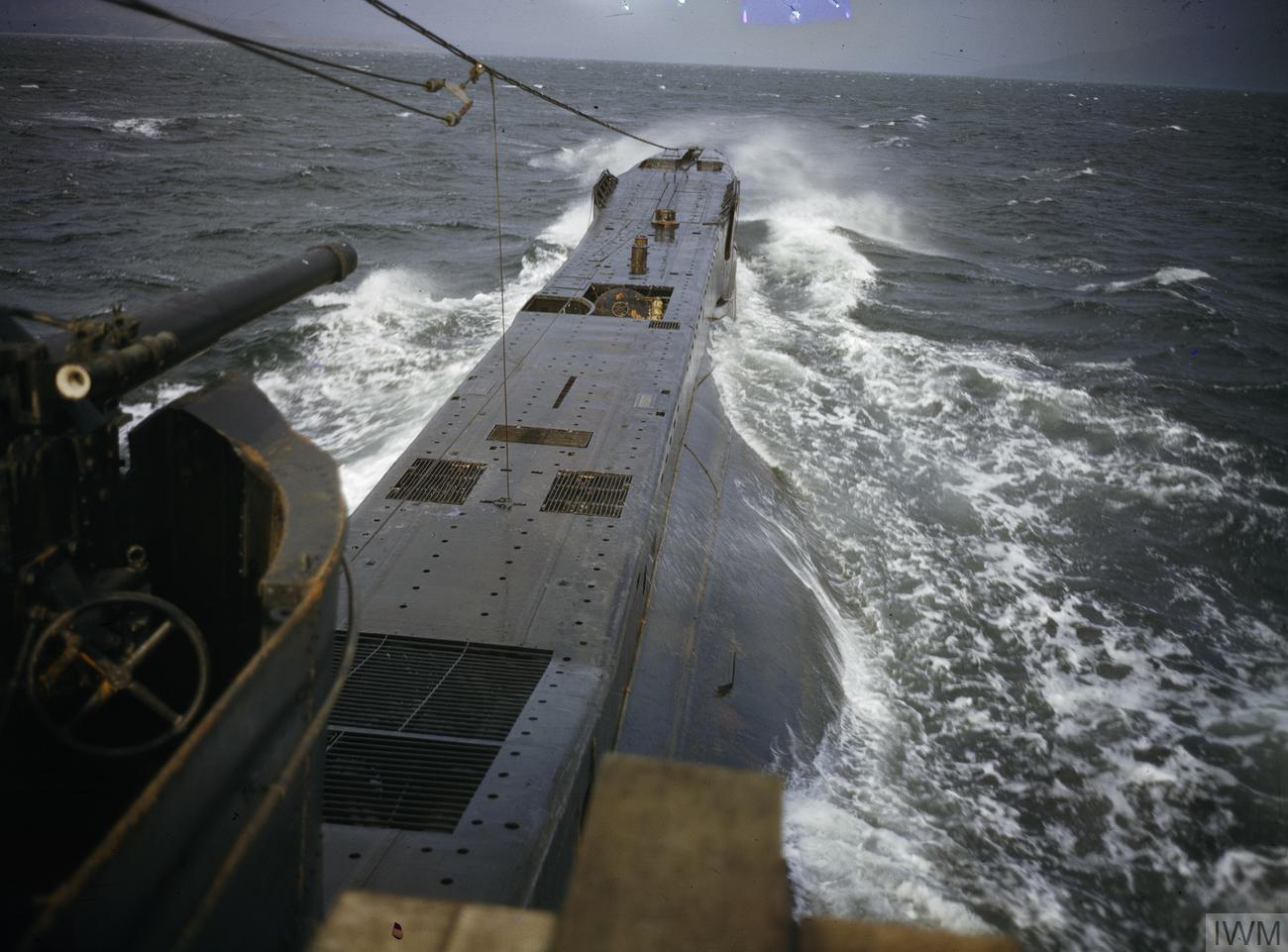
HMS Tribune underway

In the Mediterranean, she damaged the French merchant Dalny, which was beached to prevent her from sinking, and then damaged the now beached Dalny the next day. She also torpedoed and damaged the German tanker Präsident Herrenschmidt, and attacked the Italian merchant Benevento, but failed to hit her.

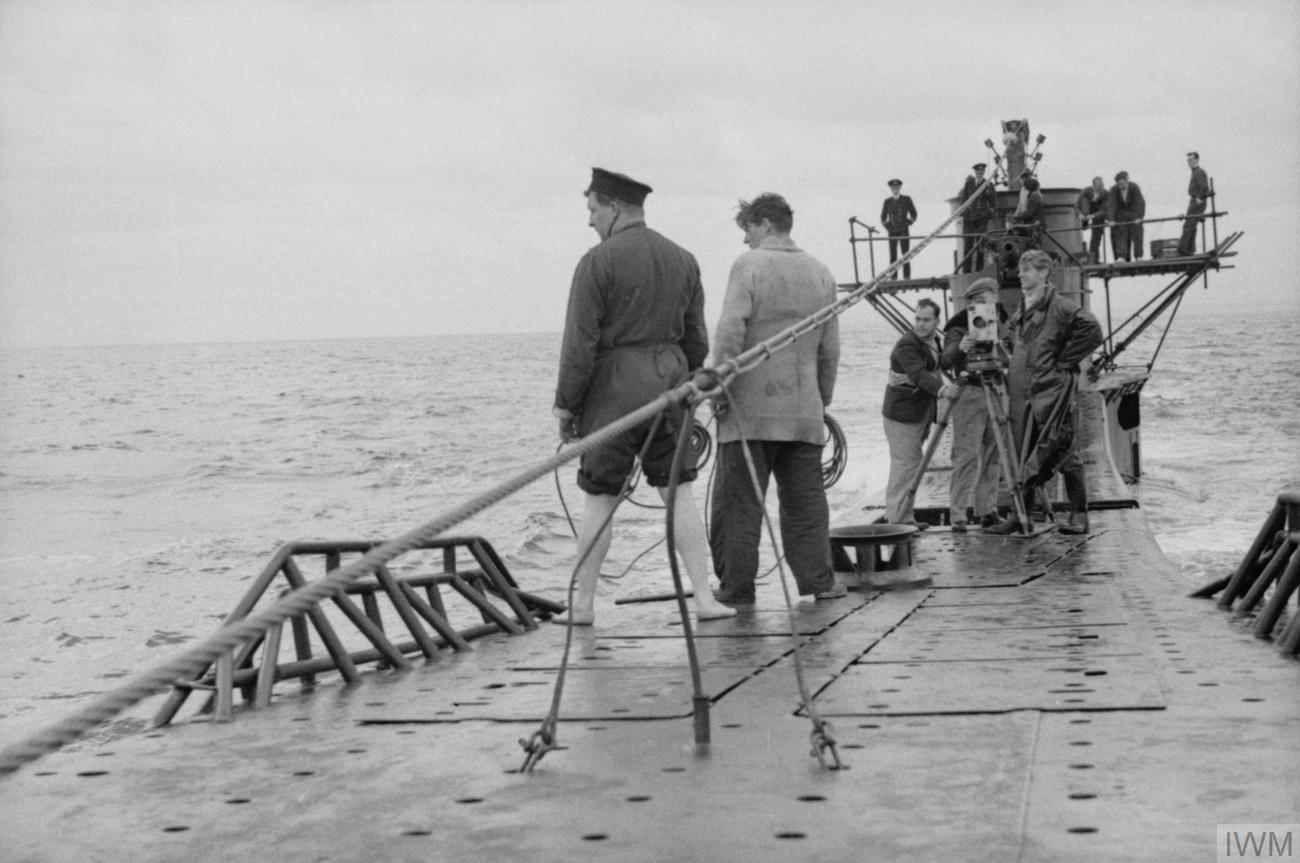
Filming aboard Tribune in 1943

HMS Tribune and crew starred in the 1943 British wartime propaganda film Close Quarters, 'playing' HMS Tyrant on a North Sea patrol off Norway. She survived the war, was sold for scrap in July 1947, and was broken up in November 1947 by Thos. W. Ward, of Milford Haven. Her pennant number N76 was 'posthumously' re-used for an unnamed submarine in the 1951 film "Appointment with Venus", taking British troops out to the Channel Islands to rescue a pregnant pedigree cow from the German occupiers.
