= HMS Grampus (S04) =

Submarine of the Royal Navy

- HMS Grampus (S04)

History

United Kingdom
- Name: HMS Grampus
- Builder: Cammell Laird, Birkenhead
- Laid down: 1955
- Launched: 30 May 1957
- Commissioned: 19 December 1958
- Reclassified: Harbour training ship between 1976 and 1979
- Fate: Sunk as a target ship in 1980

General characteristics
- Class & type: Porpoise class submarine
- Displacement: 2,080 tons surfaced; 2,450 tons submerged
- Length: 290 ft (88 m)
- Beam: 26 ft 7 in (8.10 m)
- Draught: 18 ft (5.5 m)
- Propulsion: 2 × Admiralty Standard range diesel generators, 1,650 hp (1.230 MW); 2 × English Electric main motors, 12,000 hp (8.95 MW); 2 shafts
- Speed: 12 kn (22 km/h) surfaced; 17 kn (31 km/h)submerged
- Range: 9,000 nmi (17,000 km) at 12 kn (22 km/h)
- Complement: 71
- Armament: 8 × 21 inch (533 mm) torpedo tubes, 6 bow, 2 stern; 30 × Mk8 or Mk23 torpedoes, later the Mark 24 Tigerfish

HMS Grampus (S04) was a Porpoise-class submarine. Her keel was laid down in 1955 by Cammell Laird at Birkenhead. She was launched by Lady Shepheard on 30 May 1957. She was first commissioned on 19 December 1958.

== Service ==
On 1 April 1963, Grampus returned to Gosport after spending three weeks under the polar icecap looking for holes in the ice. During the patrol she superficially damaged her hull on the ice. During 1965 she refitted in Devonport Dockyard.

In 1964 she was commanded by Lieutenant-Commander J F Woodward RN.

On 11 January 1968, the French trawler Fomalhaut caught Grampus in her nets in the English Channel. Grampus surfaced and both crews spent over three hours disentangling the nets. In 1968 she was part of the First Submarine Squadron based at HMS Dolphin and in that year was present during 'Navy Days' in Portsmouth Dockyard.

Grampus operated with USS Tigrone in a joint American-British oceanographic operation in the eastern Atlantic in 1972. She visited Funchal, Madeira, in February 1972, accompanied by the Tigrone.

Grampus sank on 18 September 1980 in Loch Fyne as she was being towed as a sonar target. She sits upright in 120 metres of water.

== Publications ==
- Colledge, J. J.; Warlow, Ben (2006) [1969]. Ships of the Royal Navy: The Complete Record of All Fighting Ships of the Royal Navy from the 15th Century to the Present (3rd Rev ed.). London: Chatham Publishing. ISBN 978-1-86176-281-8. OCLC 67375475.
