= HMS Turpin =

Submarine of the Royal Navy

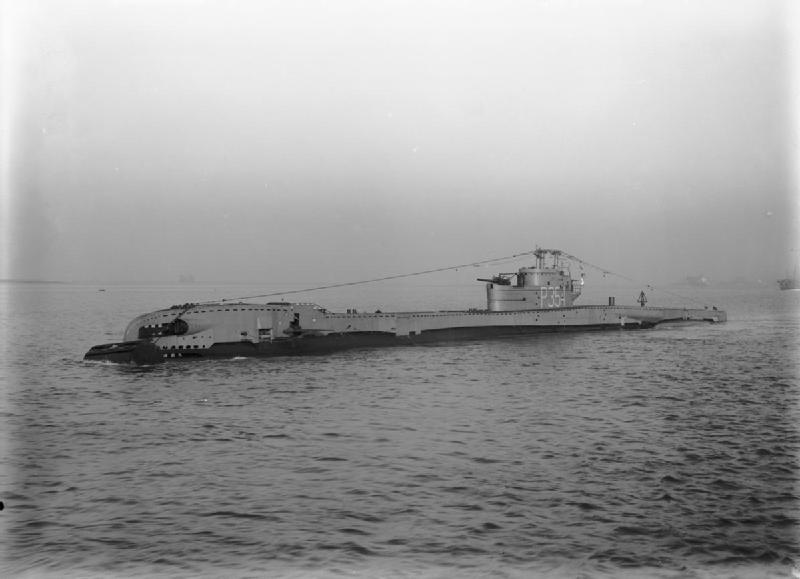
- HMS Turpin

History

United Kingdom
- Name: HMS Turpin
- Builder: Chatham Dockyard
- Laid down: 24 May 1943
- Launched: 5 August 1943
- Commissioned: 18 December 1944
- Fate: Sold to Israeli Navy as INS Leviathan in 1965
- Badge

Israel
- Name: INS Leviathan
- Commissioned: 1967
- Fate: Scrapped 1978

General characteristics
- Displacement: 1,290 tons surfaced; 1,560 tons submerged
- Length: 276 ft 6 in (84.28 m)
- Beam: 25 ft 6 in (7.77 m)
- Draught: 12 ft 9 in (3.89 m) forward; 14 ft 7 in (4.45 m) aft
- Propulsion: Two shafts; Twin diesel engines 2,500 hp (1.86 MW) each; Twin electric motors 1,450 hp (1.08 MW) each
- Speed: 15.5 knots (28.7 km/h) surfaced; 9 knots (20 km/h) submerged
- Range: 4,500 nautical miles at 11 knots (8,330 km at 20 km/h) surfaced
- Test depth: 300 ft (91 m) max
- Complement: 61
- Armament: 6 internal forward-facing 21 inch (533 mm) torpedo tubes; 2 external forward-facing torpedo tubes; 2 external amidships rear-facing torpedo tubes; 1 external rear-facing torpedo tubes; 6 reload torpedoes; QF 4 inch (100 mm) deck gun; 3 anti aircraft machine guns

HMS Turpin (pennant number P354) was one a group three T-class submarines of the Royal Navy which entered service in the last few months of World War II. So far she has been the only ship of the Royal Navy to be named Turpin. She was sold to Israel in 1965 and commissioned into the Israeli Sea Corps in 1967 as INS Leviathan.

== Construction ==
Turpin was laid down at Chatham Dockyard on 24 May 1943, was launched on 5 August 1944 and completed on 18 December 1944 (although she had already been commissioned on 1 October that year). Turpin was a Group 3 T-class submarine, of all-welded construction.

== Career ==
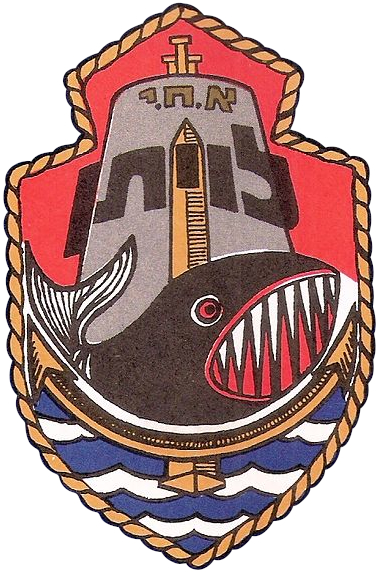
Israeli badge

=== As HMS Turpin ===
At the end of the war, all surviving Group 1 and Group 2 boats were scrapped, but the group 3 boats (which were of welded rather than riveted construction) were retained and fitted with snort masts. In 1955, Turpin was inside the arctic circle on an ELINT mission, listening for specific frequency bands of Soviet radars. Suddenly, the ELINT specialist noted an unusual signal that was from a very short range radar. The operator registered that they were about to be rammed by a Soviet Navy surface vessel, and a crash dive was ordered. The Turpin submerged below a cold water line which allowed them to evade Soviet sonar and escape.

Turpin was sold to the Israeli Navy in 1965, and renamed Leviathan, after a biblical sea monster.

=== As INS Leviathan ===
The submarine was purchased by Israel, along with two of her T-class sisters, in 1965, HMS Truncheon and HMS Totem. She was commissioned into the Israeli Sea Corps in 1967.

She was eventually scrapped in 1978. A Dolphin class submarine named Leviathan was commissioned in 2000 to the Israeli Navy.

== Footnotes ==
- Blackman, Raymond V. B. (1962). Jane's Fighting Ships 1962–63. London: Sampson Low, Marston & Co., Ltd.
- Colledge, J. J.; Warlow, Ben (2006) [1969]. Ships of the Royal Navy: The Complete Record of All Fighting Ships of the Royal Navy from the 15th Century to the Present (3rd Rev ed.). London: Chatham Publishing. ISBN 978-1-86176-281-8. OCLC 67375475.
- Critchley, Mike (1982). British Warships Since 1945: Part 2. Liskeard, UK: Maritime Books. ISBN 0-9506323-6-8.
- Kemp, Paul J. (1990). The T-Class Submarine: The Classic British Design. Annapolis, Maryland, US: Naval Institute Press. ISBN 9781557508263.
- Hutchinson, Robert (2001). Jane's Submarines: War Beneath the Waves from 1776 to the Present Day. London: HarperCollins. ISBN 978-0-00-710558-8. OCLC 53783010.
