= HMS Tapir =

Submarine of the Royal Navy

- HMS Tapir

History

United Kingdom
- Name: HMS Tapir
- Ordered: 1941
- Builder: Vickers-Armstrongs, Barrow
- Laid down: 29 March 1943
- Launched: 21 August 1944
- Commissioned: 30 December 1944
- Fate: Transferred to the Royal Netherlands Navy in 1948
- Badge

Netherlands
- Name: HNLMS Zeehond (P335)
- Commissioned: 12 July 1948
- Fate: Returned to the Royal Navy in 1953

United Kingdom
- Name: HMS Tapir
- Commissioned: 16 December 1953
- Fate: Scrapped in 1966

General characteristics
- Displacement: 1,290 tons surfaced; 1,560 tons submerged
- Length: 276 ft 6 in (84.28 m)
- Beam: 25 ft 6 in (7.77 m)
- Draught: 12 ft 9 in (3.89 m) forward; 14 ft 7 in (4.45 m) aft
- Propulsion: Two shafts; Twin diesel engines 2,500 hp (1.86 MW) each; Twin electric motors 1,450 hp (1.08 MW) each
- Speed: 15.5 knots (28.7 km/h) surfaced; 9 knots (20 km/h) submerged
- Range: 4,500 nautical miles at 11 knots (8,330 km at 20 km/h) surfaced
- Test depth: 300 ft (91 m) max
- Complement: 61
- Armament: 6 internal forward-facing 21 inch (533 mm) torpedo tubes; 2 external forward-facing torpedo tubes; 2 external amidships rear-facing torpedo tubes; 1 external rear-facing torpedo tubes; 6 reload torpedoes; QF 4 inch (100 mm) deck gun; 3 anti aircraft machine guns

HMS Tapir (P335) was a Second World War British T-class submarine, built by Vickers-Armstrongs in Barrow-in-Furness. So far she has been the only ship of the Royal Navy to bear the name Tapir, after the animal.

== Career ==
=== As HMS Tapir ===
The submarine was laid down on 29 March 1943, and launched on 21 August 1944. Commissioned into the Royal Navy on 30 December of that year, she led a distinguished career for such a late entry into the war, torpedoing the German submarine U-486 in the North Sea, to the north-west of Bergen, Norway at position 60°44′N 04°39′E on 12 April 1945.

=== HNLMS Zeehond ===
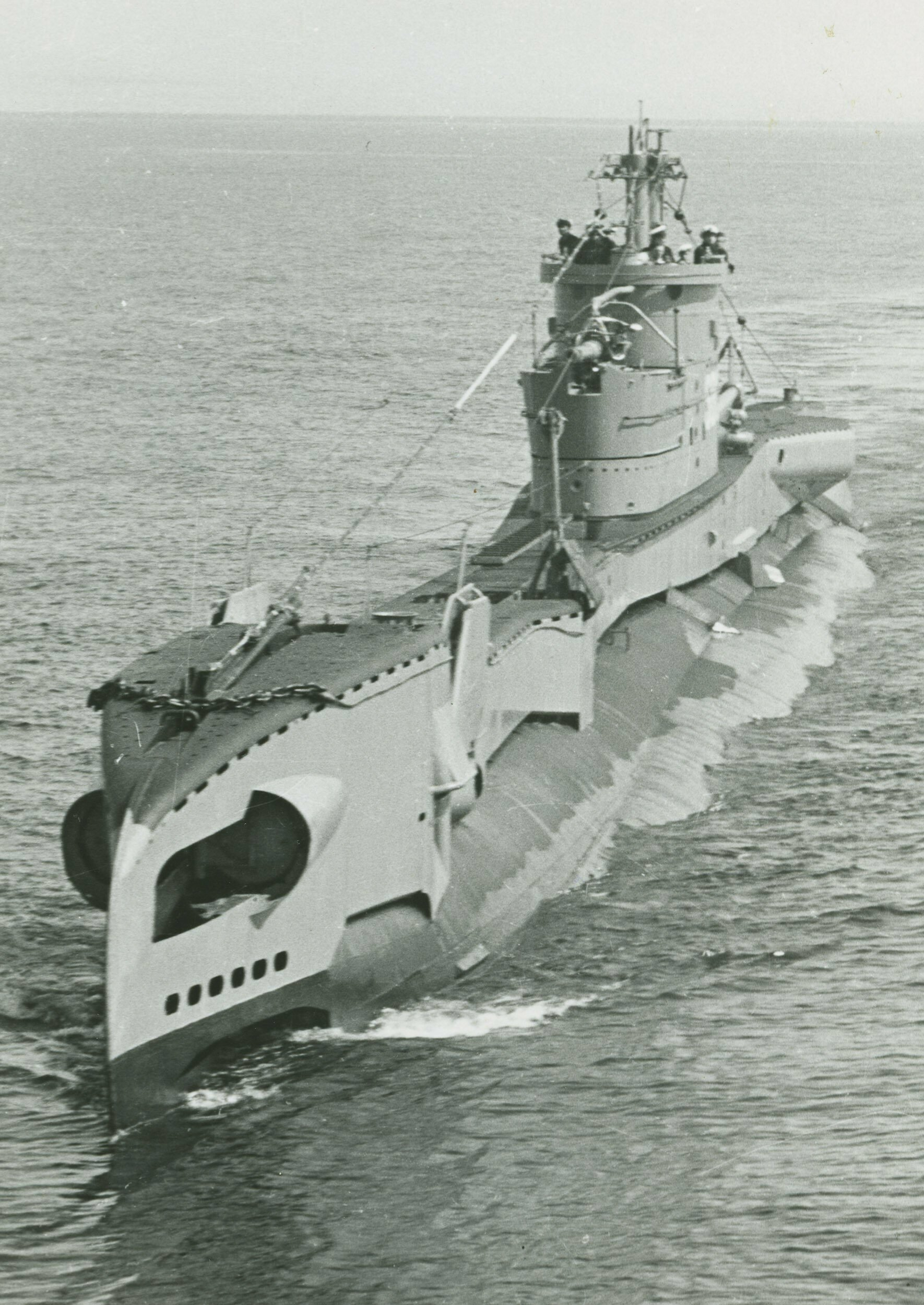
Zeehond in 1953

On 18 June 1948, she was deemed surplus to requirements, and was loaned to the Netherlands for a period of five years, being commissioned into the Royal Netherlands Navy as HNLMS Zeehond (P335) on 12 July 1948. Together with O24 and HNLMS Van Kinsbergen, she visited Curaçao in 1949. Gravity measurements were taken during the trip (the first Dutch ones following the war). The Zeehond conducted a long snorkel trip on the way back. She was transferred back to the Royal Navy on 15 July 1953, finally being re-commissioned and renamed Tapir on 16 December of that year.

HMS Tapir was scrapped at Faslane in December 1966.
