= HMS Tempest (N86) =

Submarine of the Royal Navy

Coordinates: 39°15′0″N 17°45′0″E

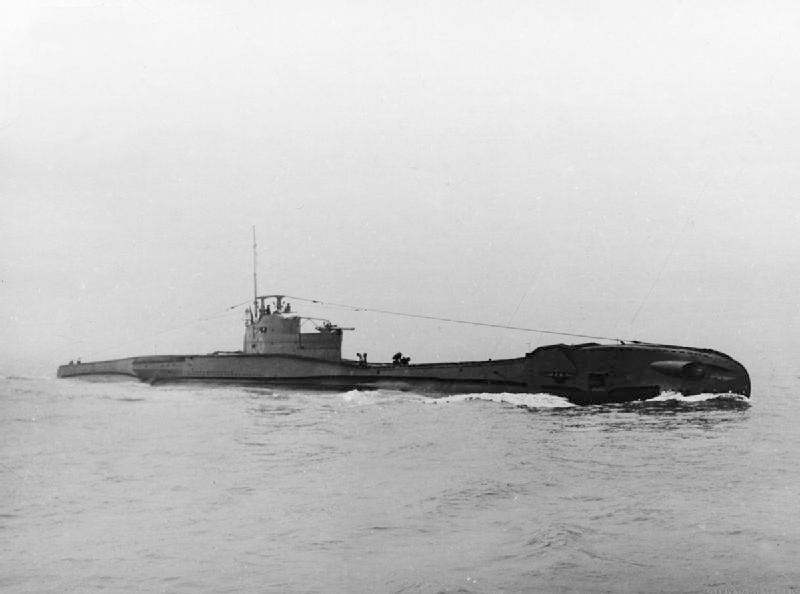
- HMS Tempest

History

United Kingdom
- Name: HMS Tempest
- Builder: Cammell Laird & Co Limited, Birkenhead
- Laid down: 6 June 1940
- Launched: 10 June 1941
- Commissioned: 6 December 1941
- Identification: Pennant number N86
- Fate: Sunk 13 February 1942
- Badge

General characteristics
- Class & type: British T class submarine
- Displacement: 1,090 tons surfaced; 1,575 tons submerged
- Length: 275 ft (84 m)
- Beam: 26 ft 6 in (8.08 m)
- Draught: 16.3 ft (5.0 m)
- Propulsion: Two shafts; Twin diesel engines 2,500 hp (1.86 MW) each; Twin electric motors 1,450 hp (1.08 MW) each
- Speed: 15.25 knots (28.7 km/h) surfaced; 9 knots (20 km/h) submerged
- Range: 4,500 nautical miles at 11 knots (8,330 km at 20 km/h) surfaced
- Test depth: 300 ft (91 m) max
- Complement: 61
- Armament: 6 internal forward-facing 21-inch (533 mm) torpedo tubes; 2 external forward-facing torpedo tubes; 3 external backward-facing torpedo tubes; 6 reload torpedoes; 1 x 4-inch (102 mm) deck gun; 3 anti-aircraft machine guns

HMS Tempest (N86) was a T-class submarine of the Royal Navy. She was laid down by Cammell Laird & Co Limited, Birkenhead and launched in June 1941, serving in the Mediterranean theatre until 13 February 1942, when she was sunk by the Regia Marina while on patrol the Gulf of Taranto by the Spica class torpedo boat Circe.

== Sources ==
- Colledge, J. J.; Warlow, Ben (2006) [1969]. Ships of the Royal Navy: The Complete Record of All Fighting Ships of the Royal Navy from the 15th Century to the Present (3rd Rev ed.). London: Chatham Publishing. ISBN 978-1-86176-281-8. OCLC 67375475.
- Greentree, David (2016). British Submarine vs. Italian Torpedo Boat, Mediterranean 1940–43. Duel (No.74). Oxford: Osprey. ISBN 978-1-4728-1414-2.
- Hutchinson, Robert (2001). Jane's Submarines: War Beneath the Waves from 1776 to the Present Day. London: HarperCollins. ISBN 978-0-00-710558-8. OCLC 53783010.
