= HMS Terrapin =

Royal Navy T class submarine in service 1944-1945

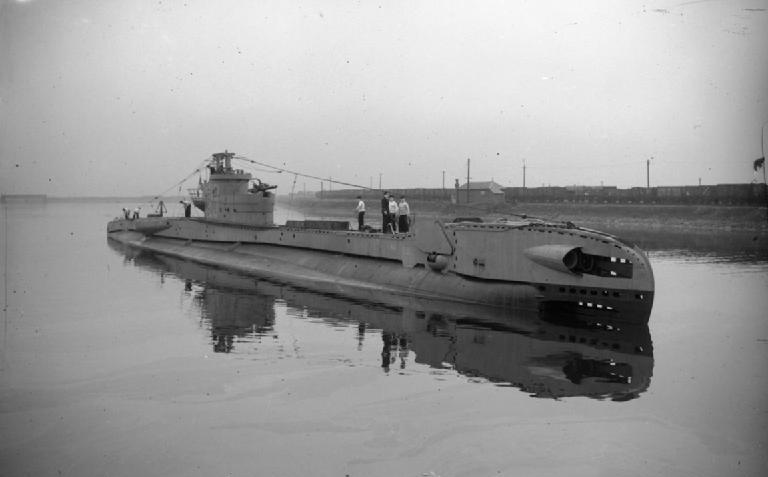
- HMS Terrapin

History

United Kingdom
- Builder: Vickers-Armstrongs, Barrow
- Laid down: 19 October 1942
- Launched: 31 August 1943
- Commissioned: 22 January 1944
- Fate: Damaged by depth charges, scrapped June 1946
- Badge

General characteristics
- Class & type: British T class submarine
- Displacement: 1,290 tons surfaced; 1,560 tons submerged
- Length: 276 ft 6 in (84.28 m)
- Beam: 25 ft 6 in (7.77 m)
- Draught: 12 ft 9 in (3.89 m) forward; 14 ft 7 in (4.45 m) aft
- Propulsion: Two shafts; Twin diesel engines 2,500 hp (1.86 MW) each; Twin electric motors 1,450 hp (1.08 MW) each
- Speed: 15.5 knots (28.7 km/h) surfaced; 9 knots (20 km/h) submerged
- Range: 4,500 nautical miles at 11 knots (8,330 km at 20 km/h) surfaced
- Test depth: 300 ft (91 m) max
- Complement: 61
- Armament: 6 internal forward-facing 21 inch (533 mm) torpedo tubes; 2 external forward-facing torpedo tubes; 2 external amidships rear-facing torpedo tubes; 1 external rear-facing torpedo tubes; 6 reload torpedoes; QF 4 inch (100 mm) deck gun; 3 anti aircraft machine guns

HMS Terrapin was a British submarine of the third group of the T class. She was built as P323 by Vickers-Armstrongs, Barrow and launched on 31 August 1943. So far she has been the only ship of the Royal Navy to bear the name Terrapin, after the animal of that name. Apart from a brief period in home waters off the Scandinavian coast, Terrapin served in the Far East for much of her wartime career.

== Service ==
Though only commissioned on 22 January 1944, she had a comparatively active career. In March 1944 she attacked a German convoy off Flekkefjord, Norway, torpedoing and damaging the German catapult ship Schwabenland, and the German tanker Wörth (the former Dutch Omala). The Schwabenland was grounded at Sildeneset in Abelnes harbour to prevent her from sinking and the Wörth was towed to port.

Terrapin was then assigned to the Pacific Far East in mid 1944. She opened her career by bombarding Japanese installations at Gunung Sitoli (Nias Island), western Sumatra. She also sank a Japanese coaster with gunfire and damaged another. She went on to sink the Japanese auxiliary netlayer Kumano Maru, the Japanese minesweeper W 5, and ten Japanese sailing vessels, damaging another.

Terrapin often operated with HMS Trenchant, and together they sank the Japanese tanker Yaei Maru No.6, the Japanese auxiliary minesweeper Reisui Maru, the Japanese submarine chaser Ch 8, a fishing vessel and seven coasters. Terrapin herself sank another small craft with gunfire.

Terrapin was damaged on 19 May 1945 by depth charges from Japanese escort vessels while attacking an escorted tanker. With the assistance of the American submarine USS Cavalla, she was escorted and returned to Fremantle, Australia. After inspection Terrapin was declared a constructive total loss on return to harbour and was later scrapped in June 1946.
