= HMS Tiara =

Submarine of the Royal Navy

History

United Kingdom
- Name: Tiara
- Builder: Portsmouth Dockyard
- Laid down: 8 April 1943
- Launched: 18 April 1944
- Identification: Pennant number P351
- Fate: Scrapped June 1947

General characteristics
- Class & type: T-class submarine
- Displacement: 1,290 tons surfaced; 1,560 tons submerged
- Length: 276 ft 6 in (84.28 m)
- Beam: 25 ft 6 in (7.77 m)
- Draught: 12 ft 9 in (3.89 m) forward; 14 ft 7 in (4.45 m) aft
- Propulsion: Two shafts; Twin diesel engines 2,500 hp (1,900 kW) each; Twin electric motors 1,450 hp (1,080 kW) each
- Speed: 15.5 kn (28.7 km/h; 17.8 mph) surfaced; 9 kn (17 km/h; 10 mph) submerged
- Range: 4,500 nmi (8,300 km; 5,200 mi) at 11 kn (20 km/h; 13 mph) surfaced
- Test depth: 300 ft (91 m) max
- Complement: 61
- Armament: 6 internal forward-facing 21 inch (533 mm) torpedo tubes; 2 external forward-facing torpedo tubes; 2 external amidships rear-facing torpedo tubes; 1 external rear-facing torpedo tubes; 6 reload torpedoes; QF 4 inch (100 mm) deck gun; 3 anti-aircraft machine guns

HMS Tiara (P351) was a Royal Navy Group Three T-class submarine laid down at Portsmouth Dockyard on 8 April 1943 and launched on 18 April 1944. However the war ended before she was completed and she arrived at Dover Industries for scrapping in June 1947 . Her sister vessel Thor was launched on the same day at Portsmouth dockyard and not completed either. She would have been the only ship of the Royal Navy to bear the name Tiara.
