= HMS Totem =

Submarine of the Royal Navy

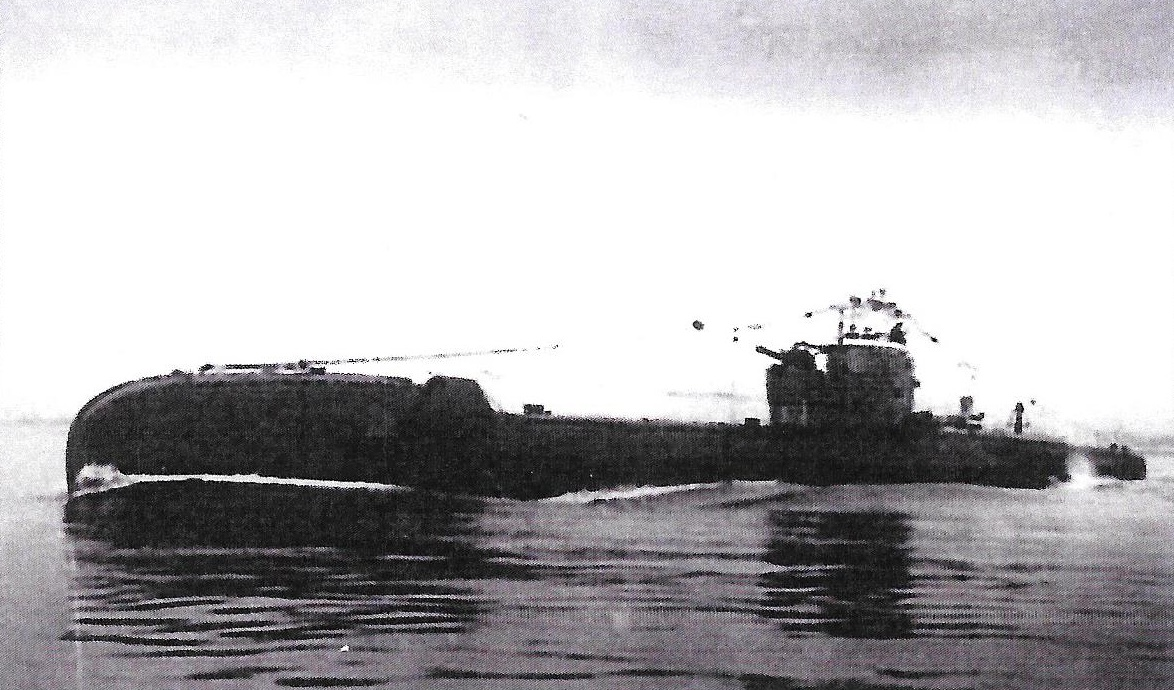
- HMS Totem in Plymouth Sound, December 1944

History

United Kingdom
- Name: HMS Totem
- Ordered: 1941
- Builder: HM Dockyard Devonport
- Laid down: 22 October 1942
- Launched: 28 September 1943
- Commissioned: 9 January 1945
- Identification: Pennant number: P352
- Fate: Sold to the Israeli Navy in 1965 (INS Dakar)
- Badge

General characteristics
- Class & type: T-class submarine
- Displacement: 1,290 tons surfaced; 1,560 tons submerged
- Length: 276 ft 6 in (84.28 m)
- Beam: 25 ft 6 in (7.77 m)
- Draught: 12 ft 9 in (3.89 m) forward; 14 ft 7 in (4.45 m) aft
- Propulsion: Two shafts; Twin diesel engines 2,500 hp (1.86 MW) each; Twin electric motors 1,450 hp (1.08 MW) each
- Speed: 15.5 knots (28.7 km/h) surfaced; Nine knots (17 km/h) submerged
- Range: 4,500 nautical miles at 11 knots (8,330 km at 20 km/h) surfaced
- Test depth: 300 ft (91 m) max
- Complement: 61
- Armament: Six internal forward-facing 21 inch (533 mm) torpedo tubes; Two external forward-facing torpedo tubes; Two external amidships rear-facing torpedo tubes; One external rear-facing torpedo tube; Six reload torpedoes; QF 4-inch (100 mm) deck gun; Three anti-aircraft machine guns

HMS Totem was a Group 3 T-class submarine of the Royal Navy which entered service in the last few months of World War II. To-date, she is the only ship of the Royal Navy to have been named Totem.

Totem was sold to Israel in 1965 and commissioned into the Israeli Sea Corps in 1967 as INS Dakar. She sank whilst on passage from the United Kingdom to Israel in January 1968.

== As HMS Totem ==
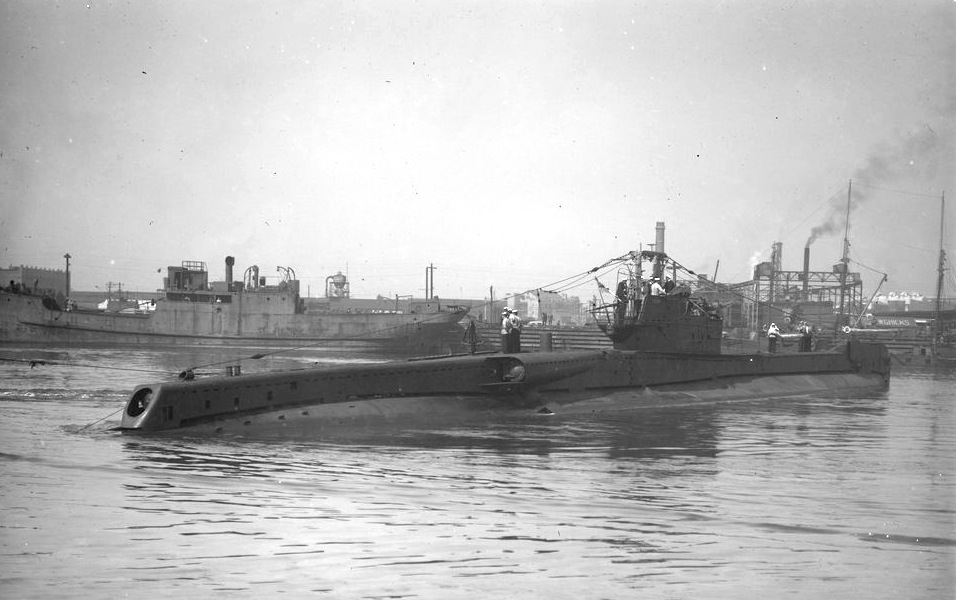
HMS Totem in September 1945 – two of the three rear-facing external torpedo tubes are clearly visible

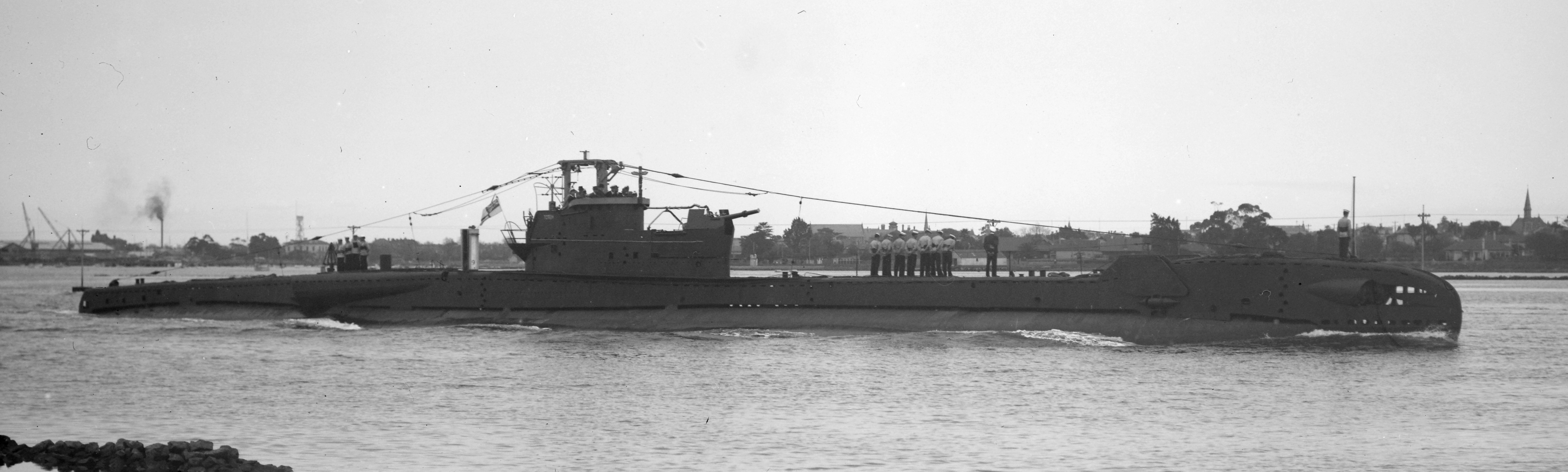
Totem in September 1945. Her totem pole is the cross-like object on the forward part of the bridge

The submarine was presented with a totem pole by the Cowichan Tribes in 1945, which was stolen during the 1950s when the boat was visiting Halifax, Canada. The pole was fitted to the front of the bridge fin when the submarine was in harbour.

At the end of the war, all surviving T-class Group 1 and Group 2 boats were scrapped, but the Group 3 boats (which were of welded rather than riveted construction) were retained and fitted with snorkel masts.

In January 1948 it was formally acknowledged that the main operational function of the British submarine fleet would now be to intercept Soviet submarines slipping out of their bases in Northern Russia to attack British and Allied merchant vessels. The following April, the Assistant Chief of Naval Staff, Rear-Admiral Geoffrey Oliver circulated a paper in which he proposed that British submarines take a more offensive role by attacking Soviet submarines off the Northern Russian coast and mining the waters in the area. With the surface fleet dramatically reduced after the end of the Second World War, he commented that this was one of the few methods the Royal Navy had for "getting to the enemy on his home ground".

To fulfil this new role, Totem was one of eight boats which were extensively modified to become "super T-conversions", giving them higher speed and quieter operation underwater. Five further T-class submarines were given much less extensive streamlining improvements.

The work on Totem was done between 1951 and May 1953 at Chatham Dockyard (which carried out all eight super T-conversions), and involved inserting an additional hull section 14 feet (4.3 m) long to accommodate extra switchgear and an extra pair of electric motors and replacing the batteries. The hull was streamlined, which included the removal of the deck gun and the replacement of the bridge fin with one which was taller, enclosing the periscopes and masts. The radar and sonar were updated at the same time. After the submarine had returned to service, her top speed exceeded 18 knots (33 km/h), aided by the unofficial removal in the dockyard at Malta of the housing for the airguard radar aerial which added 3/4 knot to her top speed.

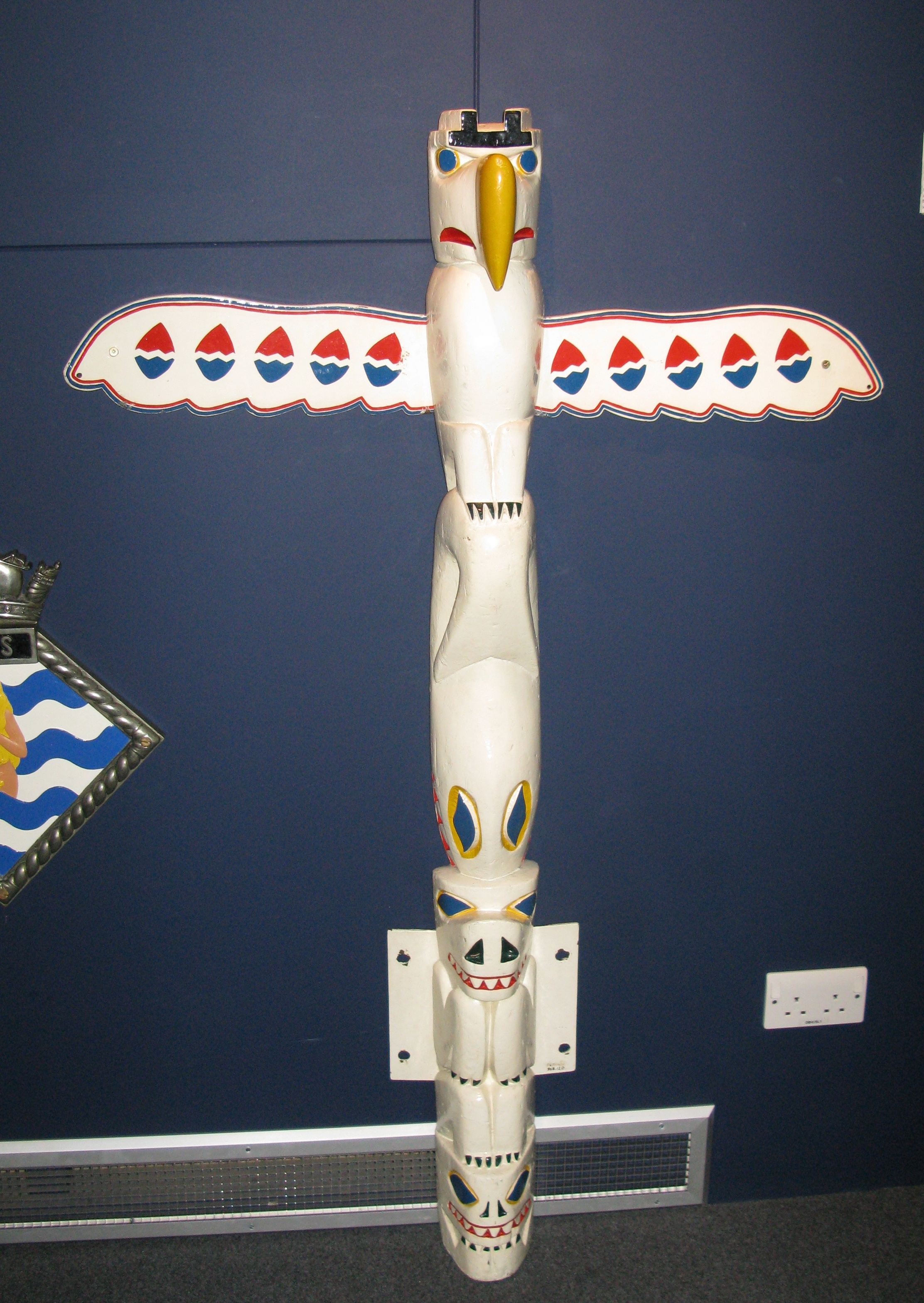
Totem pole carried by Totem

Her captain at the time, Commander John Coote, reported that the modifications made evading her hunters during exercises easy, since the submarine could cover a mile in four minutes at 18 knots (33 km/h), and following another ten minutes running silently at 12 knots (22 km/h) could be 3 miles (4.8 km) away from the escort.

In 1953 she took part in the Fleet Review to celebrate the Coronation of Queen Elizabeth II. During early 1955 Totem carried out "Operation Defiant", a six-week patrol in the Barents Sea to gather Signals intelligence on Soviet naval forces. Towards the end of the mission, Totem was heavily depth charged, damaging the ship's periscope and dived to a depth of 280 feet (85 m) to evade the attacks, drifting into a minefield in the process before escaping.

Totem was refitted at Malta from December 1961 to January 1963, and then returned to home waters, recommissioning at HMNB Portsmouth with a new crew on 28 January 1963 before joining the 1st Submarine Flotilla at Gosport.

== INS Dakar ==
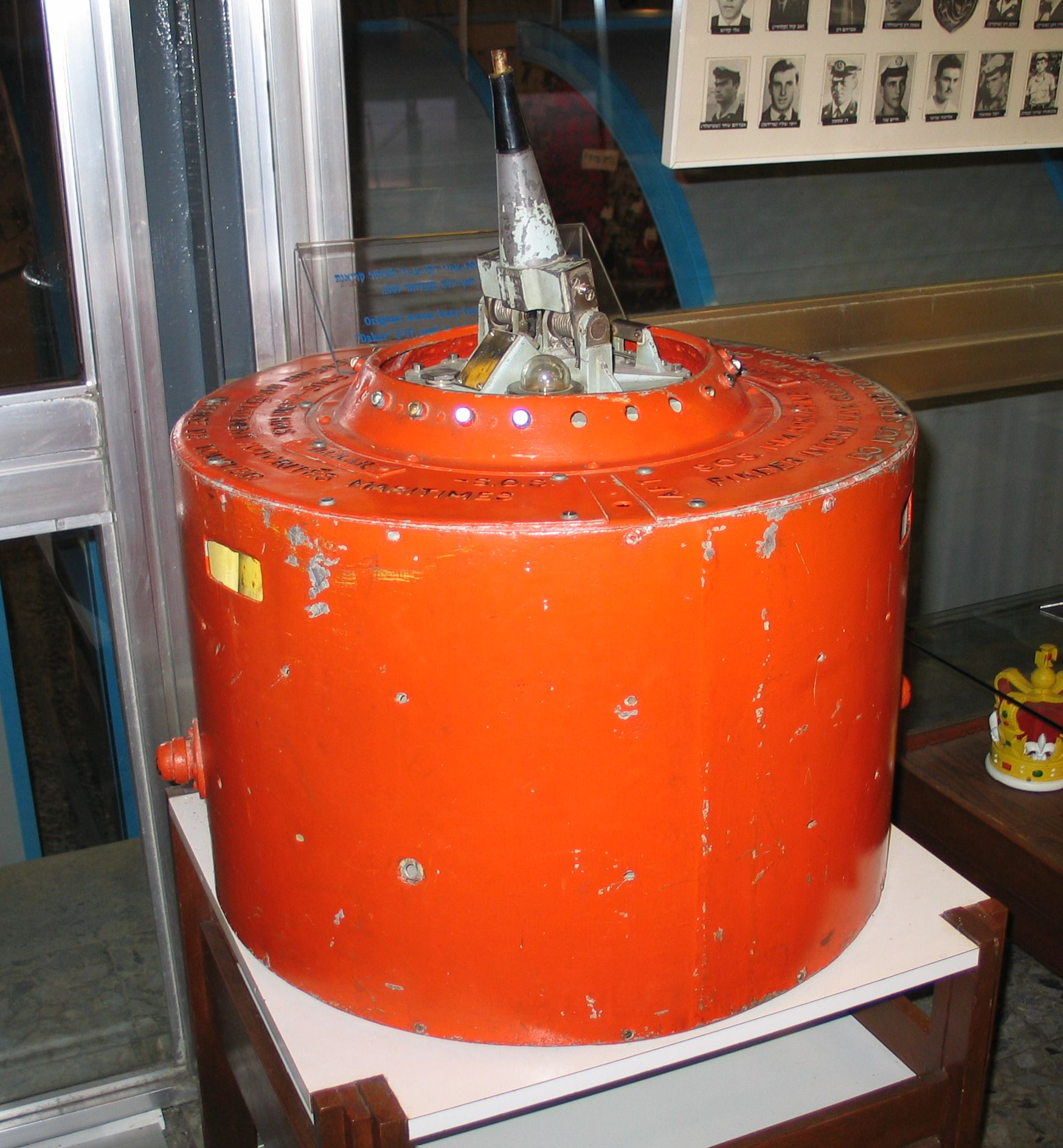
Dakar's emergency buoy in the Clandestine Immigration and Naval Museum in Haifa.

The submarine was purchased by Israel in 1965, along with two of her T-class sisters – Truncheon and Turpin. She was commissioned into the Israeli Sea Corps on 10 November 1967 as INS Dakar (דקר, Grouper) under the command of Lieutenant Commander Ya'acov Ra'anan. British shipyards had modified the boat with an airlock to allow for underwater debarkation of naval commandos.

On 9 January 1968, Dakar departed from Portsmouth for Haifa. She was overloaded with sixty-nine aboard, well in excess of her normal crew of sixty. On the morning of 15 January, Dakar put into Gibraltar, departing at midnight, and proceeded across the Mediterranean Sea underwater using her snorkel mast. Her last position report was at 0610 on 24 January, when she gave a location east of Crete. There were three further routine messages which did not provide a position, the last being at 0002 on 25 January.

Despite an extensive search, no trace was found of the vessel. Her stern emergency marker buoy washed ashore on the coast of Khan Yunis, an Arab town southwest of Gaza, just over a year later, on 9 February 1969.

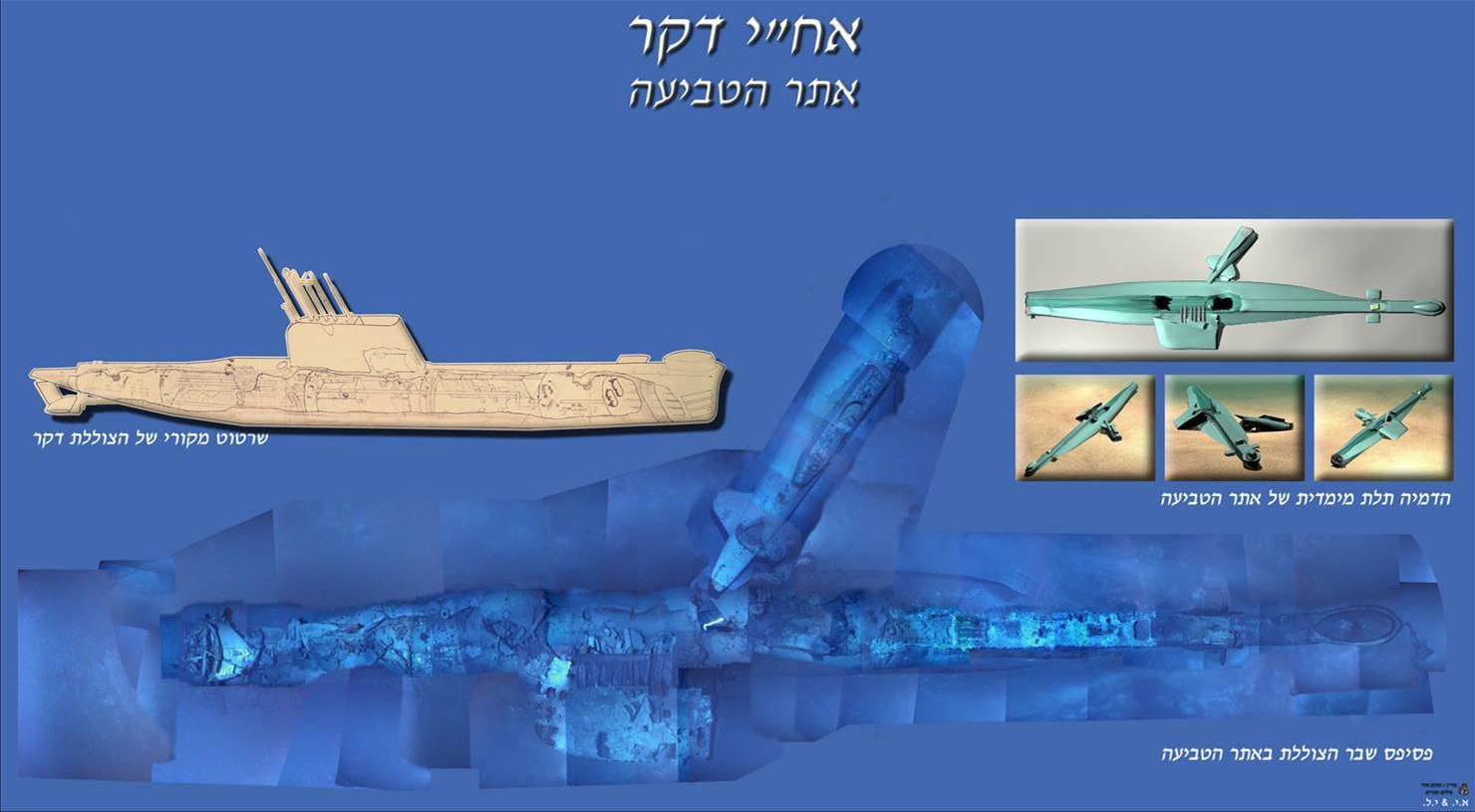
The wreckage of the Dakar

The wreck was finally discovered on 24 May 1999 at a depth of 3,000 meters (9,800 feet). The precise cause of the accident is not known, as no emergency measures appear to have been carried out. It appears that the submarine dived suddenly and rapidly past her maximum depth limit and suffered a catastrophic hull rupture. The emergency buoy was released by the violence of the hull collapse, and washed ashore after drifting for a year.

On 11 October 2000, Dakar's bridge and the forward edge of her sail were raised, and now stand as a memorial in the Clandestine Immigration and Naval Museum in Haifa.
