= HMS Trusty (N45) =

Submarine of the Royal Navy

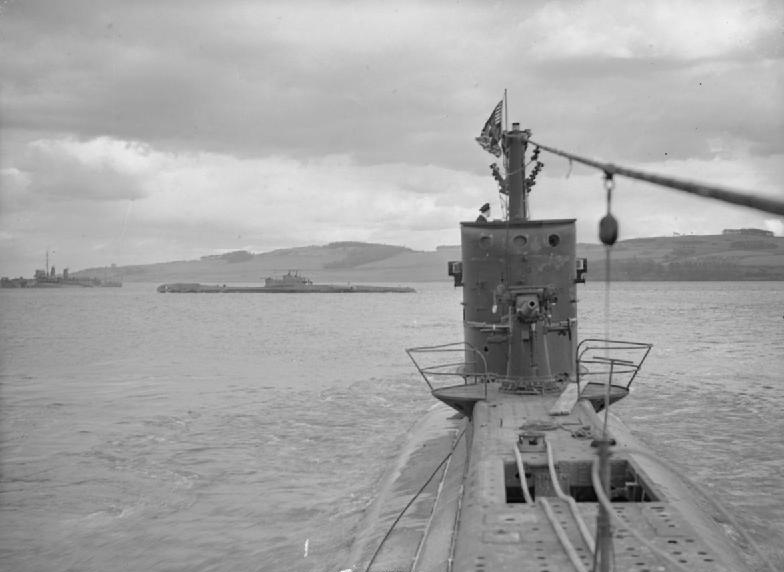
- HMS Trusty (left) passing HMS Sibyl (foreground), as the latter nears port at Dundee.

History

United Kingdom
- Name: HMS Trusty
- Builder: Vickers-Armstrongs, Barrow
- Laid down: 15 March 1940
- Launched: 14 March 1941
- Commissioned: 30 July 1941
- Identification: Pennant number N45
- Fate: Sold for breaking up January 1947
- Badge

General characteristics
- Class & type: British T class submarine
- Displacement: 1,090 tons surfaced; 1,575 tons submerged
- Length: 275 ft (84 m)
- Beam: 26 ft 6 in (8.08 m)
- Draught: 16.3 ft (5.0 m)
- Propulsion: Two shafts; Twin diesel engines 2,500 hp (1.86 MW) each; Twin electric motors 1,450 hp (1.08 MW) each
- Speed: 15.25 knots (28.7 km/h) surfaced; 9 knots (20 km/h) submerged
- Range: 4,500 nautical miles at 11 knots (8,330 km at 20 km/h) surfaced
- Test depth: 300 ft (91 m) max
- Complement: 61
- Armament: 6 internal forward-facing 21-inch (533 mm) torpedo tubes; 2 external forward-facing torpedo tubes; 3 external backward-facing torpedo tubes; 6 reload torpedoes; 1 x 4-inch (102 mm) deck gun; 3 anti-aircraft machine guns

HMS Trusty (N45) was a T-class submarine of the Royal Navy. She was laid down by Vickers-Armstrongs, Barrow and launched in March 1941.

== Career ==
Trusty served in the Mediterranean and in the Pacific Far East. She sank the Italian merchant Eridano in December 1941, and on reassigning to the Pacific, she sank the Japanese merchant cargo ship Toyohashi Maru and damaged the Japanese troop transport Columbia Maru.

She survived the war and was sold to be broken up for scrap in January 1947. She was scrapped at Milford Haven in July 1947.
