= HMS Tireless (P327) =

Submarine of the Royal Navy

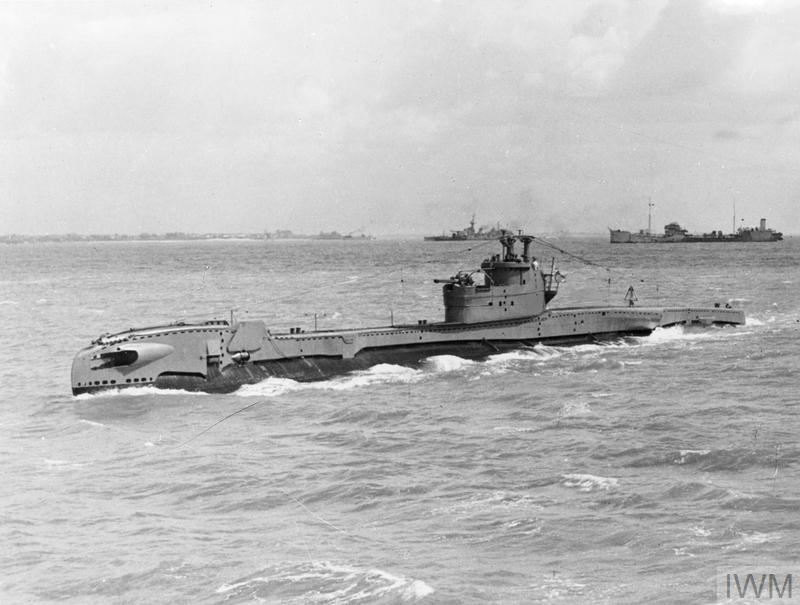
- Tireless at sea in May 1945

History

United Kingdom
- Name: Tireless
- Ordered: 1941
- Builder: Portsmouth Dockyard
- Laid down: 30 October 1941
- Launched: 19 March 1943
- Commissioned: 18 April 1945
- Decommissioned: August 1963
- Identification: Pennant number P327
- Fate: Scrapped, 1968
- Badge

General characteristics
- Class & type: T-class submarine
- Displacement: 1,290 tons surfaced; 1,560 tons submerged
- Length: 276 ft 6 in (84.28 m)
- Beam: 25 ft 6 in (7.77 m)
- Draught: 12 ft 9 in (3.89 m) forward; 14 ft 7 in (4.45 m) aft
- Propulsion: Two shafts; Twin diesel engines 2,500 hp (1.9 MW) each; Twin electric motors 1,450 hp (1.08 MW) each
- Speed: 15.5 knots (28.7 km/h) surfaced; 9 knots (17 km/h) submerged
- Range: 4,500 nautical miles (8,300 km) at 11 knots (20 km/h) surfaced
- Test depth: 300 ft (91 m) max
- Complement: 61
- Armament: 6 internal forward-facing 21 inch (533 mm) torpedo tubes; 2 external forward-facing torpedo tubes; 2 external amidships rear-facing torpedo tubes; 1 external rear-facing torpedo tubes; 6 reload torpedoes; QF 4 inch (100 mm) deck gun; 3 anti-aircraft machine guns

HMS Tireless, a Taciturn- or T-class submarine, was the first ship of the Royal Navy to bear that name. She was authorized under the 1941 War Emergency Programme and her keel was laid down on 30 October 1941 at Portsmouth Dockyard. She was launched on 19 March 1943 and was completed on 18 April 1945.

== Operational Service ==
Commissioned on 18 April 1945, towards the end of the Second World War, Tireless operated in the Far East between late 1945 and 1946 and then in home waters commanded by M L C Crawford. In 1951 she was the first of her class to be streamlined at HM Naval Dockyard, Devonport. In 1953 she took part in the Fleet Review to celebrate the Coronation of Elizabeth II.

By the late 1950s she was again modernised at Chatham Dockyard. In 1959 Tireless was part of the Home Fleet and took part in 'Navy Days' in Portsmouth during that year. Beginning in 1960, the submarine was the first command of future Admiral Sandy Woodward, who led Royal Navy forces in the South Atlantic during the 1982 Falklands War.

She remained in service until August 1963 when she was put on the sale list. She was broken up in 1968.

== Publications ==
- Colledge, J. J.; Warlow, Ben (2006) [1969]. Ships of the Royal Navy: The Complete Record of All Fighting Ships of the Royal Navy from the 15th Century to the Present (3rd Rev ed.). London: Chatham Publishing. ISBN 978-1-86176-281-8. OCLC 67375475.
- Hutchinson, Robert (2001). Jane's Submarines: War Beneath the Waves from 1776 to the Present Day. London: HarperCollins. ISBN 978-0-00-710558-8. OCLC 53783010.
