= HMS Thermopylae =

Submarine of the Royal Navy

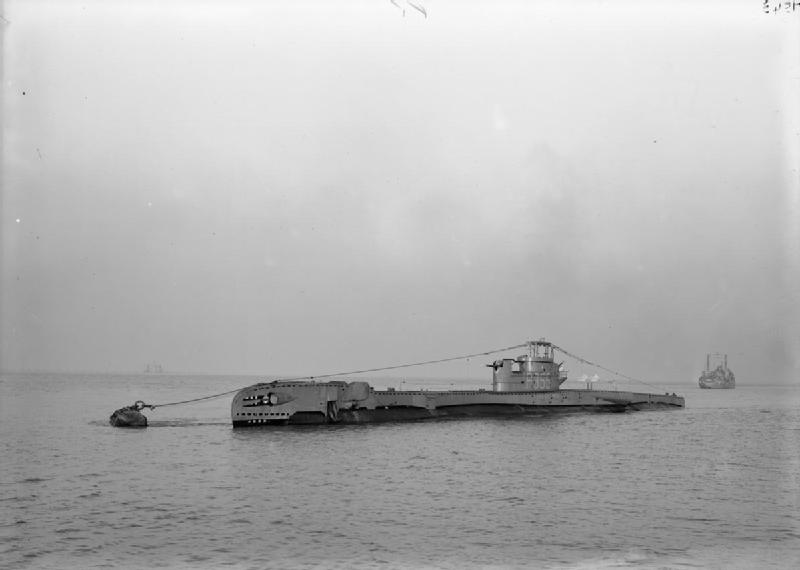
- HMS Thermopylae

History

United Kingdom
- Name: Thermopylae
- Builder: Chatham Dockyard
- Laid down: 26 October 1943
- Launched: 27 June 1945
- Commissioned: 5 December 1945
- Fate: Scrapped, August 1970
- Badge

General characteristics
- Class & type: T class submarine
- Displacement: 1,290 tons surfaced; 1,560 tons submerged
- Length: 276 ft 6 in (84.28 m)
- Beam: 25 ft 6 in (7.77 m)
- Draught: 12 ft 9 in (3.89 m) forward; 14 ft 7 in (4.44 m) aft
- Propulsion: Two shafts; Twin diesel engines 2,500 hp (1.86 MW) each; Twin electric motors 1,450 hp (1.08 MW) each
- Speed: 15.5 knots (28.7 km/h) surfaced; 9 knots (20 km/h) submerged
- Range: 4,500 nautical miles at 11 knots (8,330 km at 20 km/h) surfaced
- Test depth: 300 ft (91 m) max
- Complement: 61
- Armament: 6 internal forward-facing 21 inch (533 mm) torpedo tubes; 2 external forward-facing torpedo tubes; 2 external amidships rear-facing torpedo tubes; 1 external rear-facing torpedo tubes; 6 reload torpedoes; QF 4 inch (100 mm) deck gun; 3 anti aircraft machine guns

HMS Thermopylae (P355) was a T-class submarine in service with the United Kingdom's Royal Navy. So far she has been the only ship of the Royal Navy to bear the name Thermopylae, after the Battle of Thermopylae.

== History ==
Thermopylae was laid down on 26 October 1943 at Chatham Dockyard, and launched on 27 June 1945.

Commissioned after the end of the Second World War, she had a relatively quiet career. She immediately joined the 3rd Flotilla based in the Holy Loch. On 15 January 1950 she ran aground on Stevenson Rock, off Skerryvore, Inner Hebrides. In 1953 she took part in the Fleet Review to celebrate the Coronation of Queen Elizabeth II.

She remained in service until December 1968 when she was put on the sale list. She was broken up at Troon during 1971.

== Publications ==
- Colledge, J. J.; Warlow, Ben (2006) [1969]. Ships of the Royal Navy: The Complete Record of All Fighting Ships of the Royal Navy from the 15th Century to the Present (3rd Rev ed.). London: Chatham Publishing. ISBN 978-1-86176-281-8. OCLC 67375475.
- Hutchinson, Robert (2001). Jane's Submarines: War Beneath the Waves from 1776 to the Present Day. London: HarperCollins. ISBN 978-0-00-710558-8. OCLC 53783010.
