= HMS Token =

Submarine of the Royal Navy

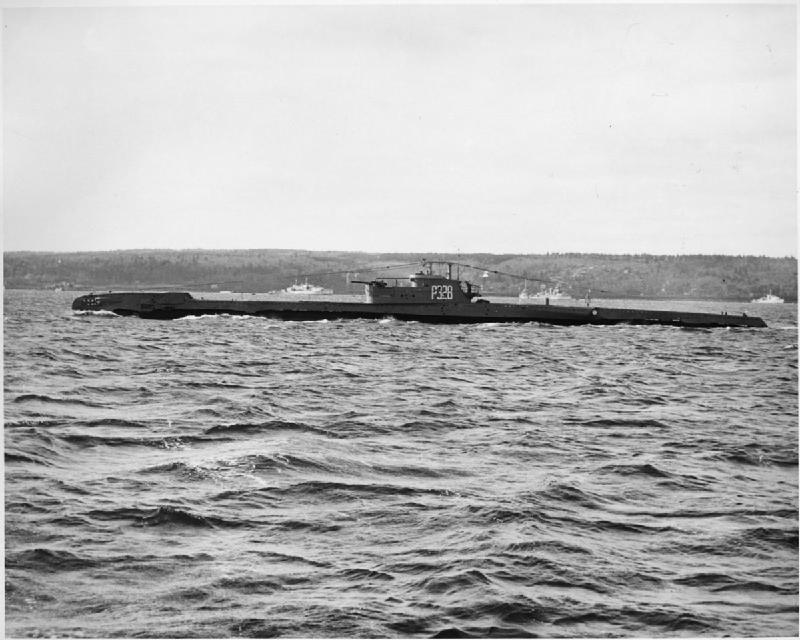
- HMS Token in October 1946

History

United Kingdom
- Name: Token
- Builder: Portsmouth Dockyard
- Laid down: 6 November 1941
- Launched: 19 March 1943
- Commissioned: 15 December 1945
- Identification: Pennant number P328
- Fate: Scrapped 1970
- Badge

General characteristics
- Class & type: British T-class submarine
- Displacement: 1,290 tons surfaced; 1,560 tons submerged
- Length: 276 ft 6 in (84.28 m)
- Beam: 25 ft 6 in (7.77 m)
- Draught: 12 ft 9 in (3.89 m) forward; 14 ft 7 in (4.45 m) aft
- Propulsion: Two shafts; Twin diesel engines 2,500 hp (1.86 MW) each; Twin electric motors 1,450 hp (1.08 MW) each
- Speed: 15.5 knots (28.7 km/h) surfaced; nine knots (20 km/h) submerged
- Range: 4,500 nautical miles at 11 knots (8,330 km at 20 km/h) surfaced
- Test depth: 300 ft (91 m) max
- Complement: 61
- Armament: Six internal forward-facing 21 inch (533 mm) torpedo tubes; two external forward-facing torpedo tubes; two external amidships rear-facing torpedo tubes; one external rear-facing torpedo tubes; six reload torpedoes; QF 4 inch (100 mm) deck gun; three anti-aircraft machine guns

HMS Token was a British submarine of the third group of the T class. She was built as P328 at Portsmouth Dockyard, and launched on 19 March 1943. So far she has been the only ship of the Royal Navy to bear the name Token.

== Operational service ==
Commissioned into service after the end of the Second World War, on 3 September 1945, she had a relatively peaceful career with the Navy. In 1953 she took part in the Fleet Review to celebrate the Coronation of Queen Elizabeth II.

She was modernised at Devonport Dockyard in 1955. Her career was spent on the Home Station and in the Mediterranean, re-fitting at Malta. In 1965 she was part of the 1st Submarine Squadron in Portsmouth, providing basic training to submarines crews. In that year she took part in Portsmouth 'Navy Days'. On 20 August 1967, Token was on exercise off the West coast of Scotland when she took the Danish merchant ship Opnor, which was adrift after her engines had broken down, under tow, preventing the merchant ship from drifting onto a reef.

She was finally scrapped at Cairn Ryan in March 1970.
