= British T-class submarine =

Class of diesel-electric submarines

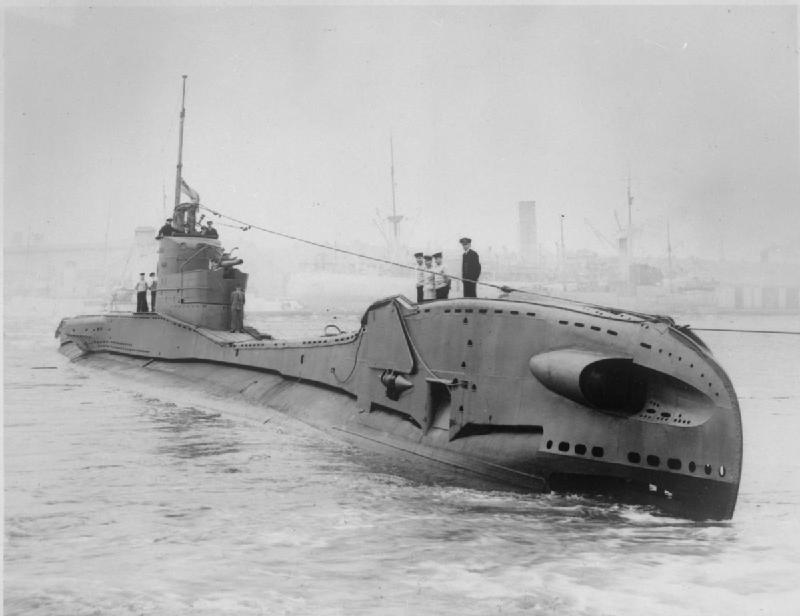
- HMS Thorn

Class overview
- Name: T class
- Operators: Royal Navy; Royal Netherlands Navy; Israeli Navy
- Preceded by: Grampus class
- Succeeded by: U class
- Completed: 53

General characteristics
- Type: Submarine
- Displacement: 1,290 long tons (1,310 t) surfaced; 1,560 long tons (1,590 t) submerged
- Length: 276 ft 6 in (84.28 m)
- Beam: 25 ft 6 in (7.77 m)
- Draught: 12 ft 9 in (3.89 m) forward; 14 ft 7 in (4.45 m) aft
- Propulsion: Twin diesel engines, 1,250 hp (930 kW) each; Twin electric motors, 1,450 hp (1,080 kW) each; Two shafts
- Speed: 15.5 knots (28.7 km/h; 17.8 mph) surfaced; 9 knots (17 km/h; 10 mph) submerged
- Range: 8,000 nmi (15,000 km; 9,200 mi) at 10 kn (19 km/h; 12 mph) surfaced with 131 tons of fuel
- Complement: 48
- Armament: 6 × bow torpedo tubes; 4 × external torpedo tubes; 16 torpedoes; 1 QF 4-inch (100 mm) deck gun

The Royal Navy's T class (or Triton class) of diesel-electric submarines was designed in the 1930s to replace the O, P, and R classes. Fifty-three members of the class were built just before and during the Second World War, where they played a major role in the Royal Navy's submarine operations. Four boats in service with the Royal Netherlands Navy were known as the Zwaardvisch class.

At the start of the Second World War the T class was, with the British S and U class, Dutch O 21 class and German Type VII, one of the most advanced submarine classes in service.

In the decade following the war, the oldest surviving boats were scrapped and the remainder converted to anti-submarine vessels to counter the growing Soviet submarine threat. The Royal Navy disposed of its last operational boat in 1969, although it retained one permanently moored as a static training submarine until 1974. The last surviving boat, serving in the Israel Sea Corps, was scrapped in 1977.

== Development ==
The design of what was to become the T class began in 1934 to create a replacement for the first British postwar submarines, the O, P and R classes. These similar classes of submarines had proved unsatisfactory, being mechanically unreliable, large, slow and over-complicated. The Washington Naval Treaty of 1922 required that these submarines be retired after 13 years of service. Oberon would have to be paid off in August 1940 (the outbreak of war in 1939 kept her in service).

The 1930 London Naval Treaty restricted the British submarine fleet to a total tonnage of 52,700 long tons (53,500 t), a maximum standard surfaced displacement of 2,000 long tons (2,000 t) for any boat, and maximum gun armament of 5.1 in (130 mm). The Americans had proposed a limit of 1,200 long tons (1,200 t) for the 1935 London Disarmament Conference, but this was rejected by the Admiralty since it would exclude the Grampus-class mine-laying submarines. The Admiralty proposed retaining the limit of 2,000 long tons (2,000 t), hoping that the rival naval powers would build fewer but larger submarines as a matter of national pride, which would be easier to hunt than numerous smaller submarines. The National Government of Stanley Baldwin had also proposed banning the submarine altogether or imposing an individual displacement limit of 250 long tons (250 t) but the Admiralty correctly predicted that the other nations would not accept such strict limitations and continued with the design of what was then known as the "Repeat P" or "Replace P" class of submarines.

The O, P, and R classes had been designed with the Pacific in mind as a counter to the Imperial Japanese Navy. In the absence of a battle fleet, the submarines would be the primary offensive weapon against the Japanese. The replacement "Repeat P" class had to have a similar endurance but be easier to maintain, as well as appreciably smaller in expectation of future treaty restrictions. In drawing up the requirements for the British submarine fleet, 20 of these new submarines were estimated to be required for a total tonnage of 20,000 tons. Rear Admiral (Submarines), Noel Laurence, one of the most distinguished British submariners of the First World War, also pushed for a strong torpedo armament. He was convinced that a British submarine facing a powerful Japanese surface force would have difficulty penetrating the destroyer screen, and only a large torpedo salvo would be able to ensure the required hits at longer ranges, if necessary using only ASDIC data for a firing solution.

On 27 February 1934, the Director of Naval Construction (DNC), Sir Arthur Johns, was asked to investigate designs for a 1,000 long tons (1,000 t) displacement patrol submarine. The DNC designed (DNC 'A' and DNC 'B'), forming the basis of the November 1934 preliminary staff requirement. These designs called for an armament of six internal 21-inch (530 mm) torpedo tubes, two external tubes, and one 3-inch (76 mm) (or 4 in, 100 mm, if stability permitted) gun, and a patrol capability of 4,000 nautical miles (7,400 km; 4,600 mi) at 11 knots (20 km/h; 13 mph) plus sufficient fuel for a 28-day patrol, corresponding to a range of 5,500 nmi (10,200 km; 6,300 mi) at 11 knots (20 km/h; 13 mph). Submerged endurance was to be 15 hours at 2 knots (3.7 km/h; 2.3 mph) or eight hours at 5 knots (9.3 km/h; 5.8 mph). A maximum submerged speed of 9 knots (17 km/h; 10 mph), surfaced speed of 15 knots (28 km/h; 17 mph) and diving depth of 300 feet (91 m) were specified. An alternative proposal by Rear Admiral Laurence suggested using a double hull for greater survivability under depth charge attack but his proposal was rejected by the DNC in favour of a more conventional single hull with saddle tanks.

In 1935, the "Repeat P" design was modified to reduce the displacement to 1,000 long tons (1,000 t) in compliance with treaty limitations. Design 'C' had to sacrifice machinery space, reducing the surfaced speed to only 14.5 kn (26.9 km/h; 16.7 mph) and the surfaced endurance to 8,600 nmi (15,900 km; 9,900 mi) at 8 knots (15 km/h; 9.2 mph). The design was again modified with Design 'D', eliminating fuel stowage in external tanks (which had proved prone to leakage on the O, P, and R classes) in favor of stowage within the pressure hull. It proved impossible to reduce the displacement to 1,000 long tons (1,000 t) without unacceptable reductions to endurance and the displacement was allowed to rise to 1,075 long tons (1,092 t).

After a slight reduction in the length and the fresh water diving requirement of the design, the final design was agreed upon in May 1935. On 24 June 1935, the designation "Repeat P" was formally dropped by the Admiralty, and it was decided that the submarines would all bear names beginning with the letter T. Finally, on 3 September 1935, the name Triton was selected for the lead ship of the class. Final approval for the design was given by the Admiralty Board on 13 February 1936. The Vickers, Cammell Laird, and Scotts shipbuilding companies were invited to submit tenders on 5 December 1935 and on 5 March 1936, the contract for Triton was awarded to Vickers Armstrong under the 1935 Programme.

== Design ==
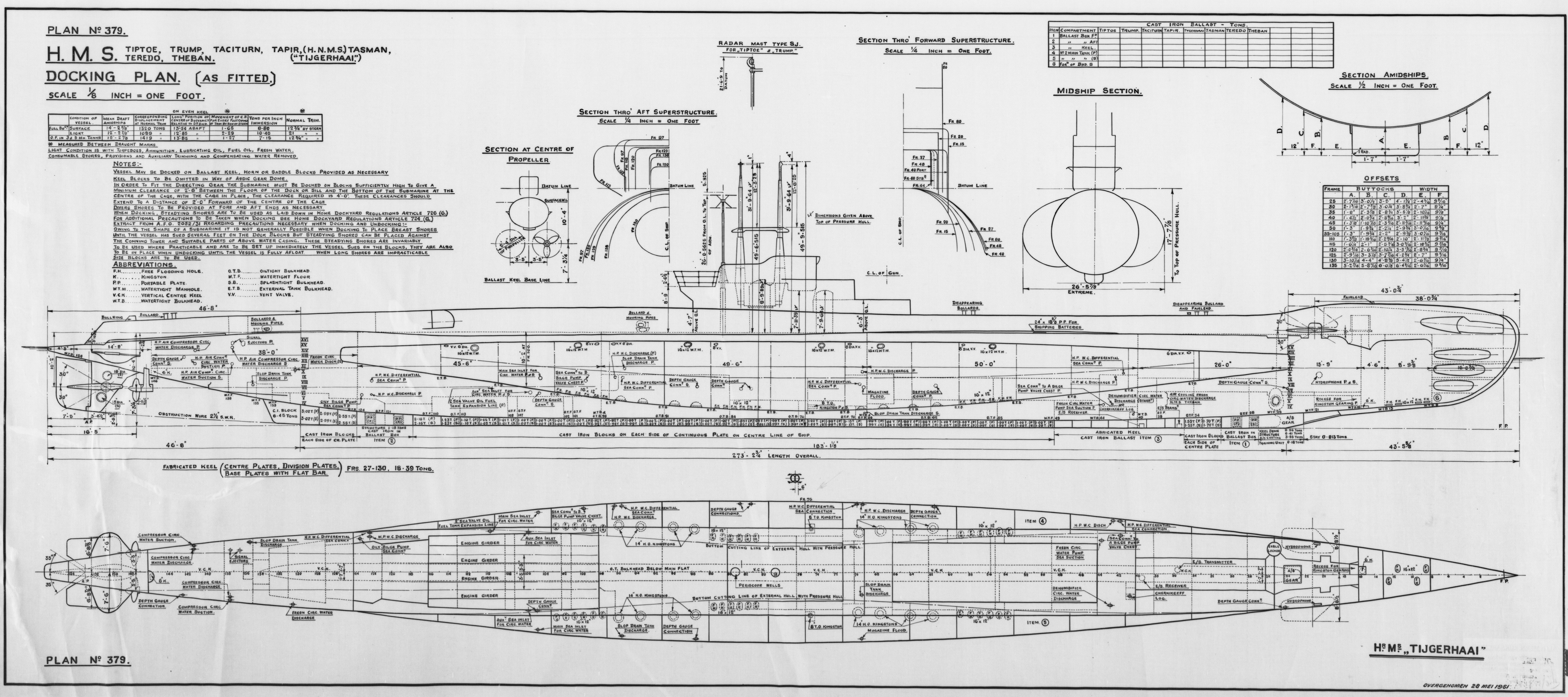
Drawing of the docking plans for late Tiptoe, Trump, Taciturn, Tapir, Teredo, Theban and Tijgerhaai

The design of the T-class submarines was dictated by the requirements of an extremely large forward torpedo salvo capability and long patrol endurance for operations in the Pacific against Japanese warships, as well as the need to comply with treaty restrictions. These extremely challenging requirements led to many compromises in the design. Operational experience before and during the war led to many alterations and modifications to the class, and individual boats often differed noticeably from each other.

=== Hull and superstructure ===
To accommodate the external forward torpedo tubes, most of the T class had distinctive bulbous bows. The original bow shape of the Group One boats adversely affected the speed while surfaced and two of the Group One boats had the external bow tubes omitted during refitting (Triumph and Thunderbolt, formerly Thetis), resulting in a finer bow shape. Group Two boats had the external bow tubes moved further back, allowing for a finer bow shape that ended the speed loss. They also had two of the external torpedo tubes reversed to face aft along with an additional rear torpedo tube, resulting in a characteristic hump. The final Group Three boats had the bows further fined and the casing around the conning tower and rear-facing torpedo tubes flattened, resulting in a smoother profile.

Pre-war T-class submarines were of riveted construction. The riveted hull proved remarkably strong, with many of the T-class boats exceeding the rated diving depth of 300 ft (91 m) during combat. Tetrarch survived a dive to 400 ft (122 m) on 23 April 1940. Welding in the hull construction was officially sanctioned by the Admiralty, after much hesitation, in July 1942 for the pressure hulls of the Group Three boats, later extended to the entire hull. Welded hulls were considerably stronger, allowing a diving depth of 350 ft (107 m), with additional fuel carried in external ballast tanks for increased endurance. Partly welded Group Three boats had riveted external ballast tanks; these were welded up before being sent to the Far East to prevent telltale oil leaks betraying the submarine's presence. The estimated crush depth was 626 ft (191 m).

The lead ship, Triton, was completed with a very high open bridge, which was very draughty. The following Group One boats had a slightly different bridge shape but these too were exposed, particularly problematical in heavy weather. Some of the Group One boats were fitted with closed cab-type bridges to resolve this problem; this became standard in the Group Two boats, but wartime experience found that the greater visibility from the open bridges was more important in action than the better habitability of the cabs, and the final Group Three boats reverted to the open bridge.

T-class boats had eleven main (ballast) tanks, two auxiliary tanks for adjusting trim, five compensating tanks for adjusting to changes in water density and the displacement of the submarine as stores were used up, and the bow Q tank used for quick dives or rapid changes in depth. Two of the main tanks were converted into fuel tanks in the Group Three boats to increase endurance for operations in the Far East. Diving time from a 50 per cent buoyancy condition was good by British submarine standards at 30 seconds. The Group Two and Three boats had the fuel capacity increased on many boats to 230 long tons (230 t), giving a surfaced range of 11,000 nmi (20,000 km; 13,000 mi) at 10 kn (19 km/h; 12 mph).

=== Propulsion ===
The T-class boats used a variety of diesel engines depending on where they were built. Vickers-built boats used Vickers engines, while those from the Royal Dockyards used Admiralty diesel engines; Cammell Laird boats used Sulzer engines, while the pre-war Scotts boats had German MAN supercharged diesel engines. These engines drove two shafts, each capable of 1,250 brake horsepower (930 kW) for a top surfaced speed of about 15 knots (28 km/h; 17 mph). The lead boat Triton achieved 16.29 knots (30.17 km/h; 18.75 mph) on her first-of-class trials; this speed was never equalled by any of the other T-class boats, which usually managed about 14–15 knots (26–28 km/h; 16–17 mph).

The Vickers 6-cylinder 4-stroke 1,250 bhp (930 kW) injection diesel engines fitted to the majority of the T class proved to be very reliable, although less advanced than the diesels used by the German U-boats. The engine could continue running even if one cylinder failed, by disconnecting the cylinder from the crankshaft. The 12 boats completed at the Royal Dockyards fitted with Admiralty diesel engines proved equally reliable although the engines were somewhat more complicated than the Vickers ones.

The MAN diesels proved to be rather troublesome; they were built under license, and once the Second World War broke out in 1939, technical support from the German MAN company stopped. By 1943, only two of the T-class boats with MAN engines were left (Tuna and Tribune), and they were relegated to training. Even when the Royal Navy in the Far East was facing a critical submarine shortage in March 1944, Tuna was not sent there due to her untrustworthy engines. The Cammell Laird Sulzer 2-stroke engines received mixed reviews; some boats, including Thrasher and Thorn, were perfectly satisfactory, while the engines caused problems on others. They were insufficiently engineered for running at full speed, and the cylinder rings and blocks tended to crack.

Submerged propulsion was provided by a 336-cell battery driving two 1,450 bhp (1,080 kW) Laurence Scott electric motors. These provided an endurance of 48 hours at 2.5 knots (4.6 km/h; 2.9 mph), or only one hour at the maximum submerged speed of 9 knots (17 km/h; 10 mph). The battery proved vulnerable to shock damage from depth charge attacks. This contributed to the loss of Tempest in 1942, which sustained depth charge damage from the Italian torpedo boat Circe that ruptured her battery tank and filled the submarine with chlorine gas, forcing her to surface and eventually surrender. This problem was resolved by strengthening the battery compartment and fitting rubber shock absorbers. In contrast to Tempest, the modified Terrapin survived a prolonged depth charge attack from Japanese escort vessels which rendered her hull a constructive total loss but caused no damage to her battery cells.

=== Weaponry ===
==== Torpedoes ====
It was expected from British work on ASDIC sonar that other nations would develop something similar for submarine detection. In the face of expected enemy anti-submarine measures any submarine attack would probably have to be made at long range without the aid of the periscope, using only ASDIC. To counter the resulting inaccuracy, a large salvo of at least eight torpedoes would be needed. British operational planning at the time also assumed that international treaties would prevent unrestricted submarine warfare, so that the main purpose of the submarine would be to attack dangerous enemy warships, often giving a commander only one chance to attack, so a large salvo was essential. The ten-torpedo salvo of the pre-war T-class boats was the largest ever fitted to any operational submarine.

All T-class submarines had six internal 21-inch (533 mm) torpedo tubes in the bow. These were fitted with bow shutters on early Group One boats to reduce underwater drag; the benefits proved to be minimal and the shutters were prone to jamming from flotsam, so the idea was dropped in favour of reshaping the torpedo tube orifices for minimal drag. After the loss of Thetis due to the unintentional opening of the rear door of a torpedo tube while its bow cap was open, a special safety clip known as the "Thetis clip" was introduced to prevent the rear torpedo tube door from being opened by more than a fraction if the bow cap was not in place. Each T-class boat carried six reload torpedoes for the internal tubes in the torpedo stowage compartment. Reloading was manual, although a power-loading system was experimented with on Triumph in 1939 based on one developed on Grampus. This system proved to be underpowered, and the pressures of wartime production led to development being curtailed.

The internal torpedo tubes were complemented by four forward-facing external ("E-type") 21-inch torpedo tubes on Group One T-class boats; external tubes were used to avoid compromising the structural integrity of the pressure hull with too many openings. These tubes could not be reloaded from within the submarine, and it was also not possible to conduct maintenance on or withdraw the torpedo once it was loaded into the external tube. These tubes were angled downwards at a 5° bow angle to ease operations, except on the lead boat Triton. Two of these external tubes were located in the bow, and another two located amidships at the base of the conning tower. Unlike the internal tubes, the bow caps for the external tubes had to be operated manually, requiring considerable effort. The tubes were also vulnerable to damage. Two of the T-class boats had their bow external tubes omitted during reconstruction: Thunderbolt (ex-Thetis) and Triumph.

Prior to the outbreak of war, there had been much debate over the introduction of stern torpedo tubes on British submarines. The effectiveness of a two-torpedo stern salvo was considered to be doubtful and these tubes would take up valuable space on the submarine. Experience soon led to complaints from British submarine commanders including Commander Anthony Miers (Torbay) about the lack of stern torpedo tubes. Consequently, eight of the Group One boats, Taku, Thunderbolt, Tigris, Torbay, Tribune, Trident, Truant, and Tuna, were retrofitted with an eleventh external torpedo tube facing rearwards, which became standard on boats starting from Group. On Group Two boats, the amidships torpedo tubes were also moved aft of the conning tower and pointed rearwards. Initially these were angled at 10° off the centerline, but this created an area of flat casing that made maintaining depth difficult and for the last two Group Two boats, Traveller and Trooper, and all of the Group Three boats, the angle was reduced to 7°.

The primary torpedo used by the T-class submarines was the 21-inch Mark VIII torpedo, principally the Mark VIII** variant. This torpedo weighed 1,566 kg (3,452 lb) with a 365 kg (805 lb) Torpex warhead and used a Brotherhood burner-cycle engine for a range of 4,570 m (5,000 yd) at 45.5 kn (84.3 km/h; 52.4 mph) or 6,400 m (7,000 yd) at 41 kn (76 km/h; 47 mph). It had a greater propulsive efficiency than any contemporary torpedo of a similar size, but shortages of the Mark VIII early in the war led to some submarines using the older Mark IV. The Mark VIII was primarily fitted with a contact pistol which detonated the torpedo upon impact. A non-contact magnetic pistol known as the CCR (Compensated Coil Rod) was also developed and used during the war. Like the magnetic pistols developed by many other countries, the CCR gave endless trouble and was eventually withdrawn. Due to development problems with British postwar torpedoes, the Mark VIII remained the standard torpedo used by all Royal Navy submarines, including the T class, until the Mark 23 wire-guided torpedo was introduced in 1971.

==== Deck guns ====
All T-class submarines, as built, were fitted with one 4-inch (102 mm) deck gun as a weapon of surprise and self-defence. This was either the 4-inch QF Mark XII or XXII (both interchangeable) on an S1 mounting. The mounting was located above the casing and forward of the conning tower, with a characteristic breastwork that rotated with the gun to provide room for the crew to operate the gun. No armour or overhead protection for the 4-inch gun crew was provided as built due to weight restrictions, except on Tabard, Talent, and Teredo. Many other T-class boats received improvised gun shields manufactured by depot ships in the Far East, providing some degree of protection. The gun had a crew of five, and T-class submarines were initially supplied with 100 rounds of ammunition, which proved insufficient and was soon increased; by the end of the war, T boats would often carry more gun ammunition instead of reload torpedoes.

The standard anti-aircraft armament carried by T-class submarines was three .303-inch machine guns. These were initially Lewis guns, replaced from 1941 onwards by the better Vickers gas-operated (VGO) machine gun. The Vickers was sometimes substituted by the Bren gun if the Army could spare supplies. Later, most T-class boats were retrofitted or completed with the ubiquitous 20 mm Oerlikon, located aft of the conning tower. Most T-class boats were fitted with only one, but Tantivy carried two 20 mm cannon side by side on pedestal mountings, while Tireless was completed with a twin Oerlikon Mark 12A mounting. The crew of Terrapin was able to acquire a .50 inch Browning air-cooled machine gun on their own initiative, but this weapon was eventually dropped because it had a too powerful recoil for the conning tower's structure that was made of brass instead of steel to prevent interference with the magnetic compass.

== Service history ==
=== Prewar ===
The lead boat of the class, Triton, was commissioned on 9 November 1938. She would be joined by another 14 T-class submarines ordered under the prewar 1936–1938 Programmes. The unfortunate loss of Thetis on 1 June 1939 along with 99 of the men on board during her trials led to modification of the Royal Navy's submarine escape procedures. Triton was the only member of the class to undergo full trials, for the outbreak of war meant that the Royal Navy could not afford this luxury at a time when modern submarines were desperately needed. When war broke out on 1 September 1939, there were only three T-class boats in service: Triton, Triumph and Thistle.

=== Second World War ===
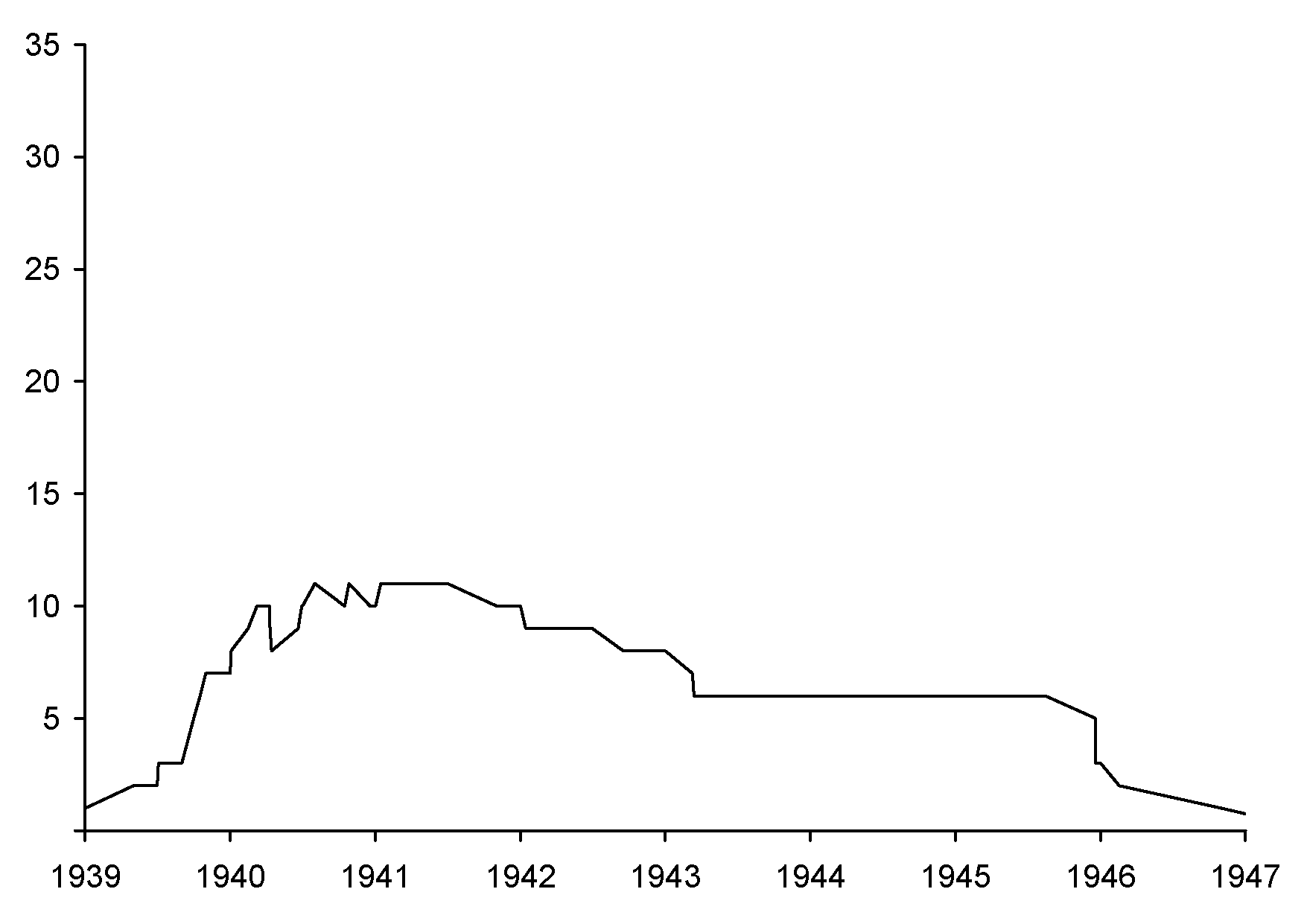
Number of British T-class submarines in service by year in World War II

As the Royal Navy's standard ocean patrol submarine, the T-class submarines were heavily engaged during World War II, from the North Sea to the Mediterranean, and finally the Far East.

British submarine campaign against Germany during the early stages of the war were very different from the German submarine campaigns in the Atlantic and the later American submarine campaign in the Pacific. Germany did not depend on heavy mercantile traffic in the way Britain was dependent on overseas trade, so there were no unprotected convoys or mercantile traffic for the British submarines to attack. Most German mercantile traffic was confined to the North Sea, which was heavily mined. Consequently, British submarines had to undertake long, often fruitless patrols in these confined, dangerous waters.

==== Norway ====
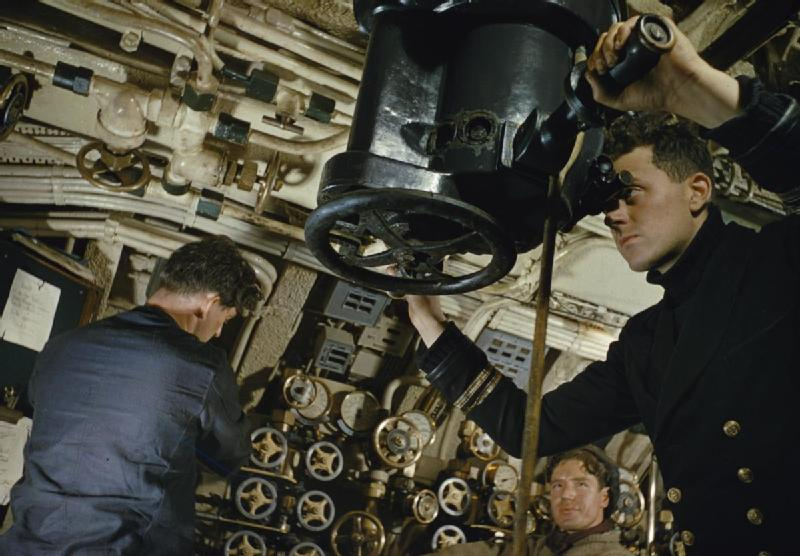
On board HMS Tribune in 1942

On 10 September 1939, nine days after the war began, Triton sighted another submarine while on patrol off the coast of Norway. When the submarine failed to respond to challenges, she fired two torpedoes from the external bow tubes, hitting the submarine with one and sinking it. Unfortunately, this submarine turned out to be HMS Oxley, the first British submarine to be lost during the war, with only two of her crew surviving the attack. The crew of the Triton was exonerated by a subsequent inquiry, but it was an inauspicious start to the war for the T-class submarine fleet. Triumph was unfortunate enough to run into a mine on 26 December 1939 that blew off her bow section, but miraculously survived and was able to return to Rosyth for extensive repairs.

With the start of the Norwegian Campaign in April 1940, increased Kriegsmarine traffic in support of the German invasion led to more action for the T-class submarines based in the North Sea. On 8 April 1940, Triton encountered the German cruisers Blücher and Lützow, but a full salvo of ten torpedoes missed. Two days later, she had more success after reloading, sinking three ships in a German convoy with six torpedoes. Truant also achieved a notable success, hitting and disabling the cruiser Karlsruhe, which had to be finished off by an escorting torpedo boat. Two T-class boats were lost during the Norwegian campaign: Thistle (torpedoed by U-4 on 10 April 1940) and Tarpon (depth-charged by the Q-ship Schiff 40/Schürbek on 14 April 1940).

==== Bay of Biscay ====
The British began establishing submarine patrols in the strategic Bay of Biscay, known as the 'Iron Ring', in July 1940 after the fall of France and the German occupation of the French Atlantic ports. These became much more important once heavy German warships such as Scharnhorst, Gneisenau, and Prinz Eugen arrived there in 1941.

On 15 December 1940, Thunderbolt torpedoed the Italian submarine Capitano Tarantini, the first of eventually 14 Axis submarines to fall victim to T-class submarines. On 5 July 1941, Tigris accounted for another Italian submarine, the Michele Bianchi. The 'Iron Ring' patrols were discontinued after the infamous Channel Dash in February 1942.

==== Mediterranean ====
T-class submarines began to operate in the Mediterranean from September 1940 onwards. This was the theatre in which the T class were most heavily engaged in operations and correspondingly suffered proportionately heavy losses.

Operations in the Mediterranean posed several substantial challenges for British submarines, and the T class in particular. Firstly, the Italian Regia Marina, almost uniquely among the Axis navies, had devoted a substantial amount of resources and training to anti-submarine warfare. Equipped with their own version of sonar, the ecogoniometro (ECG), possessing excellent escort vessels, and making extensive use of mines, the Italians were the most successful of the Axis powers at destroying Allied submarines.

The Mediterranean Sea was also characterised by calm, shallow, and unusually clear waters compared to the North Atlantic. Submarines could often be spotted from the air even when submerged, and the shallow waters made deep diving to escape attack difficult or impossible. Having been designed for operations in the Far East, the T boats were substantially larger and more vulnerable to detection and mines than the standard German Type VII U-boat. However, the large sizes of the T-class boats gave them substantially greater endurance and range than the smaller standard S and U classes of Royal Navy submarines. This allowed them to operate successfully from the British bases at Alexandria and Gibraltar, a long way from Axis waters.

The British submarine campaign in the Mediterranean was primarily targeted at Axis convoys from Italy to North Africa supplying the Italian army and German Afrika Korps fighting the British Commonwealth forces in North Africa. Axis air power made it extremely hazardous to use surface warships in this role, and until the Allies were able to establish air superiority over Malta the burden of the anti-shipping campaign fell on the submarines based in the Mediterranean. British submarines did not operate surfaced during the day in the Mediterranean as it was far too hazardous due to Axis air power, surfacing to recharge only at night. By contrast, Axis submarines tended to operate surfaced in broad daylight, a habit described by British submariners as 'truly reprehensible'. T-class submarines thus proved especially successful against Axis submarines in the theatre, accounting for five Italian submarines for no losses to British submarines.

Thirteen T-class submarines were lost during the Mediterranean campaign, including all but two of the Group Two boats. Over half of these (seven) were lost to Axis minefields. However, they played a crucial role in denying supplies to the Axis forces in North Africa, which helped Allied victory in that theatre. For example, Turbulent accounted for over 90,000 tons of Axis shipping.

Four Victoria Crosses (VCs) were awarded to T-class submarine crews during the Mediterranean campaign. One, awarded to J. W. Linton, captain of Turbulent, was unusual in that it was awarded for sustained effort and not for outstanding bravery in a single action. The other two were awarded to two crew members of Thrasher, T. W. Gould and P. S. W. Roberts, who removed two unexploded anti-submarine bombs stuck in the submarine's gun casing. Thrasher remains the only British submarine in history to have had more than one VC recipient among her crew. The last VC was awarded to A. Miers, captain of Torbay, for a daring raid penetrating into Corfu harbour.

=== Far East and Indian Ocean ===
Despite the class being built with operations against the Japanese in mind, there were no operational British submarines of any class in the theatre at the time of the Japanese attack. Truant and Trusty were ordered to the area with haste, but arrived just in time for Singapore to fall. Following the allied retreat they were based in Ceylon with the surviving Dutch submarines. They were sortied to intercept the expected Japanese route for the Indian Ocean Raid, and Truant did sink two Imperial Japanese Army transports, but the Kido Butai did not pass that way.

This small flotilla was all that were available until late 1943 when new S and T-class boats started to arrive. These new arrivals had modifications for better performance in the warmer climates and were better suited for offensive operations. Given Japan's need to defend against the American advance, high value targets were limited, though there were some notable successes: Tally-Ho sank the Kuma and the German-manned UIT-23, Taurus sank the Japanese submarine I-34, Telemachus the Japanese submarine I-166 and Trenchant the German submarine U-859 and Japanese heavy cruiser Ashigara. Tantalus became the only British ship to sight Japanese capital units when she spotted the Japanese battleships Ise and Hyūga during Operation Kita, but was unable to attack.

Though targets of opportunity were poor compared to where US submarines were operating, the class performed reasonably well, sinking numerous merchant/cargo ships and smaller Japanese warships and many coasters and small vessels. They proved better suited for Far Eastern operations than the smaller S class, having greater crew comfort and range.

== Postwar modification and service ==
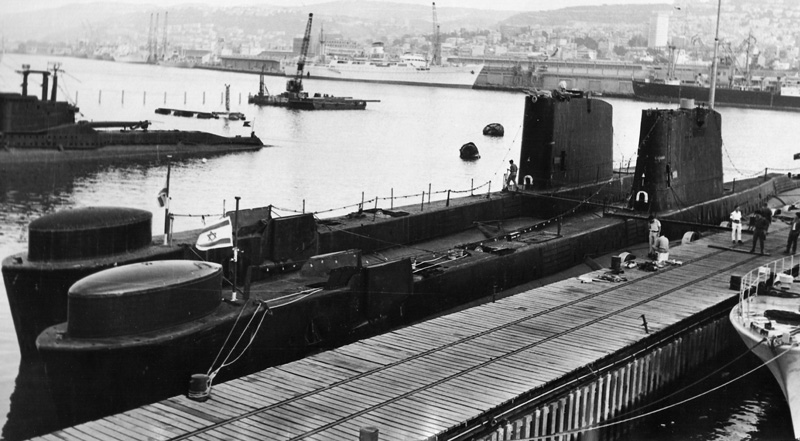
INS Leviathan (formerly HMS Turpin) and INS Dolphin (formerly HMS Truncheon) at Haifa port, in 1968.

After the war, all surviving Group One and Two boats were scrapped, but the more recent Group Three boats were retained and snorts added. At this point the Allies had come into possession of the German Type XXI submarine with much superior underwater speed and endurance, which was expected to be the model for a future Soviet submarine fleet. The Royal Navy abandoned tests on the Type XXI boats they had acquired postwar after one of the boats suffered a battery fire. Further tests of were carried out using Tradewind, modified in July 1945 – September 1946 to become an acoustic trials submarine, with external tubes and guns removed, the bridge faired, the hull streamlined and some internal torpedo tubes blanked over, and also the S-class Scotsman which was also streamlined and fitted with advanced motors and batteries to test high-speed underwater propulsion.

In January 1948, it was formally acknowledged that the main operational function of the British submarine fleet would now be to intercept Soviet submarines slipping out of their bases in Northern Russia to attack British and Allied merchant vessels. The following April, the Assistant Chief of Naval Staff, Rear-Admiral Geoffrey Oliver, circulated a paper in which he proposed that British submarines take a more offensive role in case of war by attacking Soviet submarines off the Northern Russian coast and mining the waters in the area. With the dramatically reduced surface fleet following the end of the Second World War, he commented that this was one of the few methods the Royal Navy had for "getting to the enemy on his home ground." It was also important for the Royal Navy to have adequate modern submarines for surface fleet units to be able to train in up-to-date anti-submarine warfare tactics.

Starting in 1948, eight newer all-welded boats underwent extensive "Super-T" conversion at Chatham Dockyard. The modifications included the removal of deck guns and the replacement of the conning tower with a "fin", a smooth-surfaced and far more symmetrical and streamlined tower. An extra battery was installed, and a new section of hull, 14 feet (4.3 m) long in the earlier conversions and 17 feet 6 inches (5.33 m) in the later ones, inserted to accommodate an extra pair of motors and switchgear. These changes allowed an underwater speed of 15 knots (28 km/h; 17 mph) or more, and increased the endurance to around 32 hours at 3 knots (5.6 km/h; 3.5 mph). The first boats to undergo this modification were Taciturn in November 1948 – March 1951, followed by Turpin in June 1949 – September 1951. The programme was completed with the conversion of Trump in February 1954 – June 1956. The conversion was not entirely successful since the metacentric height was reduced, making the boats roll heavily on the surface in rough weather. This was alleviated in 1953 in those conversions which had been completed by increasing the buoyancy by raising the capacity of a main ballast tank by 50 tons, merging it with an existing emergency oil fuel tank. For the four boats remaining to be converted, increase in buoyancy was achieved by lengthening the extra hull section to be inserted from 14 feet (4.3 m) to 17 feet 6 inches (5.33 m). The effect was to lengthen the control room; strict instructions were issued that this space was not to be used for extra equipment otherwise the improved buoyancy would be affected.

In December 1950, approval was given for the streamlining of five riveted boats. This was a much less extensive process, with the removal of deck guns and external torpedo tubes, the replacement of the conning tower by a "fin" and replacement of the batteries by more modern versions providing a 23 per cent increase in power. The work was much more straightforward than the conversion of the welded boats and was undertaken during normal refit. The first riveted boat to undergo this modification was Tireless in 1951.The boats converted in this way did not have such a significant increase in underwater performance as the more extensive conversions, but the streamlining made them just as quiet underwater, which was key to their anti-submarine warfare role. It was envisaged that they would use passive sonar to identify and engage enemy submarines snorkelling. Before streamlining, passive sonar was useless due to the boat's own noise when travelling faster than 4 knots; streamlining increased this to 8 knots, close to the 9-knot maximum underwater speed.

Britain offered India the T-class submarine following the 1965 Indo-Pakistani war as an alternative to India's preferred choice of Oberon-class. India would later buy Soviet Foxtrot class submarines instead.

The last operational Royal Navy boat of the class was Tiptoe, which was decommissioned on 29 August 1969. The last T-class boat in service with Royal Navy, albeit non-operationally, was Tabard, which was permanently moored as a static training submarine at the shore establishment HMS Dolphin from 1969 until 1974, when she was replaced by HMS Alliance.

The last operational boat anywhere was the INS Dolphin, formerly HMS Truncheon, one of three T-class and two S-class boats sold to the Israeli Navy; it was decommissioned in 1977.

Another submarine sold to Israel, Totem renamed INS Dakar, was lost in the Mediterranean in 1969 while on passage from Scotland to Haifa. The wreck was discovered in 1999, but the cause of the sinking is not known.

== Group One boats ==
These fifteen pre-war submarines were ordered under the Programmes of 1935 (Triton), 1936 (next four), 1937 (next seven) and 1938 (last three). The boats originally had a bulbous bow covering the two forward external torpedo tubes, which quickly produced complaints that they reduced surface speed in rough weather. These external tubes were therefore removed from Triumph during repairs after she was damaged by a mine and Thetis during the extensive repairs following her sinking and subsequent salvage. Only six survived the war, less than half.

- Triton sunk in the Adriatic Sea on 18 December 1940
- Thetis built at Cammell Laird. Sank during trials in 1939 with 99 dead. Thetis was salvaged and recommissioned as Thunderbolt in October 1940. Sunk by the Italian corvette Cicogna off Strait of Messina on 14 March 1943)
- Tribune, built at Scotts, Greenock, commissioned October 1939, scrapped 1947
- Trident built at Cammell Laird, commissioned October 1939, scrapped 1946
- Triumph built by Vickers, Barrow-in-Furness and commissioned May 1939. Lost off Cape Sounio to a torpedo detonation after hitting an Italian mine on 9 January 1942
- Taku scrapped 1946
- Tarpon (probably sunk by German minesweeper M-6 on 14 April 1940)
- Thistle torpedoed by U-4 on 10 April 1940 off Norway
- Tigris (probably sunk by German ship UJ-2210 on 27 February 1943)
- Triad sunk by gunfire from the Italian submarine Enrico Toti in the Gulf of Taranto on 15 October 1940
- Truant wrecked 1946 on way to breakers
- Tuna scrapped 1946
- Talisman lost in Mediterranean, probably to Italian mines, on 17 September 1942)
- Tetrarch, commissioned February 1940 the only boat completed with mine laying equipment. Lost in Mediterranean, probably to Italian mines, after 27 October 1941.
- Torbay built at Chatham, commissioned 1941, scrapped 1947.

== Group Two boats ==
These seven vessels were all ordered under the 1939 War Emergency Programme. The first, Thrasher, was launched on 5 November 1940. The external bow torpedo tubes were moved seven feet aft to help with sea keeping. The two external forward-angled tubes just forward of conning tower were repositioned aft of it and angled backwards to fire astern, and a stern external torpedo tube was also fitted. This gave a total of eight forward-facing tubes and three rear-facing ones. All Group Two boats were sent to the Mediterranean, only Thrasher and Trusty returned.

- Tempest (sunk by the Italian Spica-class torpedo boat Circe on 13 February 1942)
- Thorn (sunk by the Italian Orsa-class torpedo boat Pegaso on 6 August 1942)
- Thrasher
- Traveller (lost, probably to Italian mines, on 12 December 1942)
- Trooper (lost, probably to German mines, on 14 October 1943)
- Trusty
- Turbulent (possibly sunk by an Italian torpedo boat, or a mine in March 1943) During her career, she sank over 90,000 tons of enemy shipping.

== Group Three boats ==
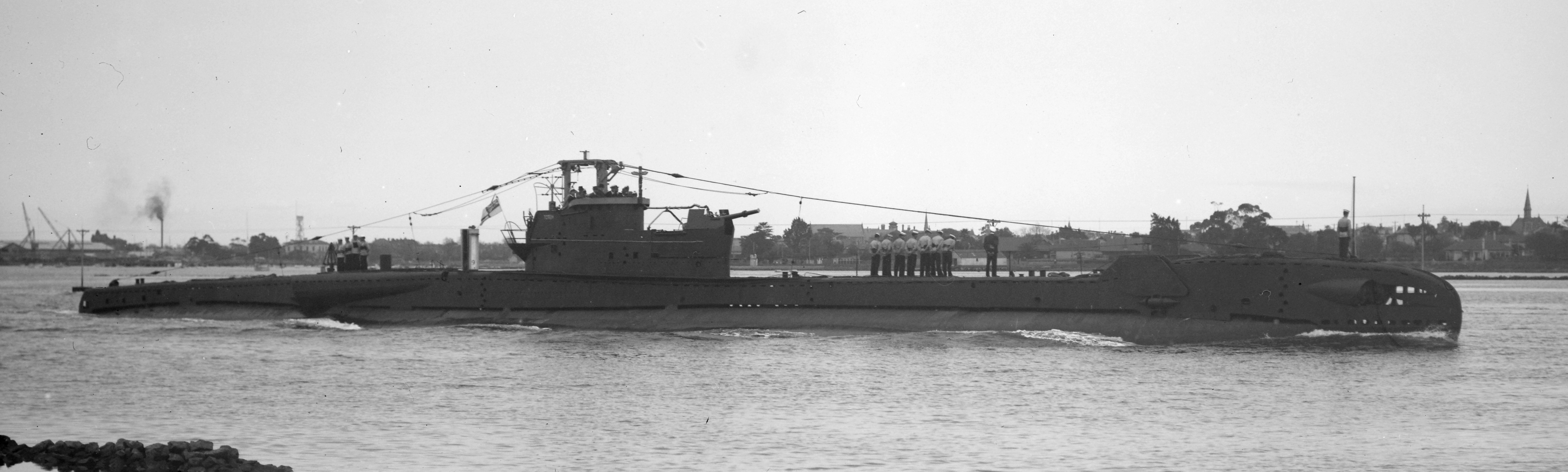
HMS Totem in September, 1945

Wartime austerity meant that they lacked many refinements such as jackstaffs and guardrails, and had only one anchor. Much of the internal pipework was steel rather than copper. The first Group Three boat was P311, launched on 10 June 1942. Welding gradually replaced riveting and some boats were completely welded, which gave them an improved rated maximum diving depth of 350 ft (107 m).

Nine submarines were ordered under the 1940 Programme;

- P311 (lost, probably to Italian mines, before her name Tutankhamen was formally assigned)
- Trespasser
- Taurus (to the Royal Netherlands Navy as Dolfijn)
- Tactician
- Truculent (sunk in collision on 12 January 1950)
- Templar
- Tally-Ho
- Tantalus
- Tantivy

Seventeen submarines were ordered under the 1941 Programme;

- Telemachus
- Talent (P322) (to the Royal Netherlands Navy as Zwaardvisch)
- Terrapin
- Thorough
- Thule
- Tudor
- Tireless
- Token
- Tradewind
- Trenchant
- Tiptoe
- Trump
- Taciturn
- Tapir (to the Royal Netherlands Navy as Zeehond (2))
- Tarn (to the Royal Netherlands Navy as Tijgerhaai)
- Talent (P337)
- Teredo

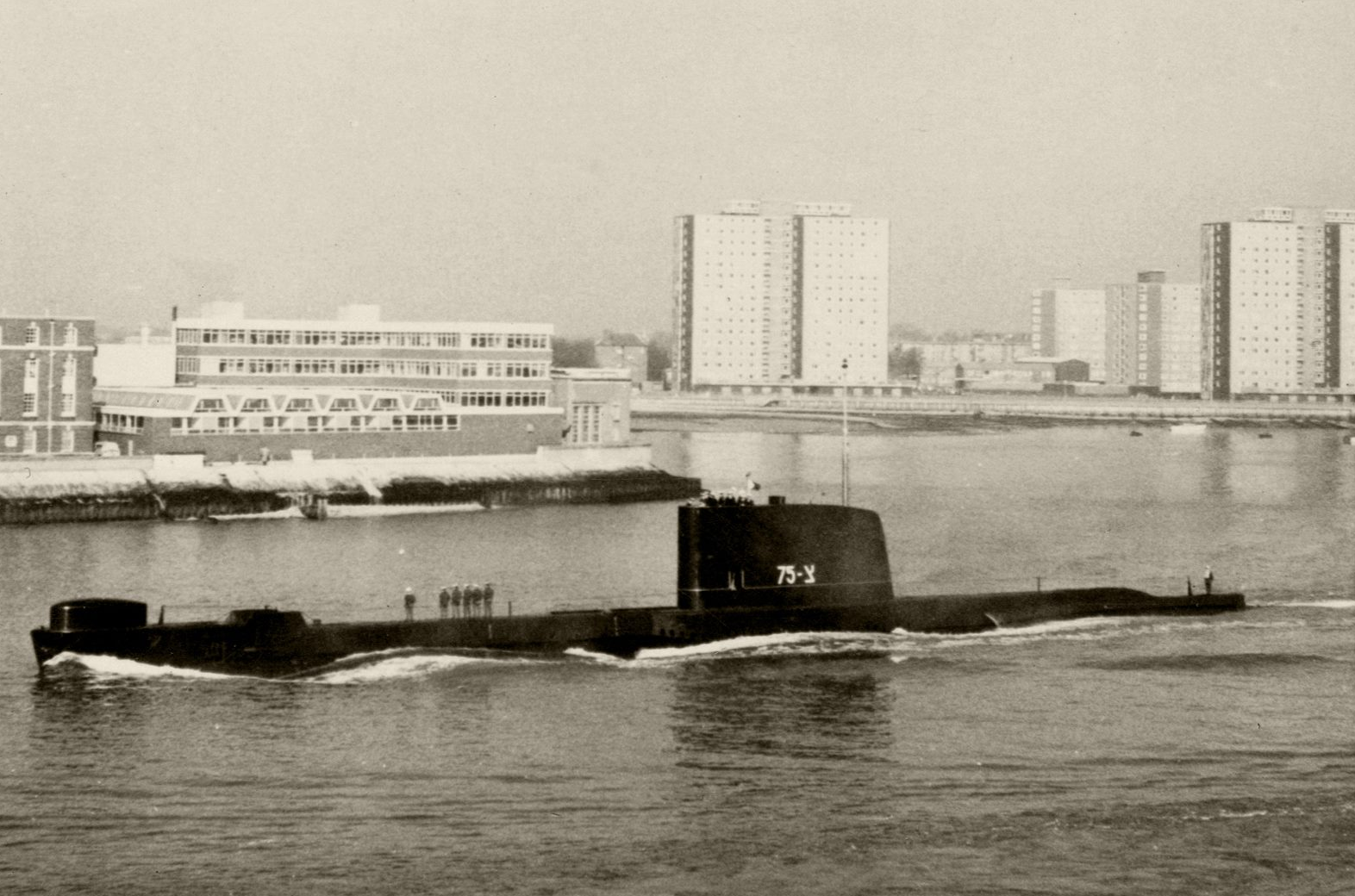
INS Leviathan (formerly HMS Turpin) departing Portsmouth, in 1967.

Fourteen submarines were ordered under the 1942 Programme, but only five were completed;

- Tabard
- Totem (lost in accident on passage to Israel as INS Dakar)
- Truncheon (later the Israeli INS Dolphin)
- Turpin (later the Israeli INS Leviathan)
- Thermopylae

The other nine were ordered but cancelled on 29 October 1945 following the end of hostilities:

- Thor (P349) (laid down at Portsmouth Dockyard on 5 April 1943 and launched on 18 April 1944. However, the war ended before she was completed and she was sold for scrapping to Rees Shipbreaking Co Ltd of Llanelli, Wales in July 1946. She would have been the only ship of the Royal Navy to bear the name Thor, after the mythological Norse god of thunder.
- Tiara (also launched on 18 April 1944 at Portsmouth but not completed)
- Theban (P341)
- Talent (P343)
- Threat (P344)
- also four unnamed submarines (P345, P346, P347 and P348).

== Transfers to Royal Netherlands Navy ==
Four submarines were transferred to the Royal Netherlands Navy in the 1940s were they formed the Zwaardvisch class. Two were later returned in 1953.

- Tijgerhaai (ex-Tarn): transferred 1944
- Zwaardvisch (ex-Talent): transferred 1943
- Zeehond (2) (ex-Tapir): transferred 1948, returned 1953
- Dolfijn (ex-Taurus): transferred 1948, returned 1953

== Transfers to the Israeli Navy ==
Three submarines were sold to the Israeli Navy in the 1960s. Totem, renamed Dakar, was lost in transit in 1968.

- INS Dakar (ex-Totem): sold 1965, commissioned 1967; lost January 1968.
- INS Dolphin (ex-Truncheon): sold 1968
- INS Leviathan (ex-Turpin): sold 1965, commissioned 1967

== See also ==
Equivalent submarines of the same era

- O 21 class
- Aurore class
- Brin class
- Orzeł class
- Mackerel class
- S class
- Type VII
