= HMS Truncheon =

Submarine of the Royal Navy

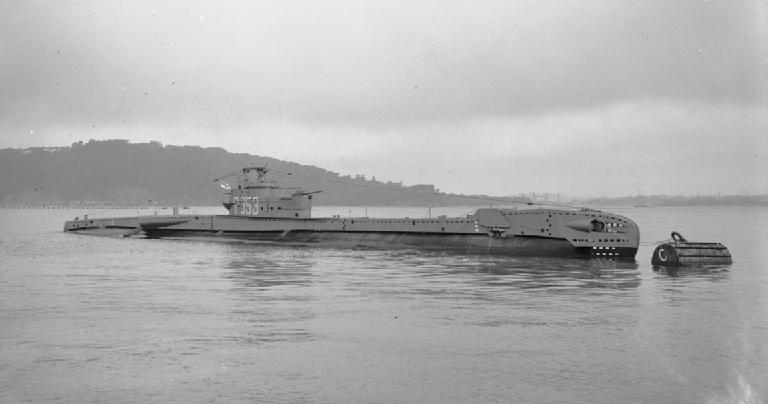
- HMS Truncheon secured to a buoy in Plymouth Sound, May 1945

History

United Kingdom
- Name: HMS Truncheon
- Builder: Devonport Dockyard
- Laid down: 5 November 1942
- Launched: 22 February 1944
- Commissioned: 25 May 1945
- Fate: Sold to Israeli Navy as INS Dolphin in 1968
- Badge

Israel
- Name: INS Dolphin
- Commissioned: 1968
- Renamed: אח"י דולפין
- Identification: צ-79
- Fate: Scrapped 1977

General characteristics
- Displacement: 1,290 long tons (1,310 t) surfaced; 1,560 long tons (1,590 t) submerged
- Length: 276 ft 6 in (84.28 m)
- Beam: 25 ft 6 in (7.77 m)
- Draught: 12 ft 9 in (3.89 m) forward; 14 ft 7 in (4.45 m) aft
- Propulsion: Two shafts; Twin diesel engines 2,500 hp (1.86 MW) each; Twin electric motors 1,450 hp (1.08 MW) each
- Speed: 15.5 knots (28.7 km/h) surfaced; Nine knots (20 km/h) submerged
- Range: 4,500 nautical miles at 11 knots (8,330 km at 20 km/h) surfaced
- Test depth: 300 ft (91 m) max
- Complement: 61
- Armament: Six internal forward-facing 21 inch (533 mm) torpedo tubes; Two external forward-facing torpedo tubes; Two external amidships rear-facing torpedo tubes; One external rear-facing torpedo tubes; Six reload torpedoes; QF 4 inch (100 mm) deck gun; Three anti-aircraft machine guns

HMS Truncheon (pennant number P353) was a group three T Class submarine of the Royal Navy which entered service in the last few months of World War II. So far she has been the only ship of the Royal Navy to be named Truncheon. She was sold to Israel in 1968, and commissioned into the Israeli Sea Corps as INS Dolphin.

== Career ==
=== As HMS Truncheon ===
At the end of the war, all surviving Group 1 and Group 2 boats were scrapped, but the group 3 boats (which were of welded rather than riveted construction), were retained and fitted with snorkel masts.

Truncheon was sold to the Israeli Navy in 1968, and renamed Dolphin.

=== As INS Dolphin ===
The submarine was purchased by Israel in 1968. Two of her T-class sisters, HMS Turpin and HMS Totem, were also sold to Israel. She was commissioned into the Israeli Sea Corps in 1968.

She was eventually scrapped in 1977. By the time of her decommissioning, she was the only T class submarine in service in the world. The lead boat of the new Dolphin-class submarine commissioned in 1999 carried on the name Dolphin.

== Footnotes ==
- Colledge, J. J.; Warlow, Ben (2006) [1969]. Ships of the Royal Navy: The Complete Record of All Fighting Ships of the Royal Navy from the 15th Century to the Present (3rd Rev ed.). London: Chatham Publishing. ISBN 978-1-86176-281-8. OCLC 67375475.
- Hutchinson, Robert (2001). Jane's Submarines: War Beneath the Waves from 1776 to the Present Day. London: HarperCollins. ISBN 978-0-00-710558-8. OCLC 53783010.
