= Japanese ship-naming conventions =

Traditional naming patterns in Japan

Japanese ship names follow different conventions from those typical in the West. Merchant ship names often contain the word maru at the end (meaning circle), while warships are never named after people, but rather after objects such as mountains, islands, weather phenomena, or animals.

== Merchant ships ==
The word maru (丸; meaning "circle") is often attached to Japanese ship names. The first ship known to follow this practice was the Nippon Maru, flagship of daimyō Toyotomi Hideyoshi's 16th century fleet.

Several theories purport to explain this practice:

- The most common is that ships were thought of as floating castles, and the word referred to the defensive "circles" or maru that protected the castle.
- The suffix -maru is often applied to words representing something beloved, and sailors applied this suffix to their ships.
- The term maru is used in divination and represents perfection or completeness, or the ship as "a small world of its own".
- The myth of Hakudo Maru, a celestial being that came to earth and taught humans how to build ships. It is said that the name maru is attached to a ship to secure celestial protection for itself as it travels.
- For the past few centuries, only non-warships bore the -maru ending. Its use was intended as a good hope naming convention that would allow a ship to leave port, travel the world, and return safely to home port: hence the complete circle or "round trip" arriving back at its origin unhurt.
- "Hinomaru", or "sun-disc", is a name often applied to the national flag of Japan.

Today many commercial and private ships are still named using this convention.

== Warships ==
=== Early conventions ===
When the Imperial Japanese Navy was formed, the Ministry of the Navy submitted potential ship names to the Emperor for approval. During the early years ships were often donated by the Shogunate or Japanese clans and the original clan names were kept.

In 1891 the procedure was changed due to changes in the government structure. Two ship names were submitted by the Minister of the Navy to the Lord Chamberlain who then presented the choices to the Emperor. The Emperor could either pick one of the suggested names or one of his own devising.

Ships captured during the First Sino-Japanese War kept their original names but with Japanese pronunciation. For example, the Chinese battleship Chen Yuan became Chin'en in Japanese service.

In 1876 the Minister of the Navy was given the authority to choose the names of torpedo boats without imperial approval. In 1902 the authority to name destroyers was delegated to the Minister of the Navy as well.

In 1895 a proposal was made by the Minister of the Navy in an attempt to establish some standard. He proposed that battleships and cruisers be named for provinces or shrines dedicated to protecting Japan, that names of other warships be selected from the names for Japan or provinces.

Ships captured during the Russo-Japanese War were renamed with Japanese names. Some of these vessels were given names related to where they were captured or some other aspect of the war, such as the month of capture. Some Russian ships were given Japanese names that were phonetically similar to their original Russian names (example: Angara became Anegawa).

In 1921 the Minister of the Navy was given authority to name all ships except battleships, battlecruisers, and cruisers. In any event the Navy had to report the new name to the Emperor immediately.

=== Establishment of ship naming conventions 1905 ===
On 23 April 1905, Naval Minister Gonbee Yamamoto reported to the throne about a new ship naming standard. It was decided on 1 August 1905.

- Battleship: provinces, or alternate names of Japan
- First class cruiser (and over 7,500 tons displacement): mountains
- Second class cruiser (and over 3,500 tons displacement—less than 7,500 tons displacement): put the initial Ni (に)
- Third class cruiser (less than 3,500 tons displacement): put the initial Ha (は)
- Other ship names: They were named voluntarily by Naval Minister.

However, second class and third class cruisers ended up with river names because it became complicated.

It passed through some changes afterwards, the broad categories of names are given here, with examples, however, if the name is the succession to a ship's name, it is excluded from following contents.

- Aircraft carriers—special names (Many of them are an inheritance from the warship name in the Bakumatsu and the Meiji period). In fact, names related to flying animals, actual or mythological, were used.
  - Fleet aircraft carrier; put the initial Ryū (龍, dragon), Tsuru (Kaku) (鶴, crane) or Ōtori (Hō) (鳳, phoenix) before/after her name
    - Hōshō (鳳翔) Flying phoenix
    - Ryūjō (龍驤) Prancing dragon
    - Hiryū (飛龍) Flying dragon
    - Sōryū (蒼龍) Blue (or green) dragon
    - Shōkaku (翔鶴) Flying crane
    - Zuikaku (瑞鶴) Auspicious crane
    - Taihō (大鳳) Great phoenix
  - Converted warship; put the initial Ōtori (Hō) (鳳, phoenix) after her name
    - Zuihō (瑞鳳) Fortunate phoenix
    - Chitose (千歳) and Chiyoda (千代田) did not change their name by a vote by the crews.
  - Converted merchant ship; put the initial Taka (Yō) (鷹, falcon/hawk) after her name
    - Jun'yō (隼鷹) Peregrine falcon
  - And after 4 June 1943—added provinces and mountains
    - Amagi (天城) Mount Amagi
    - Katsuragi (葛城) Mount Yamato-Katsuragi on prefectural boundary Nara prefecture—Osaka Prefecture
- Battleships, including those converted into aircraft carriers—provinces and alternate names for Japan.
  - Nagato (長門) Nagato Province
  - Yamato (大和) Yamato Province (also an alternate name for Japan and its people)
  - Kaga (加賀) Kaga Province
  - Fusō (扶桑) Fusang (another name of Japan)
- Battlecruisers and heavy cruisers, including those converted into aircraft carriers—mountains
  - Kongō (金剛) Mount Kongō, a mountain in Osaka Prefecture
  - Kirishima (霧島) Mount Kirishima, a volcano in Kagoshima prefecture
  - Akagi (赤城) Mount Akagi, a volcano in the Kantō region
  - Chōkai (鳥海) Mount Chōkai, a volcano in the Tōhoku region
- Light cruisers, including those converted into heavy cruisers—river names
  - Tone (利根) Tone River, a river in the Kantō region
  - Chikuma (筑摩) Chikuma River, a river in Nagano Prefecture
  - Suzuya (鈴谷) Suzuya River, a river in Karafuto Prefecture (now Sakhalin)
  - Yūbari (夕張) Yūbari River, a river in Hokkaidō
- Training cruisers (post-1940)—Shinto shrines
  - Katori (香取) Katori Shrine
- Destroyers
  - Until 27 August 1912—weather, wind, tide, current, wave, moon, season, other natural phenomenon, plants
  - And after 28 August 1912
    - First class destroyers (and over 1,000 tons displacement)—weather, wind, tide, current, wave, moon, season, other natural phenomenon
      - Ikazuchi (雷) Thunder
      - Yukikaze (雪風) Snowy wind
      - Michishio (満潮) High tide
      - Oyashio (親潮) Oyashio Current
      - Sazanami (漣) Ripples on the water surface
      - Takanami (高波) High wave
      - Mikazuki (三日月) Crescent moon
      - Yūgumo (夕雲) Evening cloud
      - Yūdachi (夕立) Evening squall
      - Mutsuki (睦月) January in lunar calendar
      - Wakaba (若葉) Young leaves
      - Yūgure (夕暮) Twilight
      - Hibiki (響) Echo
    - Second class destroyers (and over 600 tons displacement—less than 1,000 tons displacement)—plants
      - Nara (楢) Oak
      - Momi (樅) Abies firma
      - Sanae (早苗) Rice sprouts
  - Between 12 October 1921—31 July 1928 under the Eight-eight fleet programme
    - First class destroyers (Kamikaze class, Mutsuki class and Fubuki class)—Odd numbers from 1 to 27, consecutive numbers and after 28
      - Destroyer No. 1 (第1駆逐艦), renamed Kamikaze on 1 August 1928
      - Destroyer No. 46 (第46号駆逐艦), renamed Shikinami on 6 August 1928
    - Second class destroyers (Wakatake class)—Even numbers from '2' to '26'
      - Destroyer No. 18 (第18駆逐艦), renamed Karukaya on 1 August 1928
  - And after 4 June 1943
    - Type 'A' destroyers—rain, tide
      - Akisame (秋雨) Autumn rain
      - Takashio (高潮) High tide
    - Type 'B' destroyers—wind, moon, cloud, season
      - Yamazuki (山月) Moon over a mountain
      - Yukigumo (雪雲) Snow cloud
      - Hae (南風) South wind of dialect word in Okinawa Prefecture, standard Japanese is Minamikaze
      - Hayaharu (早春) Early spring
    - Type 'D' destroyers—plants
      - Matsu (松) Pine tree
      - Nashi (梨) Pyrus pyrifolia
      - Wakakusa (若草) Spring grass
- Torpedo boats
  - Until 15 January 1924
    - First class torpedo boats (and over 120 tons displacement)—birds
      - Hayabusa (隼) Peregrine falcon
    - Second class and third class torpedo boats (less than 120 tons displacement)—consecutive number from '1'
      - Torpedo boat No. 21 (第21号水雷艇)
  - And after 30 May 1931—birds
    - Chidori (千鳥) Plover
    - Kiji (雉) Pheasant
- Submarines
  - Until 31 October 1924—consecutive number from '1'
    - Submarine No. 1 (第1潜水艦)
    - Submarine No. 44 (第44号潜水艦)
  - And after 1 November 1924
    - First class submarines (and over 1,000 tons displacement) — 'I' (伊) and consecutive number from '1', 'I' is first letter in the Iroha
      - I-1 (伊号第1潜水艦) I-Gō Dai-1 sensuikan
      - I-51 (伊号第51潜水艦) I-Gō Dai-51 sensuikan
    - Second class submarines (and over 500 tons displacement — less than 1,000 tons displacement) — 'Ro' (呂) and consecutive number from '1', 'Ro' is second letter in the Iroha
      - Ro-1 (呂号第1潜水艦) Ro-Gō Dai-1 sensuikan
      - Ro-51 (呂号第51潜水艦) Ro-Gō Dai-51 sensuikan
    - Third class submarines (less than 500 tons displacement)—'Ha' (波) and consecutive number from '1', 'Ha' is third letter in the Iroha, third class submarines were unified to second class submarines on 30 May 1931
      - Ha-1 (波号第1潜水艦) Ha-Gō Dai-1 sensuikan
      - Ha-9 (波号第9潜水艦) Ha-Gō Dai-9 sensuikan
- Gunboats—places of scenic beauty and historic interest
  - Ataka (安宅) Ataka-no-Seki is a barrier station in Kamakura period
  - Suma (須磨) Suma-no-Ura is beauty spot in Hyōgo Prefecture
- Coast defence ship/Escort ships
  - Until 30 June 1942—Island
    - Shimushu (占守) Shumshu is one of the Kuril Islands
  - And after 1 July 1942
    - Type 'A' and Type 'B' Escort ships—Island
      - Etorofu (択捉) Iturup
      - Okinawa (沖縄) Okinawa Island
    - Type 'C' escort ships—Odd numbers from '1'
    - Type 'D' escort ships—Even numbers from '2'
- Submarine tenders—whales
  - Jingei (迅鯨) Swift whale
- Seaplane tenders—abstract noun, idiomatic word, notable achievement vessels in past war
  - Chitose (千歳) Long life
  - Mizuho (瑞穂) another name of Japan, The Land of Vigorous Rice Plants by literal translation
  - Nisshin (日進) succession to ship name Nisshin
  - Akitsushima (秋津州) succession to ship name Akitsushima
- Minelayers
  - as warship (fitted imperial seal on bow)—Island, islands, ancient battlefield
    - Itsukushima (厳島) ancient battlefield of the Battle of Miyajima (Itsukushima Kassen)
    - Okinoshima (沖島) Okinoshima, and battlefield of the Battle of Tsushima
    - Yaeyama (八重山) Yaeyama Islands
  - as mine boat and cable layer—cape, point, island, islet
    - Sokuten (測天) Sokuten Island is one of the island of the Penghu
    - Shirakami (白神) Cape Shirakami
  - as auxiliary minelayer—numbered name
    - Auxiliary minelayer No. 1 (第1号敷設特務艇)
- Netlayers
  - as warship (fitted imperial seal on bow)
    - Until 3 June 1943—put the initial Taka (鷹, hawk) after her name
      - Shirataka (白鷹) White hawk
    - And after 4 June 1943—birds
      - Asadori (朝鳥) Birds in morning
  - as net laying boat—birds
    - Tsubame (燕) Barn swallow
- Auxiliary ships
  - Collier, oiler, icebreaker, freighter, repair ship, self-propelled target ship, munition ship—cape, point, strait, channel, bay, port
    - Wakamiya (若宮) Cape Wakamiya; her first classification was transport ship. Cape Wakamiya (Wakamiya-zaki) is in Wakamiya Island, Oki Islands
    - Akashi (明石) Akashi Strait is water between the Akashi and Awaji Island
    - Nojima (野島) Cape Nojima in Bōsō Peninsula
    - Hayasui (速吸) Hayasui-no-Seto is former name of the Hōyo Strait
    - Ōtomari (大泊) Port of Ōtomari in southern Sakhalin Island
  - Minesweeper, landing ship, patrol boat, motor torpedo boat, submarine chaser — numbered name
    - Minesweeper No. 1 (第1号掃海艇)
    - Landing ship No. 1 (第1号輸送艦)
    - Patrol boat No. 1 (第1号哨戒艇)
    - Motor torpedo boat No. 1 (第1号魚雷艇)
    - Submarine chaser No. 1 (第1号駆潜艇)
- Miscellaneous ships
  - Cargo ship, salvage ship—bridge or station on the arterial road
    - Komahashi (駒橋) Komahashi-shuku is station on Kōshū Kaidō
    - Yodohashi (淀橋) Yodohashi bridge on Ōme Kaidō
  - Repair ship—strait, isthmus
    - Hayase (早瀬) Hayase-no-Seto is water between the Kurahashi Island and Higashi-Nōmi Island
    - Hitonose (飛渡瀬) Hitonose is isthmus between the Etajima and Nōmi Island
  - And over 600-ton Salvage ship and tugboat, and after 22 January 1937—associated name of the naval base (anchorage name, place name, island)
    - Tategami (立神) Tategami anchorage in the Sasebo Naval Base
    - Hashima (波島) Hashima Island is small island in the Yokosuka Naval Base
  - Other miscellaneous ships—numbered name

=== Post–World War II ===
Prior to the end of World War II Japanese ship names were rendered in kanji; after the end of the war this tradition was abandoned in favor of hiragana to separate the perception of the Maritime Self-Defense Forces from the old navy.

- Helicopter destroyers and Helicopter carriers (DDH)—traditional provinces and mountains
- Guided missile destroyers (DDG)—mountains and weather terms
- Small destroyers (DD)—weather terms
- Frigates (DE)(FFM)—rivers
- Submarines (SS)—ocean currents and legendary auspicious animals
- Replenishment oilers (AOE)—lakes
- Amphibious transport docks and troopships (LST)—peninsulas
- Minesweepers (MSO)—islands,
- Submarine rescue ships (ASR)—peninsulas
- Training ships (AMS)(ATS)(TV)—shrines and cities
- Icebreakers (AGB)—glaciers and mountains
- Cable laying ships (ARC)—cities
- Patrol boats (PG)(OPV)—birds of prey and trees
- Research vessels (AOS)(AGS)—cities, regions, traditional provinces, and nouns

== Translated names ==
The English translations of the Japanese warships provide names; the literal translation of the characters does not necessarily represent how the name is perceived to the Japanese. For example, Akagi is probably perceived as "red castle" by Japanese about as often as Philadelphia is perceived as the "city of brotherly love" by Americans.

There is a tendency for translations of Japanese names to be somewhat fanciful. For example, Shōkaku is often translated as "crane flying in heaven", but "flying crane" or "soaring crane" is a more accurate translation. Another fanciful translation is "land of divine mulberry trees" for Fusō—fuso was a Chinese name for a mythical tree supposed to grow to the east, hence an old poetic word for Japan.

In World War II, the composition of the Japanese Navy was a military secret. US Naval Intelligence built up knowledge of enemy ships through photographic reconnaissance, interrogation of prisoners, and signal interception. Inevitably there were mistakes and misinterpretations; some of these have been repeated in post-war accounts that rely on US Navy documents. For example, a prisoner of war after the battle of Midway reported the existence of an aircraft carrier named Hayataka. This was a misreading of the characters 隼鷹 in kun-yomi, while they in this case are properly read in on-yomi as Jun'yō. Accordingly, many US documents refer to the carrier as Hayataka or its class as the Hayataka class. In another example, when Joseph F. Enright claimed the sinking of the Japanese Aircraft Carrier Shinano, US naval intelligence was originally only willing to credit him with sinking a cruiser; this was in part because they believed the name "Shinano" (derived from intercepted Japanese transmissions) referred to the Shinano River (thereby denoting a cruiser), when in fact the name referred to the Shinano province of Japan. (Shinano had begun construction as a Yamato-class battleship and was thus named for a province, before being converted into an aircraft carrier following the Battle of Midway.)
