= Japanese ship Aotaka =

Two ships of the Japanese Navy have been named Aotaka:

- Japanese torpedo boat Aotaka (1903), a Hayabusa-class torpedo boat launched in 1903 and stricken in 1923
- Japanese minelayer Aotaka, a Hatsutaka-class minelayer launched in 1940 and sunk in 1944
