= HNLMS Tijgerhaai =

HNLMS Tijgerhaai may refer to the following submarines of the Royal Netherlands Navy:

- HNLMS Tijgerhaai (P336), a Zwaardvisch-class submarine
- HNLMS Tijgerhaai (S807), a Zwaardvis-class submarine
