= Anthony Troup =

Royal Navy Vice-Admiral (1921-2008)

Vice-Admiral Sir Anthony Troup KCB DSC*
- Born: 18 July 1921; Bath, Somerset, England
- Died: 8 July 2008 (aged 86)
- Military career
- Allegiance: United Kingdom
- Branch: Royal Navy
- Service years: 1934–1977
- Rank: Vice Admiral
- Commands: Flag Officer, Scotland and Northern Ireland (1974–77); Flag Officer Submarines (1972–74); Far East Fleet (1971); Flag Officer Sea Training (1969–71); HMS Intrepid (1966–68); 3rd Submarine Squadron (1962–63); HMS Maidstone (1962–63); HMS Truncheon (1953–54); HMS Trump (1947); HMS Strongbow (1943–45); HMS H32 (1943)
- Conflicts: Second World War
- Awards: Knight Commander of the Order of the Bath; Distinguished Service Cross & Bar; Mentioned in Despatches

Vice-Admiral Sir John Anthony Rose Troup, KCB, DSC & Bar (18 July 1921 – 8 July 2008) was a Royal Navy officer. A submariner, he served as the last Commander-in-Chief Far East Fleet (1971).

== Early life ==
Born in Bath, Somerset, on 18 July 1921, Troup was the son of Hugh Rose Troup (1885–1968), an officer in the Royal Navy who played an important role in the evacuation from Dunkirk in 1940.

== Naval career ==
Troup studied at Pangbourne College, associated with the nautical training college HMS Worcester, until 1934. He joined the Royal Navy in 1934, and studied at the Royal Naval College in Dartmouth until 1936.

Troup served in the Second World War, initially on the cruisers HMS Vindictive in 1938–39 and then HMS Cornwall in 1939–40. He served on the submarine HMS Turbulent from September 1941 to early 1943, commanded by John "Tubby" Linton in the 10th Submarine Flotilla. After briefly commanding HMS H32 in June to August 1943, he was commanding officer of the submarine HMS Strongbow from September 1943 until the end of the war, based at Trincomalee. In January 1945, HMS Strongbow was badly battered by Japanese depth charges, but Troup nursed his severely damaged vessel 1,000 miles (1,600 km) across the Indian Ocean back to its base, where she assessed as unfit for further service.

Troup was mentioned in despatches in September 1942, and then received the Distinguished Service Cross (DSC) in May 1943, both awarded for his submarine patrols in the Mediterranean, and was awarded a Bar to the DSC in August 1945 for his patrols in the Far East.

Troup served on the cruiser HMS Cumberland in 1945–46, and commanded the submarines HMS Tantalus, HMS Trump and HMS Tally-Ho. He was appointed second-in-command of the aircraft carrier HMS Victorious in 1956, commanding officer of the 3rd Submarine Squadron in 1961 and then captain of the ship HMS Intrepid from 1966 to 1968.

Troup went on to be Flag Officer Sea Training in 1969 and was the last Commander-in-Chief, Far East Fleet in 1971. He was made Flag Officer Submarines in 1972 and Flag Officer, Scotland and Northern Ireland in 1974. He was appointed a Knight Commander of the Order of the Bath in 1975, and retired in 1977.

== Family and later life ==
In 1943, Troup married Joy Gordon-Smith: by his first marriage he had two sons and a daughter. In 1953 he married Cordelia Hope: they also had two sons (including Edward Troup, born 1955) and a daughter.

Troup joined the Royal Yacht Squadron in 1964. In retirement, he became vice-chairman and group managing director of the shipbuilder Vosper Thornycroft.

Military offices
Preceded by John Roxburgh	Flag Officer Sea Training; 1969–1971	Succeeded by Gerard Mansfield
Preceded by Sir Derek Empson	Commander-in-Chief, Far East Fleet; 1971	Post abolished
Preceded by Sir John Roxburgh	Flag Officer Submarines; 1972–1974	Succeeded by Sir Iwan Raikes
Preceded by Martin Lucey	Flag Officer, Scotland and Northern Ireland; 1974–1977	Succeeded by Sir Cameron Rusby
