= Itsukushima (disambiguation) =

Itsukushima is an island in the western part of the Inland Sea of Japan, located in the northwest of Hiroshima Bay.

Itsukushima may also refer to:

== Ships ==
- Japanese cruiser Itsukushima
- Japanese minelayer Itsukushima

== Other uses ==
- 7852 Itsukushima, an asteroid
