= Japanese minelayer Wakataka =

Imperial Japanese Navy vessel

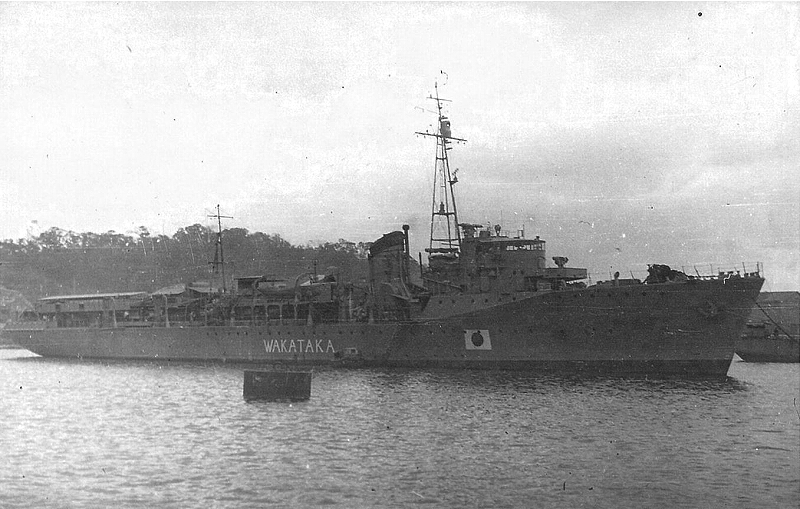
- Demilitarized Wakataka in 1947

History

Japan
- Name: Wakataka
- Ordered: fiscal 1939
- Builder: Harima Shipyard
- Laid down: November 15, 1940
- Launched: July 12, 1941
- Commissioned: November 30, 1941
- Stricken: July 1, 1946
- Fate: Prize of war to UK

Malaysia
- Name: HMMS Laburnum (until 1963); KD Singapura
- Acquired: September 1949
- Stricken: December 31, 1965
- Fate: Transferred to Singapore
- Badge

Singapore
- Name: RSS Singapura
- Acquired: January 1, 1966
- Commissioned: May 5, 1967
- Decommissioned: Unknown; labelled as "ex RSS Singapura" on 2 December 1967
- Fate: Sold for scrap in 1967

General characteristics
- Type: minelayer
- Displacement: 1,608 long tons (1,634 t) standard, 1860 tons normal
- Length: 82.5 m (271 ft) pp, 86.5 m (284 ft) waterline
- Beam: 11.3 m (37 ft 1 in)
- Draught: 4 m (13 ft 1 in)
- Propulsion: 2-shaft geared turbine engine, 3 boilers, 6,000 hp (4,500 kW)
- Speed: 20 knots (23 mph; 37 km/h)
- Range: 3,000 nmi (5,600 km) at 14 knots (19 km/h)
- Complement: 202
- Electronic warfare & decoys: Type 22 and 13 radars and Type 93 and/or Type 3 sonar
- Armament: 2 × Type 3 80 mm AA Guns; 4 × 13.2 mm (0.52 in) machine guns; 24 × Type 96 510 m (1,673 ft 3 in) anti-submarine nets or 100 × Type 93 naval mines

Wakataka (若鷹, Young Hawk) was the third and final vessel in the Hatsutaka-class of medium-sized minelayers of the Imperial Japanese Navy, which was in service during World War II. She was designed as an improved version of Shirataka netlayer. Due to the critical shortage of patrol ships for convoy escort duties during the Pacific War, she was fitted with depth charge racks and her minelaying rails were removed.

After the surrender of Japan, Wakataka was transferred to the Royal Navy as a prize of war. She was transferred to the Malayan Navy Volunteer Force as HMMS Laburnum and placed in the naval reserve in 1956 before being recommissioned in 1963 as KD Singapura and RSS Singapura in 1967 following Singapore's independence from Malaysia, where she served as a floating headquarters. Singapura was subsequently sold for scrap in December 1967.

== Construction ==
Under the Maru-4 Supplemental Armaments Budget of 1939, the Imperial Japanese Navy authorized an additional vessel in the Hatsutaka-series of minelayers, primarily for coastal duties in the China theater of operations in the Second Sino-Japanese War. Wakataka differed from her sister ships in that her main armament was changed to twin Type 3 80 mm AA Guns.

Wakataka was launched by the Harima Shipyard near Kobe on July 12, 1941, and was commissioned into service on November 30, 1941.

== Japanese service ==
After commissioning, Wakataka was assigned to the Sasebo Naval District, but was soon reassigned to the Second Base Force of the IJN 3rd Fleet, based at Takao in Taiwan.

At the time of the attack on Pearl Harbor in December 1941, Wakataka was assigned to "Operation M", (the invasion of the northern Philippines), escorting several convoys of transports between the Japanese home islands, Palau and landing zones in the Philippines.

In January 1942, Wakataka was assigned to the invasion of Dutch Borneo, covering the invasion of Tarakan by the Kure No.2 SNLF and the Sakaguchi Brigade (the 56th Mixed Infantry Brigade) early at the beginning of the month, and Balikpapan at the end of the month. On March 10, Wakataka was reassigned to the Second Expeditionary Fleet under the Southwest Area Fleet, based at Surabaya and was assigned to patrol and convoy escort duties. During Operation S (the invasion of the Lesser Sunda Islands) in May, Wakataka transported a portion of the Yokosuka No.1 SNLF from Surabaya to Lombok, Sumbawa, Flores, and Kupang on Timor. Following the successful completion of that operation, Wakataka remained on patrol duty in the Netherlands East Indies until December 29, 1942, when she was reassigned to the 25th Base Force of the Southwest Area Fleet, and participated in the capture of Hollandia, Dutch New Guinea in January 1943.

During most of 1943, Wakataka shuttled between Ambon Manokwari and Hollandia, with occasional voyages to Palau and to points around Halmahera. She was reassigned to the Fourth Expeditionary Fleet (still within the Southwest Area Fleet in November), and transported part of the IJA 26th Division to New Guinea by the end of the year.

During early 1944, Wakataka continued to be assigned to convoy escort duties in the eastern Netherland East Indies. In early February, she unsuccessfully attacked USS Hake (SS-256) with depth charges in the Celebes Sea and in March unsuccessfully attacked USS Bowfin (SS-287). Likewise, while on convoy protection patrol, she unsuccessfully attacked USS Sand Lance (SS-381) at Staring-baai on July 14. In October, she towed the damaged minelayer Japanese minelayer Itsukushima from Celebes but was spotted by Royal Dutch Navy submarine HNLMS Zwaardvisch (P322) (ex HMS Talent) while transiting the Java Sea on October 17. Zwaardvisch fired five torpedoes, one of which sank Itsukushima, and another of which struck Wakataka in the bow but did not explode.

Repairs at Surabaya took until early March 1945 to complete, at which time Wakataka was reassigned to the IJN 10th Area Fleet. On March 25, 1945, south of Sumbawa, Wakataka was attacked by HMS Stygian (P249) and took a direct torpedo hit which significantly damaged her bow, killing around 20 crewmen. Repair crews at Surabaya fashioned a false bow at the break, shortening her length by about 5–6 meters, and she returned to active duty in July with the Southwest Area Fleet; however, repairs were not completed by the time of the surrender of Japan on August 15, 1945 due to shortages of materials.

After the end of World War II, Wakataka was demilitarized and used as a repatriation vessel, evacuating Japanese troops from Labuan and Kuching to Singapore. She was officially removed from the navy list on March 1, 1946.

Returned to Japan, Wakataka was repaired at Kagoshima in March 1946 and continued to be used as a repatriation vessel by the SCAP in 1946, primarily between Manila, Saigon, Takao, Singapore Okinawa, Palembang, Bangkok and Hong Kong through the end of the year. After repairs in January 1947, Wakataka was turned over to the Royal Navy as a prize of war on October 17, 1947.

== Malayan/Malaysian service ==
In December 1948, the British government created the Malayan Navy Volunteer Force (MVF) and in September 1949 assigned Wakataka to the new organization as the HMMS Laburnum to be used as a training vessel. The MVF became the Royal Malayan Navy in August 1952. HMMS Laburnum continued to serve until 1956, when it was removed from active service and placed under the Singapore Division of the Malayan Royal Naval Volunteer Reserve. The ship was renamed KD Singapura and recommissioned in 1963.

== Singaporean service ==
In 1965, Singapore separated from Malaysia to become an independent republic. On January 1, 1966, KD Singapura was assigned to the Singapore Naval Volunteer Force (SNVF) as a training vessel, while remaining berthed at Telok Ayer Basin. On May 5, 1967, the ship was re-commissioned as RSS Singapura and became the official headquarters of the Singapore Naval Volunteers (SNV). Only a few months later, on 29 August, it was decided to scrap her; Singapura had spent over 16 years pier side at that point. By November, headquarters had shifted to Pulau Belakang Mati and there were preliminary proposals for her to be converted into a floating night club or restaurant instead.

Tenders were opened on 2 December for bids on Singapura and was to run until 22 December, with the winner obliged to tow her away within a week of accepting the tender. She was offered at a cost of $40,000 and sold for scrap by the end of 1967.
