= Strongbow =

Strongbow may refer to:

== People ==
- Gilbert de Clare, 1st Earl of Pembroke, a Norman earl commonly known as "Strongbow"
- Richard de Clare, 2nd Earl of Pembroke, his son, also commonly known as "Strongbow"
- Jules Strongbow, wrestler in the 1980s–1990s
- Chief Jay Strongbow, wrestler in the 1940s–1980s

== Fictional characters ==
- Beleg Cúthalion (literally "Strongbow"), a character in J. R. R. Tolkien's Quenta Silmarillion
- A character in the comic book Elfquest
- A Western character for DC Comics

== Royal Navy ==
- HMS Strongbow (1916), destroyer launched 1916, sunk 1917
- HMS Strongbow (P235), submarine launched 1943, broken up 1946

== Other ==
- Strongbow (cider)
