= Japanese minelayer Hatsutaka =

1939–1945 Imperial Japanese ship

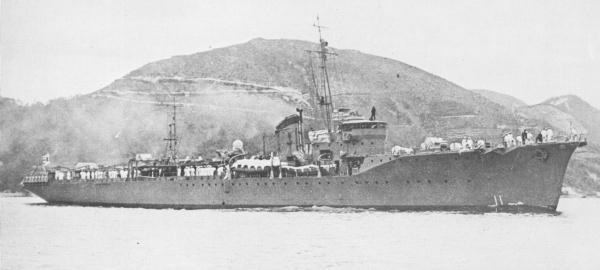
- Hatsutaka in 1939

History

Japan
- Name: Hatsutaka
- Ordered: fiscal 1937
- Builder: Harima Shipyard
- Laid down: 29 March 1938
- Launched: 28 April 1939
- Commissioned: 31 October 1939
- Stricken: 10 October 1944
- Fate: Sunk, 16 May 1945

General characteristics
- Type: Minelayer
- Displacement: 1,608 long tons (1,634 t) standard; 1,860 long tons (1,890 t) normal
- Length: 82.5 m (270 ft 8 in) pp, 86.5 m (283 ft 10 in) waterline
- Beam: 11.3 m (37 ft 1 in)
- Draught: 4 m (13 ft 1 in)
- Propulsion: 2-shaft geared turbine engine, 3 boilers, 600 hp (450 kW)
- Speed: 20 knots (37 km/h; 23 mph)
- Range: 3,000 nmi (5,600 km) at 14 knots (26 km/h; 16 mph)
- Complement: 199
- Electronic warfare & decoys: Type 22 and Type 13 radar; 1 × Type 93 active sonar; 1 × Type 93 hydrophone; and/or Type 3 sonar
- Armament: in 1939; 4 × QF 2 pounder naval gun; 18 × Type 95 depth charges; 1 × Type 94 depth charge projector; 4 × depth charge throwers; 24 × Type 96 510 m (1,673 ft 3 in) anti-submarine nets or 100 × Type 93 naval mines

Hatsutaka (初鷹, First Hawk) was the lead vessel in the Hatsutaka class of medium-sized minelayers of the Imperial Japanese Navy, which was in service during World War II. She was designed as an improved version of Shirataka anti-submarine netlayer. However, during the Pacific War, due to the critical shortage of escort patrol ships, she was fitted with depth charge racks, her minelaying rails were removed, and she was used primarily for convoy escort duties.

She was sunk in action by USS Hawkbill, losing 70 men.

== Background ==
Under the Maru-3 Supplemental Naval Armaments Budget of 1937, the Imperial Japanese Navy authorized a two vessels of a new class of minelayer (Project number H12) primarily for coastal duties. The new vessel was designed to carry either 100 Type 5 naval mines, or to function as a netlayer based on design features developed through operational experience with Shirataka.

Hatsutaka was launched by the Harima Shipyard near Kobe on 28 April 1939, and was commissioned into service on 31 October 1939.

== Operational history ==
After commissioning, Hatsutaka was assigned to the IJN 1st Fleet’s Second Base Force, but was reassigned to the IJN 3rd Fleet in April 1941, and to the Southwest Area Fleet's First Southern Expeditionary Fleet's Ninth Base Force based at Camranh Bay, French Indochina in October 1941.

After the attack on Pearl Harbor in December 1941, Hatsutaka was assigned to ”Operation T”, (the invasion of Sumatra), escorting 11 transports with the IJA 229th Infantry Regiment from French Indochina to Bangka and Palembang on 11 February, and the Imperial Guards Division from Singapore to northern Sumatra on 10 March. This mission was followed by ”Operation D” (the invasion of the Andaman Islands at the end of March, with Hatsutaka escorting a convoy from Singapore to Port Blair and Rangoon in Burma. Hatsutaka spent the remainder of 1942 and first half of 1943 based at Ambon in the Netherlands East Indies, operating between Ambon and Makassar.

On 15 July 1943 Hatsutaka rendezvoused with the German submarine U-511, carrying Vice Admiral Nomura Naokuni, Japan's representative to the Axis Tripartite Commission in Berlin since 1941, and Major Sugita Tamotsu of the IJA Medical Service, Dr. Ernst Wörmann, ambassador to Wang Jingwei's pro-Japanese Reorganized National Government of China and Martin Spahn, leader-designee of the NSDAP (Nazi) party in Japan and three engineers from U-boat builder AG Weser at Bremen Hatsutaka escorted the German submarine to Penang. For the remainder of 1943 and first half of 1944, Hatsutaka operated along the Sumatra coast between Padang, Medan, and Sabang.

On 19 April 1944 Hatsutaka was at Sabang when raided as part of Operation Cockpit, the first combined operation between the Royal Navy, Royal Australian Navy, French Navy, Royal Netherlands Navy, Royal New Zealand Navy, and United States Navy. Forty-six bombers (17 British, 29 American) and 37 fighters (13 British, 24 American) from HMS Illustrious and USS Saratoga raided Sabang, lightly damaging Hatsutaka, killing three crewmen and wounding five others. Hatsutaka was repaired at Singapore, and subsequently performed escort patrol duties between Singapore and Port Blair. On 3 August 1944, Hatsutaka struck a mine laid by HMS Truculent and was damaged.

Lieutenant Commander Ozaki Sakan assumed command of Hatsutaka in October 1944. On 13 January 1945 Hatsutaka participated in a 14-hour attack on HMS Strongbow with three other ships that rendered HMS Strongbow unfit for further service.

On 2 May 1945 Hatsutaka was escorting a tanker when attacked by USS Baya and USS Lagarto. At 2249, Hatsutaka detected Baya with her Type 22 radar and began closing. 2305, Baya fired two torpedoes at Hatsutaka, with both missing. At 2307, Hatsutaka opened fire on Baya with "20mm, 40mm, and 2 or 3 4.7 inch guns at a range of 1100 yards." and noted at 2308 that "Jap gunnery poor but plenty of it. Tracers passing down both sides of the periscope shears and overhead. 4.7 inch appeared to be both common and fused, as it was ricochetting [sic] alongside and over the stern as well as bursting overhead which was thought at first to be starshells." At 2309, Baya fired another three torpedoes, with Hatsutaka combing the tracks. When Hatsutaka turned on the searchlight at 2320, Baya submerged and fired another torpedo at her, missing again. At 2325, when Baya surfaced, she secured the searchlight and again commenced firing on Baya and dropped six depth charges at 2329, shaking Baya violently. At 2333, the range opened and Baya informed Lagarto that she had been driven off by the escort's gunfire. Baya noted that "It is nothing short of a miracle that we came through so much gunfire without a single hit. His deflection was as consistently on as his range was off."

Lagarto made contact with the convoy in a submerged attack at 1400 on 3 May. Japanese records indicate that Hatsutaka depth charged and sank Lagarto on 3 May. On 3 May at 2215 Baya again attempted to attack the convoy, but her own 10 cm radar was detected, alerting the convoy, which commenced evasive maneuvers. At 0011 on 4 May Baya fired six torpedoes, with no hits. At 0013, the convoy turned away, with Hatsutaka chasing Baya as she tried to get in another position to attack.

On 14 May Hatsutaka was escorting Tottori Maru. At 0737, USS Cobia fired five torpedoes at a ship misidentified as "Yaeyama", but missed. At 0745, Hatsutaka dropped six depth charges, followed by four more at 0755. At 1147, Hatsutaka sighted the periscope of Cobia, and launched nine depth charge runs, causing severe damage." At 1430, USS Hammerhead attacked Tottori Maru, but she evaded three torpedoes, and later that night at 2300, when Hammerhead was trying to get another shot in on Tottori Maru, Hatsutaka was always in the way. At 0021 on 15 May Hatsutaka opened fire on Hammerhead, scoring several near misses. Hatsutaka then returned to Singapore.

At 0523 on 16 May in rainy weather, USS Hawkbill fired six torpedoes at Hatsutaka, two of which hit, flooding her engine room. At 1044, Hawkbill fired three more torpedoes. Hatsutaka opened fire, but one torpedo struck amidships, causing an explosion, which broke her in half. Hatsutaka sank at 04°49′N 103°31′E at 11:15, with 70 crewmen killed in action.

Hatsutaka was removed from the navy list on 10 August 1945.

== Wreckage ==
On 28 March 2008 northwest of Pulau Tenggol, Malaysia a team of divers located Hatsutaka about one kilometer (0.62 mi) off shore.
