= Zwaardvisch-class submarine =

Class of diesel-electric submarines

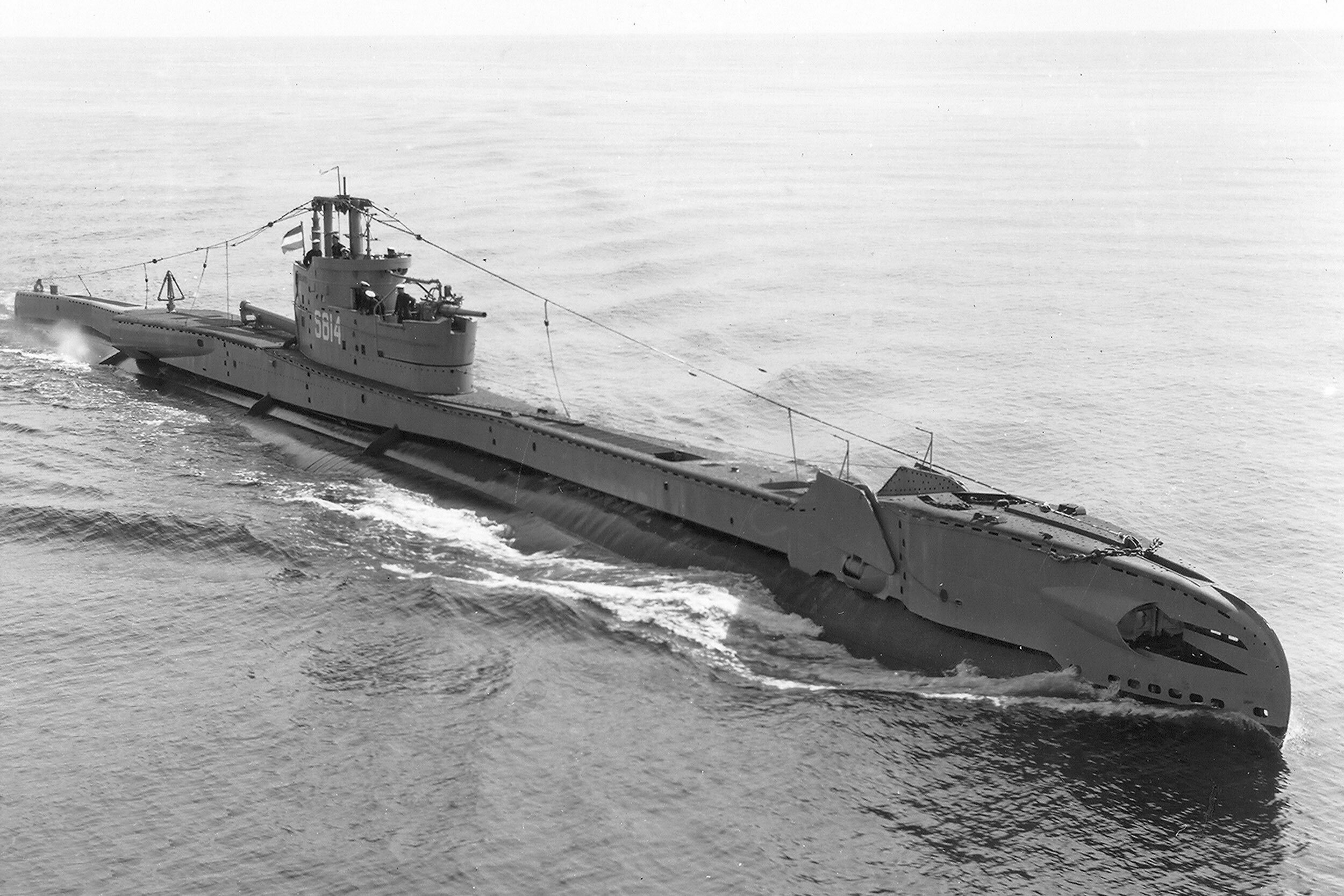
- HNLMS Zwaardvis

Class overview
- Name: Zwaardvisch class
- Builders: Vickers-Armstrongs, Barrow-in-Furness
- Operators: Royal Netherlands Navy
- Succeeded by: Dolfijn class
- In service: 1943–1965

General characteristics
- Type: Submarine
- Displacement: 1,320 tons surfaced; 1,580 tons submerged
- Length: 87.3 m (286 ft 5 in)
- Beam: 8.1 m (26 ft 7 in)
- Draught: 4.7 m (15 ft 5 in)
- Propulsion: 2 screws; 2 × 6-cylinder four-stroke Vickers diesel engines, 1,250 hp (932 kW) each; 2 × 900 hp (671 kW) electric motors; 3 × 112 cells batteries (5350 Ah)
- Speed: 15.5 kn (28.7 km/h; 17.8 mph) surfaced; 8.5 kn (15.7 km/h; 9.8 mph) submerged
- Test depth: 60 m (200 ft)
- Armament: 11 × 21 in (530 mm) torpedo tubes (8 bow, 3 stern); 1 x 10.3 cm (4.1 in) deck gun; 1 x 20 mm (0.79 in) machine gun; 19 torpedoes

The Zwaardvisch class was a class of initially two, and later four, submarines that served between 1943 and 1965 in the Royal Netherlands Navy (RNLN). They were former T-class submarines. Two were acquired and transferred to the RNLN during the Second World War, while another two were loaned from the Royal Navy post-war for a period of five years.

== Background ==
During the Second World War the Royal Netherlands Navy Submarine Service (OZD) re-evaluated in 1941 the state of its submarine fleet. It concluded that new submarines should be acquired to compensate the loss of HNLMS O 13 and HNLMS O 22 and to replace some older submarines that had become obsolete due their age. As a result in September 1941 a request was made to the British Admiralty to purchase three T- class submarines which were being built as part of a British building program that would be completed by 1942. This request was rejected as the Royal Navy needed these boats themselves, instead the Royal Netherlands Navy (RNLN) was offered two U-class submarines, which it accepted. Nevertheless, there was still a need for more submarines for the OZD and after the construction program of the T class was well underway in 1943, the Dutch government-in-exile made another request to the British Admiralty on April 1943 for the transfer of a T-class submarine. This time the request was approved and on 6 December 1943 HNLMS Zwaardvisch was taken into service. A year later, in 1944, the Dutch government started negotiations to acquire another T-class submarine. This request was also approved and on 6 April 1945 HNLMS Tijgerhaai was taken into service.

After the Second World War had ended the material of the OZD consisted mostly of old and worn-out submarines. While the RNLN made several plans to modernize the submarine fleet, it took many years till these plans resulted in the construction and commissioning of new submarines. In the meanwhile the RNLN tried to loan some of the surplus submarines that allies such as the United Kingdom (UK) and United States had. In 1947 this led to the UK loaning two T-class submarines to the Netherlands for a duration of five years. The two loaned submarines were during their service in the RNLN also considered part of the Zwaardvisch class.

== Design ==
All four submarines of the Zwaardvisch class were built in the United Kingdom at the shipyard of Vickers-Armstrongs in Barrow-in-Furness. The boats had a displacement of 1,320 tons on the surface and 1,580 tons submerged. When it came to measurements, they had a length of 87.3 metres (286 ft 5 in), a beam of 8.1 metres (26 ft 7 in) and a draught of 4.7 metres (15 ft 5 in). The boats had a diving depth of 60 metres (200 ft). They were considered less advanced than the O 21-class submarines.

=== Armament ===
The primary armament of the Zwaardvisch-class submarines consisted of eleven 53.3-centimetre (21.0 in) torpedo tubes; eight were located at the bow and three at the stern. Of the eight torpedo tubes at the bow six were installed internally and two externally, while all three at the stern were located externally. Furthermore, the boats could carry a total of 19 torpedoes, with eleven torpedoes being placed inside the torpedo tubes and a further eight for reloads. Besides torpedo tubes, the boats were also equipped with a single 10.3-centimetre (4.1 in) deck gun and a single 20 mm (0.79 in) machine gun.

=== Propulsion ===
The Zwaardvisch-class submarines were equipped with two six-cylinder four-stroke Vickers diesel engines that could each produce 1,250 horsepower (930 kW) (combined 2,500 hp, 1,900 kW) and drive the two screws of the submarine to a maximum surface speed of 15.5 knots (28.7 km/h; 17.8 mph). Besides the two diesel engines, the submarines also had two electric motors that each could produce 900 hp (670 kW) and three banks of 112-cell batteries with a capacity of 5,350 Ah. This allowed the submarines to operate solely on electric power for five hours. The maximum speed underwater was 8.5 knots (15.7 km/h; 9.8 mph). The Zwaarvisch-class submarines were also fitted with snorkels.

== Service history ==
=== Second World War ===
The only submarine who saw action during the Second World War was HNLMS Zwaardvisch. During the war the submarine completed several successful war patrols and managed to sink six ships, including the Japanese minelayer Itsukushima and the German submarine U-168. The boat was also used for Secret Inter Service (SIS) and Special Operations Executive (SOE) operations. As a result of its accomplishments, Zwaardvisch is considered one of the most successful Dutch submarines during the later part of the Second World War in the Pacific theater. While HNLMS Tijgerhaai was also commissioned during the war, it saw no action due to entering service a few months before it ended.

=== Post-war ===
After the Second World War both submarines returned to the Netherlands and were stationed at the Waalhaven Submarine Base. While the submarines were not involved in the Indonesian War of Independence and were regularly put in conservation, they did make patrols from time to time. In 1948 the HNLMS Dolfijn and Zeehond also became part of the Zwaardvisch class, after the United Kingdom agreed to lent these two submarines for a period of five years to the Netherlands. That same year Dolfijn made history by becoming the first submarine to cross the Atlantic Ocean using its snorkel. In March 1950 Dolfijn left for the Arctic Ocean as part of Operation IJsco. The purpose of the trip was to check how the crew and submarine would perform in cold and icy waters. After six weeks the boat returned to the Waalhaven Submarine Base and the conclusion was that submarines of the Zwaardvisch class were not suitable for operations in the northern waters.

== Notes ==
=== Bibliography ===
- Blackman, Raymond V.B., ed. (1953). Jane's Fighting Ships 1953-54. London: Sampson Low, Marston & Co.
- Bosscher, Ph.M.; Bussemaker, H.O. (2007). Gelouterd door strijd: De Nederlandse Onderzeedienst tot de val van Java, 1942 (in Dutch). Amsterdam: De Bataafsche Leeuw. ISBN 978-90-6707-614-2.
- de Bles, Harry; Boven, Graddy; Homburg, Leon (2006). Onderzeeboten! (in Dutch). Zaltbommel: Aprilis. ISBN 978-90-5994-130-4.
- Gardiner, Robert; Chumbley, Stephen; Budzbon, Przemysław, eds. (1995). Conway's All the World's Fighting Ships 1947–1995. Annapolis: Naval Institute Press. ISBN 1-55750-132-7.
- Jalhay, P.C. (1982). Nederlandse Onderzeedienst 75 jaar (in Dutch). Bussum: De Boer Maritiem. ISBN 90-228-1864-0.
- Karreman, Jaime (2017). Spionage-operaties van Nederlandse onderzeeboten van 1968 tot 1991 (in Dutch). Amsterdam: BWV Media. ISBN 978-90-826995-0-0.
- Lenton, H.T. (1968). Royal Netherlands Navy. Navies of the Second World War. London: Macdonald.
- Mark, Chris (1997). Schepen van de Koninklijke Marine in W.O. II (in Dutch). Alkmaar: De Alk. ISBN 90-6013-522-9.
- Nooteboom, S.G. (2001). Deugdelijke schepen: marinescheepsbouw 1945-1995 (in Dutch). Zaltbommel: Europese Bibliotheek. ISBN 90-288-2637-8.
- Raven, G.J.A., ed. (1988). De kroon op het anker: 175 jaar Koninklijke Marine (in Dutch). Amsterdam: De Bataafsche Leeuw. ISBN 90-6707-200-1.
- Schoonoord, D.C.L. (2012). Pugno pro patria: de Koninklijke Marine tijdens de Koude Oorlog (in Dutch). Franeker: Van Wijnen. ISBN 978-90-5194-455-6.
- van Amstel, W.H.E. (1991). De schepen van de Koninklijke Marine vanaf 1945 (in Dutch). Alkmaar: De Alk. ISBN 90-6013-997-6.
- van Willigenburg, Henk (2010). Dutch Warships of World War II. Emmen: Lanasta. ISBN 978-90-8616-318-2.
- von Münching, L.L. (1978). Schepen van de Koninklijke Marine in de Tweede Wereldoorlog (in Dutch). Alkmaar: Alk. ISBN 90-6013-903-8.
- Woudstra, F.G.A. (1982). Onze Koninklijke Marine (in Dutch). Alkmaar: De Alk. ISBN 90-6013-915-1.
