= HNLMS Zwaardvisch =

Submarine of the Royal Netherlands Navy

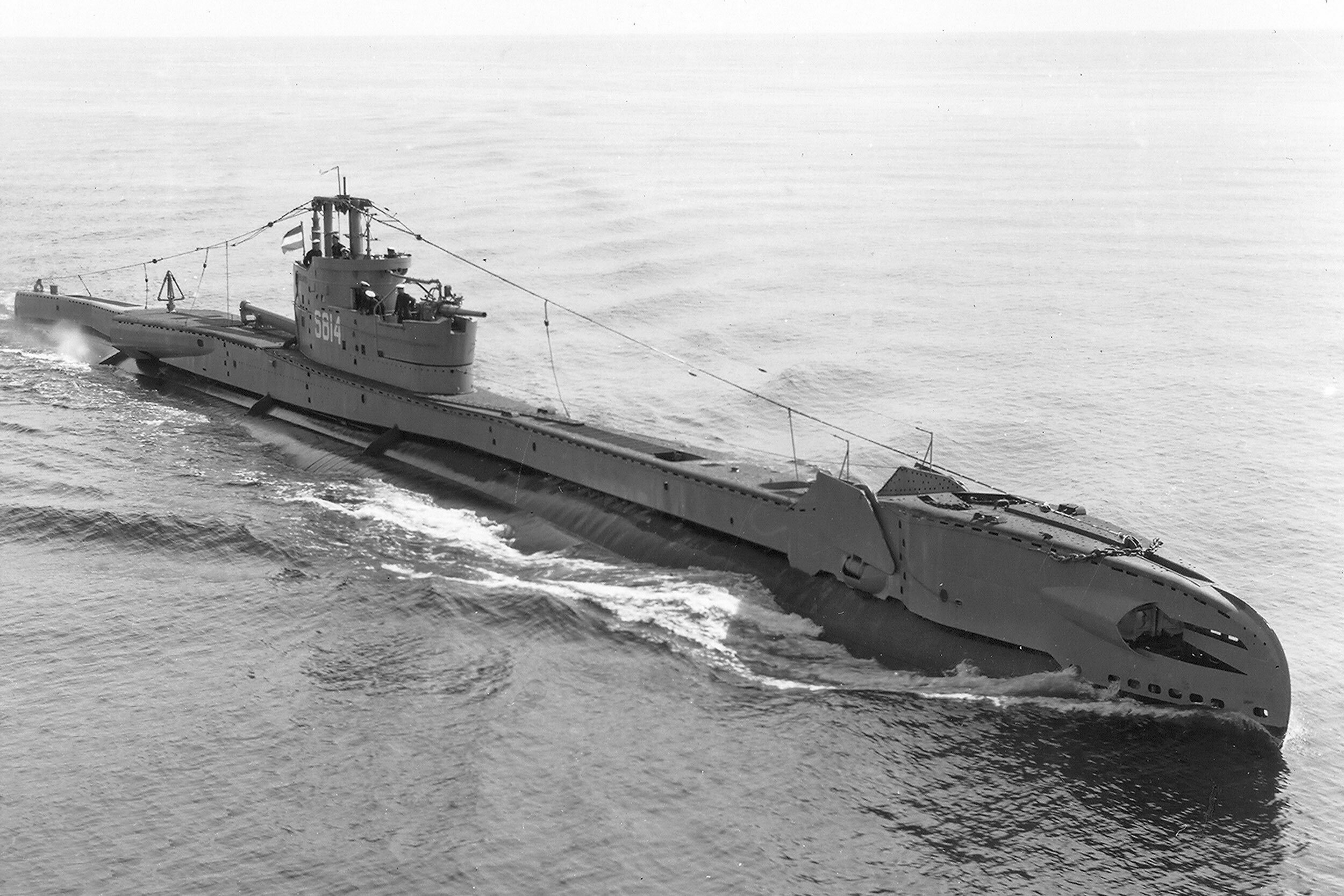
- HNLMS Zwaardvis during her post-war service

History

United Kingdom
- Name: HMS Talent
- Builder: Vickers-Armstrongs, Barrow
- Laid down: 13 October 1942
- Launched: 17 July 1943
- Fate: Transferred to the Royal Netherlands Navy on 23 March 1943

Netherlands
- Name: HNLMS Zwaardvisch
- Commissioned: 23 November 1943
- Decommissioned: 11 December 1962
- Renamed: Zwaardvis in 1950
- Fate: Sold for scrapping 12 July 1963

General characteristics
- Class & type: T-class/Zwaardvisch-class submarine
- Displacement: 1,290 tons surfaced; 1,560 tons submerged
- Length: 276 ft 6 in (84.28 m)
- Beam: 25 ft 6 in (7.77 m)
- Draught: 12 ft 9 in (3.89 m) forward; 14 ft 7 in (4.45 m) aft
- Propulsion: Two shafts; Twin diesel engines 2,500 hp (1,900 kW) each; Twin electric motors 1,450 hp (1,080 kW) each
- Speed: 15.5 kn (28.7 km/h; 17.8 mph) surfaced; 9 kn (17 km/h; 10 mph) submerged
- Range: 4,500 nmi (8,300 km; 5,200 mi) at 11 kn (20 km/h; 13 mph) surfaced
- Test depth: 300 ft (91 m) max
- Complement: 61
- Armament: 6 internal forward-facing 21 inch (533 mm) torpedo tubes; 2 external amidships rear-facing torpedo tubes; 1 external rear-facing torpedo tubes; 6 reload torpedoes; QF 4 inch (100 mm) deck gun; 3 anti aircraft machine guns

HNLMS Zwaardvisch (S814) was the lead ship of the Royal Netherlands Navy's Zwaardvisch-class submarine, which was based on the British T class. The submarine was originally ordered as HMS Talent (P322) and built by Vickers-Armstrongs, Barrow. It served mainly in the Pacific against the Japanese during the war, operating under both British and US operational command in Ceylon and Australia. In 1950, the vessel was renamed HNLMS Zwaardvis. She was sold and broken up for scrap in 1963.

== Design and description ==
Zwaardvisch was 276 ft 6 in (84.28 m) long, had a beam of 25 ft 6 in (7.77 m) and a draught of 12 ft 9 in (3.89 m) forward and 14 ft 7 in (4.45 m) aft. She displaced 1,290 tons surfaced and 1,560 tons submerged. Powered by twin 2,500 horsepower (1,900 kW) diesel engines, and twin 1,450 horsepower (1,080 kW) electric motors, the submarine was capable of achieving 15.5 knots (28.7 km/h; 17.8 mph) while surfaced and 9 knots (17 km/h; 10 mph) submerged. She had a range of 4,500 nautical miles (8,300 km; 5,200 mi) at 11 knots (20 km/h; 13 mph) surfaced, and could submerge 300 ft (91 m). She had a complement of 61 personnel and was armed with six internal forward-facing 21 inch (533 mm) torpedo tubes, two external forward-facing torpedo tubes, two external amidships rear-facing torpedo tubes, one external rear-facing torpedo tubes, six reload torpedoes, a single QF 4 inch (100 mm) deck gun and three anti-aircraft machine guns.

== Operational history ==
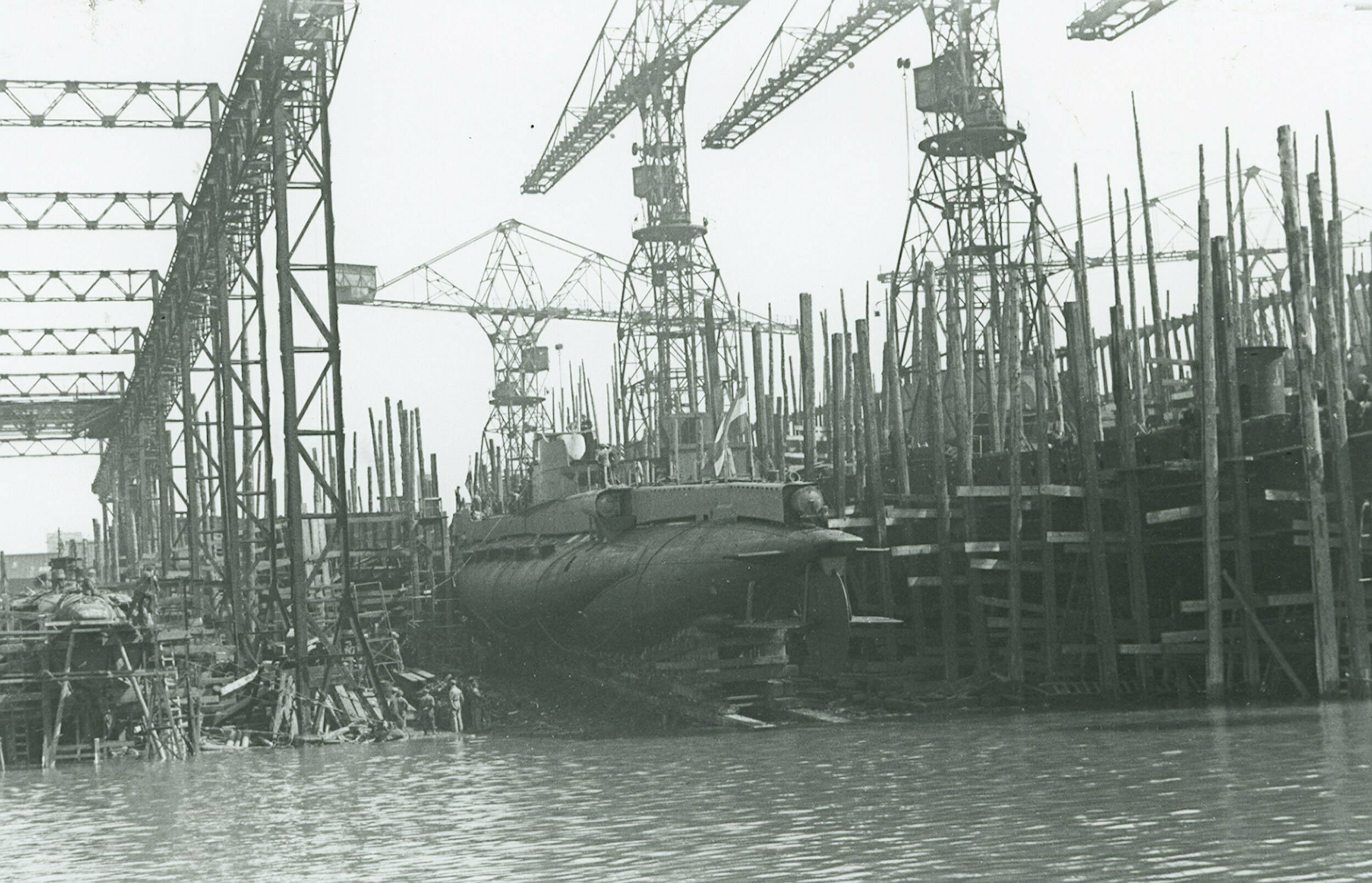
The completed Zwaardvisch is prepared for launch at the Vickers-Armstrongs naval yard in Barrow-in-Furness England, July 1943.

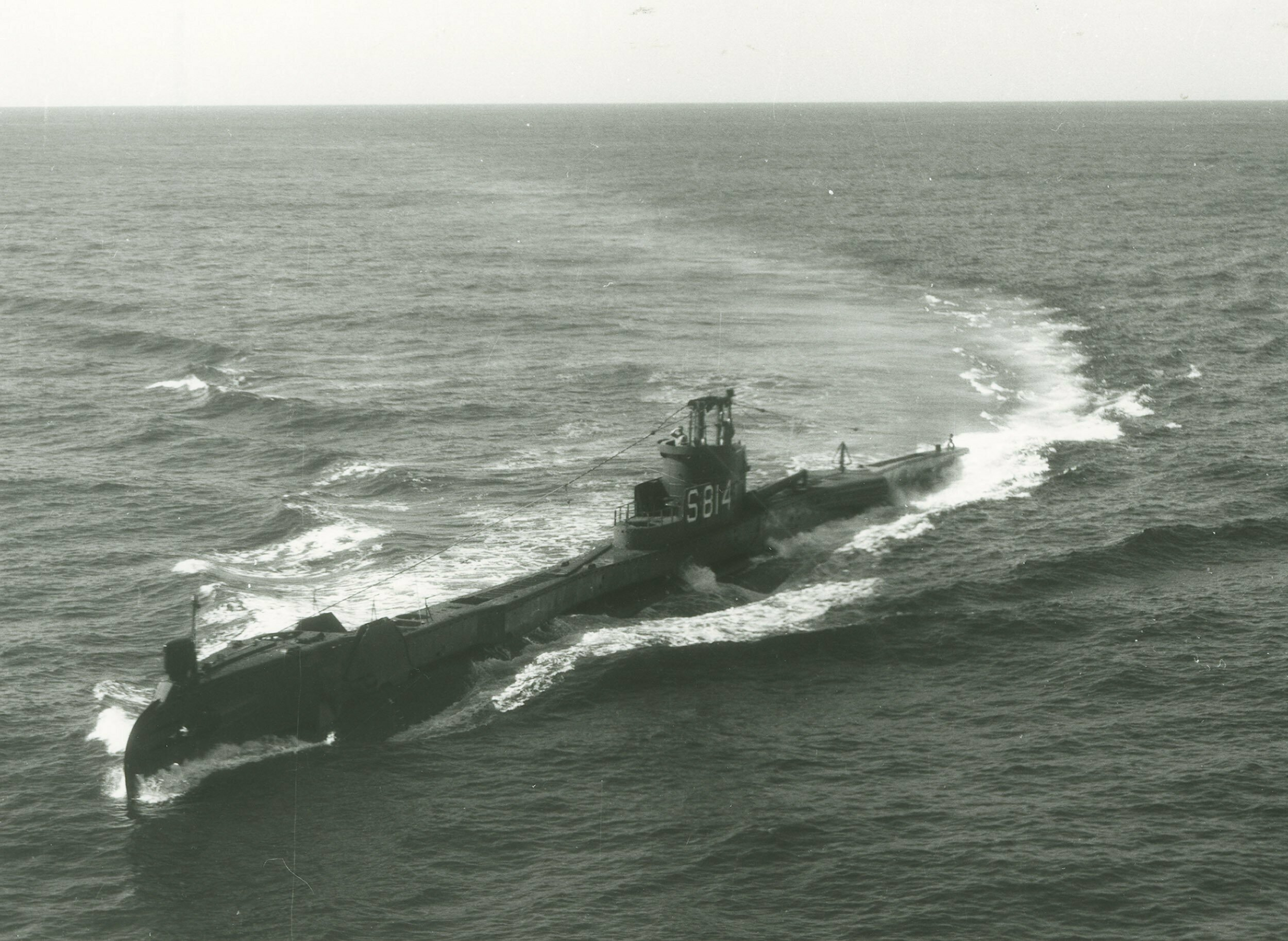
The renamed Zwaardvis manoeuvring at sea

The submarine was laid down on 13 October 1942 and built by Vickers Armstrong, of Barrow. She was launched on 17 July 1943 as HMS Talent, but was not commissioned into the Royal Navy, instead being transferred to the Royal Netherlands Navy on 23 March 1943, and commissioned into service on 23 November 1943. She was renamed Zwaardvisch, Dutch for "Swordfish". She went on to lead a distinguished career.

Under the command of Lieutenant Hendrikus Goossens, Zwaardvisch moved to Rothesay the following month and began sea trials based out of Holy Loch until February 1944. Throughout late February and into March, the submarine undertook patrols into the Atlantic and then off the coast of Norway. Later, she attempted to find the German battleship Tirpitz before returning to Dundee. A patrol to the Portuguese coast followed in May, after which she put into Gibraltar, where orders transferring the vessel to the Far East were received. Arriving in Trincomalee, Ceylon, in July 1944, Zwaardvisch came under the operational control of the British Far East Fleet, and conducted a patrol through the Strait of Malacca, during which time she attacked several ships, including Kim Hup Soen and two Malaysian sailing vessels, mainly with her deck gun.

Assigned to the British 8th Submarine Flotilla, Zwaardvisch operated out of Fremantle, Western Australia, after September 1944, at which time she was placed under the operational command of the US fleet. In October, she also sank the Japanese guard boat Koei Maru, the Japanese oceanographic research vessel Kaiyō No.2 and the Japanese minelayer Itsukushima. She also damaged the Japanese minelayer Wakataka. On 6 October 1944, she sank the German submarine U-168 with a spread of six torpedoes, hitting the U-168 twice, one torpedo detonating in the U-168's forward torpedo room. The submarine had been on a patrol around Java when she received directions via radio to establish an ambush off Surabaya, where she subsequently torpedoed and sank U-168, which had been on its way to Japan to transfer important military technologies. Afterwards it rescued some survivors of the U-168.

The final months of the war were spent in the South China Sea attacking Japanese merchantmen, and patrolling the Lombok Strait. In February 1945, Zwaardvisch was attacked and damaged by a Japanese aircraft and had to return to Fremantle the following month for repairs. Once these were complete, she returned to the Java Sea under the command of Lieutenant Jan van Dapperen, where she made further attacks on Japanese merchantmen throughout April and May before returning to Fremantle to repair faulty communications and weapons systems. Following the surrender of Germany in early May, the submarine returned to Britain to undertake further repairs in Dundee before transferring to Rotterdam in August 1945.

Apart from a voyage to the Dutch West Indies in 1947, she had a relatively quiet postwar career, being renamed Zwaardvis in 1950. She was decommissioned on 11 December 1962, and was sold to be broken up for scrap on 12 July 1963.
