= Hatsutaka-class minelayer =

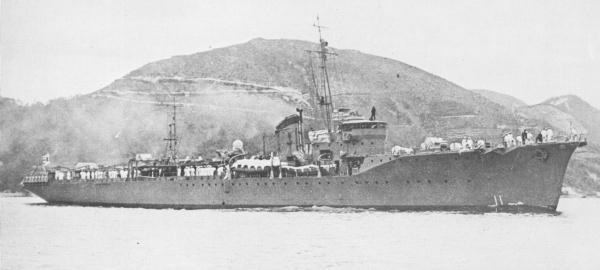
- Hatsutaka in 1939

Class overview
- Name: Hatsutaka-class minelayers; Hatsutaka-class; Wakataka-class; Asadori-class (only a project)
- Builders: Harima Zōsen Corporation
- Operators: Imperial Japanese Navy; Royal Malaysian Navy; Republic of Singapore Navy
- Preceded by: Shirataka
- Cost: 4,733,000 JPY (Hatsutaka); 4,900,000 JPY (Wakataka)
- Built: 1938 – 1941
- In commission: 1939 – 1946 (IJN)
- Planned: 4
- Completed: 3
- Canceled: 1
- Lost: 2
- Retired: 1

General characteristics
- Type: Minelayer/Netlayer
- Displacement: 1,600 long tons (1,626 t) standard
- Length: 91.00 m (298 ft 7 in) overall; 86.50 m (283 ft 10 in) waterline
- Beam: 11.30 m (37 ft 1 in)
- Draught: 4.0 m (13 ft 1 in)
- Propulsion: 2 × Kampon geared turbines; 3 × Kampon coal/oil-fired boilers; 2 shafts, 6,000 shp
- Speed: 20.0 knots (23.0 mph; 37.0 km/h)
- Range: 3,000 nmi (5,600 km) at 14 kn (16 mph; 26 km/h)
- Complement: Hatsutaka and Aotaka; 199; Wakataka; 202
- Armament: Hatsutaka, 1939; 4 × 40 mm heavy machine guns; 18 × Type 95 depth charges; 1 × Type 94 depth charge projector; 4 × depth charge throwers; 1 × Type 93 active sonar; 1 × Type 93 hydrophone; 24 × Type 96 510 m (1,673 ft 3 in) anti-submarine nets or 100 × Type 93 naval mines; Wakataka, 1941; 2 × 76.2 mm (3.00 in) L/40 AA guns; 4 × Type 93 13.2 mm (0.52 in) AA guns; 18 × Type 95 depth charges; 1 × Type 94 depth charge projector; 4 × depth charge throwers; 1 × Type 93 active sonar; 1 × Type 93 hydrophone; 24 × Type 96 510 m (1,673 ft 3 in) anti-submarine nets or 100 × Type 93 naval mines

The Hatsutaka-class minelayer (初鷹型敷設艦,, Hatsutaka-gata Fusetsukan) was a class of minelayers of the Imperial Japanese Navy (IJN), serving during World War II. There were three sub-classes, as well.

== Design ==
- The Hastutaka-class minelayer was a reinforced model of the Shirataka. The Harima Zōsen Corporation dealt with all of the Hatsutaka-class.

== Ships in classes ==
=== Hatsutaka-class ===
- Project number was H12. First production model of the Hatsutaka-class. Two vessels were built in 1938-40 under the Maru 3 Programme (Ship # 7 - 8). They were equipped with 4 × 40 mm quick-firing guns for anti-submarine warfare.

Ship #	Ship	Laid down	Launched	Completed	Fate
7	Hatsutaka (初鷹)	29 March 1938	28 April 1939	31 October 1939	Sunk by USS Hawkbill at South China Sea 04°54′N 103°28′E on 16 May 1945.
8	Aotaka (蒼鷹)	10 May 1939	3 February 1940	30 June 1940	Sunk by USS Pargo at north of Jesselton 07°00′N 116°00′E on 26 September 1944.

=== Wakataka-class ===
- Project number was H12B. Second production model of the Hatsutaka-class. Only 1 vessel was built under the Maru 4 Programme (Ship # 102). She was equipped with 2 × 76.2 mm (3.00 in) anti-aircraft cannons. The Wakataka was classed in the Hatsutaka-class in the IJN official documents. The IJN called her the Modified Hatsutaka-class (改初鷹型,, Kai Hatsutaka-gata) unofficially.

Ship #	Ship	Laid down	Launched	Completed	Fate
102	Wakataka (若鷹)	15 November 1940	12 July 1941	30 November 1941	Decommissioned on 1 March 1946. Surrendered to United Kingdom on 17 October 1947. Transferred to Federation of Malaya, and renamed Laburnum. Surrendered to Republic of Singapore in 1968. Later, nothing more was heard.

=== Asadori-class ===
- Project number was H12C. The Navy Technical Department revised the Wakataka drawings. Only 1 vessel was planned under the Kai-Maru 5 Programme (Ship # 5039). The IJN called her the Modified Wakataka-class (改若鷹型,, Kai Wakataka-gata) unofficially.

Ship #	Ship	Laid down	Launched	Completed	Fate
5039	Asadori (朝鳥)				Cancelled on 5 May 1944.

== Photos ==
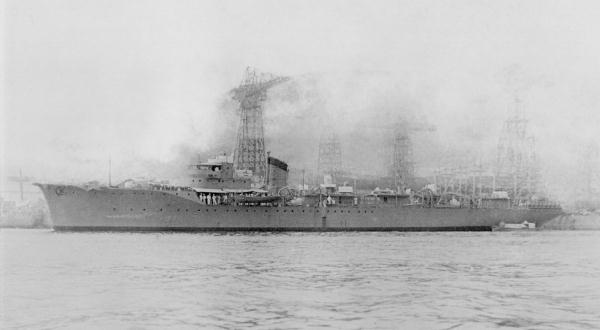
Aotaka in June 1940 at Harima Zōsen.

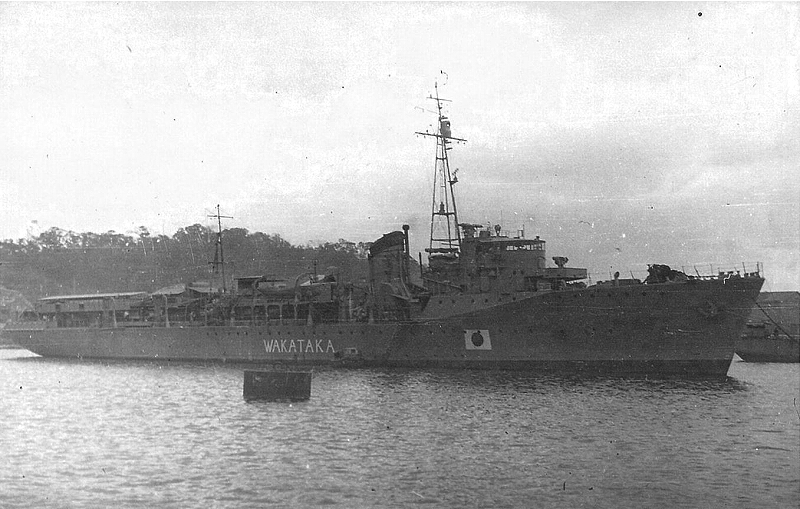
Wakataka as repatriation transport in Spring 1947 at Sasebo Naval Base.

== See also ==
- Japanese minelayer Shirataka

== Bibliography ==
- Ships of the World special issue Vol.47, Auxiliary Vessels of the Imperial Japanese Navy, "Kaijinsha"., (Japan), March 1997
- Model Art Extra No.360, Drawings of Imperial Japanese Naval Vessels Part-2, "Model Art Co. Ltd". Archived from the original on 2012-06-05. (Japan), October 1989
- The Maru Special, Japanese Naval Vessels No.42, Japanese minelayers, "Ushio Shobō". (Japan), August 1980
- Daiji Katagiri, Ship Name Chronicles of the Imperial Japanese Navy Combined Fleet, Kōjinsha (Japan), June 1988, ISBN 4-7698-0386-9
