= Japanese minelayer Aotaka =

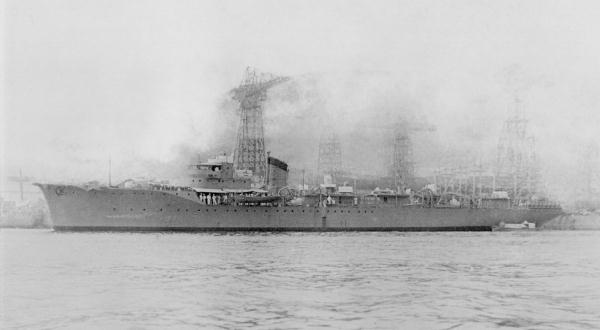
- Aotaka in 1940

History

Empire of Japan
- Name: Aotaka
- Ordered: fiscal 1937
- Builder: Harima Shipyard
- Laid down: May 10, 1938
- Launched: February 3, 1940
- Commissioned: June 30, 1940
- Stricken: November 10, 1944
- Fate: Sunk, 26 September 1944

General characteristics
- Type: Minelayer
- Displacement: 1,608 long tons (1,634 t) standard; 1,860 long tons (1,890 t) normal
- Length: 82.5 m (271 ft) pp, 86.5 m (284 ft) waterline
- Beam: 11.3 m (37 ft 1 in)
- Draught: 4 m (13 ft 1 in)
- Propulsion: 2-shaft geared turbine engine, 3 boilers, 6,000 hp (4,500 kW)
- Speed: 20 knots (23 mph; 37 km/h)
- Range: 3,000 nmi (5,600 km) at 14 knots (26 km/h)
- Complement: 199
- Electronic warfare & decoys: Type 22 and 13 radars and Type 93 and/or Type 3 sonar
- Armament: in 1939; 4 × 40 mm heavy machine guns; 18 × Type 95 depth charges; 1 × Type 94 depth charge projector; 4 × depth charge throwers; 1 × Type 93 active sonar; 1 × Type 93 hydrophone; 24 × Type 96 510 m (1,673 ft 3 in) anti-submarine nets or 100 × Type 93 naval mines

Aotaka (蒼鷹, Blue Hawk) was the second vessel in the Hatsutaka class of medium-sized minelayers of the Imperial Japanese Navy, which was in service during World War II. She was designed as an improved version of the netlayer Shirataka. However, during the Pacific War, due to the critical shortage of patrol ships for convoy escort duties, she was fitted with depth charge racks and her minelaying rails were removed.

== Building ==
Under the Maru-3 Supplemental Armaments Budget of 1937, the Imperial Japanese Navy authorized a two vessels of a new class of minelayer (Project number H12) primarily for coastal duties. The new vessel was designed to carry either 100 Type 5 naval mines, or to function as a netlayer based on design features developed through operational experience with Shirataka.

Aotaka was launched by the Harima Shipyard near Kobe on February 3, 1940, and was commissioned into service on June 30, 1940.

== Operational history ==
After commissioning, Aotaka was assigned to the Maizuru Naval District, but was soon reassigned to become flagship of the First Second Base Force of the IJN 2nd Fleet. On March 23, 1941, she was assigned to patrols of the central China coastline. On April 10, 1941, Aotaka was reassigned to the IJN 3rd Fleet, and continued its deployment on the China coast through the end of November.

At the time of the Attack on Pearl Harbor in December 1941, Aotaka was assigned to "Operation M", (the invasion of the northern Philippines), escorting several convoys of transports between the Japanese home islands, Palau and landing zones in the Philippines.

In January 1942, Aotaka was assigned to ”Operation H” (the invasion of the Celebes in the Netherlands East Indies), supporting landings at Kendari and Makassar, and later supporting ”Operation J”, the invasion Java and Bali. On March 10, Aotaka was reassigned to the Second Southern Expeditionary Fleet, spending much of the rest of the year escorting convoys between Surabaya, and Singapore, from its base at Makassar.

In January 1943, Aotaka escorted the damaged Japanese cruiser Natori from Ambon to Makassar for repairs, and unsuccessfully attacked the submarine USS Tautog with depth charges on January 23. Aotaka continued with escort and patrol operations between Makassar, Singapore and Surabaya until reassigned to the Southwest Area Fleet on July 30, when her zone of operations was shifted to Halmahera Island, the Moluccas and Makassar to mid-1944. On May 16, she suffered minor damage after striking a magnetic mine at Halmahera.

On June 3, Aotaka departed Singapore with a convoy bound for Moji, Kitakyūshū. The convoy was attacked by USS Raton on June 6, but Aotaka was undamaged, and reached Maizuru Naval Arsenal for repairs on July 23. On September 1, Aotaka escorted a convoy from Mako to Manila. After arriving safely, on September 21, approximately 200 aircraft from United States Navy Task Force 38 raided Manila Bay; however, Aotaka avoided any damage. Aotaka then escorted a large convoy from Manila Bay to the presumed safety of Coron Bay at Busuanga Island, Palawan on September 23. The following morning, the anchorage was attacked by 96 F6F Hellcat and 24 SB2C Helldiver aircraft from the aircraft carriers USS Intrepid, USS Cabot and USS Lexington. Aotaka escaped from the ambush, but was spotted on September 26 by the submarine USS Pargo approximately 90 kilometers (56 mi) west of North Borneo. Aotaka sank at 07°00′N 116°00′E.

Aotaka was removed from the navy list on 10 November 1944.
