= HMS H32 =

Submarine of the Royal Navy

- HMS H32

History

United Kingdom
- Name: HMS H32
- Builder: Vickers Limited, Barrow-in-Furness
- Laid down: 20 April 1917
- Launched: 19 November 1918
- Commissioned: 14 May 1919
- Fate: Sold, 18 October 1944

General characteristics
- Class & type: H-class submarine
- Displacement: 423 long tons (430 t) surfaced; 510 long tons (518 t) submerged
- Length: 171 ft 0 in (52.12 m)
- Beam: 15 ft 4 in (4.67 m)
- Propulsion: 1 × 480 hp (358 kW) diesel engine; 2 × 620 hp (462 kW) electric motors
- Speed: 11.5 knots (21.3 km/h; 13.2 mph) surfaced; 9 knots (17 km/h; 10 mph) submerged
- Range: 2,985 nmi (5,528 km) at 7.5 kn (13.9 km/h; 8.6 mph) surfaced; 130 nmi (240 km) at 2 kn (3.7 km/h; 2.3 mph) submerged
- Complement: 22
- Armament: 4 × 21 in (533 mm) bow torpedo tubes; 8 × 21 inch torpedoes

HMS H32 was a H-class submarine constructed for the Royal Navy. The submarine entered service in 1919 and served in the Second World War, one of only seven of the 42 H-class submarines to do so. During Warship Week 1942 H32 was adopted by Lydney RDC (Gloucestershire). The submarine was sold for scrap in 1944.

== Design ==
Like all post-H20 H-class submarines, H32 had a displacement of 423 long tons (430 t) at the surface and 510 long tons (520 t) while submerged. The submarine had a length overall of 171 feet 9 inches (52.35 m), a beam of 15 feet 9 inches (4.80 m), and a draught of 13 feet 2 inches (4.01 m). The submarine was driven by a two-shaft diesel engine providing a total power of 480 horsepower (360 kW) and two electric motors each providing 620 horsepower (460 kW) power, for a speed of 11 knots (20 km/h; 13 mph). The submarine would normally carry 16.4 long tons (16.7 t) of fuel and had a maximum capacity of 18 long tons (18 t).

The submarine had a maximum surface speed of 13 knots (24 km/h; 15 mph) and a submerged speed of 10.5 knots (19.4 km/h; 12.1 mph). Post-H20 H-class submarines had ranges of 2,985 nautical miles (5,528 km; 3,435 mi) at speeds of 7.5 knots (13.9 km/h; 8.6 mph) when surfaced. H32 was fitted with an anti-aircraft gun, and four 21-inch (533 mm) torpedo tubes fitted to the bow, with eight 21-inch torpedoes carried. The design was based on the Holland 602 type submarine, altered to meet Royal Navy specifications. The submarine had a complement of twenty-two crew members.

== Construction and career ==
H32 was built by Vickers Limited, Barrow-in-Furness. She was laid down on 20 April 1917, launched on 19 November 1918, and commissioned on 14 May 1919.

Upon commissioning, HMS H32 was assigned to be a tender to the submarine depot ship HMS Maidstone. The submarine was also the first Royal Navy boat to be fitted with the ASDIC (Anti Submarine Detector Investigation Committee) underwater sensor system. At the onset of the Second World War, H32 was a member of the 6th Submarine Flotilla. From 26 to 29 August 1939, the flotilla deployed to its war bases at Dundee and Blyth. Beginning on 22 March 1941, the Royal Navy and Allies began deploying submarines off Brest, France to prevent the German battleships Gneisenau and Scharnhorst from leaving port. H32 was among the submarines assigned to the patrol.

HMS H32 was sold for scrap at Troon on 18 October 1944.

== See also ==
- List of submarines of the Second World War

== Bibliography ==
- Colledge, J. J.; Warlow, Ben (2006) [1969]. Ships of the Royal Navy: The Complete Record of All Fighting Ships of the Royal Navy from the 15th Century to the Present (3rd Rev ed.). London: Chatham Publishing. ISBN 978-1-86176-281-8. OCLC 67375475.
- Hutchinson, Robert (2001). Jane's submarines : war beneath the waves from 1776 to the present day. London: HarperCollins. ISBN 9780007105588.
- Rohwer, Jürgen (2005). Chronology of the War at Sea 1939–1945: The Naval History of World War Two (Revised & Expanded ed.). Annapolis, Maryland: Naval Institute Press. ISBN 1-59114-119-2.
- Walters, Derek (2004). The History of the British 'U' Class Submarine. Casemate Publishers. ISBN 978-1-84415-131-8.
