= HNLMS Tijgerhaai (P336) =

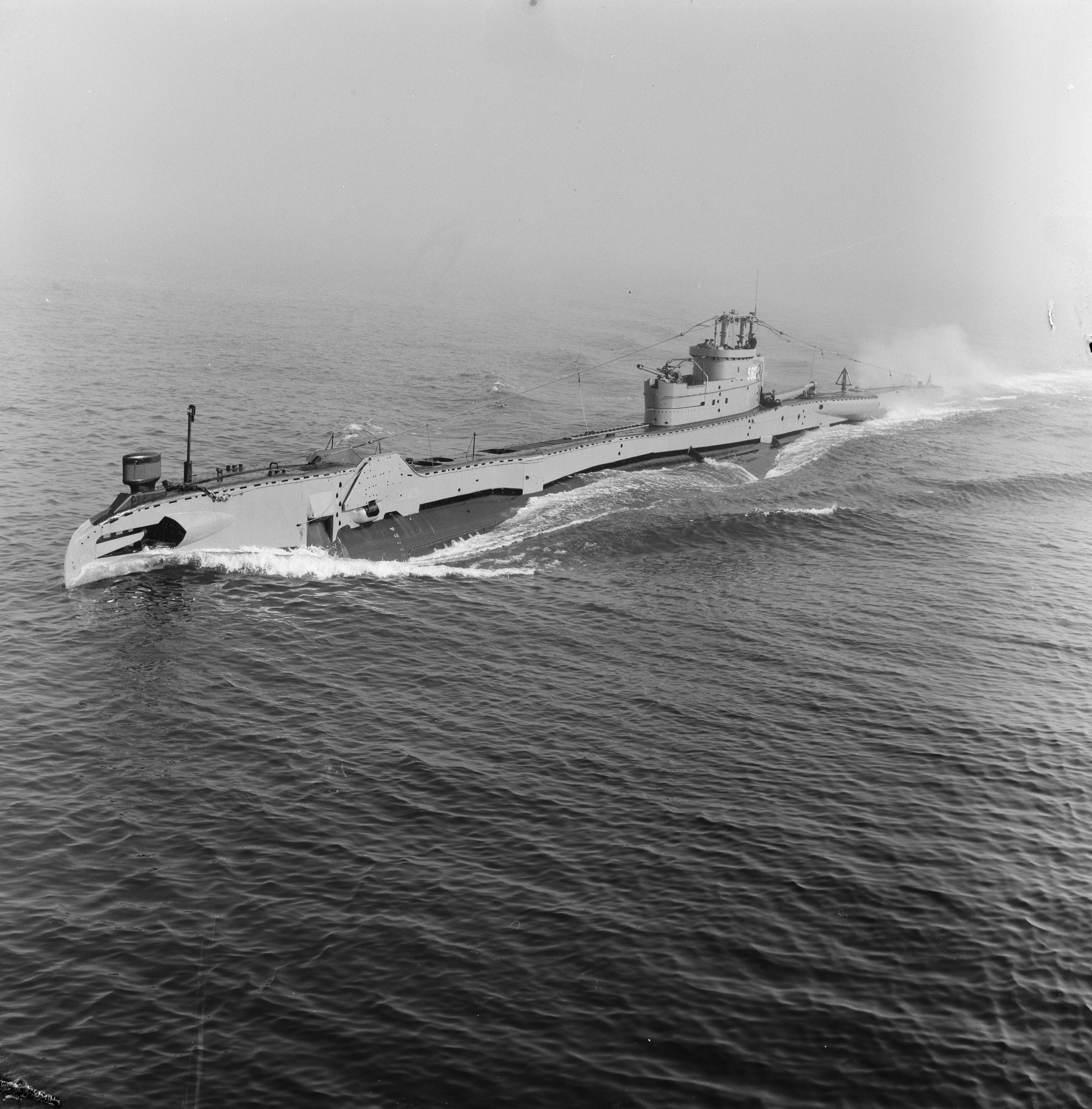
- Tijgerhaai in 1957

History

United Kingdom
- Name: HMS Tarn
- Builder: Vickers-Armstrongs, Barrow
- Laid down: 12 June 1943
- Launched: 29 November 1944
- Fate: Transferred to the Royal Netherlands Navy

Netherlands
- Name: HNLMS Tijgerhaai
- Commissioned: 28 March 1945
- Decommissioned: 11 November 1964
- Fate: Sold for scrapping 5 November 1965

General characteristics
- Class & type: T-class/Zwaardvisch-class submarine
- Displacement: 1,290 tons surfaced; 1,560 tons submerged
- Length: 276 ft 6 in (84.28 m)
- Beam: 25 ft 6 in (7.77 m)
- Draught: 12 ft 9 in (3.89 m) forward; 14 ft 7 in (4.45 m) aft
- Propulsion: Two shafts; Twin diesel engines 2,500 hp (1,900 kW) each; Twin electric motors 1,450 hp (1,080 kW) each
- Speed: 15.5 kn (28.7 km/h; 17.8 mph) surfaced; 9 kn (17 km/h; 10 mph) submerged
- Range: 4,500 nmi (8,300 km; 5,200 mi) at 11 kn (20 km/h; 13 mph) surfaced
- Test depth: 300 ft (91 m) max
- Complement: 61
- Armament: 6 internal forward-facing 21 inch (533 mm) torpedo tubes; 2 external forward-facing torpedo tubes; 2 external amidships rear-facing torpedo tubes; 1 external rear-facing torpedo tubes; 6 reload torpedoes; QF 4 inch (100 mm) deck gun; 3 anti aircraft machine guns

HNLMS Tijgerhaai (P336) was a Zwaardvisch-class submarine of the Royal Netherlands Navy during and after World War II. She was originally ordered as HMS Tarn (P336), a British T-class submarine, built by Vickers-Armstrongs, Barrow, but never saw service under that name. She would have been the only ship of the Royal Navy to bear the name Tarn.

== Career ==
Video of HNLMS Tijgerhaai with passenger Professor Vening Meinesz from 1959. Dutch newsreel.

The submarine was laid down on 12 June 1943, and launched on 29 November 1944. She was not commissioned into the Royal Navy, instead being transferred to the Royal Netherlands Navy and commissioned into service on 28 March 1945. She was renamed Tijgerhaai.

Tijgerhaai was commissioned as the war was drawing to a close and spent much of 1945 undergoing trials. She had a relatively quiet career, of note being the fact that she was tied up inboard of HMS Sidon when Sidon suffered a torpedo malfunction and sank. On 19 October 1955, she ran aground in Weymouth Bay, and had to be pulled off by tugs. She was decommissioned on 11 December 1964 and was sold to be broken up for scrap on 5 November 1965.
