= Kasashima-class salvage tugboat =

Class overview
- Name: 600-ton salvage tugboat
- Builders: Harima Zōsen Corporation
- Operators: Imperial Japanese Navy
- Preceded by: Tategami class
- Succeeded by: Miura class
- Built: 1937–1939
- In commission: 1938–1947 (?)
- Planned: 2
- Completed: 2
- Lost: 1
- Retired: 1

General characteristics Kasashima class
- Type: Salvage tugboat
- Displacement: 600 long tons (610 t)
- Length: 40.0 m (131 ft 3 in)
- Beam: 8.8 m (28 ft 10 in)
- Draft: 4.3 m (14 ft 1 in)
- Propulsion: 2 × reciprocating engines, 2 × Kampon water tube boilers, 2 shafts, Kasashima; 2,033 ihp; Futakami; 2,249 ihp
- Speed: Kasashima; 14.14 knots (16.27 mph; 26.19 km/h); Futakami; 14.54 knots (16.73 mph; 26.93 km/h)
- Endurance: Fuel: Oil and coal (?)

The Kasashima-class salvage tugboats (笠島型救難船兼曳船,, Kasashima-gata Kyūnansen-ken-eisen) were a class of rescue ship / tugboat of the Imperial Japanese Navy (IJN), serving during World War II. The IJN official designation for this class was 600-ton salvage tugboat (六〇〇瓲救難船兼曳船,, 600-ton Kyūnansen-ken-eisen) for all vessels.

== Background ==
Under the Russo-Japanese War, the IJN purchased many steamships and converted them to salvage vessels. However, when they entered in 1930s, deterioration became remarkable. The IJN initially planned for the Tategami class to succeed them. The IJN was going to build the Tategami class one by one for three years from fiscal year 1936. However, the plan came to an impasse due to budget shortages by the second year. The IJN postponed building of the second ship for two years, and built two cheap 600-ton ships instead: the Hashima (later renamed Kasashima) and Futakami.

== Ships in class ==
Ship	Builder	Laid down	Launched	Completed	Fate
Kasashima (笠島) ex-Hashima (波島)	Harima Zōsen	15 December 1937	8 March 1938	27 May 1938 as Hashima	Renamed Kasashima on 25 October 1940; sunk by aircraft off Taipei 26°22′N 120°56′E on 25 January 1944.
Futakami (二神)	Harima Zōsen	21 October 1938	27 March 1939	30 April 1939	Survived war in Truk; decommissioned on 3 May 1947 (?); later scuttled off Tonowas.

== Bibliography ==
- The Maru Special, Japanese Naval Vessels No. 47, "Japanese naval mine warfare crafts", "Ushio Shobō". (Japan), January 1981.
- Editorial Committee of the Navy, Navy Vol. 11, "Part of small vessels, auxiliary vessels, miscellaneous service ship and converted merchant ships", Seibunsha K.K. (Japan), August 1981.
- 50 year History of Harima Zōsen, Harima Zōsen Corporation, November 1960.
- Shinshichirō Komamiya, The Wartime Convoy Histories, "Shuppan Kyōdōsha". Archived from the original on 2011-07-22. (Japan), October 1987.
- "Japan Center for Asian Historical Records (JACAR)"., National Archives of Japan
  - Reference code: C05110820900, [Data in English is under preparation] 第4890号 12．9．22 600屯救難船兼曳船缶用管間邪魔板製造の件.
  - Reference code: C05110821000, [Data in English is under preparation] 第4891号 12．9．22 600屯救難船兼曳船缶用重油噴燃器及コ-ン製造の件.
- Monthly Ships of the World No. 500, Ships of the Imperial Japanese Navy", "Kaijinsha"., (Japan), August 1995.
