= Tategami-class tugboat =

Class overview
- Name: 800-ton salvage tugboat
- Builders: Maizuru Naval Arsenal; Harima Zōsen Corporation; Mitsubishi Heavy Industries
- Operators: Imperial Japanese Navy; Japan Maritime Safety Agency; Royal Thai Navy; Nippon Salvage Company; Tōyō Salvage K.K.; Kawanami Kōgyō Corporation; Kambara Kisen Company
- Preceded by: Yodohashi as Tategami class; Kasashima class as Miura class
- Succeeded by: Kasashima class as Tategami class
- Subclasses: Tategami class; Miura class
- Cost: 700,000 JPY as Tategami
- Built: 1936–1940 as Tategami class; 1944–1947 as Miura class
- In commission: 1937–1968 (Japan); 1958–1979 (Thailand)
- Planned: 6
- Completed: 5 (+ 1, postwar)
- Lost: 2 (+ 1, postwar)
- Retired: 3

General characteristics Tategami class
- Type: Salvage tugboat
- Displacement: Tategami; 812 long tons (825 t); Nagaura; 800 long tons (813 t)
- Length: 53.5 m (175 ft 6 in) o/a; 50.5 m (165 ft 8 in) wl; 49.0 m (160 ft 9 in) lpp
- Beam: 9.5 m (31 ft 2 in)
- Draught: 3.3 m (10 ft 10 in); Tategami; 4.8 m (15 ft 9 in); Nagaura; 4.812 m (15 ft 9.4 in)
- Propulsion: 2 × reciprocating engines, 2 × mix-fired water tube boilers, 2 shafts, Tategami; 2,278 ihp; Nagaura; 2,375 shp
- Speed: Tategami; 15.37 knots (17.69 mph; 28.47 km/h); Nagaura; 15.25 knots (17.55 mph; 28.24 km/h)
- Range: approx. 1,000 nmi (1,900 km) at 10 kn (12 mph; 19 km/h)
- Endurance: Fuel: 100 tons coal and 70 tons oil
- Complement: 64; 9 officers and warrant officers; 55 ratings (sailors, engineers and divers)
- Armament: latter part of the Pacific War; 2 × Type 96 25 mm AA guns; 6 × depth charges

General characteristics Miura-class
- Type: Salvage tugboat
- Displacement: 883 long tons (897 t)
- Length: 53.5 m (175 ft 6 in) o/a; 49.0 m (160 ft 9 in) lpp
- Beam: 9.5 m (31 ft 2 in)
- Draught: 3.4 m (11 ft 2 in); or 5.03 m (16 ft 6 in)
- Propulsion: 2 × reciprocating engines, 2 shafts, 2,200 shp
- Speed: 11.0 knots (12.7 mph; 20.4 km/h)
- Armament: 2 × Type 96 25 mm AA guns; 6 × depth charges

The Tategami-class salvage tugboats (立神型救難船兼曳船,, Tategami-gata Kyūnansen-ken-eisen) were a class of rescue ship/tugboat of the Imperial Japanese Navy (IJN), serving during World War II. The Miura-class (三浦型) was a wartime variant which introduced measures to simplify production. The official IJN designation for all vessels was 800-ton salvage tugboat (八〇〇瓲救難船兼曳船,, 800-ton Kyūnansen-ken-eisen).

== Background ==
After the Russo-Japanese War, the IJN purchased many steamships and converted them to salvage vessels. However, by the beginning of the 1930s, replacements were needed, to this end the IJN introduced the Tategami-class.

== Ships in classes ==
=== Tategami class ===
The IJN was going to build the Tategami class one by one for three years from fiscal year 1936, at first. However, the plan came to a deadlock for budget shortage by the second year. The IJN postponed building of second ship Oshima for two years.

Ship	Builder	Laid down	Launched	Completed	Fate
Tategami (立神) ex-Salvage tugboat No. 941	Harima Zōsen	27 May 1936 as Salvage tugboat No. 941	29 August 1936	25 January 1937 as Tategami	Renamed Tategami on 22 January 1937. Survived war; decommissioned on 30 November 1945. Sold to Nippon Salvage Company and renamed Tategami Maru (立神丸) in 1945. Retired in 1968.
one vessel					Converted to Kasashima class, because naval budget was short.
Oshima (雄島)	Maizuru Naval Arsenal			fiscal year 1939	Sunk in an accident in Truk (Tonowas) on 10 October 1943.
Nagaura (長浦)	Harima Zōsen	11 January 1940	16 May 1940	21 October 1940	Sunk by USN Destroyer Squadron 23 off Kavieng 00°54′S 148°38′E with minelayer Natsushima on 22 February 1944.

=== Miura class ===
To simplify and speed-up construction of the Tategami class, the Kampon introduced wartime standard ship structures into the Tategami design.

Ship	Builder	Laid down	Launched	Completed	Fate
Miura (三浦)	Mitsubishi Heavy Industries, Shimonoseki shipyard	5 May 1944	7 September 1944	25 December 1944	Survived war; decommissioned on 30 November 1945; renamed Miura Maru (三浦丸) in postwar. Transferred to Japan Maritime Safety Agency on 4 August 1949; renamed Miura (みうら PL-01, later PL-101) on 15 December; retired on 3 June 1967.
Yumihari (弓張)	Mitsubishi Heavy Industries, Shimonoseki shipyard	15 July 1944	16 December 1944	12 March 1945	Survived war; decommissioned on 30 November 1945. Transferred to Tōyō Salvage K.K. and renamed Yumihari Maru (弓張丸) in 1945, sold to Kawanami Kōgyō Corporation in 1947. Sold to Thailand and renamed Rangkwien in 1958. Decommissioned on 30 April 1979.
Hanashima (花島)	Mitsubishi Heavy Industries, Shimonoseki shipyard	23 October 1944 as Hanashima	5 December 1945 as Akama Maru	28 February 1947	Incomplete until the end of war; transferred to Mitsubishi Heavy Industries and renamed Akama Maru (赤間丸) in 1945. Sold to Kambara Kisen Company and renamed Tensya Maru No. 3 (第三天社丸, Daisan Tensya Maru) in 1954, aground and broken in February 1962 at Kitan Strait.

== Bibliography ==
- The Maru Special, Japanese Naval Vessels No. 53, Japanese support vessels, "Ushio Shobō". (Japan), July 1981
- Editorial Committee of the Navy, Navy Vol. 11, "Part of small vessels, auxiliary vessels, miscellaneous service ships and converted merchant ships", Seibunsha K.K. (Japan), August 1981
- 30 year History of Japan Maritime Safety Agency, Policy and Legal Affairs Division-Japan Maritime Safety Agency (JMSA), May 1979
- 50 year History of Harima Zōsen, Harima Zōsen Corporation, November 1960
- 75 year History of Mitsubishi Heavy Industries-Shimonoseki shipyard, Mitsubishi Heavy Industries-Shimonoseki shipyard, 1964
- Monthly Ships of the World No. 613, Special issue Vol. 62 "All ships of Japan Coast Guard 1948–2003", "Kaijinsha"., (Japan), July 2003
- Jirō Kimata, Introductory book of the Japanese small vessels, Kōjinsha (Japan), December 1999
- Shizuo Fukui
  - Japanese Naval Vessels Survived "Their post-war activities and final disposition", Shuppan Kyodosha (Japan), May 1961
  - FUKUI SHIZUO COLLECTION "Japanese Naval Vessels 1869–1945", KK Bestsellers (Japan), December 1994
- "Japan Center for Asian Historical Records (JACAR)"., National Archives of Japan
  - Reference code: C05034279700, No. 35, 1935 March 13 Staff for construction of the tug boat and salvage boat
  - Reference code: C05034885500, May 1936 Instructions for Production of Electric Equipment for 800-ton Type Steel Salvage Tug Boat (1)
  - Reference code: C05034885600, May 1936 Instructions for Production of Electric Equipment for 800-ton Type Steel Salvage Tug Boat (2)
  - Reference code: C05034940200, Fleet Activity Command No. 6084 May 21, 1936 Newly Constructed Factotum Vessels by Fiscal Year 1936 Provisional Factotum Vessels Production Fee
  - Reference code: C05110830400, [Data in English is under preparation] 官房306号 12．1．22 雑役船の公称番号及船種変更の件
  - Reference code: C08030664200, Detailed engagement report and wartime log book from October 1, 1943 to February 5, 1944, Special Service Vessel Hakkai-Maru (1)
