= USS Hawkbill (SS-366) =

Submarine of the United States

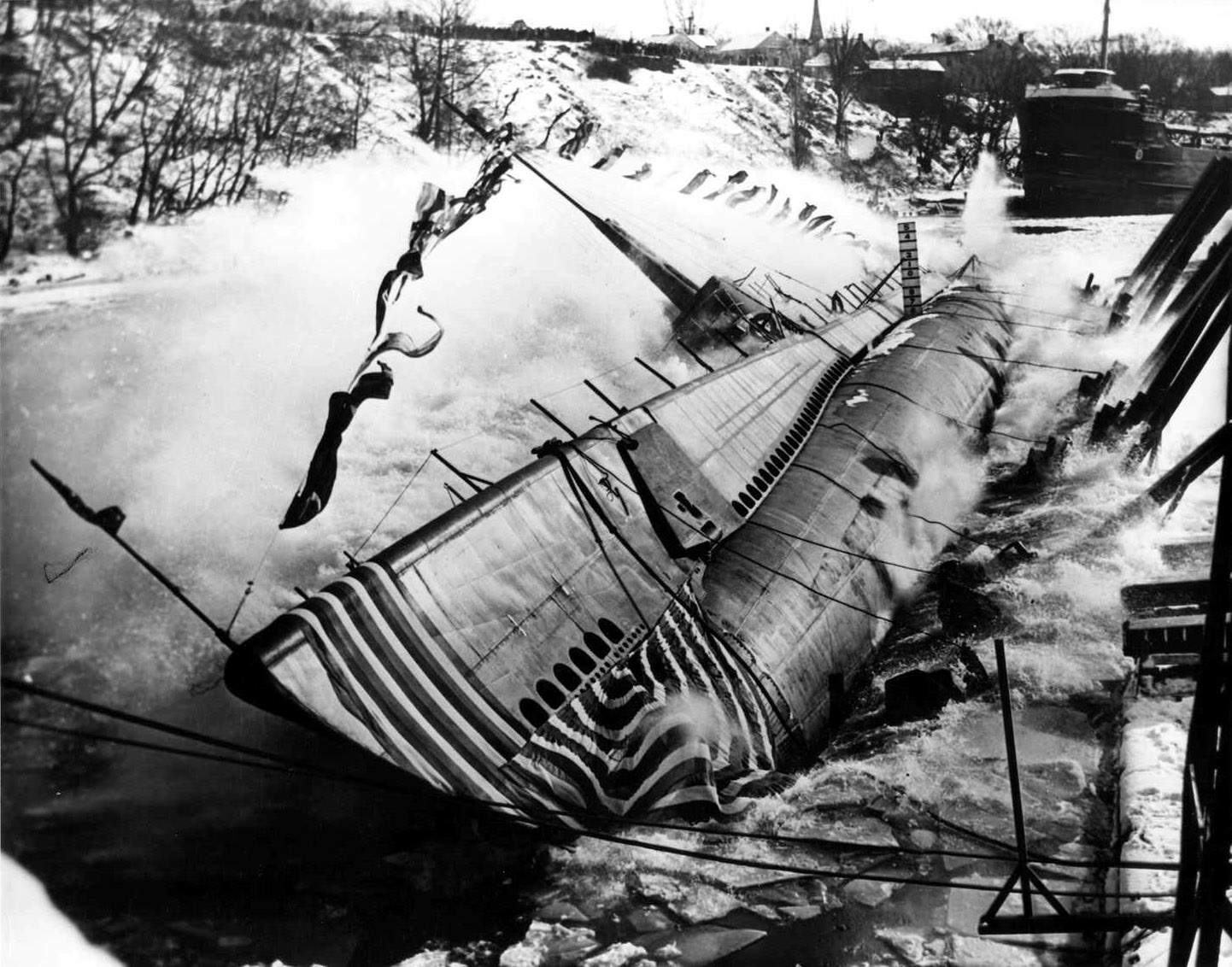
- Hawkbill (SS-366), launches sideways into the Manitowoc River, 9 January 1944.

History

United States
- Name: USS Hawkbill (SS-366)
- Builder: Manitowoc Shipbuilding Co., Manitowoc, Wisconsin
- Laid down: 7 August 1943
- Launched: 9 January 1944
- Commissioned: 17 May 1944
- Decommissioned: 20 September 1946
- Recommissioned: 1953
- Decommissioned: 21 April 1953
- Fate: Transferred to the Netherlands, 21 April 1953, sold to the Netherlands, 20 February 1970
- Stricken: 20 February 1970

Netherlands
- Name: HNLMS Zeeleeuw (S803)
- Acquired: 21 April 1953
- Fate: Sold for scrap, 24 November 1970

General characteristics
- Class & type: Balao class diesel-electric submarine
- Displacement: 1,526 tons (1,550 t) surfaced; 2,424 tons (2,463 t) submerged
- Length: 311 ft 9 in (95.02 m)
- Beam: 27 ft 3 in (8.31 m)
- Draft: 16 ft 10 in (5.13 m) maximum
- Propulsion: 4 × Fairbanks-Morse Model 38D8-⅛ 10-cylinder opposed piston diesel engines driving electrical generators; 2 × 126-cell Sargo batteries; 4 × high-speed Elliott electric motors with reduction gears; two propellers; 5,400 shp (4.0 MW) surfaced; 2,740 shp (2.0 MW) submerged
- Speed: 20.25 knots (38 km/h) surfaced; 8.75 knots (16 km/h) submerged
- Range: 11,000 nautical miles (20,000 km) surfaced at 10 knots (19 km/h)
- Endurance: 48 hours at 2 knots (3.7 km/h) submerged; 75 days on patrol
- Test depth: 400 ft (120 m)
- Complement: 10 officers, 70–71 enlisted
- Armament: 10 × 21-inch (533 mm) torpedo tubes; 6 forward, 4 aft; 24 torpedoes; 1 × 5-inch (127 mm) / 25 caliber deck gun; Bofors 40 mm and Oerlikon 20 mm cannon

USS Hawkbill (SS-366), a Balao-class submarine, was the first ship of the United States Navy to be named for the hawksbill, a large sea turtle (the "-s-" was inadvertently dropped at commissioning.).

== Construction and commissioning ==
Hawkbill (SS-366) was launched by the Manitowoc Shipbuilding Company in Manitowoc, Wisconsin, on 9 January 1944, sponsored by Mrs. F. W. Scanland, Jr., and commissioned on 17 May 1944.

== Operational history ==
Following a period of training on the Great Lakes, Hawkbill departed 1 June 1944 from Manitowoc to begin the long journey down the Illinois River and finally by barge down the Mississippi. She arrived at New Orleans on 10 June, and after combat loading, sailed on 16 June for training at the submarine base at Balboa, Panama Canal Zone. On 18 June 1944, the 5,433-gross register ton Panamanian merchant ship SS White Clover mistook her for a German U-boat and opened gunfire on her in the Caribbean Sea about 20 nautical miles (37 km; 23 mi) south of Cape San Antonio, Cuba, at 21°31′N 085°04′W, firing six rounds. Hawkbill signaled White Clover to cease firing and suffered no casualties or damage.

After completing her training from Balboa, Hawkbill arrived at Pearl Harbor, Hawaii, on 28 July 1944 for final preparations before her first war patrol.

=== First and second war patrols ===
Departing 23 August, the submarine steamed via Saipan to her patrol area in the Philippine Islands in company with Baya and Becuna. In October, Hawkbill shifted patrol to the South China Sea, and while approaching two carriers on 7 October, was forced down by violent depth charging by Japanese destroyers. Two days later she attacked a 12-ship convoy with Becuna, damaging several of the ships. Hawkbill transited heavily patrolled Lombok Strait 14 October, and terminated her first patrol at Fremantle, Western Australia, on 17 October.

In company with Becuna and Flasher (SS-249), the submarine departed for her second patrol on 15 November bound for the area north of the Malay Barrier. She encountered a convoy on 15 December and sank the destroyer Momo with six well-placed torpedoes during a night attack. Finding few contacts—a testament to the effectiveness of the American submarines—Hawkbill headed once more for Lombok Strait. This time, she was sighted by a patrol craft, but cleverly maneuvered into a rain squall. The submarine was then fired upon by shore batteries before passing out of range. Hawkbill returned to Fremantle on 5 January 1945.

=== Third and fourth war patrols ===
On her third war patrol beginning 5 February, the submarine returned to Lombok Strait to turn the tables on her former pursuers. Her torpedoes sank two submarine chasers 14 February, and she added some small craft before turning for the South China Sea. Hawkbill detected a convoy on 20 February; after engaging one escort with gunfire, she sank 5,400-ton cargo ship Daizen Maru with a spread of torpedoes. The rest of her patrol brought no targets; she arrived at Fremantle 6 April 1945.

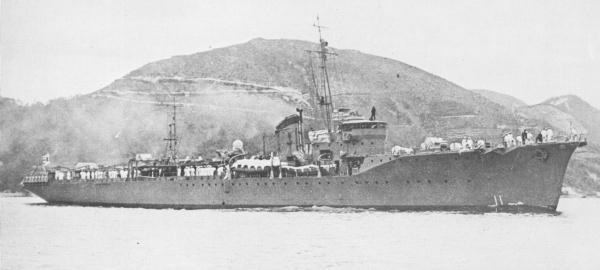
IJN Hatsutaka 1939

Departing on her fourth patrol on 5 May, Hawkbill served on lifeguard station for a B-24 strike on the Kangean Islands north of Bali. She arrived on 16 May on her patrol station off the coast of Malaya and soon afterward encountered the minelayer Hatsutaka heading south along the coast. She attacked and had two hits, causing severe damage. The ship was observed next morning being towed to the beach. At a range of almost 5,000 yards (4,600 m), Hawkbill fired three more torpedoes into the shallow waters and broke the ship in half, sinking a familiar enemy of submarines operating on the Malayan coast. After further patrol off Malaya and in the Gulf of Siam, she arrived at Subic Bay on 18 June 1945.

=== Fifth war patrol and Japanese surrender ===
Hawkbill departed for her fifth and last war patrol 12 July. Returning to the coast of Malaya, she attacked a convoy on 18 July. Her first torpedoes missed, and an hour later, a depth charge attack of unusual accuracy and intensity began from the destroyer Kamikaze. Hawkbill was blown partially out of the water by a perfectly placed pattern and damaged considerably, but by hugging the bottom with all machinery secured, she eluded the attacking destroyer. After a stay at Subic Bay for repairs, she steamed to Borneo to meet with Australian Army officers for a special mission. Hawkbill destroyed two radio stations with her deck guns, landed commandos at Terampha Town, and destroyed shore installations. After reconnaissance of the Anambas Islands, also in the South China Sea, the versatile submarine returned to Borneo on 13 August.

Following the surrender of Japan, Hawkbill sailed to Pearl Harbor, departing on 22 September 1945 for San Francisco. She was decommissioned at Mare Island on 30 September 1946 and joined the Reserve Fleet. Brought out of reserve in 1952, Hawkbill was given a GUPPY IB conversion and lent to the Netherlands under the Military Assistance Program on 21 April 1953.

=== HNLMS Zeeleeuw (S803) ===
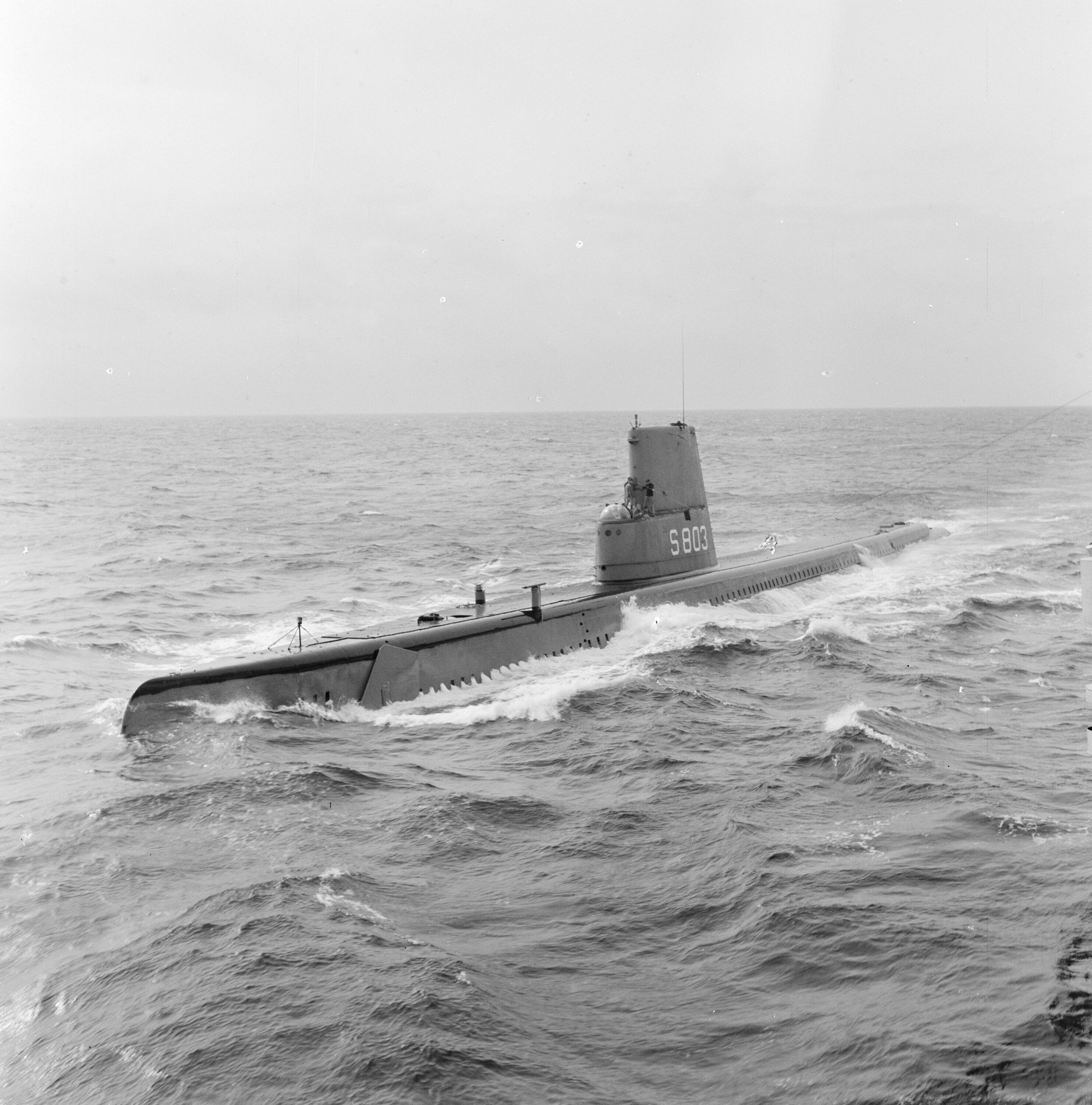
Hr.Ms. Zeeleeuw (S803) underway in 1959.

The submarine was commissioned in the Royal Netherlands Navy as HNLMS Zeeleeuw (S803), the first Dutch naval ship to be named for the sea lion. Zeeleeuw reached Rotterdam 11 June, in time to participate successfully in NATO summer exercises, "beating" the Royal Navy and the U.S. Navy. On 24 November 1970, Zeeleeuw was sold for scrap.

== Honors and awards ==
Hawkbill received six battle stars for World War II service. All five of her war patrols were designated successful, and she received a Navy Unit Commendation for her outstanding performance on patrols one, three, and four.
