= HMS Strongbow (P235) =

Submarine of the Royal Navy

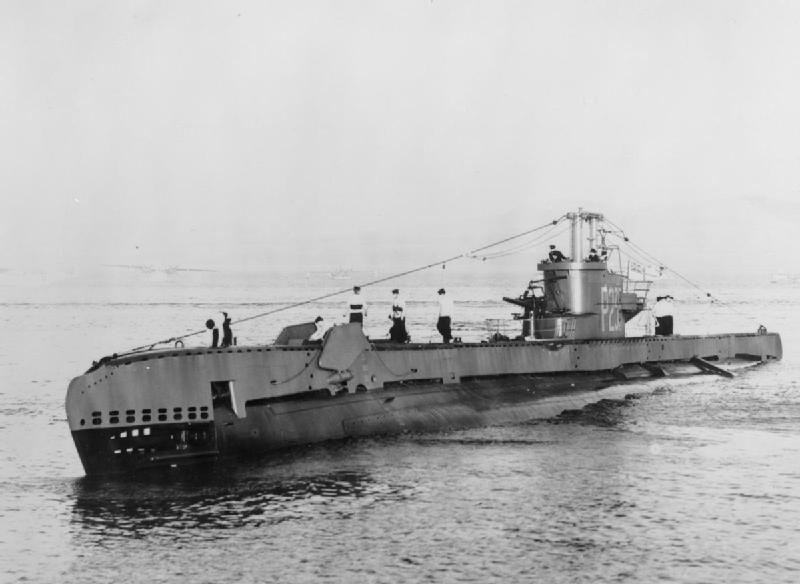
- HMS Strongbow

History

United Kingdom
- Name: HMS Strongbow
- Builder: Scotts, Greenock
- Laid down: 17 April 1942
- Launched: 30 August 1943
- Commissioned: 23 December 1943
- Fate: Broken up April 1946

General characteristics
- Displacement: 814-872 tons surfaced; 990 tons submerged
- Length: 217 ft (66 m)
- Beam: 23 ft 6 in (7.16 m)
- Draught: 11 ft (3.4 m)
- Speed: 14.75 knots surfaced; 8 knots submerged
- Complement: 48 officers and men
- Armament: 6 × forward 21 inch (533 mm) torpedo tubes, one aft; 13 torpedoes; one three-inch (76 mm) gun (QF 4-inch on later boats); one 20 mm cannon; three .303-calibre machine gun

HMS Strongbow was an S-class submarine of the Royal Navy, and part of the Third Group built of that class. She was built by Scotts, of Greenock and launched on 30 August 1943.

She served in the Second World War, spending most of it in the Pacific Far East, where she sank the small Japanese army cargo ship Toso Maru No.1, the Japanese merchant cargo ship Manryo Maru, four Japanese sailing vessels, a Japanese tug and a Japanese barge, three small unidentified Japanese vessels, three Siamese sailing vessels and six other small Siamese / Japanese vessels.

Strongbow was detected on the surface off Port Swettenham, Malaya on 13 January 1945. Japanese escorts, minelayer Hatsutaka, sub chaser CH-9, auxiliary sub-chaser CHa-41 and one other, soon arrived to attack her. Strongbow managed to escape but sustained such depth charge damage during a 14-hour attack that she was rendered unfit for further service. She was decommissioned at Falmouth in June 1945, and scrapped at Preston in April 1946.
