= Japanese minelayer Itsukushima =

Naval warship (1929–1944)

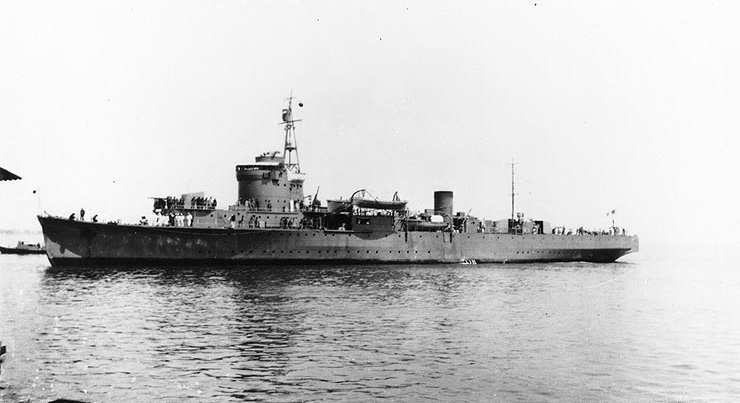
- Itsukushima, circa 1935

History

Japan
- Name: Itsukushima
- Ordered: Fiscal 1923
- Builder: Uraga Dock Company
- Laid down: 2 February 1928
- Launched: 22 May 1929
- Commissioned: 26 December 1929
- Stricken: 10 January 1945
- Fate: Torpedoed and sunk, 7 October 1944

General characteristics
- Type: Minelayer
- Displacement: 1,970 long tons (2,002 t) (standard)
- Length: 104 m (341 ft 2 in) (waterline)
- Beam: 11.83 m (38 ft 10 in)
- Draught: 3.22 m (10 ft 7 in)
- Installed power: 3 boilers; 39,000 bhp (29,000 kW)
- Propulsion: 3 shafts; 3 diesel engines
- Speed: 17 knots (31 km/h; 20 mph)
- Range: 5,000 nmi (9,300 km; 5,800 mi) at 10 knots (19 km/h; 12 mph)
- Complement: 221
- Armament: 3 × 14 cm (5.5 in) guns; 2 × 8 cm (3 in) guns; 500 × Type 5 naval mines

Itsukushima (厳島) was a medium-sized minelayer of the Imperial Japanese Navy, which was in service during the Second Sino-Japanese War and World War II. She was named after Itsukushima, a sacred island in Hiroshima Prefecture of Japan. She was the first warship in the Imperial Japanese Navy with all-diesel engine propulsion.

== Building ==
Under the fiscal 1923 budget, the Imperial Japanese Navy authorized a minelayer to supplement its aging minelayers, the former cruisers Aso, and Tokiwa. The new vessel was designed to carry 500 Type 5 naval mines, and to incorporate design features developed through operational experience gained in World War I. Initial plans to procure a 3,000-ton vessel were scaled back to 2,000 tons due to budget limitations.

Itsukushima was launched by the Uraga Dock Company on 22 May 1929, and was commissioned into service on 26 December 1929.

== Operational history ==
After commissioning, Itsukushima was assigned to the Yokosuka Naval District as a reserve and training vessel, making occasional cruises to the South Seas Mandate and Bonin Islands. She was commanded by Captain (Prince) Teruhisa Komatsu from December 1930 to November 1931. During the Combined Fleet Maneuvers of 1935, she was attached to the IJN 4th Fleet and suffered damage due to a typhoon in what was termed the "Fourth Fleet Incident". The damage required several months of extensive repairs, resulting in an almost complete rebuild by May 1936. She was commanded by Captain (Prince) Prince Fushimi Hiroyoshi from November 1935 to December 1936. Itsukushima was assigned to the IJN 3rd Fleet from 20 October 1936, but is reassigned directly to the Combined Fleet after the Marco Polo Bridge Incident and the start of the Second Sino-Japanese War. After patrols off the Chinese coast until October 1937, Itsukushima was reassigned back to the IJN 3rd Fleet and stationed at Ryojun Guard District. From December 1937 to 20 March 1938, Itsukushima was assigned to the IJN 4th Fleet, and then back to Yokosuka Naval District, but based at Sasebo. From August 1938, under the command of the IJN 3rd Fleet, Itsukushima began patrols of the Yangzi River in China. However, at the end of 1938, she was removed from active duty and placed on reserve status and returned to Yokosuka.

Istukushima was reactivated on 15 November 1940 under the Combined Fleet and resumed patrols of the China coast to April 1941, when she was reassigned back to the IJN 3rd Fleet and deployed to Palau in December 1941. At the time of the attack on Pearl Harbor in December 1941, Itsukushima was assigned to the Southern Philippines Striking Force of the IJN 3rd Fleet under the overall command of Admiral Ibō Takahashi, and tasked with mining the San Bernardino Strait.

In January 1942, Itsukushima was assigned to the Netherlands East Indies theatre of operations, supporting the Japanese invasions of Tarakan and Balikpapan in Borneo as flagship of the Second Base Unit under Admiral Sueto Hirose. From 10 March, she was reassigned to the 3rd Southern Expeditionary Fleet under Admiral Rokuzō Sugiyama, and continued to support operations in Borneo and Java. She was then reassigned to the Second Southern Expeditionary Fleet, under the Southwest Area Fleet, patrolling between Singapore, Surabaya, Batavia and Ambon to the end of the year. On 25–26 December 1942, together with the light cruiser Natori, Itsukushima landed troops of the 24th Naval Base force which captured Hollandia, New Guinea.

Itsukushima was subsequently based out of Palau through most of 1943, becoming part of the 4th Southern Expeditionary Fleet from 30 November, and was deployed to Ambon by the end of the year.

In early 1944, Itsukushima was assigned to escort convoys between Ambon, Surabaya and Halmahera Island. On 6 May, she was unsuccessfully attacked by USS Bonefish, in the Celebes Sea. On 31 May, Itsukushima was assigned to "Operation KON" (the Relief of Biak), transporting reinforcements from Zamboanga on Mindanao in an effort to counter the American landings. On 24 August, Itsukushima was attacked by USAAF B-25 Mitchell bombers from the 345th Bomb Group while escorting a convoy near Lahbeh Strait near the Celebes. A near miss flooded her aft section and engine room. She was attacked again on 2 September, but shot down two of the attacking planes, and so damaging two others that they were forced to crash-land. On 4 October, the minelayer Wakataka arrived to take Itsukushima under tow for Surabaya. However, on 17 October, while transiting the Java Sea under tow, Itsukushima was torpedoed by the Royal Dutch Navy submarine HNLMS Zwaardvisch, and sank at position 5°23′S 113°48′E.

Itsukushima was removed from the navy list on 10 January 1945.

=== Shipwreck ===
On 15 December 2002 a group of divers operating off the dive vessel MV Empress located the wreck of Itsukushima northeast of Bawean Island in the Java Sea. At the time of discovery the wreck lay in two sections, cleanly severed where Zwaardvisch's torpedo struck aft. The much larger forward section rests 350 to 400 m (1,150 to 1,310 ft) from the severed stern and is completely upside down from the bow stem to the break where the three propeller shafts begin to exit the hull. No upper works or superstructure whatsoever can be seen. The small severed stern section sits upright and is relatively intact. The deck has deteriorated with the 'doors' on the two outer mine-laying 'wings' closed and in place. The 'doors' across the stern itself are missing. No 5.5-inch guns can be seen on the aft section, but one gun mount sits upright on the seabed about 15 m (49 ft) from the break in the hull.

== See also ==
- Japanese minelayer Shirataka
