= Japanese minelayer Shirataka =

Imperial Japanese naval ship

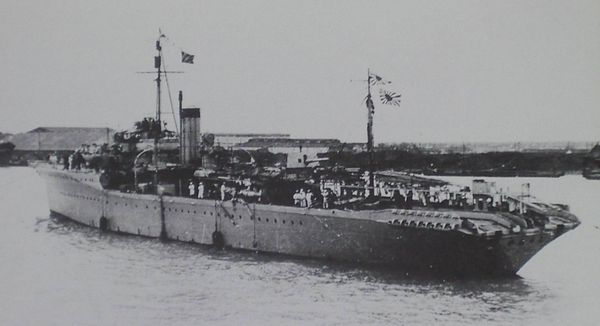
- Shirataka in 1938

History

Empire of Japan
- Name: Shirataka
- Ordered: Fiscal 1923
- Builder: Tōkyō Ishikawajima Shipyard
- Laid down: 24 November 1927
- Launched: 25 January 1929
- Commissioned: 9 April 1929
- Stricken: 10 October 1944
- Fate: Sunk, 31 August 1944

General characteristics
- Type: Minelayer
- Displacement: 1,345 long tons (1,367 t) (standard)
- Length: 84 m (276 ft) (waterline)
- Beam: 11.55 m (37 ft 11 in)
- Draught: 3.1 m (10 ft 2 in)
- Installed power: 2 steam boilers, 2,200 hp (1,600 kW)
- Propulsion: 2-shaft reciprocating steam engine
- Speed: 16 knots (30 km/h; 18 mph)
- Range: 2,000 nmi (3,700 km; 2,300 mi) at 10 knots (19 km/h; 12 mph)
- Complement: 148
- Armament: 3 × 120 mm (4.7 in) guns; 1 × 13 mm (0.51 in) AA gun; 24 × Type 14 500 m (1,600 ft) anti-submarine nets or 100 × Mk.5 naval mines; 2 × depth charge throwers, 18 × depth charges

Shirataka (白鷹, "White Hawk") was a medium-sized minelayer of the Imperial Japanese Navy, which was in service during the Second Sino-Japanese War and World War II. She was the world's first purpose-built anti-submarine netlayer. Also, unlike any other warship in the Japanese Navy, she had two chrysanthemum crests due to her unusual bow configuration.

== Background ==
Under the fiscal 1923 budget, the Imperial Japanese Navy authorized a new type of minelayer (Project H2) to supplement its aging minelayers, the former cruisers Aso and Tokiwa. The new vessel was designed to carry either 100 Type 5 naval mines, or to function as a netlayer based on design features developed through operational experience to counter German submarines gained in World War I. At first the project plans called for Shirataka to be a 5,000-ton dedicated netlayer, and to be paired with a 3,000-ton-class minelayer (project number H1, later called Itsukushima). However, due to budgetary limitations and in response to the Washington Naval Treaty of 1922, the designs of both vessels were scaled down, and Shirataka was called on to serve as a dual-purpose netlayer/minelayer.

Shirataka was launched by the Tōkyō Ishikawajima Shipyard on 25 January 1929, and was commissioned into service on 9 April 1929.

== Operational history ==
After commissioning, Shirataka was assigned to the Kure Naval District. In the second half of 1934, after the Tomozuru incident, she was reconstructed at Kure Naval Arsenal with additional ballast and a lowered bridge and funnel, resulting in an almost complete rebuild by May 1936. Shirataka was assigned to patrols of the China coast after the Marco Polo Bridge Incident and the start of the Second Sino-Japanese War in August 1937. From 1 December 1937 she was assigned to the No.1 Base Force, IJN 3rd Fleet (Shanghai).

In November 1940, Shirataka was reconstructed into an escort patrol vessel by addition of 36 depth charges and was reassigned to the IJN 3rd Fleet on 1 December 1941 under the overall command of Admiral Ibō Takahashi.

At the time of the Attack on Pearl Harbor in December 1941, Shirataka was stationed at Takao on Taiwan, and was assigned to "Operation M", (the invasion of the northern Philippines). In January 1942, Shirataka was assigned to the Netherlands East Indies theatre of operations, supporting the Japanese invasions of Tarakan and Balikpapan in Borneo and participating in the Battle of Sunda Strait on 27 February. From 10 March, she was reassigned to Admiral Nobutake Kondō's No.21 Special Base Force, Southern Expeditionary Fleet and was based at Surabaya. On 1 August, she joined Admiral Gunichi Mikawa's IJN 8th Fleet and in November, escorted convoys to Shortland Island and Bougainville. At the end of the year, she was based at Wewak. On 20 February 1943, Shirataka escaped from an attack by USS Albacore without damage while on an escort mission in the Bismarck Archipelago. Shirataka continued with convoy escort duty between Palau and New Guinea and the Solomon Islands through February 1944, joining the IJN 9th Fleet from 15 November 1943.

From 22 March 1944, Shirataka underwent refit and overhaul at Kure Naval Arsenal, where radar/sonar/anti-aircraft arms were installed. On 5 April 1944, she was assigned to the Escort Fleet under Admiral Koshiro Oikawa. From 21 April to 20 May 1944, she was flagship for the escort operation for the Take Ichi convoy from Shanghai to Manila to Halmahera Island and back, with heavy losses to the convoy ships, but no damage to Shirataka. After escorting a convoy from Manila back to Moji in June, she subsequently escorted Convoy Hi-67 to Manila and Singapore from 20 June to 9 July 1944. She returned with Convoy Hi-68 on 20 July, and escorted Convoy Mo-05 to Okinawa on 5 August.

On 19 August, Shirataka escorted Convoy Mi-15 from Moji to Miri in Sarawak. On 31 August, while transiting Luzon Strait, the convoy was attacked by USS Queenfish, USS Sealion and USS Growler, which sank several of the transports. As she entered Bashi Channel at 07:30, Shirataka was hit by two of three torpedoes fired by Sealion. She sank at 21°05′N 121°26′E at 11:15 with loss of all hands, including her CO, Captain Takahide Miki, who was subsequently posthumously promoted to rear admiral.

Shirataka was removed from the navy list on 10 October 1944.
