= Operation Substance =

Naval operation of WWII

- Part of the Battle of the Mediterranean of the Second World War
- Relief map of the Mediterranean Sea
| Date | 13–28 July 1941 |
| Location | Mediterranean Sea |
| Result | British victory |

Belligerents
| United Kingdom; Australia | Italy |

Commanders and leaders
| James Somerville | |

Strength
| 1 aircraft carrier; 1 battleship; 1 battlecruiser; 4 light cruisers; 18 destroyers; 13 merchant ships | 3 torpedo boats; 1 submarine; 4 MAS boats; 9 torpedo bombers; 4 medium bombers |

Casualties and losses
| 35 killed; 1 destroyer sunk; 1 light cruiser damaged; 1 destroyer damaged; 2 merchant ships damaged; 6 FAA Fulmars shot down; 6 lost to other causes; 1 Beaufighter | 7 Savoia-Marchetti S.79; 1 CANT Z.506B; 1 Macchi MC.200 |

Operation Substance was a British naval operation in July 1941 during the Second World War to escort Convoy GM 1 from Gibraltar to Malta and Convoy MG 1 from Malta. Italian submarines, aircraft and MAS boats (Motoscafo armato silurante, motor torpedo boats) attacked the ships.

In the spring of 1941, the strategic situation in the Mediterranean had deteriorated. The Axis armies in Libya forced back the British to the Egyptian frontier; German armies had overrun Jugoslavia and then captured Greece and Crete, causing severe losses to the Mediterranean Fleet. Force H, in the western Mediterranean, was still intact and supply convoys to Malta would have to come from the west.

Convoy GM 1 of six merchant ships and a troop transport was to be escorted to Malta and Convoy MG 1 of seven unloaded freighters escorted from Malta to Gibraltar. Force H was to take the Malta convoy as far as the Sicily–Tunisia narrows, reinforced by Force X that had escorted the ships from Britain to Gibraltar. the Force x cruisers and destroyers would take the convoy through to Malta, as the reciprocal Convoy MG 1 sailed, Force H cruising near Sardinia in wait for both.

The destroyer HMS Fearless was hit by a torpedo bomber and scuttled, the cruiser HMS Manchester was torpedoed, damaged and towed back to Gibraltar, HMS Firedrake was near-missed and damaged by bombers. The merchant ship Sydney Star in Convoy GM 1 was torpedoed by a MAS boat and Hoegh Hood in Convoy MG 1 was hit and damaged by a torpedo bomber; twelve Fulmar fighters of HMS Ark Royal were shot down and nine Italian aircraft were claimed and several damaged.

== Background ==
=== British plan ===
Map of Malta

Supply runs to Malta by submarine were known as Magic Carpet runs, that in July 1941 carried 84,280 imp gal (383,100 L; 101,220 US gal) of petrol, 83,000 imp gal (380,000 L; 100,000 US gal) of paraffin, 6 long tons (6.1 t) of aircraft ammunition, torpedoes and other munitions, 30 long tons (30 t) of stores, 136 service personnel and 12 long tons (12 t) of post yet submarine transport was far less preferable to bulk freight being delivered by ship.

After the Battle of Crete (20 May – 1 June 1941) Admiral Andrew Cunningham, the Commander-in-Chief, Mediterranean Fleet, signalled Admiral of the Fleet, Sir Dudley Pound, the First Sea Lord, at the Admiralty, on 2 June, that with the Luftwaffe busy in the eastern Mediterranean it would be wise to send a convoy to Malta from the west. Fliegerkorps X had been transferred from Sicily to Poland for Operation Barbarossa, the invasion of the Soviet Union.

The unladen ships at Malta from earlier supply convoys would depart as Convoy MG 1 to take advantage of Forces H and X. The convoy would sail in three groups determined by ship speed, the HMS Breconshire a civilian ship converted to a fast tanker and Talabot group would sail at 17 kn (31 km/h; 20 mph), a second group, Thermopylæ and Amerika would sail at 14 kn (26 km/h; 16 mph) and the third group, Settler, Svenor and Hoegh Hood would make 12 kn (22 km/h; 14 mph) and be met by Force X from Malta and Force H south-west of Sardinia.

==== Mediterranean Fleet ====
In Operation ME 2, two submarines near Crete would send misleading signals to suggest that HMS Queen Elizabeth and its escorts were heading westwards and in Operation ME 3 the real ships would return to Alexandria under cover of night. The main effort would come from the west but eight submarines would patrol off Italian naval bases, in case the Italian fleet sortied. The British thought that the Italians had five operational battleships, three at Taranto and ten cruisers at Taranto, Messina and Palermo. Sending a convoy from Malta with only one destroyer escort was risky but with the Mediterranean Fleet so depleted, it could not be helped.

==== Royal Air Force ====
The Royal Air Force had more aircraft than in January and could provide anti-submarine sorties from Gibraltar for the first two days of the voyage east from Gibraltar and other aircraft could watch between Sardinia and north Africa and the Italian ports. Fighters on Malta could cover Force X after Ark Royal had turned back with Force H. Intelligence reported that German aircraft had left the western Mediterranean and that the Regia Aeronautica had about fifty torpedo bombers, 120 medium bombers and thirty dive bombers split roughly evenly between Sardinia and Sicily.

=== Axis ===
==== Axis air forces ====
Italuft, a Luftwaffe liaison headquarters had been established in Rome in June 1940 and Fliegerkorps X (General Hans Geisler) with about 120 bombers, 150 Junkers Ju 87 dive bombers, 40 Messerschmitt Bf 110 heavy fighters and twenty reconnaissance aircraft was in Sicily by mid-January 1941. Fliegerkorps X was to subdue Malta, to attack British ships, cut the Mediterranean supply route to Egypt and support the Axis army in Libya and it began attacks British ships at Malta on 9 January 1941. On 10 January the Luftwaffe attacked the ships of Operation Excess with 60 Junkers Ju 87 dive bombers and Heinkel He 111 medium bombers and inflicted severe damage on the aircraft carrier HMS Illustrious. on the following day two cruisers were damaged, one being scuttled. On 16 January attacks began on Illustrious in Grand Harbour at Malta, causing severe damage to the docks, houses, then the bombers turned to the airfields, bombing that continued until March. In May Fliegerkorps X was transferred to prepare for the invasions of Jugoslavia and Greece.

== Prelude ==
=== Convoy WS 9c ===
Map of the Bay of Biscay

On 27 June, in great secrecy, the reefer ship, SS Port Chalmers (8,535 gross register tons [GRT]) unloading New Zealand meat at Avonmouth, was requisitioned by the Ministry of War Transport and sent to Newport, where it took on cement, wheat, maize, corned beef, cigarettes, cloth, firearms, ammunition, vehicles, aircraft parts and 2,000 long tons (2,000 t) of cased petrol. Just before sailing, 250 gunners of the Royal Artillery with one light, one heavy anti-aircraft regiment and thirty field guns were embarked with a naval liaison officer. On deck, six 40 mm Bofors guns were fixed to the superstructure to go with the seven Lewis guns and the 4.7-inch gun on the poop deck already carried.

The ship sailed on 11 July, escorted by the Dutch destroyer leader HNLMS Jacob van Heemskerck and met MV Deucalion (7,740 GRT) en route to the Mersey. On 12 July SS Sydney Star (12, 696 GRT) and City of Pretoria (8,049 GRT) departed the Mersey with destroyer escorts and sailed parallel with Port Chalmers and Deucalion, none of the captains knowing who was the convoy commodore. Captain Thomas Horn of Sydney Star found that he was the commodore and ordered the ships into line abreast. During the morning of 13 July other ships joined from the Clyde, the ex-French SS Pasteur (29,253 GRT) MV Melbourne Star (12, 806 GRT) SS Avila Star (14,443 GRT), MV Durham (10,893) and the ferry MV Leinster (4,303 GRT).

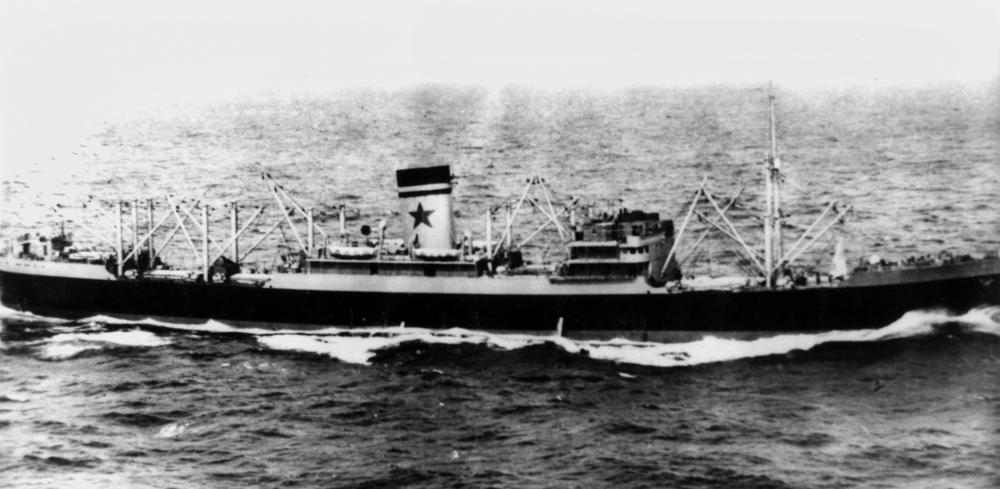
Melbourne Star

The ships turned south for Gibraltar and the captain of Melbourne Star, David MacFarlane, took over as convoy commodore. The ships' masters were not told of the destination until Force X arrived. During the voyage south, Syfret exercised the merchant ships in simultaneous manoeuvring, that was useful when the steering gear on Manchester broke down and it veered towards Port Chalmers. The journey continued until Avila Star left the convoy, not being in the operation and on 20 July, nearing Gibraltar, HMAS Nestor delivered sealed orders to the merchant ships. During the remaining daylight the convoy exercised and then began the passage of the Strait of Gibraltar.

=== Force X ===
To escort the convoy to Gibraltar, the Home Fleet detached the battleship HMS Nelson (to join Force H) the cruisers HMS Edinburgh (flagship of Rear-Admiral Neville Syfret), Manchester and Arethusa, the fast minelaying cruiser HMS Manxman, the fleet destroyers HMS Cossack, Maori, Sikh, Lightning, Nestor and the Hunt-class destroyers HMS Avon Vale, Eridge and Farndale.

=== Force H ===
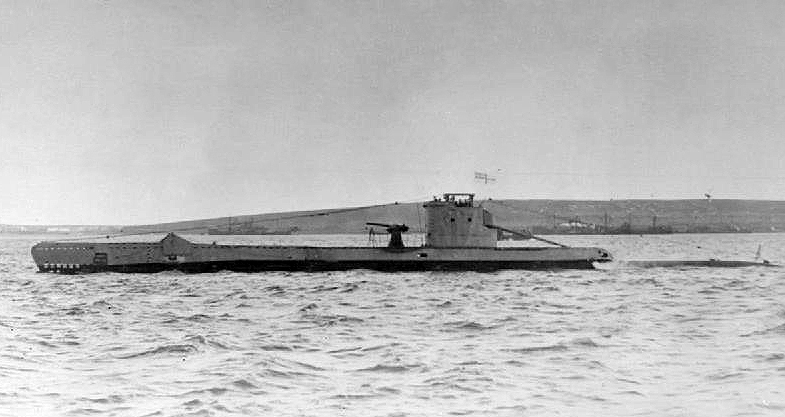
Photograph of HMS Urge in 1941

Force H comprised the aircraft carrier HMS Ark Royal with 27 Fulmars of 807 Naval Air Squadron (NAS) and 808 NAS. Seven Swordfish torpedo bombers, reinforcements to be delivered to Malta were also on Ark Royal. The battleship Nelson and the cruisers Edinburgh Manchester and Arethusa (joining from Force X) the battlecruiser HMS Renown, the fast minelayer Manxman and the destroyers HMS Duncan, Faulknor, Fearless, Foxhound, Firedrake, Foresight, Fury and Forester participated. Force S was composed of the oiler RFA Brown Ranger with the destroyer HMS Beverley.

The returning ships from Malta, Convoy MG 1 had the destroyer HMS Encounter as an escort. Submarines based at Alexandria were to participate by lying off Italian ports, ready to ambush the Regia Marina if it sailed.HMS Olympus and HNLMS O-21 patrolled off Naples, HMS Urge off Palermo, HMS Upholder off Marettimo (western Sicily) HMS P32 off Cagliari (southern Sardinia) HMS Utmost in the southern Tyrrhenian Sea, to the north of Messina (north-east Sicily) with HMS Unique and HMS Upright in the Strait of Messina.

== Convoy GM 1 ==
=== 21 July ===
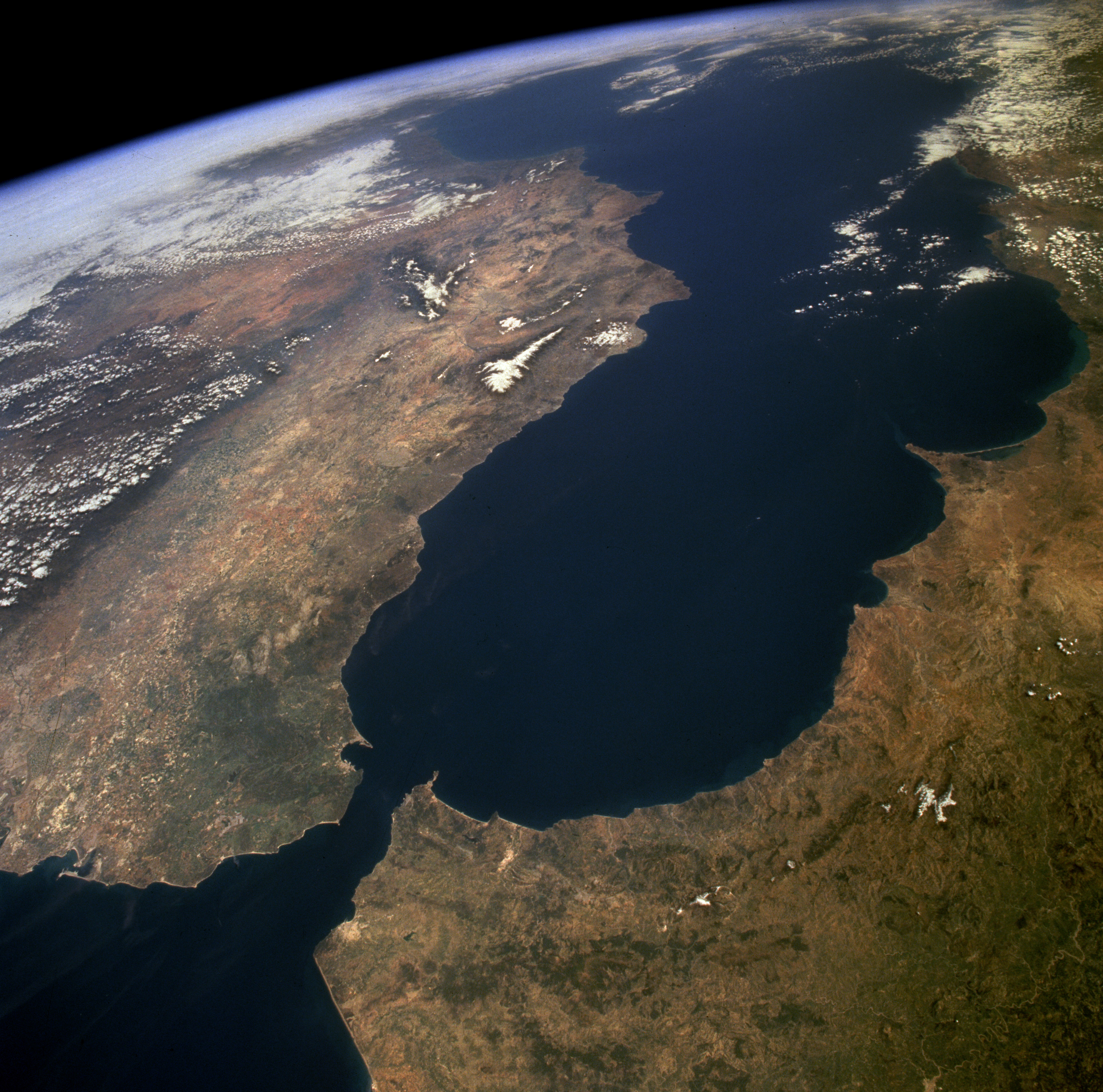
Satellite photograph of the Strait of Gibraltar and the western Mediterranean

The convoy entered the Mediterranean through fog and squally weather. Each merchant ship streamed a fog buoy that sent up a water plume for the ship behind to follow. Visibility got so bad that the merchant ships turned on their navigation lights until they emerged from the fog and closed formation at 14 kn (26 km/h; 16 mph). Some of the ships put into Gibraltar and escorts docked to fuel and transfer troops. Around 3:30 a.m. on 21 July, Somerville ordered some of the ships in Gibraltar to sail, with the fog having lifted and the wind dropping. Leinster, carrying Royal Air Force (RAF) ground crews for Beaufighter units on Malta, sailed but went aground in a patch of fog off Carnero Point and it was left behind, there being no time to embark its passengers on another ship.

Pasteur had ended its voyage at Gibraltar and there were delays in embarking its troops on other ships, leading later to a sharp complaint from the Admiralty to the War Office for inefficiency. Convoy GM 1 the convoy to Malta comprised Melbourne Star, Sydney Star, City of Pretoria. Port Chalmers, Durham and Deucalion, intended to sail at 14 kn (26 km/h; 16 mph). The fuelling of destroyers and cruisers had gone well, with only the disorganisation of the transfers from Pasteur and the grounding of Leinster causing problems. About 5,500 army and RAF personnel were embarked on Manchester, Arethusa, Cossack, Maori and Sikh, that had put into Gibraltar to collect them; other personnel were aboard the merchant ships.

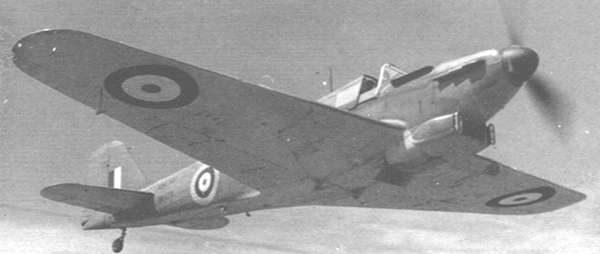
Example of a Fulmar Mk II

The weather was windy and foggy until well after dawn, that obstructed the assembly of the ships into cruising formation, off Gibraltar, under air cover from the local Sunderland flying boats. Ark Royal kept its Fulmars at readiness and its Swordfish torpedo bombers out of the air, to avoid advertising that it had sailed. No Italian submarines were discovered but two merchant ships were seen during the day. The oiler Brown Ranger was seen by the Sunderlands and reported as Leinster, causing confusion until the discrepancy was resolved. The reciprocal Convoy MG 1 from Malta also sailed with one destroyer as escort. During the afternoon, Force H passed Convoy GM 1 and diverged to the north-east, until about 30 nmi (56 km; 35 mi) away and slowed to 18 kn (33 km/h; 21 mph).

=== 22 July ===
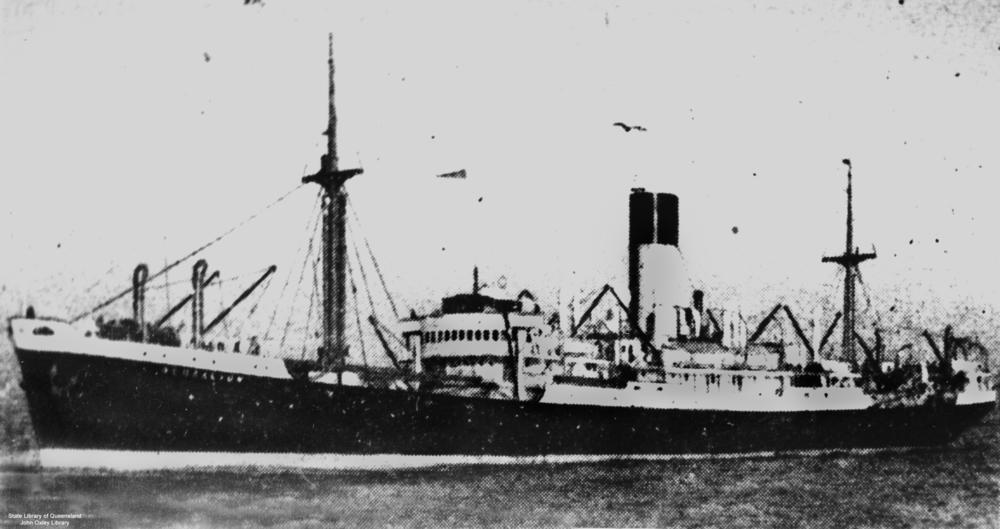
MV Deucalion

Reconnaissance aircraft from 69 Squadron at Malta were sent to observe the Italian fleet at Taranto, one Maryland shooting down a CANT Z.506 Airone (Heron) near Syracuse in the south-east of Sicily. Malta Blenheims and Swordfish continued to attack Italian convoys, the German ammunition ship Preussen being hit and blown up, that set a tanker, MV Brarena (6,996 GRT), on fire, that was later torpedoed twice, drifted onto the Kerkennah Bank and was abandoned. An Italian aircraft flew over Force H but not enough to see the convoy and Force X beyond. The destroyers of Force X spent the day refuelling from Brown Ranger in pairs, taking about ten hours; the oiler then turned about with Beverley and headed for Gibraltar. Force H turned back for two hours, closing the distance with the convoy, then turned east again at 2:00 p.m.

Aircraft were seen at a distance but Fulmars from Ark Royal failed to catch them because of high cloud. To keep radio silence, Somerville and Syfret passed messages via a Sunderland, using Morse code, that Force H would come closer to the convoy on the morrow. In the afternoon, radar picked up more aircraft but the Fulmars failed to find them again. As dusk fell, Hermione mistakenly directed the fighters onto a Catalina flying boat from Gibraltar, that was attacked and a gunner wounded. Force H launched paravanes (devices to explode mines harmlessly) and reversed course again for an hour and a half, the distance between the force and the convoy falling to 20 nmi (37 km; 23 mi). Just before midnight the Italian submarine Diaspro discharged a salvo of torpedoes.that were spotted by Nestor on the starboard side and the force evaded them with a starboard turn, four torpedoes exploding when their runs ended and one passed ahead of Nestor and one underneath. Nestor made three depth charge attacks but the submarine escaped with minor damage. During the evening, nine S.79sil of 283 Squadriglia, from Sardinia, made an abortive search for the convoy.

=== 23 July ===
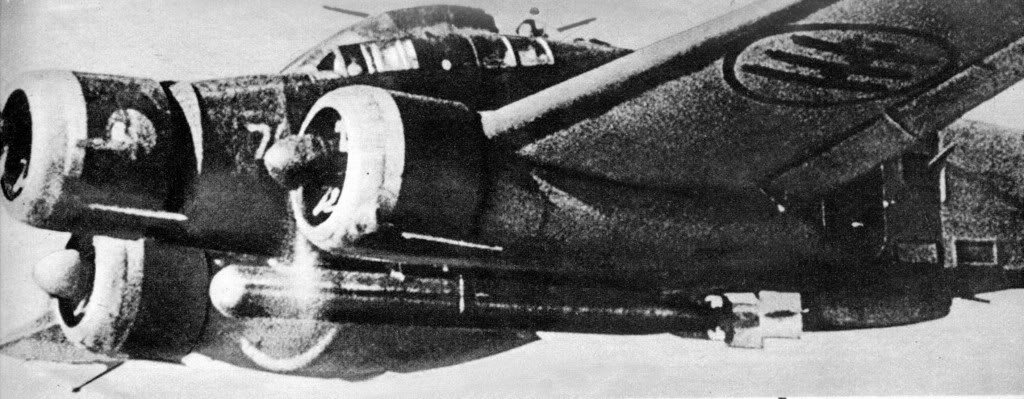
Photograph of a Savoia-Marchetti SM.79 Sparviero torpedo bomber

The Mediterranean Fleet began its deception, sailing two battleships with cruisers and destroyers from Alexandria towards the west, ready to reverse course after nightfall. Near dawn, Fulmars took off from Ark Royal and two Italian reconnaissance aircraft were spotted from the convoy but attempts to direct the Fulmars to an interception failed, due to the sun low on the horizon and the inability of the ship radars to detect aircraft so low and at such distance. By 7:00 a.m. wireless interception of Italian communications showed that the convoy had been discovered. At 7:45 a.m. Force H converged on Force X and the convoy as it entered the area of aircraft flying from southern Sardinia. Renown and Hermione joined Ark Royal on the port side of the convoy for anti-aircraft defence and keeping room to manoeuvre for Ark Royal. Nelson, Manchester, Hermione, Arethusa and Manxman sailed closer in to the convoy to starboard and the rear as it headed eastwards, zig-zagging at about 13.5 kn (25.0 km/h; 15.5 mph).

The destroyers were arrayed in a big crescent ahead of the big ships and freighters. A light breeze from the north-east had blown the clouds away and the sea state was slight [waves 1 ft 8 in to 4 ft 1 in (0.5 to 1.25 m) high]. At 9:15 a.m. about 60 nmi (110 km; 69 mi) distance, several groups of aircraft had been spotted by radar. At 9:45 a.m. eight S.79sil Sparviero (Sparrowhawk) torpedo bombers and more S.79 medium bombers of 32° Stormo BT, with five CANT Z.1007bis of 51° Gruppo Autonomo, bombed from south to north as the convoy and escorts opened fire. Seven more Fulmars took off to join the four on patrol and attacked the Italian aircraft head on. Red section of 808 NAS shot down one S.79sil and a second was claimed jointly by 807 NAS against accurate return fire from the S.79 gunners. Three Fulmars suffered engine damage as they chased the bombers after the first pass and came down into the sea, the crews being rescued by destroyers. Five Fulmars climbed to catch the CANTs but they escaped. The remaining S.79sils flew low in three small groups as the destroyers, still in a crescent, opened fire and two aircraft turned and crossed the line of advance to aim at Fearless on the far right of the crescent.

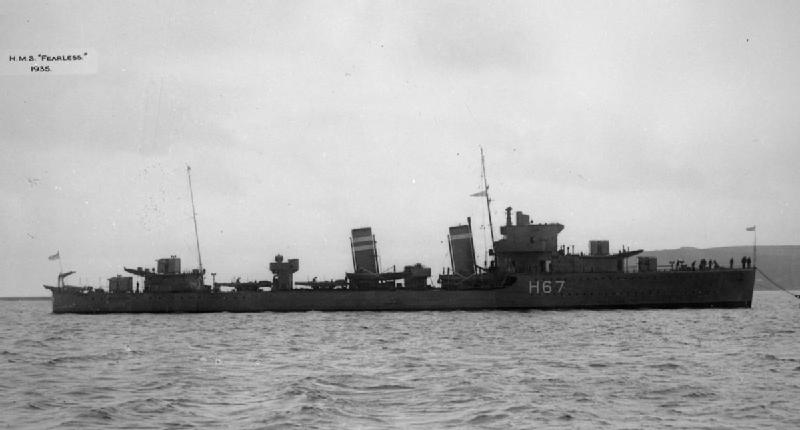
HMS Fearless was sunk by a Savoia-Marchetti SM.79 while escorting Convoy GM 1.

The two Sparvieros to port of the convoy attacked the freighters, as did the two on the starboard side. Quickly, Manchester was hit by a torpedo from the port side, the bomber being shot down by Manchester and the crew rescued. Two bombers of 280 Squadriglia that aimed at Fearless dropped their torpedoes from 70 ft (21 m) at 1,500 and 800 yd (1,370 and 730 m). The first torpedo passed 90 yd (82 m) ahead of Fearless but the second, on a shallow setting, broke the surface about 30 ft (9.1 m) off the ship, turned left and hit it. The explosion stopped the engines, jammed the rudder to port and cut the power. The fuel tanks to the rear and the stern of the ship caught fire and 25 or 27 men were killed. Ammunition exploded and some was put overboard. Forester was ordered to take off survivors and picked up men who had jumped overboard to avoid the fires. At 10:55 a.m. Forester torpedoed and sank the hulk at 37°40′N, 08°20′E, then rejoined the screen.

The medium bombing from height hit nothing and at 10:11 a.m. the five CANTs had bombed ineffectually from 17,000 ft (5,200 m), thought to have been affected by the Fulmars 1,000 ft (300 m) below and astern, trying to catch up. The Fulmars had shot down two S.79 bombers, damaged two more and the ships had shot down two of the S.79sil torpedo bombers. Six aircrew were rescued by Avon Vale and 32° Gruppo later recorded that a Fulmar had shot down one of its S.79s. There ws a lull as the ships sailed past Galita Island off the Tunisian coast and at 2:23 p.m. a signal was intercepted that showed the Italians had spotted Manchester and its escort retiring. At 4:43 p.m. radar detected aircraft to the north-west at 40 nmi (74 km; 46 mi)-range. A CANT Z.506B was guiding the four serviceable S.79s of 283 Squadriglia that were attacked by Fulmars of 808 NAS while 22 nmi (41 km; 25 mi) out from the convoy, shooting down a S.79 and damaging one that alighted on the sea off Cape Carbonara at the south-east end of Sardinia, the crew being rescued. After being damaged, the CANT and the two surviving S.79s turned away.

==== Skerki Banks ====
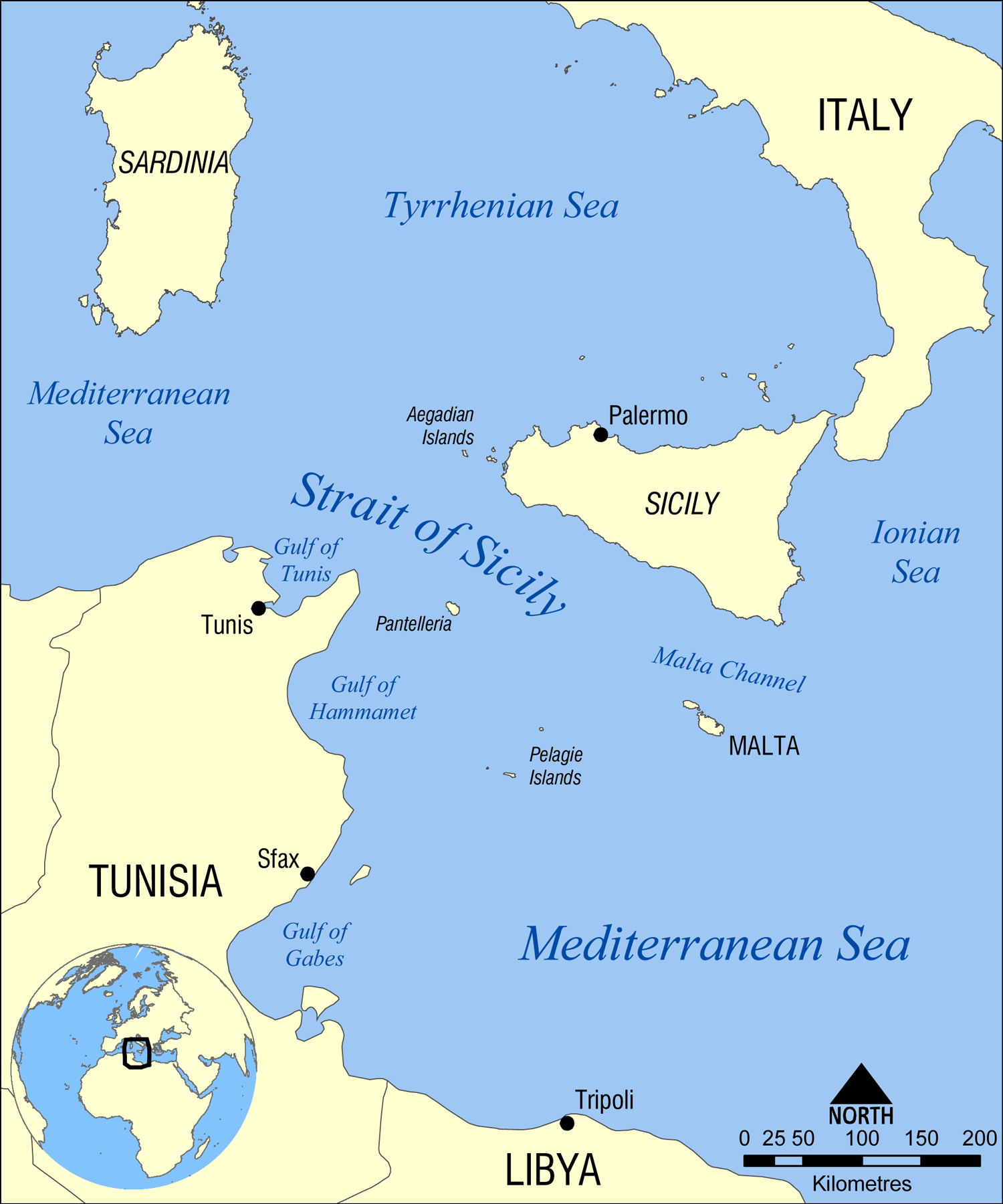
Strait of Sicily and the Skerki Banks

During the afternoon the convoy came into the range of aircraft from Sicily and Malta. At 4:20 p.m. five Beaufighters took off from Malta and another six took off at 5:03 p.m. arriving over the convoy as it passed Bizerta on the north coast of Tunisia. The Regia Aeronautica on Sicily sent S.79sil torpedo bombers of 278a Squadriglia with Fiat CR.42 Falco (Falcon) fighter escorts of 23° Gruppo CT and a second wave of S.79s of 10° Stormo BT and 30° Stormo BT, Italian Junkers Ju 87s (Ju 87) of 101° Gruppo TaB and 27 Macchi C.200 Saetta (Lightning) fighter escorts of 54° Stormo CT. One bomb hit damaged Firedrake but 278a Squadriglia was intercepted by Beaufighters near the Califfe Islands, one Beaufighter being shot down. An S.79 was attacked by a Beaufighter over the convoy and flew away pouring smoke; the Macchi 200s attacked a "Blenheim" and lost one fighter shot down.

At 5:15 p.m., closing on the Skerki Banks, Force H turned back, leaving Hermione to take the place of Manchester in Force X and to meet the ships of Convoy MG 1 and Encounter. Several Fulmars remained over the convoy until Beaufighters from Malta arrived at 6:30 p.m. then flew west to land on Ark Royal, Force H finding four Italian flyers sitting on their S.79, that had been shot down two hours before. Manchester and Avon Vale were spotted 100 nmi (190 km; 120 mi) to the west of Force H at 6:05 p.m. and attacked by S.79s from out of the sun. Avon Vale advanced into the sun 2 nmi (3.7 km; 2.3 mi) ahead of Manchester; its gunfire and that of the forward armament of Manchester, led to the bombers making a half-hearted attack.

=== Evening, 23 July ===
As the convoy entered the Sicilian Narrows, it formed two columns, with Firedrake leading the left column with its minesweeping gear out (followed by Edinburgh, Durham, Port Chalmers, Deucalion and Arethusa) and Foxhound the right column also with its minesweeping gear out (followed by Manxman, Melbourne Star, Sydney Star, City of Pretoria and Hermione). The columns were five cables (an Admiralty cable was 1/10 of a nautical mile or 1/10 of 1.151 land miles) apart at three cable intervals. Five cables further out, on either side, were Cossack, Maori, Sikh, Nestor, Foxhound, Firedrake, Farndale and Eridge, keeping the convoy and escorts to a 1.5 nmi (2.8 km; 1.7 mi) frontage. At 7:00 p.m. four torpedo bombers attacked at low altitude from the south, one was shot down by the ships, Edinburgh and Hermione managed to evade the torpedoes. Having let the bombers attack, at 7:45 p.m. the Beaufighters, rather than obey orders to climb from 8,000 ft (2,400 m) to 10,000 ft (3,000 m) and circle 5 nmi (9.3 km; 5.8 mi) east-north-east of the convoy, ready for the attackers but followed them and came under fire from the ships, turned back, with the Italian bombers 3,000 ft (910 m) higher. Firedrake suffered damage in its boiler rooms and steering apparatus. Syfret ordered Eridge to tow Firedrake and head for Gibraltar, beginning at 8:38 p.m. (Note: With a jammed rudder, Firedrake swerved from side to side but by midnight it was under control and making 10 kn (19 km/h; 12 mph). Eridge continued the tow until 9:30 a.m. on 25 July when Firedrake was able to steam at 9 kn (17 km/h; 10 mph) and was not attacked when Settler of Convoy MG 1 was attacked within sight by three Italian aircraft.)

=== Night, 23/24 July ===
With Firedrake out of action, Cossack took its place, past the Skerki Banks and 25 nmi (46 km; 29 mi) north of Cape Bon the convoy turned to the north-east, to pass near the north of Pantellaria, to avoid Avis minefields but had the added bonus at 9:05 p.m. of aircraft failing to find the convoy. Italian assumptions that the convoy would proceed in a straight line led them to omit air reconnaissance around nightfall. By 11:00 p.m. the convoy was heading to the south-east with Italian aircraft dropping flares to the south, the convoy skirting the Axis minefields that ran north-south from Marettimo in the Aegadian Islands west of Sicily, via Pantellaria to Lampedusa. Without Firedrake the left column was vulnerable as Cossack, Durham, Port Chalmers and Deucalion had no minesweeping equipment but all went well as the convoy turned south-south-east into the Italian convoy lane. Nestor was thought to have bumped a mine and at 0:46 a.m. Foxhound, at the head of the right column, caught a mine that it had to clear. Closing on Pantellaria at 2:46 a.m. Cossack detected three small objects on its radar.

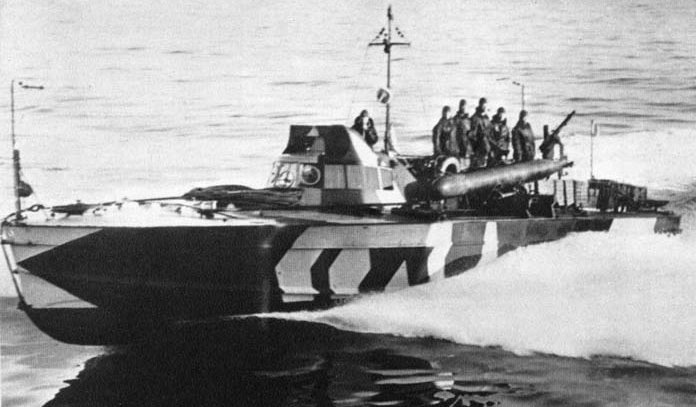
Example of an Italian MAS (motoscafo armato silurante)

At 2:50 a.m. flickers of light and the sound of motors starting up suggested the presence of torpedo-boats that turned out to be MAS 532 (motoscafo armato silurante, torpedo armed motorboat) and MAS 533. Cossack and Edinburgh illuminated the area astern from where the sounds had come and saw one of the MAS and commenced firing, as did Manxman second ship in the right column. The MAS fired a torpedo and withdrew, damaged. Two torpedoes passed by near Edinburgh. A MAS boat lay in wait, between the left column and the screening destroyers, let the convoy go by but was spotted by Farndale and Arethusa. The ships opened fire until the MAS was lost to view astern. One MAS had been sunk in the engagement and one damaged but the rest of the flotilla continued the attack.

At 3:05 a.m. watchers on Edinburgh spotted a wake and heard engine noise; A MAS was illuminated by searchlight and fire was opened at 1,500 to 2,000 yd (1,400 to 1,800 m), the MAS being deluged with tracer. Edinburgh fired its main armament and nothing was visible afterwards. A MAS was detected by the Asdic on Cossack just before it was sighted from the bridge and the captain ordered that Cossack accelerate and a turn to port, to ram the MAS, that was near the port bow and that fired a torpedo as it crossed the bow of Cossack after which Cossack opened fire and the tearing of wood was heard. For twenty minutes engine noise was heard on Cossack and Edinburgh but only a glimpse of a MAS withdrawing was seen. It appeared that both sides were surprised, the MAS appearing to be stationary, rather than waiting in ambush. Despite radar and Asdic, the wakes of the MAS were more significant for the British to engage them. (Note: Syfret later reported that for five hours, Maori eavesdropped on Italian wireless transmissions and that three voices became increasingly agitated. Syfret suggested embarking an Italian-speaker and a desire for flashless propellant for his star shells.) The skirmishing with the MAS boats caused some confusion in the convoy, with searchlights sweeping about and tracer moving horizontally, marring the night vision of bridge crews. Sydney Star was half-way down the right column that was hit by machine-gun fire from an adjacent ship that hit the starboard lifeboats.

==== Sydney Star ====
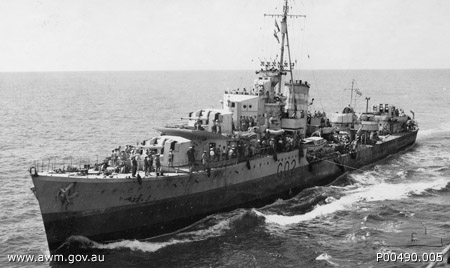
Photograph of the Australian destroyer HMAS Nestor

The captain of Sydney Star saw a wake parallel to the ship within 50 yd (46 m) off the port side and then a torpedo hit amidships on number 3 hold, before course could be altered. Sydney Star began to list and lost control as its engines stopped. The ship had 464 gunners on board of the 32nd Light Anti-Aircraft Regiment RA on top of the grain, ammunition and naval equipment. The captain ordered abandon ship and the troops mustered at the lifeboat stations where the damage to the starboard lifeboats was discovered. On Nestor, where the explosion in Sydney Star had gone unseen, the captain investigated a merchant ship that had fallen out of line and saw that lifeboats were being lowered for no apparent reason, Sydney Star did not reply to signals until it reported that there was 30 ft (9.1 m) of water in number 3 hold after a torpedo hit. (Note: It was later discovered that there was also a hit from a stray round from one of the escorts.)

Sydney Star was 4 nmi (7.4 km; 4.6 mi) off Pantellaria, with the sound of MAS engines in the vicinity, when Nestor came alongside on the starboard side, ordering one of the port lifeboats to get out of the way. Planks and other means of crossing to the destroyer were rigged and for fifty minutes Nestor took on 487 soldiers and 23 crew; three MAS being seen nearby during the embarkation. After a certain amount of discussion between the captain of Nestor and the captain of Sydney Star, at 5:56 a.m. the freighter had 12 ft (3.7 m) of water in number 1 hold, 7 ft (2.1 m) in 3 hold and 30 ft (9.1 m) in number 3 hold. Sydney Star got under way to make the 130 nmi (240 km; 150 mi) to Malta and steamed at 12 kn (22 km/h; 14 mph), managing 14.5 kn (26.9 km/h; 16.7 mph) by 7:00 a.m. on 24 July, with Nestor circling the ship. There was a low mist that morning and no more surface attacks. Lagging behind the convoy, at 6:15 a.m. two S.79sil were driven off by anti-aircraft fire and two being deterred from attacking at 6:50 a.m. The captain requested help from the convoy and Syfret detached Hermione.

Before noon, Sydney Star was attacked by medium bombers and at 9:30 a.m. bombs fell on either side of the ship. Sydney Star manoeuvred to make a difficult target and the three ships managed to hit one bomber that left a trail of smoke. The ship was still taking on water, the abrupt helm movements making things worse and a short cut north of Malta to get to Grand Harbour was taken that allowed the ship to reduce speed to lessen the strain on the bulkheads and tugs were requested. At 10:30 a.m. the Regia Aeronautica made a determined attempt to sink the ship with S.79 medium bombers, S.79sil torpedo bombers and Italian Ju 87 dive bombers. The torpedo bombers were attacked by two Beaufighters but in chasing some of them off, the others were left to attack the ship. Captain Holt of Sydney Star turned towards the torpedo bombers as the three ships opened fire at two of the S.79sil passing close by, one torpedo exploding on contact with the sea. Hermione engaged the medium bombers that near-missed Sydney Star and stopped its engines. Two Ju 87s dived on Sydney Star and Nestor but missed both. When 18 nmi (33 km; 21 mi) from Grand Harbour, with the ship sinking, Captain Holt ordered full speed to the tugs West Dean, Robust and Ancient and at 2:00 p.m. reached port. (Note: Divers found a hole 40 by 16 ft (12.2 by 4.9 m) in the hull and later, the owners judged that the ship was saved by the audacity of going as fast as possible, ignoring minefields and heading straight for Malta.)

=== 24 July ===
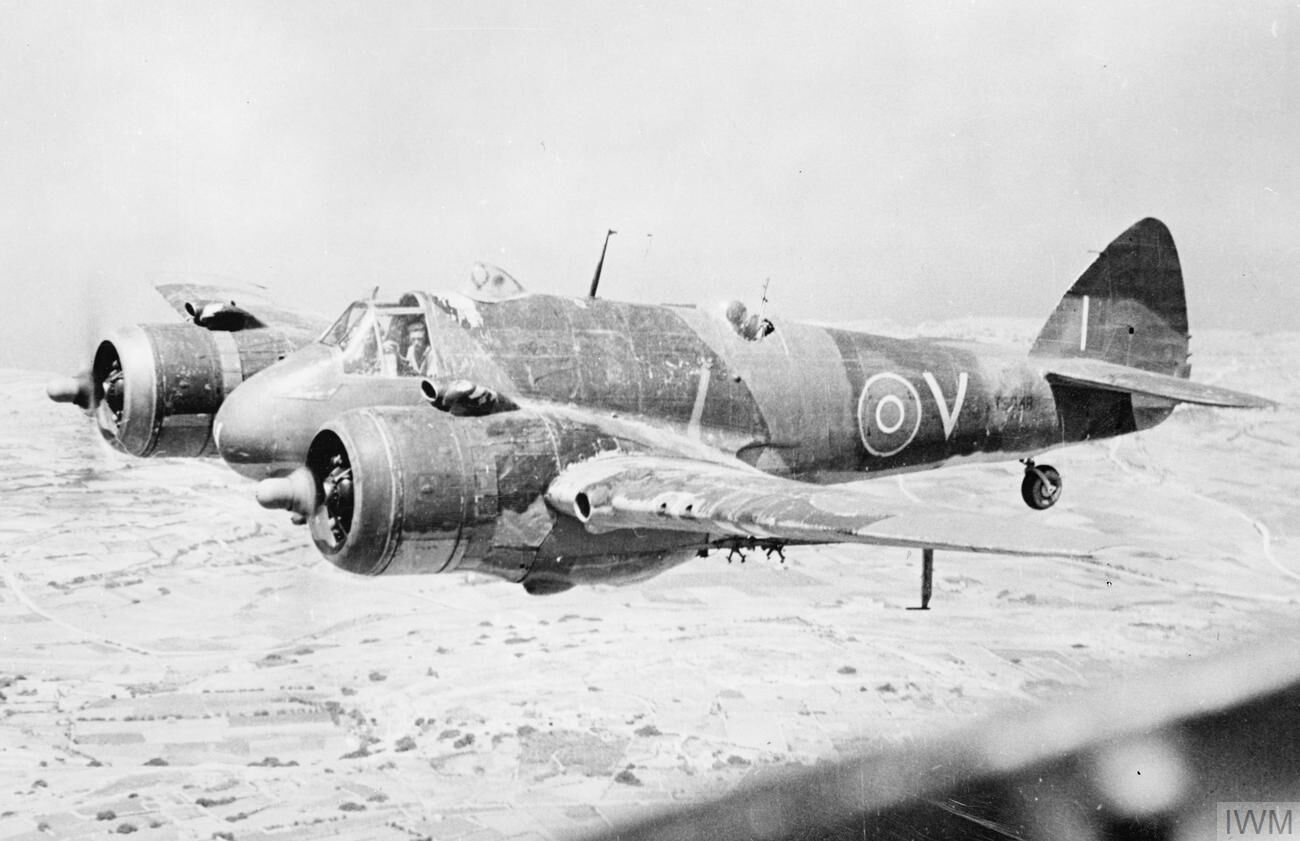
Beaufighter Mark IC of 272 Squadron over Malta

The Mediterranean Fleet deception operation continued, with the fleet having turned eastwards in the dark and two submarines sending fictitious signals from where the ships would have been, had they remained on a westwards course, giving the Italians the impression that the Mediterranean Fleet was advancing into the central Mediterranean. When Hermione detached, the convoy was 30 nmi (56 km; 35 mi) off Gozo and easily within range of Malta aircraft, marred slightly because the Beaufighters failed to identify themselves, arrived at low altitude and were fired on.

The Beaufighters also took no notice of instructions from Edinburgh, the fighter direction ship for the convoy. Control of the Fleet Air Arm Fulmars was passed on to Hermione as the fighter direction officer tried to get the Beaufighters to conform. During the fiasco, three Italian torpedo bombers attacked and dropped their torpedoes outside the destroyer screen, as they were engaged by them. The convoy took evasive action but no torpedoes were seen.

The plan to send the escorts to Malta while the convoy steamed at 14 to 15 kn (26 to 28 km/h; 16 to 17 mph) under an air umbrella began, Edinburgh, Arethusa and Manxman steaming ahead to Grand Harbour, entering at 11:30 a.m. to the cheers of the populace. The convoy, having gone the long way round Malta, saw off an air attack after the cruisers had detached and slowed as the crews watched Sydney Star arrive. The ships entered Grand Harbour at 3:30 p.m., Deucalion leading then Port Chalmers, City of Pretoria, Melbourne Star and Durham, with the destroyers Farndale, Foxhound, Cossack, Maori and Sikh; the escorts were quickly unloaded. Beaufighters attacked Italian Ju 87s and claimed several shot down but they suffered no loss.

The cruisers and Manxman sailed from Malta at 6:00 p.m. and the destroyers, once fuelled, at 6:45 p.m. except for Farndale that had engine trouble. While the ships were swiftly prepared, Syfret complained to Air Chief Marshal Arthur Longmore and on the return journey, the Beaufighters performed better, keeping S.79s off the ships as Force X followed Convoy MG 1. Force H turned to rendezvous with Force X at 3:30 a.m. on 25 July, Ark Royal having sent the six Swordfish to Malta two hours earlier, that arrived intact. Before dawn a light has been seen to the north-east and a Swordfish from Ark Royal was sent carrying depth charges in case it was a submarine. It was found to be the hospital ship Sorrento looking for shot down Italian aircrew from 23 July that was left to its task. As dawn began to break other Swordfish went aloft on anti-submarine sorties and as the sun came up, Fulmars took off.

=== 25−26 July ===
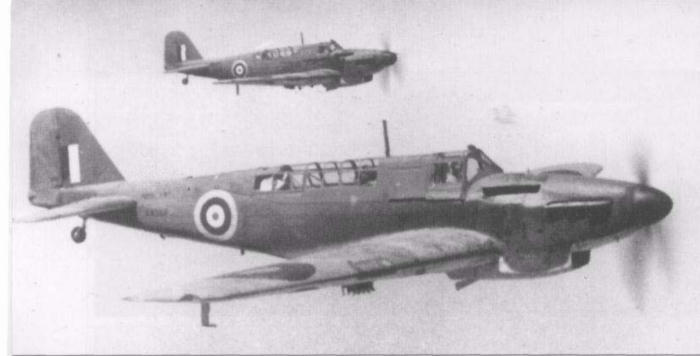
Two Fulmars over the Mediterranean in 1941

Far to the west, on 24 July, Force H had caught up with Manchester that, with Avon Vale, was making 11 kn (20 km/h; 13 mph). Aircraft from 2 Squadra Area from Sicily went on patrol and made various claims of ships sunk but all were erroneous. Behind Force H, Firedrake and Eridge moving at 8 kn (15 km/h; 9.2 mph) passed south of the Galite Isles at 10:00 a.m. Early on the morning of 25 July, two sections of Fulmars (two per section) were sent to engage Italian aircraft and a CANT Z.506B was damaged by a pair of Fulmars of 807 NAS. When the Fulmars attacked another CANT, it shot down one of the Fulmars, the crew being killed; another section of Fulmars arrived and all three shot down the CANT, four of the crew being rescued.

At 7:45 a.m. Fulmars from Ark Royal reported the Force X cruisers to be 22 nmi (41 km; 25 mi) east of Force X with the destroyers astern. The forces joined soon afterwards 26 nmi (48 km; 30 mi) north-west of the Galite Islands and headed westwards. Nelson could only manage 23 kn (43 km/h; 26 mph) and the ships had to turn into wind when aircraft took off or alighted on Ark Royal. Aircraft from Aeronautica della Sardegna were also out looking for the British ships. At 11:00 a.m. 808 NAS attacked approximately twenty S.79sil that shot down two Fulmars, one crew being killed and the other surviving and claiming one S.79 and another damaged; Red Section returned to Ark Royal and made a similar claim; one S.79 was shown shot down in Italian records.

When an Italian bomber formation was 69 nmi (128 km; 79 mi) out from the ships, Maori lost power and was left behind with Sikh and Fulmars circling above. After an hour Maori began to move and managed 17 kn (31 km/h; 20 mph), gradually accelerating to 27 kn (50 km/h; 31 mph). There were no more air attacks on the warships but there were several submarine scares. Forester was sent ahead with wounded from Fearless and a rendezvous with Brown Ranger and Beverley to fuel, all ships having enough to reach Gibraltar. In the afternoon the fleet turned east to make sure that the ships arrived before dawn broke, passing Firedrake, Eridge and Avon Vale that were 88 nmi (163 km; 101 mi) east of Cabo de Gata and making 9 kn (17 km/h; 10 mph) all ships overflown by two Swordfish on anti-submarine patrol. Eight more Swordfish took off to make a practise attack. At 3:00 a.m. on 26 July, Arethusa, Hermione and Manxman were released to proceed at 24 kn (44 km/h; 28 mph) and at 6:00 a.m. Ark Royal, Edinburgh and four of the destroyers did the same. The seven destroyers, Nelson and Renown conducted an exercise with the heavy coastal guns of Gibraltar that were severely criticised by Somerville. The two big ships reached Gibraltar at 9:00 a.m., Foxhound being sent back to join Firedrake.

==== Operation MG 1 ====
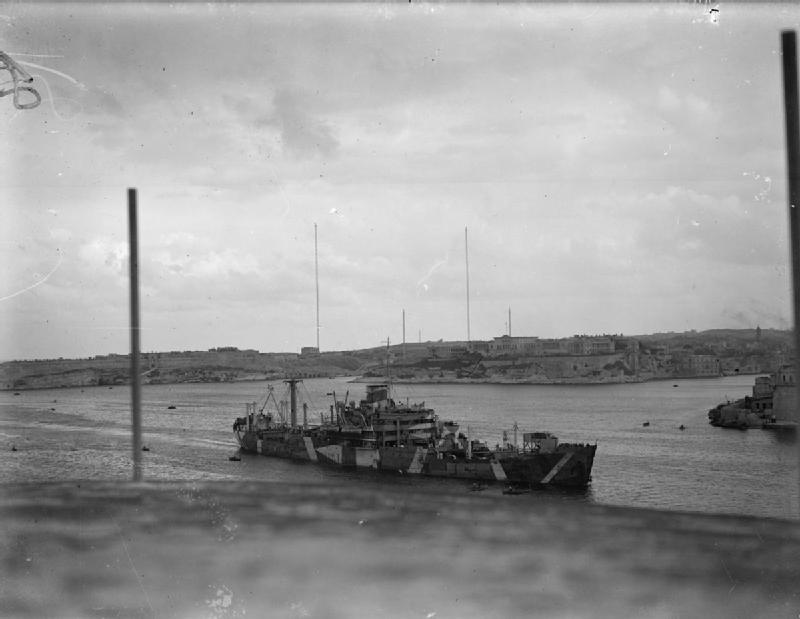
Breconshire moored in Grand Harbour

Convoy MG 1 sailed on 23 July, due to be escorted back to Gibraltar by Force H, just as Convoy GM 1 was entering the Sicilian Narrows, the ships of Convoy MG 1, carrying British women and children evacuees were heading the other way. At dusk, east of Pantellaria, the ships formed three groups, successively to pass 20 nmi (37 km; 23 mi) south of the island, to pass Cape Bon inside Vichy French territorial waters, pass south of Zembra Island, 10 nmi (19 km; 12 mi) off the Cani Rocks just off the Tunisian coast. On 24 July, the faster group had pulled ahead and the ships were strung out for 60 nmi (110 km; 69 mi) near Galita Island.

Breconshire and Talabot were making 17 kn (31 km/h; 20 mph), Thermopylæ, Amerika and Encounter were steaming at 14 kn (26 km/h; 16 mph) followed by Settler and Hoegh Hood at 12 kn (22 km/h; 14 mph). Svenor had been delayed by an accident and had just departed from Malta and Force H kept on west until Manchester was out of range of the Sardinia-based aircraft, where the destroyers HMS Vidette and Vimy from Gibraltar were due to rendezvous with Manchester.

Four S.79sil attacked Thermopylæ, Amerika and Encounter at 12:30 p.m. and four S.79 medium bombers at 12:50 p.m. The torpedoes missed and the medium bombers dropped between Thermpylae and America. Breconshire and Talabot were attacked at 1:40 p.m. north of Bône (now Annaba) but these also fell clear. After thirty minutes a bomber near-missed Breconshire and Encounter accelerated towards it and Talabot in case of another attack, evading medium bombers at 5:40 p.m. Encounter reached Breconshire at 9:40 p.m. and the voyage ended at dawn on 26 July. Settler and Hoegh Hood were attacked at 5:11 p.m. and 6:15 p.m. Hoegh Hood was torpedoed, falling astern of Settler and reaching Gibraltar at 9:15 a.m. on 27 July. Thermopylæ and Amerika had arrived at 3:30 p.m. on 26 July and Svenor reached safety at 5:00 a.m. on 28 July.

Somerville was aghast when he found out that the ships carried evacuees and said that had he known he would have sent a destroyer for each group. The local complaint about the Beaufighters was pursued and in September, the Admiralty, in London, told the Air Staff that there were serious shortcomings in the conduct of RAF aircraft when escorting ships and both services acknowledged that the standard of aircraft recognition was unsatisfactory. Somerville admitted that the safe return of Convoy MG 1 was unexpected. The quiescence off the Italian fleet he thought had been due to the diversion by the Mediterranean Fleet and the submarine patrols.

== Aftermath ==
=== Analysis ===
The convoy operation delivered around 65,000 long tons (66,000 t) of cargo, with sufficient food to feed the island for three months, spare Merlin engines for the Hurricanes, 10,000 long tons (10,000 t) of ammunition and torpedoes for the 10th Submarine Flotilla. Famine had been postponed, despite the spoiling of much of the food carried on Sydney Star and Italian propaganda that 70,000 GRT of merchant ships had been sunk. Not knowing when the Luftwaffe would return to the western Mediterranean and the reinforcement of Malta increasing the consumption of food, fuel and stores made another GM convoy essential, that became Operation Halberd (24–27 September). Magic carpet missions by submarines, most from Alexandria, usually carrying white oils, provided sufficient fuel for the RAF and FAA aircraft to keep going for three days.

In his report, Somerville commended the captain of Nestor, the captain of Sydney Star and the chief engineer, as did Vice-Admiral Wilbraham Ford, the head of the dockyard and the governor, Lieutenant-General William Dobbie. Somerville complained that his instructions for the training of the convoy were not delivered, leading to Syfret exercising the ships once in the Mediterranean. Syfret was not as censorious and that the behaviour of the merchant ships was in large part responsible for the success of the convoy and commended the conduct of David MacFarlane, the convoy commodore and captain of Melbourne Star. Syfret also complimented the crew of Durham that managed the 14 kn (26 km/h; 16 mph) convoy speed, despite difficulties with the port engine. Sydney Star was left at Malta under repair until December.

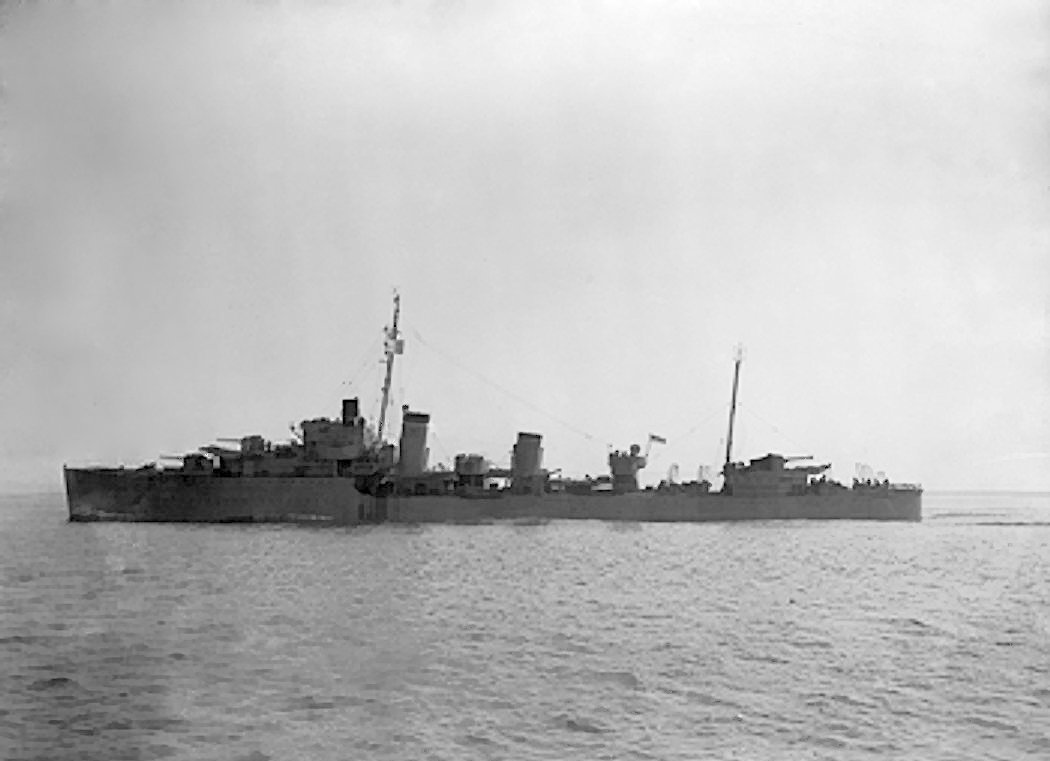
HMS Duncan (photographed in March 1943)

Rear-Admiral Neville Syfret, the commander of Force X, considered that in air attacks, British land-based fighter crews needed more training and a detailed understanding of the needs of the ships below, to be able to work in concert with the fleet. The Italian medium bombers were accurate unless the formation was intercepted by British fighters before it could bomb and that the torpedo bombers were unwilling to risk short range attacks and dropped their torpedoes from long- and medium-range. Syfret was full of praise for the merchant navy crews.

The British naval historian, Stephen Roskill, wrote in 1957 that the operation was a complete success, going beyond the most optimistic expectations. That only one destroyer was lost and nearly all the supplies for Malta arrived and the reinforcements, less those stranded when Leinster ran aground had reached the island. "The plan was cleverly designed and brilliantly executed". Th deceptions and diversions had worked and the Italians were deceived as to British intentions. The skill of the FAA pilots in Ark Royal and the determination of the cruiser and destroyer crews and the contribution of the merchant ship crews were important for the success of the convoy. On 31 January the 1,800 RAF and army personnel waiting at Gibraltar were embarked on three cruisers and two destroyers that made a dash for Malta and arrived on 2 August, unloaded, departed the same afternoon and were back at Gibraltar on 4 August.

Giorgio Giorgerini wrote in 2001 that Admiral Bernotti wrote that "Supermarina did not attribute the proper importance to the news of the enemy's naval activity". The battleships Littorio, Vittorio Veneto and Duilio could have been sent against the convoy with three heavy cruisers and a destroyer screen. In the official history, Giuseppe Fioravanzo wrote that the antagonism between Admiral Inigo Campioni, the former commander of the battlefleet and his replacement, Admiral Angelo Iachino, over the conduct of the naval war, particularly after the recent defeats of the Battle of Cape Matapan, Operation Tiger and the Substance convoy, led to Campioni being transferred from Supermarina to the Aegean and replaced by Admiral Sansonetti, who had a much better relationship with Iachino, that improved the relationship between Supermarina and the battlefleet. In 2002, Greene and Massignani wrote that Supermarina thought that the operation was a magic carpet run to send aircraft reinforcements to Malta and sent only aircraft and light surface craft to engage the British; the torpedo bombers on Sardinia could play little part as their stock of torpedoes was almost exhausted. MAS 532 and MAS 533 escaped destruction during the night attack on 23/24 July.

=== Casualties ===
Ark Royal lost six Fulmars and two crews defending Convoy MG 1 and the Malta-bound ships of Convoy GM 1 from Gibraltar. At least 12 Axis aircraft were lost to FAA fighters and anti-aircraft fire from the escorts. One ship of Convoy MG 1 was damaged by a torpedo bomber on the voyage west. The Regia Aeronautica lost seven Savoia-Marchetti S.79 bombers and torpedo bombers, a CANT Z.506B bomber and a Macchi MC.200 fighter.

=== Subsequent operations ===
==== Raid on Grand Harbour ====
The Raid on Grand Harbour was an audacious attack on 26 July, by the X MAS of the Regia Marina, using explosive motor-boats (MTM) and manned torpedoes, when by coincidence, the Allied ships of Operation Substance were in Grand Harbour. The attackers with MTM explosive motorboat and frogmen destroyed the St Elmo Bridge when trying to enter the harbour, before being driven off by fire from the coastal defences. The X MAS group were killed outside the harbour, swam ashore to be taken prisoner or were killed attempting the return journey and the attack was the worst defeat suffered by X MAS in the war. Many of the two MAS crews and surviving X MAS men were killed when British fighters attacked the MAS on the morning of 26 July, along with two Macchi C.200 fighters shot down in dogfights. A Hurricane was shot down and the pilot rescued from MAS 452, which was used as a tender by the British.

==== Operation Style ====
The RAF contingent to be carried on Operation Substance had been left behind after Leinster ran aground was too numerous to travel by magic carpet submarine. The RAF ground crews were to be transported by fast warships and force X was constituted with Arethusa, Hermione, Manxman and t3o destroyers, that departed Gibraltar on 31 July with a 1,750-man RAF contingent and 130 long tons (130 t) of stores, arriving on 2 August, disembarked the men and stores then raced back to Force H west of the Galite Islands, as in Operation Substance. Force H had been conducting diversionary operations, causing the Italians to order invasion alerts in Sicily, Sardinia and the Tyrrhenian Sea. The operation was undisturbed except for Hermione ramming and sinking the Italian submarine Tembien at dawn on 2 August.

== British order of battle ==
=== Convoy WS 9c – Convoy GM 1 ===
Ships in Convoy WS 9c and those that sailed on in Convoy GM 1
| Ship | Year | Flag | GRT | Notes |
Convoy WS 9c
| SS Avila Star | 1927 | Merchant Navy | 14,443 | Not part of GM 1 |
| MV Leinster | 1937 | Merchant Navy | 4,302 | Grounded at Gibraltar, 1,000 troops left behind by GM 1 |
| SS Pasteur | 1939 | Merchant Navy | 29,293 | 4,200 troops, transferred at Gibraltar |
Convoy GM 1
| SS City of Pretoria | 1937 | Merchant Navy | 8,049 | |
| MV Deucalion | 1930 | Merchant Navy | 7,740 | |
| MV Durham | 1934 | Merchant Navy | 10,893 | |
| MV Melbourne Star | 1936 | Merchant Navy | 12,086 | |
| MV Port Chalmers | 1933 | Merchant Navy | 8,535 | |
| MV Sydney Star | 1936 | Merchant Navy | 11,219 | 24 July, hit by torpedo from MAS boat |

=== Convoy MG 1 ===
Merchant ships
| Ship | Year | Flag | GRT | Notes |
Group 1
| HMS Breconshire | 1939 | United Kingdom | 9,776 | |
| MV Talabot | 1936 | Norway | 6,798 | |
Group 2
| MV Amerika | 1930 | Denmark | 10,218 | |
| MV Thermopylæ | 1930 | Norway | 6,655 | |
Group 3
| MV Hoegh Hood | 1936 | Norway | 9,351 | 24 July, torpedo bomber hit |
| SS Settler | 1939 | Merchant Navy | 6,202 | |
| MV Svenor | 1931 | Norway | 7,616 | Tanker |

=== Convoy escorts ===
Operation Substance escort forces
| Ship | Flag | Type | Notes |
Force H
| HMS Renown | Royal Navy | Renown-class battlecruiser | |
| HMS Nelson | Royal Navy | Nelson-class battleship | |
| HMS Ark Royal | Royal Navy | Aircraft carrier | |
| HMS Hermione | Royal Navy | Dido-class cruiser | |
| HMS Duncan | Royal Navy | D-class destroyer | |
| HMS Faulknor | Royal Navy | F-class destroyer | |
| HMS Foresight | Royal Navy | F-class destroyer | |
| HMS Forester | Royal Navy | F-class destroyer | |
| HMS Fury | Royal Navy | F-class destroyer | |
| HMS Lightning | Royal Navy | L-class destroyer | |
Force X
| HMS Edinburgh | Royal Navy | Town-class cruiser | |
| HMS Manchester | Royal Navy | Town-class cruiser | Hit by torpedo bomber, 23 July |
| HMS Arethusa | Royal Navy | Arethusa-class cruiser | |
| HMS Manxman | Royal Navy | Abdiel-class minelayer | |
| HMS Cossack | Royal Navy | Tribal-class destroyer | |
| HMS Maori | Royal Navy | Tribal-class destroyer | |
| HMS Sikh | Royal Navy | Tribal-class destroyer | |
| HMS Fearless | Royal Navy | F-class destroyer | Hit by torpedo bomber, scuttled, 23 July |
| HMS Foxhound | Royal Navy | F-class destroyer | |
| HMS Firedrake | Royal Navy | F-class destroyer | Near missed, damaged, 23 July |
| HMAS Nestor | Royal Australian Navy | N-class destroyer | |
| HMS Farndale | Royal Navy | Hunt-class destroyer | |
| HMS Avon Vale | Royal Navy | Hunt-class destroyer | |
| HMS Eridge | Royal Navy | Hunt-class destroyer | |
Force S
| RFA Brown Ranger | United Kingdom | Ranger class tanker | |
| HMS Beverley | Royal Navy | Clemson-class destroyer | |
Submarines
| HNLMS O 21 | Royal Navy | O 21-class submarine | |
| HMS Olympus | Royal Navy | Odin-class submarine | |
| HMS P32 | Royal Navy | British U-class submarine | |
| HMS Unique | Royal Navy | British U-class submarine | |
| HMS Upholder | Royal Navy | British U-class submarine | |
| HMS Upright | Royal Navy | British U-class submarine | |
| HMS Urge | Royal Navy | British U-class submarine | |
| HMS Utmost | Royal Navy | British U-class submarine | |
Escort for Convoy MG 1
| HMS Encounter | Royal Navy | E-class destroyer | |

=== Fleet Air Arm−Royal Air Force ===
Fighter squadrons
| NAS | Flag | Type | Notes |
Fleet Air Arm
| 807 Naval Air Squadron | Royal Navy | Fulmar Mk II | 12 aircraft |
| 808 Naval Air Squadron | Royal Navy | Fulmar Mk II | 12 aircraft |
Royal Air Force
| 272 Squadron | Royal Air Force | Beaufighter IC | 1 aircraft lost |

== Italian order of battle ==
=== Regia Aeronautica ===
Anti-shipping and fighter units
| Unit | Flag | Base | Sqe | Type | Role | Notes |
Aeronautica della Sardegna
| 32° Stormo BT | Kingdom of Italy | Decimomannu | 49a, 50a, 228a 229a | S.79 | Medium bomber | |
| 51° Gruppo BT | Kingdom of Italy | Villacidro | — | Z.1007 | Medium bomber | |
| 130° Gruppo TB | Kingdom of Italy | Decimomannu | 283a | S.79sil | Torpedo bomber | |
Aeronautica della Sicilia
| 23° Gruppo CT | Kingdom of Italy | Comiso | 70a, 74a, 75a | CR.42 | Fighter | |
| 10a Stormo BT | Kingdom of Italy | — | 278a | S.79 | Medium bomber | |
| 30a Stormo BT | Kingdom of Italy | — | 192a, 193a, 194a, 195a | S.79 | Medium bomber | |
| 54° Stormo CT | Kingdom of Italy | — | 16° Gruppo | C.200 | Fighter | |
| 101 Gruppo BaT | Kingdom of Italy | Trapani | 208a, 238a | Ju 87 | Dive bomber | |

=== Luftwaffe ===
Fliegerkorps X (5 April 1941)
| Unit | Flag | Base | Type | Role | No. | Notes |
|---|---|---|---|---|---|---|
| 1. (F)/121 | Luftwaffe | Catania | Junkers Ju 88 D-1 | Medium bomber | 14 | 6 serviceable |
| 2. (F)/123 | Luftwaffe | Catania | Junkers Ju 88 D-1 | Medium bomber | 14 | 4 serviceable |
| 7./JG 26 | Luftwaffe | Sicily | Messerschmitt Bf 109 E-7 | Fighter | 14 | 10 serviceable |
| I./NJG 3 | Luftwaffe | Gela | Messerschmitt Bf 110 E-3 | Night fighter | 7 | 4 serviceable |
| III./ZG 26 | Luftwaffe | Sicily–N. Africa | Messerschmitt Bf 110 D-3 | Heavy fighter | 48 | 40 serviceable |
| II./LG 1 | Luftwaffe | Catania | Junkers Ju 88 A-4 | Medium bomber | 30 | 17 serviceable |
| III./LG 1 | Luftwaffe | Catania | Junkers Ju 88 A-4 | Medium bomber | 36 | 19 serviceable |
| 2./KG 4 | Luftwaffe | Comiso | Heinkel He 111 H-3 | Medium bomber | 12 | 7 serviceable |
| II./KG 26 | Luftwaffe | Comiso | Heinkel He 111 H-3 | Medium bomber | 36 | 20 serviceable |
| III./KG 30 | Luftwaffe | Sicily | Junkers Ju 88 A-4/T | Medium bomber | 26 | 20 serviceable |
| Stab/StG 1 | Luftwaffe | N. Africa | Junkers Ju 87 B-1 | Dive bomber | 12 | 10 serviceable |
| II./StG 1 | Luftwaffe | Sicily | Junkers Ju 87 B-1 | Dive bomber | 36 | 16 serviceable |
| III./StG 1 | Luftwaffe | N. Africa | Junkers Ju 87 B-1 | Dive bomber | 39 | 29 serviceable |
| II./StG 2 | Luftwaffe | N. Africa | Junkers Ju 87 B-1 | Dive bomber | 33 | 23 serviceable |
| III./KG zbV 1 | Luftwaffe | Sicily | Junkers Ju 52/3m | Transport | 47 | 31 serviceable |
| KGr zbV 9 | Luftwaffe | Sicily | Junkers Ju 52/3m | Transport | 28 | 28 serviceable |

== See also ==
- Battle of the Mediterranean
- Malta Convoys
