= 10th Submarine Flotilla =

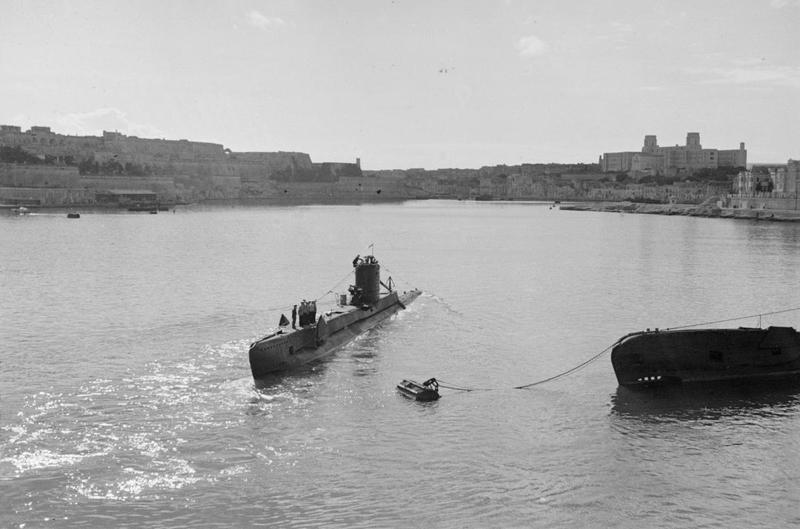
- HMS Una one of the 10th Submarine Flotilla boats
- Active: 1915 — 1918; January 1941 — March 1943
- Country: United Kingdom
- Branch: Royal Navy
- Role: Submarine
- Size: Flotilla
- Garrison/HQ: HMS Talbot, Manoel Island, Malta
- Nickname: "The Fighting 10th"
- Engagements: Battle of the Mediterranean

Commanders
- Notable commanders: Captain George Walter Gillow Simpson RN

The 10th Submarine Flotilla was a Royal Navy submarine formation during World War I and during World War II

In January 1915 it was based on the Humber but by January 1917 it had relocated to the Tees.

During the Second World War it was formed at Malta in January 1941 and comprised Royal Navy and Polish Naval Force submarines assigned to the British Mediterranean Fleet based in Malta from early 1941.

== Second World War ==
The flotilla was initially composed of the U-class submarines including HMS Unbeaten, HMS Upholder, HMS United, HMS Upright, HMS Una, HMS Unseen, HMS Unbending, HMS Unbroken, HMS Urge, HMS Utmost, HMS P38 and HMS Ursula (N59) together with ORP Sokół and ORP Dzik of the Polish Navy

The U-class had been designed for training crews rather than combat but their diving performance made them the best choice for operating in the clear waters of the Mediterranean where submarines could be easily seen by aircraft.

The flotilla's base in Malta was the ancient fort on Manoel Island, in the Marsamxett Harbour opposite Sliema; this shore base was called HMS Talbot. The Lazzaretto of Manoel Island formed part of the quarters for the crews

The submarine base at Manoel Island was a priority target for Axis aerial attacks and was heavily bombed in 1942 which forced a temporary withdrawal of the flotilla from Malta to Alexandria where the ships of the Mediterranean Fleet had already moved. During this relocation to Alexandria HMS Urge sank after striking a mine; there were no survivors.

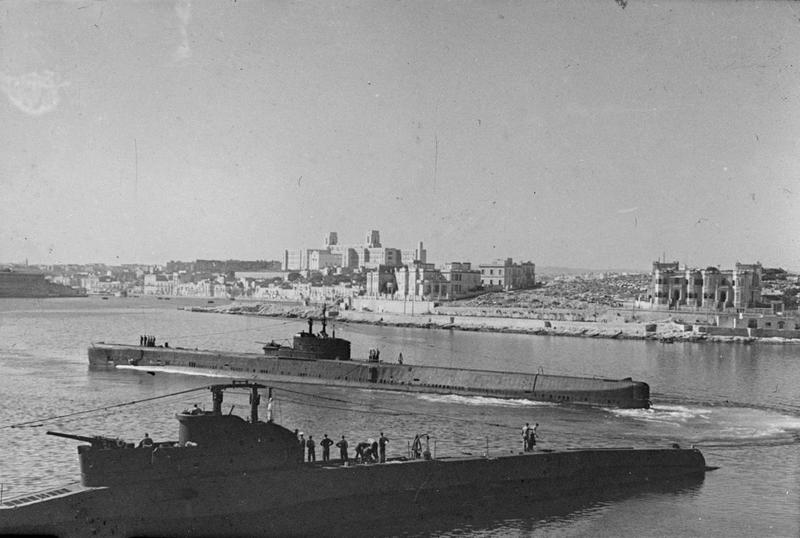
HMS Rorqual and Thunderbolt mooring up at Malta's submarine base in 1943

The flotilla never numbered more than 12 submarines, but this small force between January 1941 and December 1942, sank 412,575 tons of Axis shipping.

On 24 May 1941 while assigned to the flotilla HMS Upholder attacked a convoy off the coast of Sicily and sank the 18,000 ton liner Conte Rosso. Upholder's captain, Lieutenant Commander Malcolm Wanklyn, was awarded the Victoria Cross for both this and also for completing many successful patrols.

== See also ==
- Mediterranean and Middle East theatre of World War II
- Siege of Malta (World War II)
- 14th/17th Minesweeper Flotilla
- Malta Convoys
