= HMS P33 (1941) =

Submarine of the Royal Navy

History

United Kingdom
- Builder: Vickers-Armstrongs, Barrow-in-Furness
- Laid down: 18 June 1940
- Launched: 28 January 1941
- Commissioned: 30 May 1941
- Fate: Missing after 6 August 1941

General characteristics
- Displacement: Surfaced - 540 tons standard, 630 tons full load; Submerged - 730 tons
- Length: 58.22 m (191 ft)
- Beam: 4.90 m (16 ft 1 in)
- Draught: 4.62 m (15 ft 2 in)
- Propulsion: 2 shaft diesel-electric; 2 Paxman Ricardo diesel generators + electric motors; 615 / 825 hp
- Speed: 11.25 knots (20.8 km/h) max surfaced; 10 knots (19 km/h) max submerged
- Complement: 33
- Armament: 4 bow internal 21 inch (533 mm) torpedo tubes - 8 - 10 torpedoes; 1 - 3-inch (76 mm) gun

HMS P33 was a Royal Navy U-class submarine built by Vickers-Armstrongs at Barrow-in-Furness.

Commanded throughout her entire career by Lieutenant R.D. Whiteway-Wilkinson, the submarine was attached to the 10th Submarine Flotilla based at Malta. On 15 July 1941, the submarine sunk the 5,300 ton motor-vessel Barbarigo south of Punta Sciaccazza, Pantelleria, part of a small Italian convoy.

The submarine departed on her final patrol on 6 August 1941 from Malta to patrol off Sicily to intercept an Italian convoy heading towards Libya. Her sister boat P32, which was attacking the same convoy along with HMS Unique, reported hearing a prolonged depth charge attack on 18 August and subsequently attempted unsuccessfully to contact P33. P32 was herself sunk later that day. P33 became overdue on 20 August and was almost certain to have been sunk in this attack. It is, however, possible that she was sunk by the Italian torpedo boat Partenope near Pantelleria on 23 August. Lost aboard P33 was Lieutenant Richard Cunningham, the son of Vice Admiral John Cunningham, who would later become First Sea Lord.
