= P62 =

P62 may refer to:

== Naval vessels ==
- HMS Uther (P62), a submarine of the Royal Navy
- INS Kirch (P62), a corvette of the Indian Navy
- LÉ James Joyce (P62), an offshore patrol vessel of the Irish Naval Service
- P-62 Explorer, a fictional icebreaker in the 2019 Indian film War

== Other uses ==
- Curtiss XP-62, an American prototype interceptor aircraft
- Nucleoporin 62, a protein complex associated with the nuclear envelope
- Papyrus 62, a biblical manuscript
- Sequestosome 1, ubiquitin-binding protein p62
- P62, a state regional road in Latvia
- P6_{2}, three-dimensional space group number 171
