= Varangian (disambiguation) =

Varangian may refer to one of these:

- Varangians, the term for Norse Vikings who were active in Eastern Europe
- Member of the Varangian Guard
- Russian term for Catholics in the 12th and 13th century
- Russian term for Scandinavians until the second half of the 12th century
- Russian name of the Baltic Sea up to the 18th century
- The Varangian Way, the second full-length album from Viking metallers Turisas
- Related to the Varanger Peninsula, Norway
- Sturtian-Varangian, a glacial episode approximately 700 million years ago, named after Varanger
- HMS Varangian, a Royal Navy submarine, built in 1943
