= HMS Undine (N48) =

Submarine of the Royal Navy

Coordinates: 54°5′53″N 7°24′17″E

- HMS Undine

History

United Kingdom
- Name: HMS Undine
- Builder: Vickers Armstrong, Barrow-in-Furness
- Laid down: 19 February 1937
- Launched: 5 October 1937
- Commissioned: 21 August 1938
- Fate: Scuttled 7 January 1940
- Badge

General characteristics
- Class & type: U-class submarine
- Displacement: Surfaced – 540 tons standard, 630 tons full load; Submerged – 730 tons
- Length: 58.22 m (191 ft 0 in)
- Beam: 4.90 m (16 ft 1 in)
- Draught: 4.62 m (15 ft 2 in)
- Installed power: 615 hp (459 kW) / 825 hp (615 kW)
- Propulsion: 2 shaft diesel-electric; 2 Paxman Ricardo diesel generators + electric motors
- Speed: 11.25 kn (20.84 km/h; 12.95 mph) max surfaced; 10 kn (19 km/h; 12 mph) max submerged
- Complement: 27
- Armament: 4 bow internal 21 inch (533 mm) torpedo tubes, 2 external; 10 torpedoes; 3 anti-aircraft machine guns

HMS Undine was a U-class submarine and lead vessel of her class, which is sometimes called the Undine class as a result. The submarine entered service in 1938. Undine performed war patrols during the Second World War and was scuttled after being damaged by German minesweepers off Heligoland on 7 January 1940.

== Construction and career ==
Undine was built by Vickers Armstrong, Barrow-in-Furness. She was laid down on 19 February 1937 and was commissioned on 21 August 1938 with the pennant number N48.

At the onset of the Second World War, Undine was a member of the 6th Submarine Flotilla. From 26–29 August 1939, the flotilla deployed to its war bases at Dundee and Blyth.

=== Sinking ===
Undine was on her fourth war patrol in January 1940 when her sonar failed due to a leak. At 0940 on 7 January, she was attacked by German auxiliary minesweepers M-1201, M-1204 and M-1207. She unsuccessfully attacked the leading vessel, but the minesweepers counter attacked and forced her to dive. Undine was at 50 feet (15 m) and proceeding blind due to the loss of sonar. After five minutes with no further attacks, she raised her periscope and was heavily damaged by an explosion. The order to abandon ship was given. The crew scuttled the Undine while abandoning ship.
