= HMS P32 (1940) =

Submarine of the Royal Navy

Coordinates: 33°2′N 13°10′E

History

United Kingdom
- Builder: Vickers-Armstrongs, Barrow-in-Furness
- Laid down: 30 April 1940
- Launched: 15 December 1940
- Commissioned: 3 May 1941
- Fate: Struck a mine, 18 August 1941

General characteristics
- Displacement: Surfaced - 540 tons standard, 630 tons full load; Submerged - 730 tons
- Length: 58.22 m (191 ft)
- Beam: 4.90 m (16 ft 1 in)
- Draught: 4.62 m (15 ft 2 in)
- Propulsion: 2 shaft diesel-electric; 2 Paxman Ricardo diesel generators + electric motors; 615 / 825 hp
- Speed: 11.25 knots (20.8 km/h) surfaced; 10 knots (19 km/h) submerged
- Complement: 32
- Armament: Four bow internal 21 inch (533 mm) torpedo tubes; 8 - 10 torpedoes; One - 3-inch (76 mm) gun

HMS P32 was a Royal Navy U-class submarine built by Vickers-Armstrongs at Barrow-in-Furness.

The submarine left Malta on 12 August 1941 for a patrol area near Tripoli. Six days later, she sighted a small Italian convoy of five merchant ships protected by destroyers and torpedo boats heading towards the port. P32 and two other U-class submarines attempted to attack the convoy. HMS P33 was almost certainly sunk in the attempt, whilst HMS Unique managed to sink an Italian merchant ship, SS Esperia two days later.

P32 was not in a good position to make an attack, and so attempted to improve it by running underneath a moored minefield. Believing that she had cleared the minefield, the commanding officer, Lieutenant D.A.B. Abdy ordered the submarine to rise to periscope depth to resume the attack. Evidence shows that an internal explosion flooded the portion of the boat forward of the control room, killing the eight crew members in that part of the vessel. The submarine developed a severe list and sank to the seabed.

Most of the 24 survivors retired to the engine room to attempt a DSEA escape. However Abdy, the coxswain Petty Officer Kirk, and ERA Martin attempted to escape using the conning tower. Martin was killed in the attempt but the other two men survived and were picked up by the Italian motor torpedo boat MAS 528. No other crew members survived. Abdy and Kirk were exchanged for Italian prisoners of war in 1943. The wreck was discovered in 1999; it lies about 15 nautical miles (28 km; 17 mi) east-north-east of Tripoli, at a depth of about 200 feet (61 m).
