= HMS Unswerving =

Submarine of the Royal Navy

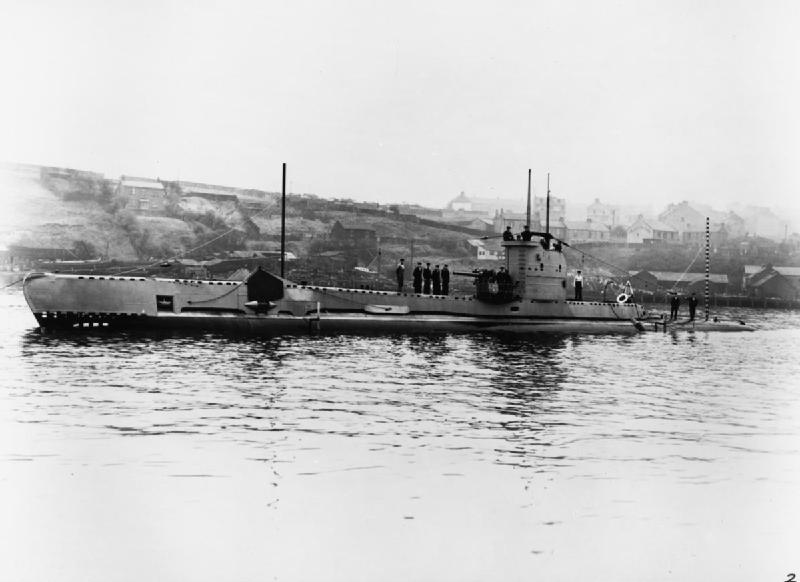
- HMS Unswerving, circa 1944

History

United Kingdom
- Name: HMS Unswerving
- Builder: Vickers-Armstrongs, High Walker
- Laid down: 17 February 1942
- Launched: 19 July 1943
- Commissioned: 3 October 1943
- Fate: Sold for scrap, July 1949
- Badge

General characteristics
- Class & type: U-class submarine
- Displacement: Surfaced - 540 tons standard, 630 tons full load; Submerged - 730 tons
- Length: 58.22 m (191 feet)
- Beam: 4.90 m (16 ft 1 in)
- Draught: 4.62 m (15 ft 2 in)
- Propulsion: 2 shaft diesel-electric; 2 Paxman Ricardo diesel generators + electric motors; 615 / 825 hp
- Speed: 11.25 knots max surfaced; 10 knots max submerged
- Complement: 27-31
- Armament: 4 bow internal 21 inch (533 mm) torpedo tubes - 8 - 10 torpedoes; 1 - 3-inch (76 mm) gun

HMS Unswerving (P63) was a Royal Navy U-class submarine built by Vickers-Armstrongs, High Walker. So far, she has been the only ship of the Royal Navy to bear the name Unswerving.

== Career ==
Unswerving carried out work-ups at end of 1943, then joined the 1st Flotilla in the Mediterranean, where she carried out patrols in the Aegean Sea. She eventually spent most of her wartime career in the Mediterranean, where she sank the German guard boats GN 61 and GN 62, the German tanker Bertha (the former French Bacchus) and six sailing vessels, and claimed to have damaged a seventh. She was however unlucky on numerous occasions, unsuccessfully attacking the small German merchant Toni (the former Greek Thalia), the German auxiliary minelayer Zeus, the German transport Pelikan and her escort, the German torpedo boat TA19, and the German merchant Gertrud on two separate occasions.

Under the command of Lieutenant M. D. "Mick" Tattershall, Unswerving was the first British submarine where all the officers were members of the Royal Naval Volunteer Reserve rather than any of them being officers of the regular navy.

Unswerving survived the war and arrived at John Cashmore Ltd, Newport on 10 July 1949 for scrapping.
