= HMS Vandal =

Submarine of the Royal Navy

Coordinates: 55°43′N 5°20′W

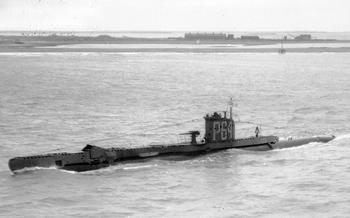
- HMS Vandal

History

United Kingdom
- Ordered: 15 July 1941
- Builder: Vickers-Armstrongs, Barrow-in-Furness
- Laid down: 17 March 1942
- Launched: 23 November 1942
- Commissioned: 20 February 1943
- Fate: Sunk in an accident on 24 February 1943, Firth of Clyde
- Badge

General characteristics
- Class & type: U-class submarine
- Displacement: Surfaced - 540 tons standard, 630 tons full load; Submerged - 730 tons
- Length: 58.22 m (191 ft 0 in)
- Beam: 4.90 m (16 ft 1 in)
- Draught: 4.62 m (15 ft 2 in)
- Propulsion: 2 shaft diesel-electric; 2 Paxman Ricardo diesel generators + electric motors; 615 / 825 hp
- Speed: 11.25 kn (20.84 km/h; 12.95 mph) max surfaced; 10 kn (19 km/h; 12 mph) max submerged
- Complement: 27-31
- Armament: 4 x bow internal 21 inch (533 mm) torpedo tubes - 8 - 10 torpedoes; 1 x 3-inch (76 mm) gun

HMS Vandal (P64) was a Royal Navy U-class submarine built by Vickers-Armstrongs at Barrow-in-Furness, yard number 838. The submarine had the shortest career of any Royal Navy submarine, being lost with all 37 onboard just four days after commissioning.

== Loss ==
The submarine, under the command of Lieutenant James S. Bridger, was lost whilst carrying out a three-day-long working up exercise following commissioning. The submarine was last seen leaving her anchorage on 24 February 1943 at Lochranza, in the North of the Isle of Arran, Firth of Clyde, before her rediscovery in December 1994. She had only just joined the Third Submarine Flotilla in Holy Loch, a major submarine base during the Second World War used extensively for trials and exercises.

There were initially conflicting reports over the possible position of the lost submarine, one submarine reported seeing a smoke candle two and a half miles (5 km) north of Inchmarnock, and another reported hearing hull tapping in a similar area. However a spotter plane reported a large oil slick about 2 miles (4 km) north of Arran (15 kilometres from Inchmarnock). An inquiry at the time of her loss ignored the report from the spotter plane and concluded that the submarine had sunk during the deep dive she was scheduled to perform on that day, somewhere north of Inchmarnock.

At the time Prime Minister Winston Churchill demanded a full report on the loss of the Vandal and asked if the submarine had been recovered. The reply from Flag Officer Submarines repeated the mistaken assumption that the Vandal lay in deep waters off Inchmarnock, where salvage would be impossible.

In 1994 the Scottish Branch of the Submariners Association finally persuaded the Navy to search the area north of Arran where a number of trawlers had reported their nets being snagged by an underwater object. A Royal Navy expedition aboard HMS Hurworth finally located the wreck in June 1994, 300 feet (100 m) below the surface 1.5 miles (3 km) northwest of Lochranza, roughly where the spotter plane had first reported the presence of an oil slick. The wreck lies in pitch darkness on a muddy slope 100 metres down with a 35 degree list to port. Her 12-pounder forward gun remains covered with a trawler's net, and the brass letters VANDAL are clearly visible.

There was only one survivor of Vandal's crew, Larry Gaines. At the time Gaines was too ill with earache to sail with the ship, and was replaced by a younger, less experienced crew member. For 60 years Gaines had blamed himself for the loss, as he believed his replacement had not secured the aft engine room hatch, one of Gaines' final checks before diving. Subsequent dives on the wreck revealed that the aft engine room hatch was closed, and this could not have been the cause of the sinking. Prior to this investigation, it was generally considered that human error in leaving a hatch open as the submarine dived had caused the loss. It was later proved that the submarine was on the surface and not diving when the accident occurred.

The ship was originally named HMS Unbridled. Before taking command of what was to be his first and last boat, skipper James Bridger assembled his crew on the jetty at Barrow, to inform them that she would henceforth be officially known as Vandal. This went against a long-held maritime tradition that to change the name of a ship risks bringing bad luck upon it and the crew.

== Tributes ==
A memorial to those lost aboard HMS Vandal was erected beside the Caledonian MacBrayne ferry terminal at Lochranza Pier, Isle of Arran, by HM Submarines Old Comrades Association in 1997.

The wreck was one of those designated under the Protection of Military Remains Act 1986, which prohibits interference with the site by divers.
