= HMS Usurper =

Royal Navy U-class submarine

History

United Kingdom
- Name: HMS Usurper
- Builder: Vickers-Armstrongs, High Walker
- Laid down: 18 September 1941
- Launched: 24 September 1942
- Commissioned: 2 February 1943
- Fate: Sunk 3 October 1943

General characteristics
- Class & type: U-class submarine
- Displacement: Surfaced – 540 tons standard, 630 tons full load; Submerged – 730 tons
- Length: 58.22 m (191 feet)
- Beam: 4.90 m (16 ft 1 in)
- Draught: 4.62 m (15 ft 2 in)
- Propulsion: 2 shaft diesel-electric; 2 Paxman Ricardo diesel generators + electric motors; 615 / 825 hp
- Speed: 11.25 knots max surfaced; 10 knots max submerged
- Complement: 27–31
- Armament: 4 bow internal 21 inch (533 mm) torpedo tubes – 8–10 torpedoes; 1 3-inch (76 mm) gun

HMS Usurper (P56) was a Royal Navy U-class submarine built by Vickers-Armstrongs at High Walker. So far, she has been the only ship of the Royal Navy to bear the name Usurper.

== Career ==
Usurper had a short-lived career with the Royal Navy. During her work-up patrol off the Norwegian coast, she made a torpedo attack on the German submarine U-467. The target was not hit. On being assigned to operate in the Mediterranean, she sank the French ship Château Yquem.

== Sinking ==
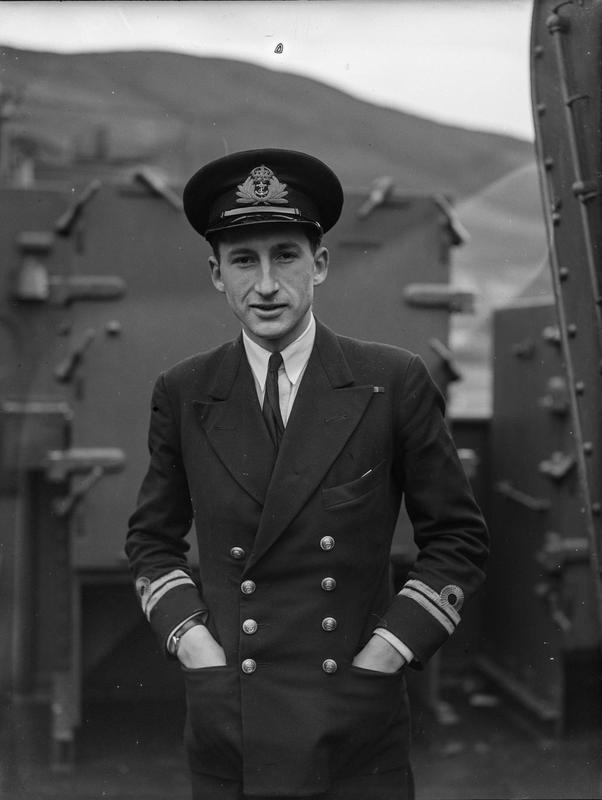
Lt D. R. O. Mott DSC RN, Commanding Officer of HMS Usurper, Holy Loch, 6 February 1943 (IWM A14396)

Usurper had left Algiers on 24 September 1943 to patrol off La Spezia. On 3 October 1943 she was ordered to move to the Gulf of Genoa, after which there was no further contact. She was overdue at Algiers on 12 October 1943. The German anti-submarine vessel UJ-2208/Alfred reported attacking a submarine in the Gulf of Genoa on 3 October 1943 and it is believed that this may have been Usurper. During the war, Usurper was adopted by the town of Stroud as part of Warship Week. The plaque from this adoption is held by the National Museum of the Royal Navy in Portsmouth.
