= HMS Unity (N66) =

Submarine of the Royal Navy

Coordinates: 55°13′N 1°19′W

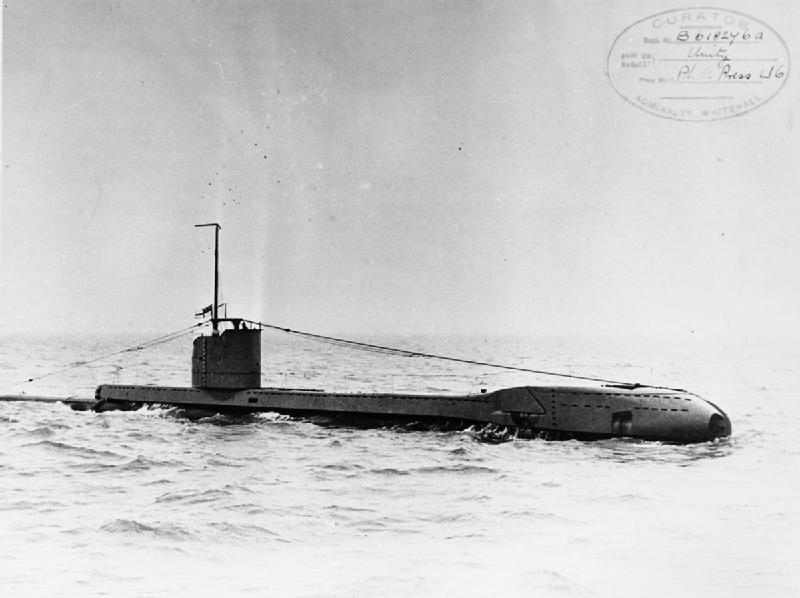
- HMS Unity

History

United Kingdom
- Name: HMS Unity
- Builder: Vickers Armstrong, Barrow-in-Furness
- Laid down: 19 February 1937
- Launched: 16 February 1938
- Commissioned: 5 October 1938
- Fate: Sunk 29 April 1940 in accidental collision
- Badge

General characteristics
- Class & type: U-class submarine
- Displacement: Surfaced – 540 tons standard, 630 tons full load; Submerged – 730 tons
- Length: 58.22 m (191 ft 0 in)
- Beam: 4.90 m (16 ft 1 in)
- Draught: 4.62 m (15 ft 2 in)
- Propulsion: 2 shaft diesel-electric; 2 Paxman Ricardo diesel generators + electric motors; 615 hp (459 kW) / 825 hp (615 kW)
- Speed: 11.25 kn (20.84 km/h; 12.95 mph) max surfaced; 10 kn (19 km/h; 12 mph) max submerged
- Complement: 27
- Armament: 4 bow internal 21 inch (533 mm) torpedo tubes, 2 external; 10 torpedoes; 3 anti-aircraft machine guns

HMS Unity was a U-class submarine, of the first group of that class constructed for the Royal Navy. The submarine entered service in 1938 and performed war patrols during the Second World War. On 29 April 1940, Unity was accidentally rammed and sunk in Blyth, Northumberland's harbour.

== Construction and career ==
Unity was built by Vickers Armstrong, Barrow-in-Furness. She was laid down on 19 February 1937 and was commissioned on 5 October 1938.

At the onset of the Second World War, Unity was a member of the 6th Submarine Flotilla. From 26–29 August 1939, the flotilla deployed to its war bases at Dundee and Blyth. She served in home waters in the North Sea, making a failed attack on the German submarine U-2.

She rescued the survivors of Dutch fishing vessel Protinus on 25 March 1940.

On the 11th of April 1940, at AN3446, Unity was spotted by U-5, a German Type IIa coastal submarine commanded by Kapitänleutnant Lehmann. U-5 fired a G7a (T1) steam powered torpedo at the Unity, which subsequently saw the bubble trail and proceeded to crash dive in heavy seas. U-5 followed suit in an attempt at an underwater shot with a G7e (T2) electric torpedo. However contact was lost and Unity managed to escape unharmed.

== Sinking ==
Unity sailed from Blyth on 29 April 1940 to patrol off Norway, where she collided with the Norwegian ship Atle Jarl, sinking five minutes later. Two members of her crew, Lieutenant John Low and able Seaman Henry Miller, gave their lives by remaining behind in the flooded control room so that their shipmates could escape from the sinking vessel.

== Wreck ==
The wreck is accessible by technical divers, lying at a depth between 48 and 55 metres (157 and 180 ft) off the Farne Islands.

== Sources ==
- Colledge, J. J.; Warlow, Ben (2006) [1969]. Ships of the Royal Navy: The Complete Record of All Fighting Ships of the Royal Navy from the 15th Century to the Present (3rd Rev ed.). London: Chatham Publishing. ISBN 978-1-86176-281-8. OCLC 67375475.
- Gray, Edwyn (1996). Few Survived A Comprehensive Survey of Submarine Accidents and Disasters. London: Leo Cooper. ISBN 978-0850524994.
- Hutchinson, Robert (2001). Jane's Submarines: War Beneath the Waves from 1776 to the Present Day. London: HarperCollins. ISBN 978-0-00-710558-8. OCLC 53783010.
- Rohwer, Jürgen (2005). Chronology of the War at Sea 1939–1945: The Naval History of World War Two (Revised & Expanded ed.). Annapolis, Maryland: Naval Institute Press. ISBN 1-59114-119-2.
