= HMS Usk (N65) =

British U class submarine

- HMS Usk (N65)

History

United Kingdom
- Name: HMS Usk
- Builder: Vickers-Armstrongs, Barrow-in-Furness
- Laid down: 6 November 1939
- Launched: 7 June 1940
- Commissioned: 11 October 1940
- Fate: Sunk 29 April 1941
- Badge

General characteristics
- Displacement: Surfaced - 540 tons standard, 630 tons full load; Submerged - 730 tons
- Length: 58.22 m (191 feet)
- Beam: 4.90 m (16 ft 1 in)
- Draught: 4.62 m (15 ft 2 in)
- Propulsion: 2 shaft diesel-electric; 2 Paxman Ricardo diesel generators + electric motors; 615 / 825 hp
- Speed: 11.25 knots max surfaced; 10 knots max submerged
- Complement: 27-31
- Armament: 4 bow internal 21 inch (533 mm) torpedo tubes, 2 external; 10 torpedoes; 1 - 3-inch (76 mm) gun

HMS Usk was a British U class submarine, of the second group of that class, built by Vickers-Armstrongs, Barrow-in-Furness. She was laid down on 6 November 1939 and was commissioned on 11 October 1940.

== Career and loss ==
Usk spent most of her short career operating in the Mediterranean. She sailed from Malta to patrol off the north west coast of Sicily on 19 April 1941. Usk was later ordered to alter her position due to intense anti-submarine activity. Subsequent events are unknown, but she most likely struck mines in the vicinity of Cape Bon some time after 25 April 1941. She was reported overdue on 3 May 1941.
