= HMS Union (N56) =

Submarine of the Royal Navy

Coordinates: 36°27′23″N 11°42′21″E

History

United Kingdom
- Name: HMS Union
- Builder: Vickers-Armstrongs, Barrow-in-Furness
- Laid down: 9 December 1939
- Launched: 1 October 1940
- Commissioned: 22 February 1941
- Fate: Sunk 20 July 1941

General characteristics
- Displacement: 960 long tons (980 t) surfaced; 1,150 long tons (1,170 t) submerged
- Length: 192 ft (58.5 m)
- Beam: 16 ft (4.9 m)
- Draught: 15 ft 9 in (4.8 m)
- Installed power: 615 bhp (459 kW) (diesel); 825 hp (615 kW) (electric)
- Propulsion: 2 × diesel engines; 2 × electric motors
- Speed: 11.25 kn (20.84 km/h; 12.95 mph) surfaced; 9 kn (17 km/h; 10 mph) submerged
- Range: 4,050 nmi (7,500 km; 4,660 mi) at 10 kn (19 km/h; 12 mph) on the surface
- Test depth: 200 feet (61.0 m)
- Complement: 33
- Armament: 4 × bow 21 in (533 mm) torpedo tubes; 1 × 12-pdr deck gun

HMS Union was a British U class submarine, of the second group of that class, built by Vickers-Armstrongs, Barrow-in-Furness. She was laid down on 9 December 1939 and was commissioned on 22 February 1941.

== Career and sinking ==
Union spent much of her short career operating in the Mediterranean, where she sank the Italian merchant Pietro Querini. However, her success was short-lived. Union sailed from Malta at 1 o’clock on the morning of 14 July 1941 with orders to intercept a convoy north of Tripoli the following day. On 20 July 1941 she was depth charged by the Italian torpedo boat Circe, and sank with all hands during the attack on the convoy south of Pantelleria. When Union failed to return to Malta she was reported overdue on 22 July 1941.
