= HMS Uther =

Submarine of the Royal Navy

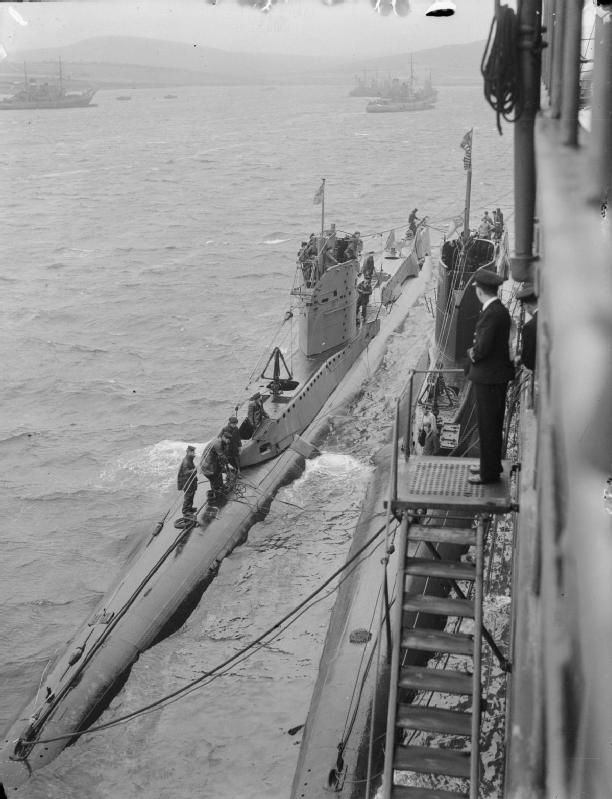
- HM Submarines Uther and Unbroken coming alongside their depot ship at Scapa Flow after a successful patrol

History

United Kingdom
- Name: HMS Uther
- Builder: Vickers-Armstrongs, Newcastle upon Tyne
- Laid down: 31 January 1942
- Launched: 6 April 1943
- Commissioned: 15 August 1943
- Fate: Scrapped April 1950
- Badge

General characteristics
- Class & type: U-class submarine
- Displacement: Surfaced – 540 tons standard, 630 tons full load; Submerged – 730 tons
- Length: 58.22 m (191 feet)
- Beam: 4.90 m (16 ft 1 in)
- Draught: 4.62 m (15 ft 2 in)
- Propulsion: 2 shaft diesel-electric; 2 Paxman Ricardo diesel generators + electric motors; 615 / 825 hp
- Speed: 11.25 knots max surfaced; 10 knots max submerged
- Complement: 27–31
- Armament: 4 bow internal 21 inch (533 mm) torpedo tubes – 8 – 10 torpedoes; 1 – 3-inch (76 mm) gun

HMS Uther (P62) was a Royal Navy U-class submarine built by Vickers-Armstrongs. So far she has been the only ship of the Royal Navy to bear the name Uther after the father of King Arthur, Uther Pendragon.

== Career ==
Uther had a relatively quiet wartime career, serving on a number of uneventful patrols. She continued in service for another five years and was eventually sold for scrapping in February 1950, and broken up at Hayle in April 1950.
