= HMS Varangian =

Submarine of the Royal Navy

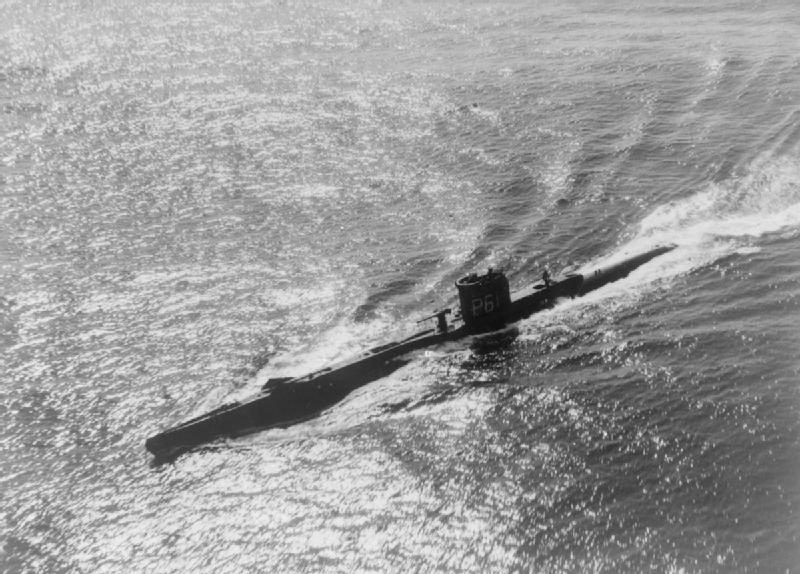
- HMS Varangian

History

United Kingdom
- Name: HMS Varangian
- Builder: Vickers-Armstrongs, High Walker
- Laid down: 23 December 1941
- Launched: 4 April 1943
- Commissioned: 10 July 1943
- Fate: Scrapped, 1 June 1949, Gateshead
- Badge

General characteristics
- Displacement: Surfaced – 540 tons standard, 630 tons full load; Submerged – 740 tons
- Length: 60 m (196 ft 10 in)
- Beam: 4.90 m (16 ft 1 in)
- Draught: 4.62 m (15 ft 2 in)
- Propulsion: 2 shaft diesel-electric; 2 Paxman Ricardo diesel generators + electric motors; 615 / 825 hp
- Speed: 11.25 knots (21 km/h) max surfaced; 9 knots (17 km/h) max submerged
- Complement: 33
- Armament: 4 bow internal, 2 bow external 21 inch (533 mm) torpedo tubes: 8 – 10 torpedoes; 1 × 3-inch (76 mm) gun; 3 × AA machine guns

HMS Varangian was a British built U class submarine, a member of the third group of that class to be built. The submarine carried out patrols in the Norwegian Sea and was also used in a training role. She was broken up at Gateshead in 1949. Her ship's bell (inscribed "HMS Varangian 1943") is in the possession of the Royal Navy Submarine Museum in Gosport, United Kingdom.
