= HMS P38 (1941) =

Submarine of the Royal Navy

Coordinates: 32°48′0″N 14°58′0″E

- HMS P38

History

United Kingdom
- Name: P38
- Builder: Vickers-Armstrongs, Barrow-in-Furness
- Laid down: 2 September 1940
- Launched: 9 July 1941
- Commissioned: 17 October 1941
- Home port: Malta
- Fate: Sunk 23 February 1942

General characteristics
- Class & type: U-class submarine
- Displacement: Surfaced - 540 tons standard, 630 tons full load; Submerged - 730 tons
- Length: 58.22 m (191 ft 0 in)
- Beam: 4.90 m (16 ft 1 in)
- Draught: 4.62 m (15 ft 2 in)
- Propulsion: Two shaft diesel-electric; Two Paxman Ricardo diesel generators + electric motors; 615 / 825 hp
- Speed: 11.25 knots (20.84 km/h; 12.95 mph) surfaced; 10 knots (19 km/h; 12 mph) submerged
- Complement: 27-31
- Armament: 4 × bow internal 21-inch (533 mm) torpedo tubes; 8–10 torpedoes; 1 × 3-inch (76 mm) gun

HMS P38 was a Royal Navy U-class submarine built by Vickers-Armstrongs at Barrow-in-Furness.

== Career ==
P38 had a short-lived career with the Royal Navy. Commissioned in October 1941, she was assigned to operate with the 10th Flotilla based at Malta for operations in the Mediterranean Sea in January 1942, under the command of Lieutenant Rowland Hemingway. On her first patrol she sank the 4,115 GRT Italian cargo ship Ariosto off Cap Afrique, Tunisia on 15 February 1942. 138 Allied prisoners of war aboard were lost. This was the only successful attack by P38.

== Sinking ==
P38 left Malta on 16 February 1942, to intercept a very important large supply convoy for Axis forces off Tripoli, Libya. By 23 February, she was in position as the group of ships approached. Amongst them was the Italian torpedo boat Circe, equipped with German sonar and depth charge throwers. At 08:14 British time (10:14 Italian time), Circe reported a sonar contact at 1,800 m (5,900 ft) with a submarine and that she was turning in to attack, ordering the convoy to turn to port.

Shortly after 10:32 (Italian time), following a single attack in which all depth charges were dropped by Circe, P38 rose only to sink immediately again. At 10:40 (Italian time), after further attacks with depth charges and machine guns by the escorts Emanuele Pessagno, and Antoniotto Usodimare, as well as aircraft, during which one Italian rating was killed by friendly fire, P38 rose out of the water, her propellers still turning, steering planes set to surfacing, before crashing back beneath the waves at a bow-down angle of 40 degrees. A large patch of oil appeared on the surface as well as debris and human remains. P38 was sunk in 350 m (1,150 ft) of water in position 32 degrees 48 minutes north and 14 degrees 58 minutes east some 90 nautical miles (170 km; 100 mi) east of Tripoli, off Cape Misuratha. There were no survivors from her complement of 32.
