= British U-class submarine =

1940 class of British submarines

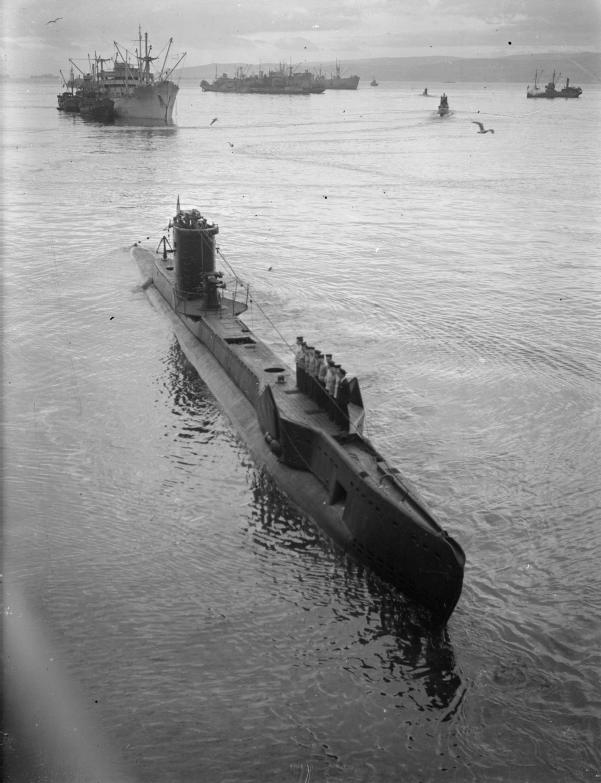
- U-class submarine HMS Ultimatum departing Holy Loch, August 1943

Class overview
- Name: U class
- Operators: Royal Navy; Polish Navy; Free French Naval Forces; Soviet Navy; Royal Netherlands Navy; Royal Danish Navy; Hellenic Navy; Royal Norwegian Navy
- Preceded by: T class
- Succeeded by: V class
- Completed: 49

General characteristics
- Type: Submarine
- Displacement: 540 long tons (550 t) standard, 630 long tons (640 t) full load surfaced; 730 tons submerged
- Length: 191 ft (58 m)
- Beam: 16 ft 1 in (4.90 m)
- Draught: 15 ft 2 in (4.62 m)
- Propulsion: 2 shaft diesel-electric; 2 Paxman Ricardo diesel generators + electric motors; 615 hp (459 kW), 825 hp (615 kW)
- Speed: 11.25 kn (20.84 km/h; 12.95 mph) surfaced; 10 kn (12 mph; 19 km/h) submerged
- Range: 4,500 nmi (8,300 km; 5,200 mi) at 11 kn (20 km/h; 13 mph) surfaced
- Complement: 27 to 31
- Armament: 6 × 21-inch (533 mm) torpedo tubes - 4 bow internal, 2 bow external (first group only) 8–10 torpedoes; 1 × 3 in (76 mm) gun

The British U-class submarines (officially "War Emergency 1940 and 1941 programmes, short hull") were a class of 49 small submarines built just before and during the Second World War. The class is sometimes known as the Undine class, after the first submarine built. A further development was the British V-class submarine of 1942.

At the start of the Second World War the U class was, with the British S and T-class submarines, the Dutch O 21 class and German Type VII one of the most advanced submarine classes in service.

== Background ==
The Royal Navy was limited to no more than 52,700 long tons (53,500 t) of submarines by the London Naval Treaty of 1930. The tonnage limit led to proposals for smaller submarines which was also prompted by trials with larger submarines demonstrating that they were easier to find and lacked manoeuvrability. By coincidence the First World War-vintage H-class submarines used for training in anti-submarine warfare were reaching the end of their useful service. The Rear-Admiral Submarines, Noel Laurence, wanted a class of small, inexpensive boats for training, armed with torpedoes for short-range patrols.

In March 1934 he approved a specification for a "Small, Simple, Submarine, for Anti-Submarine Training etc". The three Unity-class boats, HMS Undine, Unity and Ursula were ordered on 5 November 1936 from Vickers-Armstrongs, to be built at their Naval Construction Yard in Barrow-in-Furness. According to the recommendation of the Hopwood Committee of 1926 the boats had names beginning with the same letter in the alphabet. The new boats were the smallest built since the First World War. (Note: The weight of a submarine when under water must always equal the buoyancy. Extra weight has to be compensated for by removing an equal amount of ballast, which is near the keel causing the centre of gravity to rise. Buoyancy is also dependent on the density of the water around the boat. Before the Second World War submarines were designed to operate in waters with densities from fresh to highly saline.)

== Design and development ==
The U-class boats had a hull of riveted steel, half-an-inch thick for dives to 200 ft (61 m), with the fuel tanks and ballast tanks on the inside. The superstructure and conning tower were built with free-flooding holes and storage for cables, anchors and sundry items. The hull was divided by five bulkheads with access from the conning tower; hatches in the torpedo-stowage compartment and in the engine room had drop-down canvas trunks for emergencies. (Note: After closing all water-tight doors, the trunks were lowered and connected to the deck. The hatch was opened slightly until the air–water pressure was equal, the crew breathing the trapped air until escaping. Each crewman had a Davis Submerged Escape Apparatus of a nose-clip and mouthpiece connected to an oxygen bag. The first man in the trunking opened the hatch and left the boat, followed by the others in turn. Escape from the conning tower was by two men entering the tower, closing the lower hatch then opening the upper one to flood the space then leaving.) The boats had an 8 in (200 mm) bifocal periscope with high/low magnification for searching and a 6 in (150 mm) low magnification periscope for attack.

The periscopes could rise 12 ft (3.7 m) but such a shallow periscope depth could allow the boat to be seen from the air. Hydrophones were fitted, one on each side near the bows facing outwards and one on the conning tower facing aft. Asdic Type 129 was installed forward of the keel from 1937 and two wireless aerials were carried, a jumping aerial on the conning tower for very low frequency signals at periscope depth and a WT mast which could be raised above the water spread the second aerial for conventional wireless signalling.

The boats had six ordinary ballast tanks and a quick-diving, "Q tank", the ballast tanks, hydroplanes and the rudder being hydraulically operated; the forward hydroplanes were mounted high on the hull and folded upwards for docking. The submarines had two 400 hp (300 kW) Paxman diesel-electric engines generating 615 bhp (459 kW) and electric motors of 825 shp (615 kW) giving a surface speed of 11.25 kn (20.84 km/h; 12.95 mph) and a submerged speed of 10 kn (19 km/h; 12 mph). The diesels were linked to the propellers by two generators which kept charged the battery of 112 cells under the control room and crew accommodation. Submarine propellers had been designed to perform best on the surface until the Unity class which was the first submarine design with propellers giving their best performance submerged to reduce propeller noise but "singing propellers" were a constant problem for the class.

The boats had a fuel capacity of 38 long tons (39 t) giving a range of 3,800 nmi (7,000 km; 4,400 mi) at 10 kn (19 km/h; 12 mph) on the surface and 120 nmi (220 km; 140 mi) at 2 kn (3.7 km/h; 2.3 mph) submerged; battery recharging required the submarine to surface; in 1944 dummy snorkels were fitted to some boats for anti-submarine warfare training During construction the four internal bow torpedo tubes were supplemented by two external tubes in a bulged housing, four reloads being carried for the internal tubes. Ursula carried a 3 in (76 mm) gun but had no hatch for the gun crew, who had to use the conning tower; to compensate for the weight of the gun only eight torpedoes were carried. Just before the war, a second group of twelve vessels were ordered, HMS Unique, HMS Upholder, HMS Upright and HMS Utmost with the external tubes, the others without, because the bulge at the bow generated a large bow wave. Depth keeping was more difficult at periscope depth, a rather shallow 12 ft (3.7 m) which was more of a disadvantage than the six-torpedo salvo justified. The sudden loss of weight in the bows when the torpedoes were loosed in salvo made the boat porpoise and break the surface.

== Unity-class boats ==
Group one boats

The three Unity-class boats entered service in the latter half of 1938. Designed as training vessels, they were effective enough to persuade the Admiralty to build more and to improve their offensive capacity. Ursula was launched on 16 February 1938, was loaned to the Soviet Navy from 1944 to 1949 as V 4 and sold in May 1950 and broken up. Unity was launched on 16 February 1938 and sunk on 29 April 1940 in a collision with SS Atle Jarl off the Tyne. Undine was launched on 5 October 1937 and sunk by German minesweepers on 7 January 1940 off Heligoland.

Unity-class boats [Data from Chesneau (1992), Colledge and Wardlow (2006)]
Name/ No.	Launched	Notes
HMS Undine	5 October 1937	Sunk by German minesweepers off Heligoland, 7 January 1940
HMS Unity	16 February 1938	Sunk in collision with SS Alte Jarl 29 April 1940
HMS Ursula	16 February 1938	Loaned to Soviet Navy 1944–1949, sold 1950, broken up

== Group II boats ==
- Group Two boats

Class overview
- Name: Group two
- Completed: 12
- Lost: 9

General characteristics
- Type: Submarine
- Displacement: 630 tons surfaced, 732 tons submerged; 1940–1941 boats 658 tons surfaced, 740 tons submerged
- Length: 191 ft (58 m) (Note: 192 ft (59 m): Undaunted, Unon, Urchin and Urge; 197 ft (60 m) Umpire, Una after modification, Unbeaten and Unique)
- Beam: 16 ft (4.9 m)
- Draught: 10 ft (3.0 m)
- Installed power: 615 bhp (459 kW)
- Speed: 11.25 kn (20.84 km/h; 12.95 mph) surfaced; 9 kn (17 km/h; 10 mph) submerged
- Range: 3,800 mi (6,100 km) at 10 kn (19 km/h; 12 mph), 1940 and 1941 boats 5,000 mi (8,000 km) at 10 kn (19 km/h; 12 mph)
- Endurance: 120 mi (190 km) submerged
- Test depth: 200 ft (61 m)
- Complement: 36 officers and enlisted
- Armament: bow 4 × 21-inch (533 mm) torpedo tubes (8 × torpedoes); (later, 6 mines); 1 × QF 12-pounder (Note: Unbeaten and Unique later received 3-inch guns, all boats ordered 1940–1941 had 3-inch guns); 2, later 3 × .303-calibre machine-guns
- Notes: maximum complement 33 (Note: Data from McCartney (2006))

The experience gained with the U-class boats was incorporated into the Group two boats of the War Supplementary Emergency Programme, consisting of twelve submarines, of a similar design to the original three. The external torpedo tubes were omitted and the boats had a redesigned stern to reduce cavitation. On some of the boats a new bow shape was introduced to reduce the bow wave and the hydroplanes were enlarged for better submerged handling. The First World War-vintage 12-pounder was retained but replaced on Unbeaten and Unique by a 3-inch gun. The boats ordered in 1940 and 1941 carried the 3-inch gun and more fuel. Most of the boats were built by Vickers at Barrow-in-Furness; MI5 investigated the loss of Vandal and Untamed during training operations but the report was kept confidential.

In June 1940, the Admiralty had stopped naming submarines and used their pennant numbers. On 4 November 1942 the Prime Minister, Winston Churchill, questioned the policy. The First Lord of the Admiralty replied that naming had been dropped to avoid confusion because the big increase in the number of destroyers, which usually had names with the same initial letter. Numbering submarines had been the practice in the First World War but because of Churchill's views, the Admiralty decided that it was better to be right than consistent and naming was resumed. After a delay, Churchill was told that it was difficult to find sufficient names beginning with U and that the remainder were being named with words beginning with "V" and a list was sent to Churchill on 27 December 1942. Submarines lost before they could receive names kept their pennant number.

The group included submarines that became well-known; Urchin was transferred to the Polish Navy as ORP Sokół and sank 55,000 long tons (56,000 t) of Axis shipping. In the 16-month operational career of Upholder (Lieutenant-Commander Malcolm Wanklyn) in the Mediterranean, Upholder carried out 24 patrols and sank around 119,000 long tons (121,000 t) of Axis ships, consisting of three U-boats, a destroyer, 15 merchant ships with possibly a cruiser and another destroyer also sunk before being lost in April 1942. Wanklyn was awarded the Victoria Cross for attacking a well-defended convoy and sinking the Italian liner Conte Rosso on 25 May 1941. Losses in this group were high, only three out of the twelve survived the war.

=== 4 September 1939 batch ===
Group II boats [Data from Walters (2004), Colledge and Wardlow (2006)]
Name/ No.	Ordered	Notes
HMS Umpire	4 September 1939	Rammed accidentally and sunk by trawler Peter Hendriks, 17 July 1941, North Sea, 22 killed
HMS Una	4 September 1939	Sold 11 April 1949, broken up
HMS Unbeaten	4 September 1939	Sunk by British bomber, 11 November 1942, Bay of Biscay
HMS Undaunted	4 September 1939	Sunk 13 May 1941 off Libyan coast
HMS Union	4 September 1939	Sunk 20 July 1941 by Italian torpedo boat and aircraft near Panttellaria
HMS Unique	4 September 1939	Sunk 24 October 1942 west of Gibraltar
HMS Upholder	4 September 1939	Sunk 14 April 1942 by the Italian torpedo boat Pegaso off Tripoli
HMS Upright	4 September 1939	Sold 19 December 1945, broken up March 1946
HMS Urchin	4 September 1939	Loaned to the Polish Navy November 1941–1946 as ORP Sokół; named P97 in 1946, broken up 1949
HMS Urge	4 September 1939	Sunk 6 May 1942 by Italian torpedo boat Pegaso
HMS Usk	4 September 1939	Sunk, thought mined, 3 May 1941 off Cap Bon, Tunisia
HMS Utmost	4 September 1939	Sunk 24 November 1942 by Italian torpedo boat Groppo west of Sicily

== Group III boats ==
- Group three boats

Class overview
- Name: Group three
- Completed: 34

General characteristics
- Type: Submarine
- Displacement: 662 long tons (673 t) surfaced, 740 long tons (750 t)
- Length: 205 ft (62 m)
- Beam: 16 ft (4.9 m)
- Draught: 10 ft (3.0 m)
- Installed power: 800 bhp (600 kW) engines, 760 bhp (570 kW) motors
- Speed: 12.75 kn (23.61 km/h; 14.67 mph) surfaced; 9 kn (17 km/h; 10 mph) submerged
- Range: 5,000 mi (8,000 km) at 10 kn (19 km/h; 12 mph)
- Endurance: 120 mi (190 km) submerged
- Test depth: 300 ft (91 m)
- Complement: 37 (maximum)
- Armament: bow 4 × 21-inch (533 mm) torpedo tubes (8 × torpedoes); (later, 6 mines); 1 × QF 12-pounder; 3 × machine-guns)
- Notes: Data from McCartney, p. 17, British Submarines 1939–45, 2006, Osprey Publishing, Oxford, ISBN 978-1-84603-007-9

The third group formed the largest group of U-class submarines, comprising 34 vessels ordered in three batches. Losses continued to be high. In June 1940 the decision was taken, in view of the anticipated high number of submarines to be ordered, to drop the practice of naming submarines and the vessels were called P31 to P39, P41 to P49. At the end of 1942 Winston Churchill ordered that all submarines were to receive names but eight of the U-class boats were lost before they could receive them, whilst on operations with the Royal Navy.

=== 11 March 1940 batch ===
Group III boats [Data from Walters (2004), Colledge and Wardlow (2006)]
Name/ No.	Ordered	Notes
HMS Ullswater	11 March 1940	Renamed Uproar April 1943, sold 13 February 1946, broken up
HMS P32	11 March 1940	Mined off Tripoli 18 August 1941 before named
HMS P33	11 March 1940	Presumed lost to a mine off Tripoli, 20 August 1941, before named
HMS Ultimatum	11 March 1940	Sold 23 December 1949 broken up
HMS Umbra	11 March 1940	Sold 9 July 1946, broken up
HMS P36	11 March 1940	Delivered agents to France late 1941, transferred to Mediterranean, lost before naming
HMS Unbending	11 March 1940	Sold 23 December 1949, broken up 1950
HMS P38	11 March 1940	Sunk by Italian ships Circe and Usodimare off Tunisia 25 February 1942 before named
HMS P39	11 March 1940	Sunk during air attack on Malta 26 March 1942 before named, raised June 1943, broken up 1954
HMS P41	11 March 1940	To Royal Norwegian Navy as HNoMS Uredd; mined, all 39 men lost, after 5 February 1943. (Note: The wreck was discovered near the north end of the Flankensperre minefield in 1985. The field had been extended in mid-1942 unknown to the Admiralty.)

=== 23 August 1940 batch ===
Group III boats [Data from Walters (2004), Colledge and Wardlow (2006)]
Name/ No.	Ordered	Notes
HMS Unbroken	23 August 1940	Loaned to Soviet Navy 1944–1949 as V 2, returned 1949, broken up 9 May 1950
HMS Unison	23 August 1940	Loaned to Soviet Navy 1944–1949 as V 3, returned 1949, scrapped in May 1950
HMS United	23 August 1940	Broken up 12 February 1946
HMS Unrivalled	23 August 1940	Arrived 22 January 1946 for breaking up
HMS Unruffled	23 August 1940	Broken up January 1946
HMS P47	23 August 1940	Loaned to the Royal Netherlands Navy as HNLMS Dolfijn
HMS P48	23 August 1940	Sunk in Gulf of Tunis by Italian ship Ardente 25 December 1942 before named
HMS Unruly	23 August 1940	Arrived February 1946 for breaking up
HMS Unseen	23 August 1940	Arrived 11 May 1949 for breaking up
HMS P52	23 August 1940	Loaned to the Polish Navy as ORP Dzik and post-war to the Royal Danish Navy as HDMS U 1 Springeren
HMS Ultor	23 August 1940	Sold 22 January 1946, broken up
HMS Unshaken	23 August 1940	Broken up March 1946

=== 12 July 1941 batch ===
Group III boats [Data from Walters (2004), Colledge and Wardlow (2006)]
Name/ No.	Ordered	Notes
HMS Unsparing	12 July 1941	Sold 14 February 1946, broken up
HMS Usurper	12 July 1941	Sunk 4 October 1943 by German ship UJ2208 or by mine in the Gulf of Genoa
HMS Universal	12 July 1941	sold February 1946
HMS Untamed	12 July 1941	Foundered 30 May 1943, raised 5 July, renamed HMS Vitality, sold 1946 for breaking up
HMS Untiring	12 July 1941	Loaned 1945 to 1953 to the Royal Hellenic Navy as HS Xifias, sunk 1957 as an Asdic target
HMS Varangian	12 July 1941	sold June 1949, broken up
HMS Uther	12 July 1941	Sold February 1950, arrived 20 February 1950 for breaking up
HMS Unswerving	12 July 1941	Arrived 10 July 1949 for breaking up
HMS Vandal	12 July 1941	Wrecked 24 February 1943, Firth of Clyde
HMS Upstart	12 July 1941	Loaned post-war to the Royal Hellenic Navy as HS Amphitriti
HMS Varne I	12 July 1941	Loaned to the Royal Norwegian Navy as HNoMS Ula
HMS Vortex	12 July 1941	Loaned post-war to the Royal Danish Navy as HDMS U 3 Sælen
HMS Vox I	12 July 1941	Loaned to the Free French Naval Forces as Curie
HMS Vulpine	12 July 1941	Loaned post-war to the Royal Danish Navy as HDMS U 2 Støren

== V-class submarine ==
The V-class boats were the final refinement of the U-class submarines, 34 were ordered and 21 were built by Vickers for the War Emergency Programmes of 1941 and 1942, the rest being cancelled. The hull was further lengthened to try to eliminate the singing propellers and the bows were more streamlined. Welding of the hull frames was introduced to use thicker steel for the pressure hull, giving a diving depth of 300 ft (91 m). None of the V-class boats were lost and some did not see service. The boats were named HMS Upshot, HMS Urtica, Vagabond, Variance, HMS Venturer, HMS Vigorous, Viking, HMS Vampire, Varne II, Veldt, HMS Vineyard, Virtue, Visigoth, HMS Vivid, Voracious, Votary, Vox II, HMS Virulent, Volatile, Vortex and Vulpine.

== See also ==
- List of submarines of France
