= HMS Utmost =

Submarine of the Royal Navy

Coordinates: 38°31′0″N 12°01′0″E

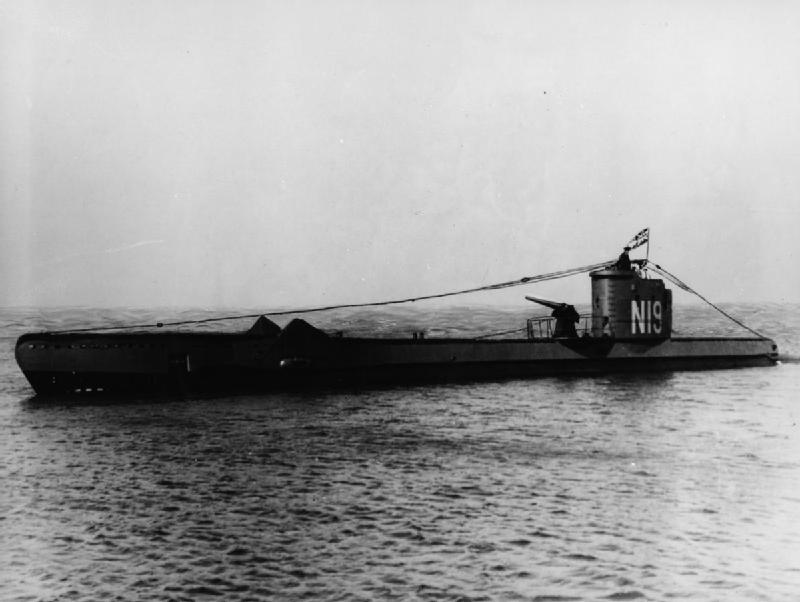
- HMS Utmost

History

United Kingdom
- Name: HMS Utmost
- Builder: Vickers-Armstrongs, Barrow-in-Furness
- Laid down: 2 November 1939
- Launched: 20 April 1940
- Commissioned: 17 August 1940
- Fate: Sunk 25 November 1942
- Badge

General characteristics
- Displacement: Surfaced - 540 tons standard, 630 tons full load; Submerged - 730 tons
- Length: 58.22 m (191 feet)
- Beam: 4.90 m (16 ft 1 in)
- Draught: 4.62 m (15 ft 2 in)
- Propulsion: 2 shaft diesel-electric; 2 Paxman Ricardo diesel generators + electric motors; 615 / 825 hp
- Speed: 11.25 knots max surfaced; 10 knots max submerged
- Complement: 27-31
- Armament: 4 bow internal 21 inch (533 mm) torpedo tubes, 2 external; 10 torpedoes; 1 - 3-inch (76 mm) gun

HMS Utmost was a British U class submarine, of the second group of that class, built by Vickers-Armstrongs, Barrow-in-Furness. She was laid down on 2 November 1939 and was commissioned on 17 August 1940. So far she has been the only ship of the Royal Navy to bear the name Utmost.

== Career ==
Utmost spent most of her career operating in the Mediterranean, where she sank the Italian merchants Capo Vita, Enrico Costa, and Frederico C., and the German tanker Languste and also damaged the Italian merchant Manfredo Camperio. Utmost also attacked a convoy of five German merchants and three Italian destroyers and torpedoed and sunk the German merchant Heraklea and torpedoed and damaged Ruhr. An attack on another convoy made up of the German merchant Tilly L.M. Russ and the Italian merchant Cadamosto, escorted by the Italian torpedo boats Pallade and Polluce, was less successful. All torpedoes fired missed their targets.

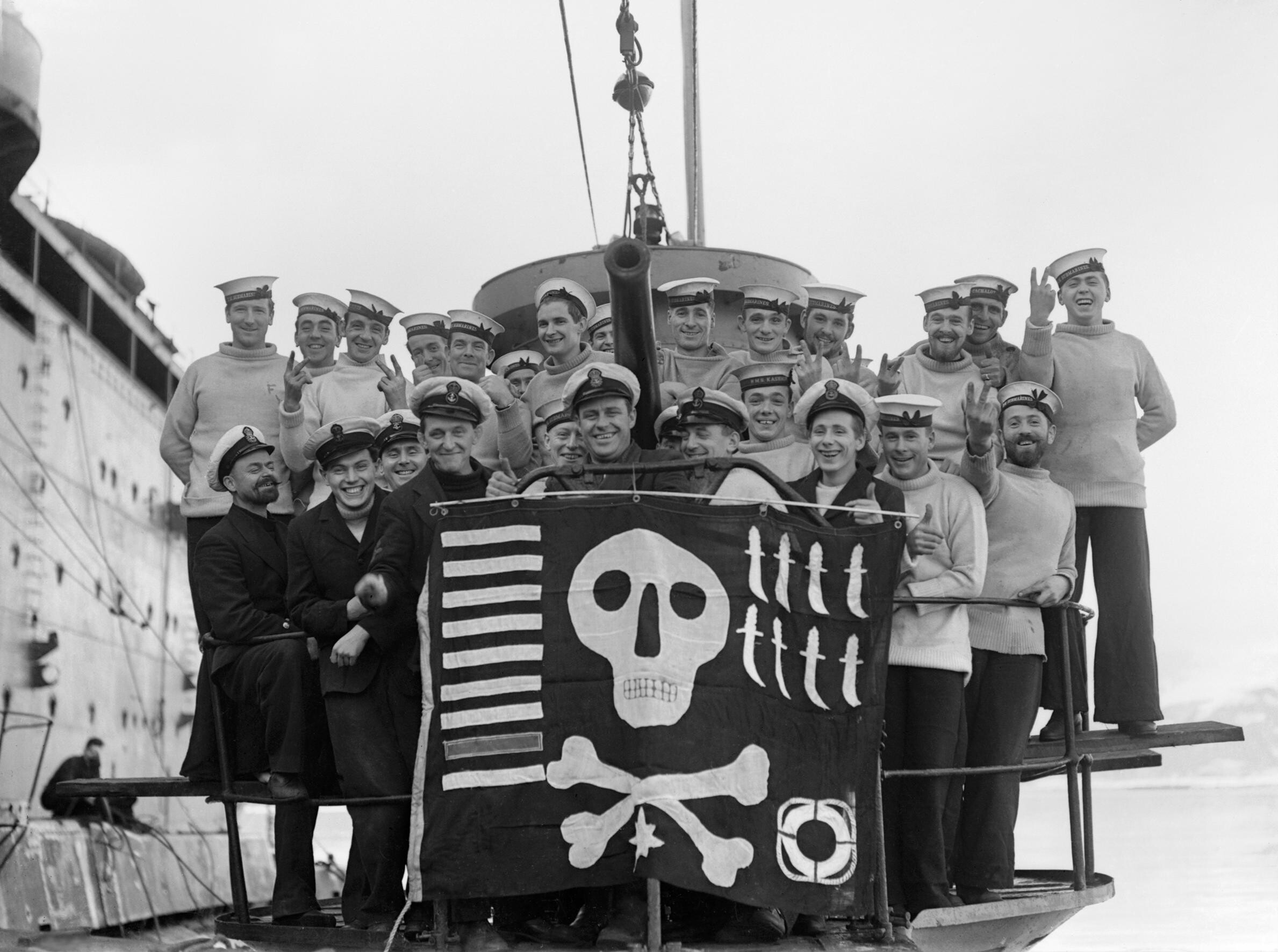
Crew of HMS Utmost with their "Jolly Roger" success flag

Utmost went on to destroy the (already grounded and damaged) Italian merchant Marigola, and together with her sister, since transferred to the Poles, ORP Sokół, sank the Italian merchant Balilla. Utmost later unsuccessfully attacked the Italian merchants Fabio Filzi and Siculo, as well as the Italian auxiliary minelayer Barletta. She also torpedoed and damaged the Italian cruiser Trieste.

The Commanding Officer received a Distinguished Service Order for a mission, which is believed to have been the landing of agents behind enemy lines.

== Sinking ==
Utmost left Malta for a patrol in the Mediterranean in November 1942. On the 23rd she sank an enemy ship, but on 25 November 1942, during her return journey to Malta, she was located, attacked and sunk south west off Sicily by depth charges from the Italian torpedo boat Groppo.
