= HMS Upright =

Submarine of the Royal Navy

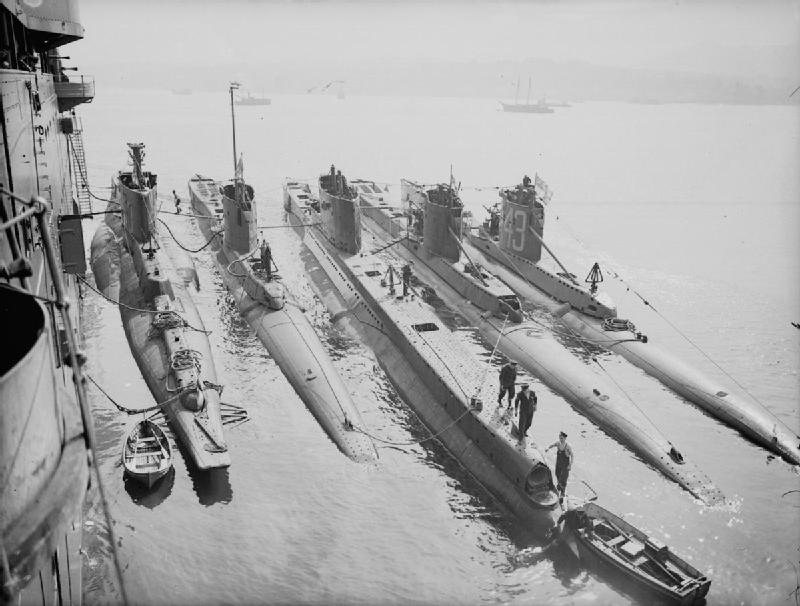
- HMS Upright (second from left)

History

United Kingdom
- Name: HMS Upright
- Builder: Vickers Armstrongs, Barrow-in-Furness
- Laid down: 6 November 1939
- Launched: 21 April 1940
- Commissioned: 3 September 1940
- Fate: Scrapped March 1946
- Badge

General characteristics
- Class & type: U-class submarine
- Displacement: Surfaced - 540 tons standard, 630 tons full load; Submerged - 730 tons
- Length: 58.22 m (191 ft)
- Beam: 4.90 m (16 ft 1 in)
- Draught: 4.62 m (15 ft 2 in)
- Propulsion: 2 shaft diesel-electric; 2 Paxman Ricardo diesel generators + electric motors; 615 / 825 hp
- Speed: 11.25 knots max surfaced; 10 knots max submerged
- Complement: 27-31
- Armament: 4 bow internal 21 inch (533 mm) torpedo tubes, 2 external; 10 torpedoes; 1 - 3-inch (76 mm) gun

HMS Upright was a British U-class submarine, of the second group of that class, built by Vickers Armstrongs, Barrow-in-Furness. She was laid down on 6 November 1939 and was commissioned on 3 September 1940. So far she has been the only ship of the Royal Navy to bear the name Upright.

== Career ==
Upright spent most of her career operating in the Mediterranean, where she sank the Italian submarine chaser Albatros, Italian merchants Silvia Tripcovich, and Fabio Filzi and Carlo del Greco, which were transporting the M13/40 tanks of the XII Tank Battalion M13/40 of the 133rd Tank Infantry Regiment to Libya. HMS Upright also sank the Italian light cruiser Armando Diaz and an Italian drydock under tow. She also damaged the transport Galilea. She launched an unsuccessful attack on an Italian floating drydock, and a convoy, missing her target, the Italian merchant Calino. Upright was heavily depth charged by the escorts, following the attack.

Nevertheless, Upright survived the war, and was sold to be broken up for scrap on 19 December 1945. She was scrapped at Troon in March 1946.
