= HMS Unique (N95) =

Submarine of the Royal Navy

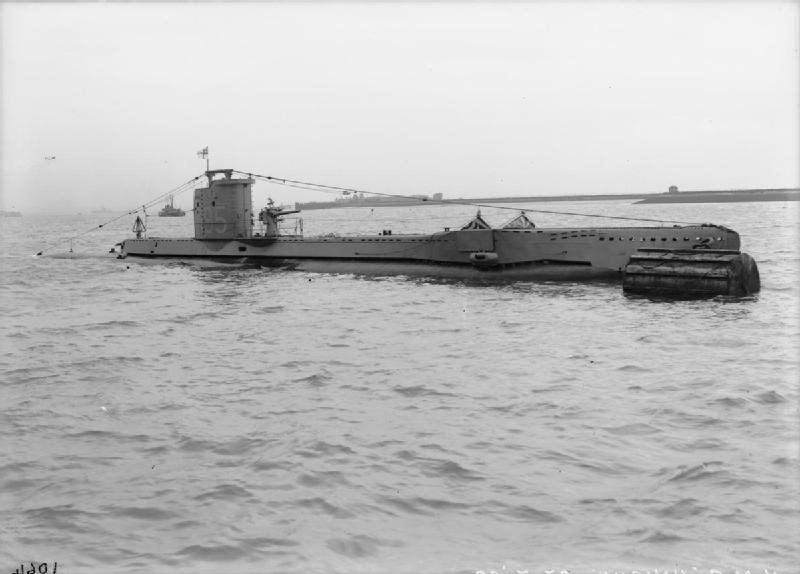
- HMS Unique

History

United Kingdom
- Name: HMS Unique
- Builder: Vickers Armstrongs, Barrow-in-Furness
- Laid down: 30 October 1939
- Launched: 6 June 1940
- Commissioned: 27 September 1940
- Fate: Missing after 7 October 1942
- Badge

General characteristics
- Class & type: U-class submarine
- Displacement: Surfaced - 540 tons standard, 630 tons full load; Submerged - 730 tons
- Length: 58.22 m (191 ft 0 in)
- Beam: 4.90 m (16 ft 1 in)
- Draught: 4.62 m (15 ft 2 in)
- Propulsion: 2 shaft diesel-electric; 2 Paxman Ricardo diesel generators + electric motors; 615 / 825 hp
- Speed: 11.25 knots (20.84 km/h; 12.95 mph) max surfaced; 10 knots (19 km/h; 12 mph) max submerged
- Complement: 27–31
- Armament: 4 bow internal 21-inch (533 mm) torpedo tubes, 2 external; 10 torpedoes; 1 - 3-inch (76 mm) gun

HMS Unique was a U-class submarine of the Royal Navy, of the second group of that class, built by Vickers Armstrongs, Barrow-in-Furness. She was laid down on 30 October 1939 and was commissioned on 27 September 1940.

== Career ==
She spent most of her career operating in the Mediterranean from mid 1941 under the command of Captain Arthur Hezlet, where she sank the Italian passenger/cargo ship Fenicia and the Italian troop transport Esperia. She also damaged the Italian cargo ship Arsia, which was later declared a total loss. On 5 January 1942, she made an unsuccessful attack on the Italian battleship Littorio.

== Sinking ==
Unique left Holy Loch after a refit, for a patrol in the Bay of Biscay on 7 October 1942. She left her escort off the Scillies on 9 October. No more was seen or heard from her after that date. HMS Ursula was in the area on 10 October and reported hearing underwater explosions that led her to believe Unique was under attack, although the Germans made no claims of her sinking. She was reported overdue on 24 October 1942 when she failed to arrive at Gibraltar. It's believed that Unique was sunk by the explosion of one of her own torpedos while launching at the German freighter Spicheren at position 46°32′N 06°03′W.
