= List of ship names of the Royal Navy (U–Z) =

This is a list of Royal Navy ship names starting with U, V, W, X, Y, and Z.

== U ==
- U1407
- Ufton
- Uganda
- Ulex
- Ulleswater
- Ulster
- Ulster Monarch
- Ulster Queen
- Ultimatum
- Ultor
- Ulysses
- Umbra
- Umpire
- Una
- Unbeaten
- Unbending
- Unbridled
- Unbroken
- Undaunted
- Undine
- Unicorn
- Unicorn Prize
- Union
- Unique
- Unison
- Unite
- United
- Unity
- Unity II
- Unity III
- Universal
- Unrivalled
- Unruffled
- Unruly
- Unseen
- Unshaken
- Unsparing
- Unswerving
- Untamed
- Untiring
- Upas
- Upholder
- Uppingham
- Upright
- Uproar
- Upshot
- Upstart
- Upton
- Upward
- Urania
- Uranie
- Urchin
- Ure
- Urge
- Urgent
- Ursa
- Ursula
- Urtica
- Usk
- Usurper
- Uther
- Utile
- Utmost
- Utopia
- Utrecht

== V ==
- V1
- V2
- V3
- V4
- Vagabond
- Valentine
- Valeur
- Valhalla
- Valiant
- Valkyrie
- Valorous
- Vampire
- Vancouver
- Vandal
- Vandyck
- Vanessa
- Vanguard
- Vanity
- Vanneau
- Vanoc
- Vanquisher
- Vansittart
- Varangian
- Variable
- Varne
- Vascama
- Vautour
- Vectis
- Vega
- Vehement
- Velox
- Vendetta
- Venerable
- Venetia
- Vengeance
- Vengeful
- Vengeur
- Venom
- Venomous
- Venturer
- Venturous
- Venus
- Verbena
- Verdun
- Verity
- Vernon
- Vernon II
- Vernon III
- Vernon IV
- Veronica
- Versatile
- Verulam
- Vervain
- Vesper
- Vesta
- Vestal
- Vesuve
- Vesuvius
- Vetch
- Veteran
- Viceroy
- Victor
- Victor Emmanuel
- Victoria
- Victorious
- Victory
- Vidette
- Vienna
- Vigilant
- Vigilante
- Vigo
- Viking
- Ville de Paris
- Vimiera
- Vimy
- Vincejo
- Vindex
- Vindictive
- Vineyard
- Violent
- Violet
- Viper
- Vipere
- Virago
- Virginia
- Virginian
- Virginie
- Virulent
- Viscount
- Visenda
- Vitality
- Vittoria
- Vivacious
- Vivid
- Vivien
- Vivo
- Vixen
- Volador
- Volage
- Volcano
- Voltaire
- Volunteer
- Vortex
- Vortigern
- Vox
- Voyager
- Vulcan
- Vulcan II
- Vulture

== W ==
- W1
- W2
- W3
- W4
- Wager
- Wagtail
- Wahine
- Waitemata
- Wakeful
- Waldegrave
- Walker
- Walkerton
- Wallace
- Wallaroo
- Wallflower
- Walmer Castle
- Walney
- Walpole
- Walrus
- Warmingham
- Wanderer
- Warren Hastings
- Warrior
- Warspite
- Warwick
- Wasp
- Wasperton
- Wassenaar
- Watchful
- Watchman
- Watchmoor
- Waterhen
- Waterloo
- Waterwitch
- Wave
- Waveney
- Wear
- Weazel
- Weazle
- Welcome
- Welfare
- Welland
- Wellesley
- Wellington
- Welshman
- Wem
- Wennington
- Wensleydale
- Weser
- Wessex
- West Florida
- Westcott
- Western Isles
- Westminster
- Wexford
- Wexham
- Weybourne
- Weymouth
- Wheatland
- Whelp
- Whimbrel
- Whippingham
- Whirlwind
- Whitaker
- Whitby
- Whitehall
- Whitehaven
- Whitesand Bay
- Whiting
- Whitley
- Whitshed
- Whitton
- Widemouth Bay
- Widgeon
- Widnes
- Wigtown Bay
- Wickieston
- Wilberforce
- Wild Boar
- Wild Goose
- Wild Swan
- Wildfire
- Wilhelmina
- William & Mary
- Willowherb
- Wilton
- Winchelsea
- Winchester
- Windflower
- Windsor
- Windsor Castle
- Wintringham
- Wishart
- Wistaria
- Wiston
- Witch
- Witherington
- Wivenhoe
- Wivern
- Wizard
- Woldingham
- Wolf
- Wolfe
- Wolfhound
- Wolsey
- Wolverine
- Wolverton
- Woodbridge Haven
- Woodcock
- Woodlark
- Woodpecker
- Woodruff
- Woolaston
- Woolf
- Woolston
- Woolvesey Castle
- Woolwich
- Woolwich Transport
- Worcester
- Worcester Prize
- Worthing
- Wotton
- Wrangler
- Wren
- Wrenn
- Wrentham
- Wrestler
- Wryneck
- Wulastock
- Wyandra
- Wye
- Wyvern

== X ==
- X1
- X2
- Xenophon

== Y ==
- Yarmouth
- Yarmouth II
- Yarnton
- Yaxham
- Yealmpton
- Yeoman
- Yeovil
- York
- York Castle
- Young Hebe
- Young Hoblin
- Young King
- Young Lady
- Young Lion
- Young Prince
- Young Shish
- Young Spragge
- Ypres

== Z ==
- Z4
- Z5
- Z6
- Z7
- Z8
- Z10
- Z30
- Z38
- Zambesi
- Zanzibar
- Zealandia
- Zealand
- Zealous
- Zebra
- Zeebrugge
- Zenith
- Zenobia
- Zephyr
- Zest
- Zetland
- Zingarella
- Zinnia
- Zodiac
- Zubian
- Zulu
- Zylpha

== See also ==
- List of aircraft carriers of the Royal Navy
- List of amphibious warfare ships of the Royal Navy
- List of battlecruisers of the Royal Navy
- List of pre-dreadnought battleships of the Royal Navy
- List of dreadnought battleships of the Royal Navy
- List of corvette and sloop classes of the Royal Navy
- List of cruiser classes of the Royal Navy
- List of destroyer classes of the Royal Navy
- List of patrol vessels of the Royal Navy
- List of frigate classes of the Royal Navy
- List of mine countermeasure vessels of the Royal Navy (includes minesweepers and mine hunters)
- List of monitors of the Royal Navy
- List of Royal Fleet Auxiliary ship names
- List of Royal Navy shore establishments
- List of submarines of the Royal Navy
- List of survey vessels of the Royal Navy
