= Windflower =

Windflower may refer to:

== Plants ==
- Anemone, a genus of plants in the buttercup family, Ranunculaceae
  - Anemonoides nemorosa, a species of flowering plant
  - The flower Adonis turns into after having been torn to pieces by a boar in Ovid's "Venus and Adonis"
- Pulsatilla, a genus of plants in the buttercup family, Ranunculaceae

== Music ==
- Windflower, a piano composition by American pianist John Burke from the 2016 album Orogen
- Windflower (album), by Herb Ellis and Remo Palmier (1978)
- "Wind Flower", the lead single from K-pop girl group Mamamoo's EP Blue;s
- "Windflowers", a song by Seals and Crofts from the 1974 album Unborn Child

== Other uses ==
- Windflower (novel) (La Rivière sans repos), a 1970 novel by Canadian author Gabrielle Roy
- HMCS Windflower, a 1940 Royal Canadian Navy Flower-class corvette
- HMS Windflower, British Royal Navy ships
- Windflower, a 2006 novel written by Nick Bantock
- Windflowers, a 1902 painting of John William Waterhouse
- Sir Edward Elgar's private name for Alice Stuart-Wortley; see Elgar's Violin Concerto

== See also ==
- Wildflower (disambiguation)
