= Arthur Hezlet =

Royal Navy admiral (1914-2007)

Vice-Admiral Sir Arthur Hezlet KBE CB DSO* DSC
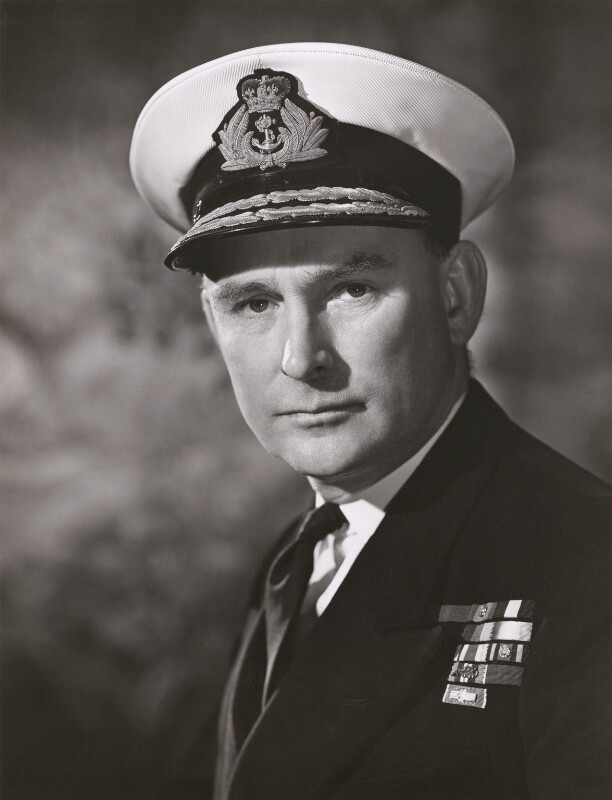
- Vice Admiral Sir Arthur Richard Hezlet
- Born: 7 April 1914; Pretoria, South Africa
- Died: 7 November 2007 (aged 93); Bovagh, County Londonderry, Northern Ireland
- Military career
- Allegiance: United Kingdom
- Branch: Royal Navy
- Service years: 1928–1964
- Rank: Vice-Admiral
- Nickname: Baldy
- Commands: HMS H44, HMS Unique, HMS Ursula, HMS Upholder, HMS Trident, HMS Trenchant, HMS Newfoundland
- Conflicts: World War II: Occupation of Norway; Operation Source; Action of 8 June 1945
- Awards: KBE CB DSO and Bar DSC Legion of Merit (United States) Mentioned in Despatches
- Other work: N.I. president of the Royal British Legion; RNLI; Member of the general synod of the Church of Ireland council member of the University of Ulster, Author of several books.

Vice-Admiral Sir Arthur Richard Hezlet KBE CB DSO* DSC (7 April 1914 – 7 November 2007), nicknamed Baldy Hezlet, was a decorated Royal Navy submariner. He became the Royal Navy's youngest captain at the time – aged 36 – and its youngest admiral, aged 45. In retirement he became a military historian.

He was a recipient of the Order of the British Empire, the Most Honourable Order of the Bath, the Distinguished Service Order and Bar, the Distinguished Service Cross, and the Legion of Merit.

== Early life ==
Hezlet was born in Pretoria, South Africa, to Major-General Robert Knox Hezlet, CB, CBE, DSO and Josepha Dorothy Hezlet (née Arter). His father had a distinguished career in the British Army including appointments as director of artillery at the War Office (1930 to 1934) and in India (1934 to 1938).

Hezlet joined the Royal Navy in January 1928, aged 13. He attended the Royal Naval College, Dartmouth and the Royal Naval College, Greenwich, and went to sea in 1932, serving as a midshipman on the battleships HMS Royal Oak (September 1931 – January 1934) and HMS Resolution (March – July 1934). Hezlet was promoted to Lieutenant on 1 April 1936, achieving the highest mark in his Lieutenant's examinations, winning the Ronald Megaw Memorial Prize. In December 1935 he began the submarine course at HMS Dolphin, something for which he had "not applied or volunteered". By 1936, he was the correspondence officer on the destroyer HMS Daring, later volunteering to serve on submarines. By July 1937 he was serving on the submarine HMS Regulus on the China station as Navigating Officer and then Torpedo Officer. On his return home, he was appointed First Lieutenant of HMS H43 in which he served from January 1938 to April 1939.

== Second World War ==
From June 1939 Lt. Hezlet served as First Lieutenant on the submarine HMS Trident. By early 1940, he was engaged in operations in the Norwegian Sea, as the Germans launched their occupation of Norway. His last patrols in Trident in 1940 were in the Bay of Biscay, off Lorient.

In autumn 1940, Hezlet left the Trident to attend the submarine Commanding Officers Qualifying Course ("the Perisher"). The course was run at Fort Blockhouse, Gosport, and from the depot ship HMS Cyclops in the Clyde, where the 7th Submarine Flotilla had been established, consisting of older submarines. Hezlet later recalled having carried out about fifteen simulated attacks in elderly submarines in the Clyde on various kinds of mainly unsuitable target, following which it was declared he had passed. He found the training to be inadequate preparation. On 22 December 1940 he took command of the obsolete coastal submarine HMS H44, spending three months in her, until 9 March 1941, tasked with training convoy escorts in anti-submarine warfare. During that period he managed to increase the number of simulated attacks under his belt.

=== Operations in the Mediterranean ===
In April or May 1941 Hezlet was sent to Malta, aboard HMS Cachalot, to be the "spare CO" in the 10th Submarine Flotilla based there (there was no bunk-space for him on Cachalot and so he slept in a cupboard from which books had been removed to make space for him). At Malta, the spare CO's duties were to be harbourmaster, administering spare crew and meeting every submarine when she came in.

==== Patrols in HMS Upholder and HMS Unique ====
In mid-summer 1941, it was considered by the flotilla command that the operational submarine commanders were becoming fatigued. Hezlet was sent on two patrols as relief for commanders who needed rest. The first began on 6 June 1941 when he was sent out in HMS Upholder, Lieutenant Commander Malcolm Wanklyn's boat, which ended on 17 June 1941 and was uneventful. The second began on 16 August 1941, when he took out HMS Unique in order to give its commander, Lt. Collett, a rest. That patrol would prove more testing. Unique and HMS P32 and HMS P33 were tasked with attacking a convoy off Tripoli. P33, unbeknownst to Hezlet at the time, had already hit a mine and had been lost with all hands. On 20 August Unique and P32 attacked. Hezlet fired four torpedoes – his first-ever torpedo attack on the enemy - at the 11,398 GRT Italian troop ship Esperia and sank her. Upon launching torpedoes from a U-class submarine, the commander had to ensure that the buoyancy caused by the torpedo tubes being filled with air did not cause the submarine to surface. He also had to get the submarine away from the end of the "tracks" made by the torpedoes moving through the water, because they would provide a visible indication to observers on the surface, and in the air, of the location of the submarine which had fired them. Hezlet was so preoccupied with these two tasks that he did not himself hear the torpedoes hit but was assured by the general jubilation in the control room that they had. An attack on Unique by an Italian flying boat later that day damaged one of her fuel tanks, and so Hezlet returned early from patrol. Upon his return to Malta, he learned that both P33 and P32 had been lost, making Unique the only submarine to survive the mission. Hezlet turned Unique back over to Lt. Collett and resumed his duties as spare CO. In November 1941 Hezlet was awarded the Distinguished Service Cross for the sinking of the Esperia.

==== HMS Ursula (N 59) ====
In September 1941 Hezlet was given his first permanent command – HMS Ursula - after her captain went sick. Of his six patrols in her, two merit reference, though neither resulted in her sinking an enemy ship. The first began on 16 September 1941, when Ursula was sent as part of a task group with HMS Upholder, HMS Unbeaten and HMS Upright to attack a convoy off Tripoli. Ursula was posted about 50 miles away from the main night-attack by the other submarines in order to carry out a daylight attack in the morning. Hezlet fired one torpedo at the Italian troopship Vulcania, but it was a long-range shot and missed. Upholder had more luck earlier that morning, successfully sinking the Italian merchant ships Neptunia and Oceania in that convoy. The second patrol saw Ursula head for the Strait of Messina, where she fired four torpedoes at two merchant vessels, damaging the Italian merchantman Beppe. The noteworthy feature of that patrol was that, from leaving Malta until and including launching her torpedoes, Ursula kept exactly the same course without deviating.

=== Operations in Home Waters and Convoy Escort Duty ===
By late 1941, Ursula was due for a refit. On 15 December 1941 she was ordered to return to Gibraltar. When she arrived she was quickly ordered out to patrol the Bay of Biscay because it was feared that the German battleships Scharnhorst and Gneisenau, and the heavy cruiser Prinz Eugen, all lying at Brest, were imminently to come out. They did not do so during Ursula's patrol (not emerging until 22 February 1942) and Hezlet handed Ursula over for refit at Chatham on 12 January 1942.

==== HMS Trident (N 52) ====
In late March 1942 Hezlet was given command of HMS Trident, the boat in which he had been First Lieutenant at the beginning of the war, with Ian McGeoch as his first lieutenant. After brief exercises in the Clyde, Trident embarked on her first patrol under Hezlet's command to Norwegian waters, off Trondheim. Hezlet later recalled that his instructions were not to fire at anything but Tirpitz, which had arrived at Trondheim on 13 March 1942, and that he consequently had a frustrating time watching hundreds of thousands of tonnes of unescorted shipping plying the coastal waters. That appears potentially open to doubt because patrol reports appear to indicate that Hezlet made two attacks against merchant ships during that patrol, one unsuccessful but the latter, on 20 April 1942, resulting in his sinking of the German merchant ship Hödur, which he hit with two out of three torpedoes fired. The target sank in less than 5 minutes.

After further brief exercises in the Clyde in early May, Trident was ordered to Iceland to meet and escort convoy PQ16 to northern Russia. She was one of two submarines assigned to this duty, the other being HMS Seawolf. This eventful patrol saw Trident pick up nine survivors from the American merchantman Alamar which had been abandoned due to air attack (and carry out orders to torpedo its remains) as well as try to fend off other air attacks using her anti-aircraft guns. The convoy underwent five days of air attacks from Luftwaffe aircraft as well a submarine attacks. Of the 35 ships which left Iceland, 8 were lost. After a short anti-U-boat patrol from Polyarnoe, in June 1942 Trident was tasked with providing cover to convoys QP 13 and PQ 17 in the Barents Sea and Norwegian Sea, before returning to the UK. In August 1942, Hezlet was mentioned in dispatches for his service in escorting these convoys.

==== X-craft crew instructor ====
Hezlet became a special training officer on the banks of the River Clyde in September 1942, at the informally named "HMS Varbel", training the crews of midget submarines to attack the German battleship Tirpitz. He invented the "Hezlet Rail", a bar and strap to secure the watchkeeper to the X-craft's casing in bad weather.

==== HMS Thrasher (N 37) ====
In May 1943, Hezlet was appointed as the Lieutenant in Command of HMS Thrasher (N 37). From May to August 1943 she took part in exercises in Scottish waters with one-man Welman submarines and X-class "midget" submarines, undergoing alterations to her casing to allow her to operate with those craft. Finally, on 11 September 1943 Thrasher departed "Port HHZ" (Loch Cairnbawn) towing submarine X5 as part of Operation Source, the attempt to destroy Tirpitz, then lying at anchor in Kåfjord. Thrasher succeeded in towing X5 to her point of departure, though it is unclear how close X5 made it to her target: she was lost with all hands in the fjord during the attack. Thrasher returned to Holy Loch on 5 October 1943. Hezlet was mentioned in dispatches for his role in the operation (gazetted 11 January 1944).

In October 1943, before leaving Thrasher at Holy Loch, Hezlet was promoted to Lieutenant Commander six months early (at that time promotion to Lieutenant Commander was automatic after eight years as a Lieutenant) with eighteen months' seniority, as from 1 October 1942 (gazetted on 8 November 1943).

=== Operations in the Pacific ===
==== HMS Trenchant (P 331) ====
On 15 October 1943 Hezlet took over as Lieutenant Commander in Command of the submarine HMS Trenchant at Chatham.

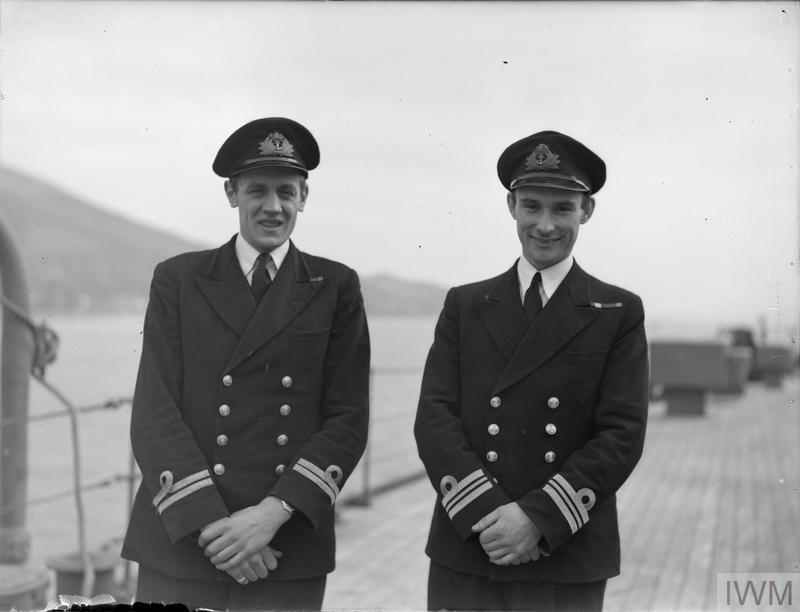
Lieut Cdr A R Hezlet, DSC, RN (right), Commanding Officer of HMS Trenchant, with his First Lieutenant, Lieut J L Watkinson, DSC, RN. 9 March 1944, Holy Loch. © IWM (A 22325)

After trials in the Clyde and nearby lochs, on 14 May 1944 Trenchant departed Holy Loch for Trincomalee, Ceylon (now Sri Lanka). Trenchant's first war patrol began on 25 July 1944 when she departed Trincomalee for the west coast of Sumatra. Her mission was partly to participate in Operation Boomerang, the USAAF's B-29 raid on oil fields and refineries at Palembang, by standing off the coast and assist in searching for and rescuing aircrew downed over the sea. Trenchant was given a special "homing device" to allow any B-29 in trouble to find her. In the event, no aircraft called for her assistance, though she was ordered to search for a downed aircraft but this proved fruitless. Trenchant was also to attack any enemy forces encountered. During the patrol she sank a Japanese coaster. Hezlet stopped to pick up survivors who were being discouraged by one of their number, an officer, from doing so. Hezlet manoeuvred Trenchant to cut the officer off from the rest of the group and eventually Trenchant managed to coax 14 Japanese to accept rescue; the others had to be left to their fate.

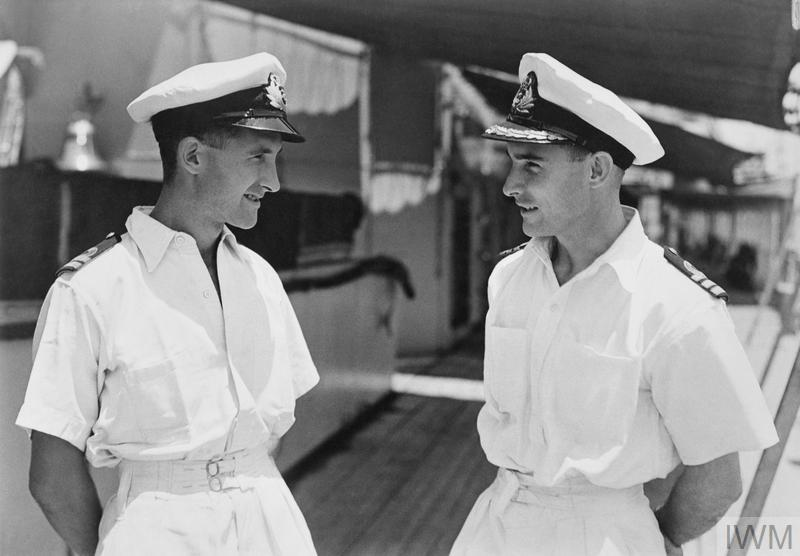
Commander A R Hezlet, DSO, DSC, RN (right) and Lieut R H Brunner, RN, Poulton-Le-Fylde, Lancs (left). 21 March 1945, Colombo, Ceylon. © IWM (A 28133)

Hezlet undertook long-range patrols in the Indian and Pacific oceans, earning him his first Distinguished Service Order (DSO). He sank the long-range German U-boat U-859, on 23 September 1944, near the Sunda Strait, whose position had been identified through 'Ultra' signals decrypts.

On 27 October 1944, Trenchant deployed two Mk II Chariot manned torpedoes 6.5 nautical miles off Phuket in Thailand on a mission to destroy two salved former Italian merchant ships in what would prove to be one of the most successful uses of Chariots of the whole War. One Chariot, codenamed "Tiny" (manned by T/S.Lt. A.W.C. Eldrige, RNVR and T/A/Petty Officer S. Woollcott) was to target the former Sumatra, while the other, codenamed "Slasher" (manned by T/Petty Officer W.S. Smith and Ordinary Seaman A.F. Brown) was to target the former Volpi. Both Chariots successfully placed the charges on their target and proceeded back out of the harbour and the crews were re-embarked aboard Trenchant. Both targets were sunk. The chariots "Tiny" and "Slasher" had to be scuttled due to the danger from a Japanese patrol boat in the vicinity.

On 8 June 1945, Hezlet took Trenchant into shallow mined water in the Banka Strait off Sumatra, to intercept Japanese heavy cruiser Ashigara. Despite being attacked by the Japanese destroyer Kamikaze, five out of eight torpedoes that he fired hit Ashigara, which quickly sank. It was the largest Japanese warship sunk by a Royal Navy warship during the war.

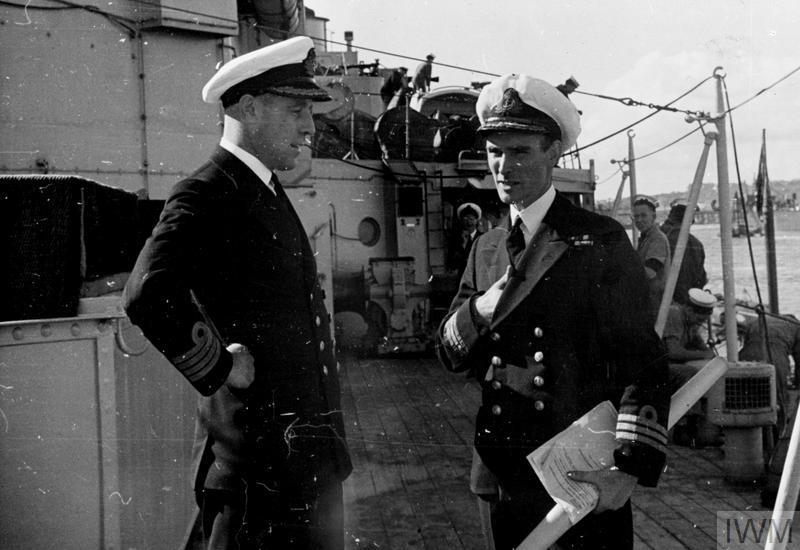
Cdr A R Hezlet, DSO and bar, DSC, RN, Commanding Officer of HMS Trenchant (right) reporting back on the Depot ship to Captain Ben Bryant, DSO and 2 bars, DSC, RN, Captain Submarines, Commanding Officer of the Flotilla. July/August 1945, Fremantle, Western Australia © IWM (A 30367)

Hezlet was ordered to Subic Bay in the Philippines, where he was awarded the U.S. Legion of Merit by U.S. Admiral James Fife, Jr. He was also awarded a Bar to his DSO.

Ordered to return to the UK, he ended the war as he began it, serving on a submarine.

== Post-war career ==
After the war, Hezlet attended naval and three-service staff colleges. In 1946, he was one of a small group of Britons permitted to observe the U.S. nuclear bomb tests at Bikini Atoll. He commanded the destroyer HMS Scorpion, and then served in the Admiralty, and as Chief Staff Officer to the Flag Officer Submarines, before taking command of the destroyer HMS Battleaxe and becoming Captain D of the 6th Destroyer Flotilla in 1955.

In 1956, Hezlet was appointed as Director of the Naval Staff College at Greenwich. After commanding the cruiser HMS Newfoundland, he became Flag Officer Submarines and was promoted to rear admiral in 1959. The submarine HMS Dreadnought, Britain's first nuclear attack submarine, was launched in early 1960.

The task of the Flag Officer Submarines was to help formulate plans for support and training facilities in a force as yet unfamiliar with nuclear propulsion. He was also in office later that year, when the preferred option for the UK's nuclear deterrent moved from the air-launched Skybolt missile to the Polaris missile launched by ballistic missile submarines. He was appointed CB in 1961.

Hezlet's final tour was Flag Officer Scotland and Northern Ireland (FOSNI). He was promoted to vice-admiral and appointed KBE before his retirement in 1964.

== Later life ==
Hezlet returned to his family home, Bovagh House, at Aghadowey, County Londonderry. He was Northern Ireland president of the Royal British Legion for 25 years. He served with the RNLI, a member of the general synod of the Church of Ireland, and was an original council member of the University of Ulster. He was a keen yachtsman, and his yacht Agivey was a familiar sight on the coasts of Ireland and Scotland. He was appointed High Sheriff of County Londonderry for 1968.

== Family & death ==
Hezlet died at Bovagh, at the age of 93, in 2007. He was survived by his wife, Annie Joan Patricia Clark, and their two daughters.

== Writings ==
In retirement, Hezlet wrote many books on naval matters. His first book, The Submarine and Sea Power (1967), foresaw the continuing invulnerability of the seaborne nuclear deterrent. In Aircraft and Sea Power (1970), he took the view that the Atlantic could be defended by land-based aircraft and submarines, with no surface vessels.

Hezlet also wrote a history of the Ulster Special Constabulary, the "B Specials", in 1972. He reviewed the use of electricity and electronics in naval warfare in The Electron and Sea Power (1976). He published a memoir, HMS Trenchant at War: from Chatham to the Banka Strait, in 2001, and his last book, the authoritative History of British and Allied Submarine Operations (2002), listed every patrol taken by an Allied submarine in the Second World War.

Military offices
Preceded by Bertram Taylor	Flag Officer Submarines; 1959–1961	Succeeded by Sir Hugh Mackenzie
Preceded by Sir Royston Wright	Flag Officer, Scotland and Northern Ireland; 1961–1964	Succeeded by Sir David Gregory
