= Greek submarine Delfin =

At least two ships of the Hellenic Navy have borne the name Delfin :

- Greek submarine Delfin (1912) a submarine launched in 1912 and scrapped in 1920.
- Greek submarine Delfin (Y-9) a V-class submarine launched as HMS Vengeful in 1944 she was renamed on transfer to Greece in 1945. She was scrapped in 1958.
