= Utile =

Utile may refer to:

== Ships ==
- Utile (1784 ship), French Royal Navy gabarre, later HMS Utile after British capture
- French ship Utile (1764), a French 56-gun Bordelois-class ship of the line
- HMS Utile, any one of several British ships

== People ==
- Pauline Lefèvre-Utile (née Utile) (1830–1922), founded the Lefèvre Utile (LU) company with husband Jean-Romain Lefèvre in 1854

== Companies ==
- Lefèvre-Utile, better known by the initials LU, a French manufacturer brand of biscuits
- Utile, French convenience stores under the umbrella of Système U

== Places ==
- Lefèvre-Utile Point (64°50′S 63°31′W), a point 1 nautical mile (2 km) west of Curie Point along the north side of Doumer Island, in the Palmer Archipelago, Antarctica

== Music ==
- Utile (album), a 1992 album by Julien Clerc
  - "Utile" (song), a song on that album

== Nature ==
- Entandrophragma utile, a large West African tree, and the timber harvested from it, commonly called Utile.
