= Upshot (disambiguation) =

An upshot is the eventual outcome of a discussion, action, or event.

Upshot or Upshots may also refer to:

- HMS Upshot, a former Royal Navy submarine
- The Upshot, website from The New York Times
- UpShot League, an American professional basketball league
