= HMS Viper =

Sixteen ships of the Royal Navy have borne the name HMS Viper, or HMS Vipere, after the members of the Viperidae family:

- HMS Viper (1746) was a 14-gun sloop launched in 1746. She was converted into a fireship in 1755 and renamed HMS Lightning. She was sold in 1762.
- HMS Viper (1756) was a 10-gun sloop launched in 1756. She was wrecked in the Gulf of Saint Lawrence in bad weather while escorting a convoy in 1779.
- HMS Viper (1777) was the Massachusetts privateer schooner Viper that HMS Perseus captured on 26 September 1776. She was purchased in 1777 and broken up in New York in 1779.
- HMS Viper (1779) was a 6-gun galley, the former South Carolina Navy's Rutledge, captured on 4 November 1779 at Tybee and listed until 1785.
- HMS Viper was a 14-gun cutter purchased in 1780 as Greyhound; in 1781 she was renamed Viper. She was sold in 1809.
- HMS Vipere (1793) was a 4-gun xebec, formerly a French privateer. She was captured in 1793, but foundered in Hyères Bay later that year during the evacuation of Toulon.
- HMS Vipere (1794) was a 16-gun brig-sloop, formerly a French privateer, which Flora captured in 1794. Vipere foundered in the estuary of the River Shannon on 2 January 1797 with the loss of her entire crew of 120 men.
- HMS Viper (1794) was a 4-gun Dutch hoy purchased in 1794 and broken up in 1802.
- HMS Viper (1807) was launched at Cowes in 1805 as the mercantile schooner Princess Charlotte. The Royal Navy purchased her in 1807. The 4-gun schooner disappeared in February 1809 while sailing from Cadiz to Gibraltar and was presumed to have foundered with all hands.
- HMS Viper (1809) was an 8-gun cutter launched in 1809 as the civilian vessel Niger. She was purchased that same year and sold in 1814.
- HMS Viper (1810) was a 10-gun gun-brig purchased in 1810. She was possibly renamed Mohawk later that year, and is not present on the navy list of 1811.
- HMS Viper - tender to Ramillies, c. 1820-21.
- HMS Viper (1831) was a 6-gun schooner launched in 1831 and broken up in 1851.
- HMS Viper (1854) was an Arrow-class wooden-hulled screw gunvessel launched in 1854 and sold in 1862.
- HMS Viper (1865) was an iron armoured gunvessel launched in 1865. She was used for harbour service from 1890, as a tank vessel from 1901 and was sold in 1908.
- HMS Viper (1899) was a Viper-class destroyer launched in 1899 and wrecked in 1901.

== Other vessels ==
HM Customs and Excise and the Bombay Marine, the naval arm of the East India Company, also had cutters or other vessels named Viper.
