= HMS Virulent =

HMS Virulent may refer to:

- HMS Virulent was an Admiralty modified W-class destroyer ordered in 1918 but subsequently cancelled
- HMS Virulent (P95) was a V-class submarine launched in 1944. She was transferred to Greece in 1946 as Argonaftis and returned in 1958, being scrapped in 1961
