= State capacity =

A government's ability to do things

State capacity is the ability of a government to accomplish policy goals, either generally or in reference to specific aims. More narrowly, state capacity often refers to the ability of a state to collect taxes, enforce law and order, and provide services to the public.

A state that lacks capacity is defined as a fragile state or, in a more extreme case, a failed state. Higher state capacity has been strongly linked to long-term economic development, as state capacity can establish law and order, private property rights, and external defense, as well as support development by establishing a competitive market, transportation infrastructure, and mass education.

== Definitions and measurement ==
There are multiple dimensions of state capacity, as well as varied indicators of state capacity. In studies that use state capacity as a causal variable, it has frequently been measured as the ability to tax, provide public goods, enforce property rights, achieve economic growth or hold a monopoly on the use of force within a territory.

State capacity is distinct from political control, as the latter refers to the tactics that states use to gain compliance from society.

Based on a myriad of typologies proposed by authors and scholars in the social sciences field (including, but not limited to, Weber, Bourdieu and Mann), Centeno et al. advance that it is possible to break down the concept of "state capacity" into four different types or categories as shown below:

1. Territorial: it is related to the traditional Weberian concept of monopoly over the means of violence and makes us think of the state as a disciplinary body. This type of state authority or capability is purportedly the simplest to exercise because all that is needed to impose the desired order is the acquisition and use of a sufficient amount of relative coercive force. This power is wielded in two different fronts: firstly, vis a vis other states defining sovereignty and secondly, against internal or domestic opposition.
2. Economic: it entails two distinct but frequently related processes. First, this is about the state guaranteeing the society's general prosperity by consolidating an economic space through the development of a national market alongside the physical and legal infrastructure necessary to support the integration of that domestic economy into a global system of exchange. The ability to direct and appropriate resources through the creation of a productive fiscal system is the second facet of the economic capacity.
3. Infrastructural: it refers to the ability to process information, create organisational structures, and maintain transportation and communication systems.
4. Symbolic: although of much more ambiguous nature than the other categories, it is defined as the monopoly over the judgment of truth claims. In other words, this category is linked to the state capacity to transform what are diffuse social rituals and practices of conformity to authority into an objectified and bureaucratic process.

The United Nations Research Institute for Social Development (UNRISD) determined that basic state capacities are to

1. Assist in the acquisition of new technologies
2. Mobilize and channel resources to productive sectors
3. Enforce standards and regulations
4. Establish social pacts
5. Fund deliver and regulate services and social programmes

States must be able to create the

1. Political Capacity to address the extent to which the necessary coalitions or political settlements can be built
2. Resource Mobilization Capacity to generate resources for investment and social development
3. Allocate Resources To Productive And Welfare-Enhancing Sectors

State capacity can be measured by indexes such as the government effectiveness index and government competitiveness index.

== State formation ==
State capacity may involve an expansion of the state's information-gathering abilities. In processes of state-building, states began implementing a regular and reliable census, the regular release of statistical yearbooks, and civil and population registers, as well as establishing a government agency tasked with processing statistical information.

Mark Dincecco distinguishes between state capacity (the state's ability to accomplish its intended actions) and "effective statehood" (the political arrangements that enable the state to best accomplish its intended actions). He argues that fiscal centralization and institutional impartiality are key to effective statehood.

== Risk factor for violence ==
The risk of civil war increases when relational state capacity is low, meaning the state has less control over its subjects than outsiders, or challengers to its domain (the monopoly of violence). The political majority is more likely to instigate a genocide when threatened with state failure. States with strong social control can enforce their own policies and deter membership in alternate rebel organizations. In some parts of the world, like Africa, some ethnic groups may be more distant from the capital but have a high level of internal connectedness. This type of scenario may reduce central social control, presenting an elevated risk of civil conflict and armed violence in Africa. Many scholars have argued that the lack of social control in Africa is a risk factor for violence.

== See also ==
- Capacity-building
- Enforcement
- State (polity)
- State formation
- State building
- War
- Welfare
