= Umpire (disambiguation) =

An umpire is a person of authority in a number of sports games.

Specific sports umpires include:

- Umpire (American football)
- Umpire (Australian rules football)
- Umpire (baseball)
- Umpire (cricket)
- Umpire (field hockey)
- International Umpire of Sailing
- Referee in other sports

Umpire may also refer to:

In geography:

- Umpire, Arkansas
- Umpire, Missouri

In military:

- HMS Umpire, name of several Royal Navy ships

In law:

- Umpire (law), a decision-maker or chairperson in an arbitration tribunal
- Crown Umpire, the chief arbitrator under the British National Insurance Act 1911
