= Vehement =

Vehement may refer to:

- The pronunciation of VHEMT, which is the Voluntary Human Extinction Movement
- HMS Vehement, the name of more than one ship of the British Royal Navy
