= Usk (disambiguation) =

Usk is a Welsh town.

Usk or USK may also refer to:

== Places ==
=== In Wales ===
- River Usk
- Usk Castle
- Usk Reservoir
- Usk Hundred, an ancient administrative division
- HM Prison Usk

=== Elsewhere ===
- Usk, British Columbia, Canada, a hamlet
- Usk, County Kildare, Ireland, a civil parish
- Usk, Washington, United States, an unincorporated community
- Una-Sana Canton (Unsko-sanski kanton), a canton of the Federation of Bosnia and Herzegovina

== Transportation ==
- Usk railway station (Great Western Railway), Monmouthshire, Wales
- Usk station (British Columbia), Canada
- Usinsk Airport (IATA: USK), in northern Russia

== Military ==
- Battle of Pwll Melyn or Battle of Usk in 1405, part of the Welsh War of Independence
- HMS Usk, several Royal Navy vessels
- US-K, a series of Russian, previously Soviet, military early warning satellites

== Other uses ==
- Thomas Usk (died 1388), under-sheriff of London
- Unterhaltungssoftware Selbstkontrolle (USK), Germany's computer game rating agency
- University of Saint Katherine (USK), a now-defunct college in San Marcos, California

== See also ==
- Uskside (disambiguation)
