= List of ships named HMS Victory =

Six ships of the Royal Navy have been named HMS Victory:

- English ship Victory (1569), a 42-gun ship, originally named Great Christopher, purchased by the Royal Navy in 1569 and commanded by Sir John Hawkins during 1588 battle against the Spanish Armada and broken up in 1608. The ship was rebuilt as the larger Prince Royal by Phineas Pett for Prince Henry.
- English ship Victory (1620), a 42-gun great ship launched at Deptford in 1620. She was rebuilt in 1666 as an 82-gun second-rate ship of the line and broken up in 1691.
- HMS Victory (1695), a 100-gun first-rate ship of the line launched in 1675 as Royal James, renamed 7 March 1691. Great repair 1694-1695. Burnt by accident in February 1721.
- HMS Victory (1737), a 100-gun first-rate ship of the line launched in 1737. She was wrecked in 1744 in the Western Approaches to the English Channel, and found again in 2008.
- HMS Victory (1764), an 8-gun schooner launched in 1764. She served in Canada and was burned in 1768.
- HMS Victory, a 100-gun first-rate ship of the line launched in 1765, one of the most famous warships ever launched. She served in the American War of Independence, the French Revolutionary Wars and the Napoleonic Wars. She was Keppel's flagship at Ushant, Jervis's flagship at Cape St Vincent and Nelson's flagship at Trafalgar. She served as a harbour ship after 1824 and was moved to a dry dock at Portsmouth in 1922, where she has been the flagship of the Second Sea Lord (until 2012) and the First Sea Lord (presently), and is preserved as a museum ship.
- HMS Victory IV – the designation for the Royal Naval Division during the First World War.

== See also ==
- HMS Victor
- HMS Victoria
- HMS Victorious
- USS Victory
- Victory (disambiguation)
- French ship Victoire
