= Vectis =

Vectis may refer to:

== Places ==
- Vectis, the ancient Roman name for the Isle of Wight

== Organisations ==
- Vectis Bus Company, the forerunner of present day Isle of Wight bus company Southern Vectis, set up in the early 1920s.
- Vectis postal service, a postal service set up to serve the Isle of Wight during the postal strikes of 1971.
- The Vectis National Party, a minor political party operating on the Isle of Wight in the early 1970s.
- The Vectis Tigers, an English ice hockey team on the Isle of Wight founded in 2007, now known as the Wightlink Tigers.
- Vectis Radio, a radio station launched in 2010 by former Isle of Wight Radio DJ Ian Mac.

== Other uses ==
- The Vectis Formation, an Early Cretaceous fossil-bearing geological formation on the Isle of Wight
- HMS Vectis (disambiguation), a name used more than once by the British Royal Navy
- Calipt'Air Vectis, a Swiss paraglider design
- Vectis forceps (Single bladed Caesarean forceps)
- Minolta Vectis S series，film SLR cameras made by Minolta
- Vectis, a stealthy Collaborative Combat Aircraft by Lockheed Martin
- British Rail Classes 485 and 486, trains for the Isle of Wight named 4Vec and 3Tis under the Southern Railway classification.
