= Whelp =

Whelp may refer to:

- Whelping, the birthing of carnivorous mammals
  - any young, carnivorous mammal; most commonly a puppy
- Whelp (tidal bore) in an undular bore: the train of secondary waves behind the bore front
- HMS Whelp: the name of one ship of the Royal Navy and of another which was planned but cancelled
