= Wessex (disambiguation) =

Wessex was an Anglo-Saxon kingdom in early medieval England.

Wessex or West Saxon may also refer to:

- Thomas Hardy's Wessex, a semi-fictional region of England in the novels of Thomas Hardy
- West Saxon dialect, the Germanic dialect spoken by the West Saxons following Anglo-Saxon settlement
- Wessex culture, a name given to the predominant prehistoric culture of southern Britain during the early Bronze Age
- Wessex (European Parliament constituency), a former constituency covering Dorset and part of Hampshire and Wiltshire
- Wessex, Ontario, Canada, a fictitious city in the Canadian sitcom Dan for Mayor
- Wessex, a community that is a part of Morningside Place in Houston
- HMS Wessex, the name of more than one ship of the British Royal Navy
- Wessex (ward), a former electoral ward in Somerset, England
- Earl of Wessex, an English title of nobility
- Westland Wessex, a helicopter
