= P72 =

P72 may refer to:

- De Tomaso P72, an Italian sports car
- HMS Vampire (P72), a submarine of the Royal Navy
- Papyrus 72, an early New Testament papyrus
- ThinkPad P72, a laptop
- Republic XP-72, an American fighter aircraft
- P72, a state regional road in Latvia
