= R95 =

R95 may refer to:

- French aircraft carrier Arromanches
- HMS Zenith (R95), a destroyer of the Royal Navy
- R95, a NIOSH air filtration rating
