= Ulster (disambiguation) =

Ulster is one of the four provinces of Ireland.

Ulster may also refer to:

== Places ==
- New Ulster Province, a province of New Zealand from 1841 to 1853
- Northern Ireland, a part of the United Kingdom formed in 1921 from six of the nine counties that made up the Irish province of Ulster at that time
- Ulster County, New York, United States
  - Ulster, New York, a town in the County
- Ulster Township, Floyd County, Iowa, United States
- Ulster Township, Pennsylvania, United States

== Transport ==
- HMS Ulster, the name of two ships of the Royal Navy
- Ulster and Delaware Railroad, also known as "the Ulster", serving New York's Ulster County and neighboring Delaware County
- a sports car variant of the Austin 7

== Other ==
- History Hub Ulster, a history organization in Northern Ireland
- Ulster (river), central Germany
- UTV (TV channel), previously known as Ulster Television or Ulster on air
- BBC Radio Ulster, a Northern Irish radio station from the BBC
- Ulster coat, a long, loose overcoat made of rough material
- "Ulster Covenant", a poem (also referred to as "Ulster 1912") written in 1912 by Rudyard Kipling
- Ulster Derby, flat horse race in Northern Ireland
- Ulster F.C., a defunct football club
- Ulster Grand National, a National Hunt steeplechase in Northern Ireland
- Ulster Grand Prix, motorcycle race in Northern Ireland
- Ulster Hospital, a large hospital in Dundonald, east of Belfast
- Ulster nationalism, a movement that seeks the independence of Northern Ireland from the United Kingdom
- Ulster Reform Club, a private members club in Belfast, Northern Ireland
- Ulster Rugby, a branch of the Irish Rugby Football Union and also the professional rugby team operated by this body
