= Uskside =

Uskside may refer to:

- Along the River Usk in Wales
- Uskside, a cargo ship, launched as Empire Warner
- Uskside Foundry, a former foundry in Newport, Wales

== See also ==
- Usk (disambiguation)
