= HMS Wolf =

Sixteen ships of the Royal Navy have borne the name HMS Wolf or HMS Woolf, after the mammal the wolf:

- HMS Woolf (1656) was a 16-gun ship, previously the Spanish Lobos. She was captured in 1656 and sold in 1663.
- HMS Woolf (1690) was an 8-gun fireship launched in 1690 and expended in 1692, destroying the French Le Triomphant
- HMS Woolf (1699) was a 2-gun sloop launched in 1699. She was captured by the French in 1704 but was recovered in 1708 and sold in 1712.
- HMS Wolf (1731) was a 14-gun sloop launched in 1731 and wrecked in 1741.
- HMS Wolf (1742) was a 14-gun sloop launched in 1742, captured by the French in 1745, recaptured in 1747 and wrecked in 1748.
- HMS Wolf (1754) was a 10-gun sloop launched in 1754 and sold in 1781.
- HMS Wolf (1780) was an 8-gun armed ship of unknown origin, wrecked in 1780.
- HMS Wolf (1794) was a 4-gun gunvessel, originally a Dutch hoy purchased in 1794. She was broken up in 1803.
- HMS Wolf was a 16-gun sloop, originally the 18-gun French privateer Eugénie. HMS Magnanime captured her in 1798 and the Royal Navy commissioned Eugénie as HMS Pandour. She was renamed HMS Wolf in 1800 and broken up in 1802.
- HMS Wolf (1801) was a cutter tender launched in 1801 and broken up in 1829.
- HMS Wolf (1804) was a 16-gun Merlin-class sloop launched at Dartmouth in 1804. She captured or destroyed four small Spanish or French privateers before she was wrecked on 4 September 1806, with no loss of life, about 1.5 miles off shore on the southwest point of Heneaga in the Bahamas. The loss was blamed on a northward current and inaccurate charts.
- HMS Wolf was the French 16-gun brig-sloop Diligent, which HMS Renard captured in 1806. The Royal Navy commissioned her as HMS Diligent. She was renamed HMS Prudente later that year and HMS Wolf in 1807. She was broken up in 1811.
- HMS Wolf (1814) was a 14-gun brig-sloop launched in 1814 and sold as a training ship in 1825.
- HMS Wolf (1826) was an 18-gun sloop launched in 1826, hulked in 1848, used as a coal hulk from 1859 and broken up by 1878.
- HMS Wolf (1856) was an Albacore-class wooden screw gunboat launched in 1856 and broken up by 1864.
- HMS Wolf (1897) was an Earnest-class destroyer launched in 1897, reclassified as a B-class destroyer in 1913 and sold in 1921.

== See also ==
- HMS Wolfe
- HMCS Wolf
- HMS Wolfhound
