= HMS Victor =

Seven ships of the Royal Navy have borne the name HMS Victor:

- HMS Victor (1777) was a 10-gun brig-sloop purchased in 1777. She foundered in 1780.
- HMS Victor (1779) was the 14-gun American privateer sloop Hunter that the Royal Navy captured in Penobscot Bay in 1779; she disappeared with all hands in the Great Hurricane of San Domingo on 5 October 1780.
- HMS Victor (1798) was an 18-gun Cruizer-class brig-sloop launched in 1798 and paid off in 1808 to be sold. Because Victor served in the navy's Egyptian campaign (8 March to 2 September 1801), her officers and crew qualified for the clasp "Egypt" to the Naval General Service Medal, which the Admiralty issued in 1847 to all surviving claimants.
- HMS Victor (1808) was an 18-gun brig-sloop, formerly the privateer Revenant of Robert Surcouf, and French corvette Iéna. She was captured in 1808, recaptured by the French in 1809, retaken by the British in 1810 and broken up.
- HMS Victor (1814) was an 18-gun Cruizer-class brig-sloop launched in 1814. She foundered in 1842.
- HMS Victor (1855) was a wooden screw gunvessel launched in 1855. She was sold in 1863 as the civilian Scylla; the Confederate Navy repurchased her as CSS Rappahannock.
- HMS Victor (1913) was an Acasta-class destroyer launched in 1913 and sold in 1923.

== See also ==
- HMS Victor Emmanuel
- HMS Victoria
- HMS Victorious
- List of ships named HMS Victory
- List of ships named HMY Victoria and Albert
- Victor (disambiguation)
