= Welfare =

Welfare may refer to:

== Philosophy ==
- Well-being (happiness, prosperity, or flourishing) of a person or group
- Utility in utilitarianism
- Value in value theory

== Economics ==
- Utility, a general term for individual well-being in economics and decision theory
  - Decision utilities, utilities as revealed by human behavior under the assumption of rationality
  - Economic surplus, the total economic benefit or gains from trade provided for society
- Social welfare function, a function that aggregates individual welfares to create an overall social welfare
  - Social choice theory, the study of welfare aggregation
- Welfare economics, the study of social well-being

=== Government-run public aid ===
- Welfare spending, government intervention meant to provide a minimal level of well-being and social support for all citizens
- Welfare state, the concept of a government playing a key role in individual economic and social well-being

== People ==
- Henry Welfare, (1888-1966) English footballer
- Michael Welfare (Wohlfahrt), (1687-1741) American religious leader
- Sue Welfare, (born 1963) English writer

== Other uses ==
- Welfare (film), a 1975 film by Frederick Wiseman
- HMS Welfare, the name of two ships of the Royal Navy, and one planned ship

== See also ==
- Animal welfare, the quality of life or well-being of animals
- Corporate welfare, term describing the bestowal of benefits upon corporations by government
- Welfare fraud, intentional misuse of welfare programs by providing false information
- Welfare queen, a pejorative term for a person accused of collecting excess welfare payments
