= Zenobia (ship) =

Numerous vessels in the 19th & 20th centuries have been named Zenobia for Zenobia, the Queen (c. 240–272 CE) of the Palmyrene Empire who conquered Egypt:

== Merchant vessels ==
- Zenobia (1815 ship), a British merchant ship that sailed out of Calcutta, India
- Zenobia (1837 ship), carried ice from Alaska to San Francisco
- Zenobia (1868 ship), a British merchant ship lost at sea while carrying coal from Newport
- MS Zenobia, a ferry that sank on her maiden voyage on 7 June 1980
- Queen Zenobia (tanker) (IMO: 9256535, MMSI: 636091047), a Liberian-flagged LPG tanker built in 2002

== Naval vessels ==
- HMS Zenobia, several British Navy ships
- USS Zenobia (AKA-52), a US Navy attack cargo ship
