= HMS Wave =

Five ships of the Royal Navy have borne the name HMS Wave:

- HMS Wave (1856) an Albacore-class wooden screw gunboat launched in 1856, renamed Clinker in 1882 and sold in 1890
- HMS Wave (1882) a tender purchased in 1882 and sold in 1907
- HMS Wave (1914) a despatch vessel purchased in 1914, renamed Wayward in 1919 and foundered under tow in 1922
- HMS Wave a W-class destroyer cancelled in 1918
- HMS Wave (J385) an Algerine-class minesweeper launched in 1944 and scrapped in 1962

== Non-commissioned craft ==
- Dockyard tug Wave, launched by Taikoo Dockyard, Hong Kong on 18 January 1939. 300 t displacement, 120 by 24.5 feet (36.6 m × 7.5 m), and also described as a dockyard tanker. Renamed Wavelet in 1947 and sold 10 June 1958.
