= HMS Vox =

Two submarines of the Royal Navy have borne the name HMS Vox, after the Latin for Voice:

- HMS Vox (P67), a British U-class submarine launched in 1943, that upon completion was transferred to the Free French Navy as the French submarine Curie. She was returned to the Royal Navy in 1946, and scrapped in 1949.
- HMS Vox (P73) - a British V-class submarine launched in 1943 and scrapped in 1946.
