= HMS Venom =

HMS Venom has been the name of more than one ship of the British Royal Navy, and may refer to:

- HMS Venom (1794), a vessel captured from the French in 1794 and in service until at least 1799 as a gun-brig
- HMS Venom, the original name of the destroyer HMS Venomous (D75), renamed while under construction, launched in 1919, and sold for scrapping in 1947
- HMS Venom (P27), a V-class submarine whose construction was cancelled in 1944
