= HMS Zenith =

HMS Zenith has been the name of more than one ship of the British Royal Navy, and may refer to:

- Zenith, a drifter considered for service but acquisition cancelled in 1919
- HMS Wessex (R78), originally named HMS Zenith but renamed in January 1943 prior to completion, a destroyer in commission from 1944 to 1946
- HMS Zenith (R95), originally named HMS Wessex but renamed in January 1943 prior to completion, a destroyer in commission from 1944 to 1947

The name "HMS Zenith" also was given to a shore establishment, the Royal Naval Volunteer Reserve Division at Southampton, England, in 1946.
