= French ship Victoire =

Twenty-two ships of the French Navy have borne the name Victoire ("Victory"):

== Ships named Victoire ==
- Victoire (1638), a 34-gun ship of the line.
- Victoire (1657), a 30-gun ship of the line.
- Victoire (1664), a galley.
- Arrogant (1671), a 28-gun ship of the line, bore the name Victoire early in her career.
- Victoire (1674), a galley.
- Victoire (1681), a galley.
- Victoire (1682), Fière, a galley, bore the name Victoire during her career.
- Victoire (1691), a galley.
- Victoire (1704), a 26-gun frigate.
- Victoire (1757), a 40-gun frigate.
- Victoire (1770), a 74-gun ship of the line.
- Languedoc (1766), an 80-gun ship of the line, bore the name Victoire late in her career.
- Victoire (1979), a fluyt.
- Victoire (1797), the captured Venetian ship Vittoria.
- Victoire (1798), a gunboat, that the British captured on 8 March 1801 on the Nile
- Victoire (1798), a captured Papal galley.
- Victoire (1799), an aviso.
- Duchesse du Berry (1816), a 46-gun frigate, bore the name Victoire during her career.
- Victoire (1830), a fluyt .
- Victoire (1861), a sail and steam frigate.
- Victoire (1910), a tugboat.
- Victoire (1949), a tugboat.

== Ships with similar names ==
- French ship Victor
- French ship Victorieux
- French ship Victorieuse
- Victory (1813), ship in French service under Ensign Durbec, captured by the British at Cassis on 18 August 1813.
- Chasseur, a 4-gun ship, bore the name Victoire du grand Cincinnatus during her career.
- Victoire III (1917), a tugboat.

== See also ==
- List of ships named HMS Victory
- USS Victory
