= HMS Varne =

Two ships of the Royal Navy have borne the name HMS Varne:

- HMS Varne (P66) was a U-class submarine launched in 1943. She was transferred to the Royal Norwegian Navy later that year as HNoMS Ula, and was scrapped in 1965.
- HMS Varne (P81) was a V-class submarine launched in 1944 and handed over for breaking up in 1948.
