= HMS Wrenn =

Two ships of the Royal Navy have been named HMS Wrenn.

- HMS Wrenn (1653), a 12-gun ship, captured in 1653 and sold on 29 September 1657.
- HMS Wrenn (1694), a 10-gun pink, 103 tons, launched on 21 March 1694 and captured by the French Navy off Rye on 28 March 1697.

== See also ==
- HMS Wren
