= HMS Viper (1794) =

History

Great Britain
- Name: HMS Viper
- Acquired: 1794 (by purchase)
- Fate: Broken up 1801

General characteristics
- Type: Hoy
- Tons burthen: 69 (bm)
- Length: 65 ft 5 in (19.9 m) (overall); 57 ft 9 in (17.6 m) (keel)
- Beam: 15 ft 0 in (4.6 m)
- Depth of hold: 6 ft 6 in (2.0 m)
- Propulsion: Sails
- Sail plan: sloop
- Complement: 30
- Armament: 1 × 24-pounder gun + 3 × 32-pounder carronades

HMS Viper was a Dutch hoy that the Admiralty purchased in 1794. She was commissioned into the Royal Navy in March 1794 under Lieutenant John W. Skinner, for the Nore. At some point in 1796 Viper was under the command of Lieutenant R. Wilson. In March 1796, the Navy lent Viper to the Transport Board. The Navy recommissioned Viper in September under Lieutenant William Stagg, who commanded her until 1801. In 1801 she was broken up at Portsmouth.
