= HMS Urgent =

Three ships of the Royal Navy have borne the name HMS Urgent:

- HMS Urgent (1804) was a 12-gun gun-brig launched in 1804 and sold in 1816.
- HMS Urgent (1837) was a wooden paddle packet, previously the General Post Office ship Colonsay. She was transferred to the Navy in 1837 and sold in 1850.
- HMS Urgent (1855) was an iron screw troopship, purchased on the stocks as Assaye. She was launched in 1855, converted to a depot ship in 1876, and was sold in 1903.
