= HMS Woodpecker =

HMS Woodpecker may refer to:

- HMS Woodpecker a Modified W-class destroyer cancelled before laying down in 1918
- HMS Woodpecker (U08) a Black Swan-class sloop launched in 1942 and sunk in 1944
