= HMS Ursa =

Two ships of the Royal Navy have borne the name HMS Ursa, after the Latin for bear:

- HMS Ursa (1917) was a modified R-class destroyer launched in 1917 and sold in 1926.
- HMS Ursa (R22) was a U-class destroyer launched in 1943. She was converted into a Type 15 fast anti-submarine frigate between 1953 and 1955, and was sold in 1967.
