= HMS Undine =

Eight ships of the Royal Navy have borne the name HMS Undine, after the Ondines of mythology:

- HMS Undine (1847) was an iron paddle packet purchased in 1847 and sold in 1854.
- HMS Undine (1861) was to have been a Philomel-class gunvessel. She was laid down in 1861 but was canceled in 1863.
- HMS Undine (1881) was a schooner, previously in civilian service as Morna. She was purchased in 1881 and was sold in 1888.
- HMS Undine (1904) was a coast guard vessel, previously named HMS Hawk. She was renamed HMS Undine in 1904 and was sold in 1906.
- HMS Undine (1907) was a base ship, previously named HMS Wildfire. She had been launched in 1884 for civilian service, at first as Hiawatha and then as Mizeppa. She was purchased by the Navy in 1888 as a screw yacht tender and renamed HMS Wildfire. She was converted to a base ship in 1889 and was renamed HMS Undine in 1907, before being sold in 1912.
- HMS Undine (1917) was an R-class destroyer launched in 1917 and sold in 1928. She was then wrecked later that year and the wreck sold for breaking up.
- HMS Undine (N48) was a U-class submarine launched in 1937 and sunk in 1940.
- HMS Undine (R42) was a U-class destroyer launched in 1943. She was converted into a Type 15 frigate between 1952 and 1954 and was broken up in 1965.
