= HMS Victoria =

Four vessels of the British Royal Navy have been named HMS Victoria in honour of Queen Victoria:

- HMS Victoria (1839), a wooden paddle sloop launched in India in 1839 and sold in about 1864
- HMS Victoria (1859), a first rate screw ship broken up in 1893
- HMS Victoria (1864), a Coast Guard yawl, sold in 1905
- HMS Victoria (1887), a Victoria-class battleship sunk in a collision with HMS Camperdown in 1893 in the Mediterranean with the loss of 358 lives.

== See also ==
- HMCS Victoria, a submarine
- HMS Victor
- HMS Victorious
- HMS Victory
- HMVS Victoria, two ships of the colonial navy of Victoria, Australia
- List of ships named HMY Victoria and Albert, three Royal Yachts
- MV Victoria (1959) also known as RMS Victoria
- Victoria (disambiguation)
