= HMS Walney =

Two ships of the Royal Navy have been named HMS Walney after Walney Island off the coast of Barrow-in-Furness, Cumbria:

- HMS Walney (Y04) was a Banff-class sloop launched in 1930 as USCGC Sebago. She was transferred to the Royal Navy in 1941 and was lost in 1942.
- HMS Walney (M104) is a Sandown-class minehunter, launched in 1991, decommissioned in 2010.
