= HMS Unity =

Eleven ships of the Royal Navy have borne the name HMS Unity or HMS Unite:

- HMS Unity (1665) was a 32-gun ship, previously the Dutch ship Eendracht. She was captured in 1665 but was recaptured in 1667.
- HMS Unity (1672) was a 4-gun flyboat captured from the Dutch in 1672 and given away that year.
- HMS Unity (1688) was a 6-gun fireship purchased in 1688, rebuilt in 1707 as a hoy and sold in 1773.
- HMS Unity II (1693) was a 4-gun hoy launched in 1693 and sold in 1713.
- HMS Unity III (1693) was a 4-gun hoy launched in 1693 and sold in 1713.
- HMS Unity (1728) was a hoy launched in 1728 and sold in 1788.
- HMS Unity (1788) was a store vessel launched in 1788 and broken up in 1878 as YC 3.
- HMS Unite was the 38-gun fifth rate Gracieuse, and later Unité, captured from the French in 1796 by HMS Révolutionnaire and sold in 1802.
- HMS Unite was a 40-gun fifth rate captured from the French in 1793. She was taken into service as HMS Imperieuse and was renamed HMS Unite in 1803. She was on harbour service from 1832 and was broken up in 1858.
- HMS Unity (1913) was an Acasta-class destroyer launched in 1913 and sold in 1922.
- HMS Unity (N66) was a U-class submarine launched in 1938 and sunk in a collision with SS Atle Jarl in 1940.

== See also ==
- HMS United
