= HMS Worthing =

Two ships of the Royal Navy have been named HMS Worthing:

- HMS Worthing (1939), requisitioned in 1939, renamed Brigadier in 1940 and returned to owners in 1946.
- HMS Worthing (J72), a Bangor-class minesweeper launched in 1941 and sold in 1948.
