= HMS Vernon =

Two ships and a training establishment of the Royal Navy have borne the name HMS Vernon, possibly after Admiral Edward Vernon:

- HMS Vernon (1781) was a 14-gun armed ship listed between 1781 and 1782.
- HMS Vernon (1832) was a 50-gun fourth rate launched in 1832. She became tender to the Navy's gunnery school HMS Excellent, and then the torpedo school ship in 1876. She was renamed HMS Actaeon in 1886 and sold in 1923.
- HMS Vernon (shore establishment) was the torpedo school established in 1876. She remained in commission until 1996, using a number of different hulked ships as her home until she moved ashore in 1923. Ships that have been named Vernon whilst part of the school include:
  - HMS Ariadne (1859) was jointly commissioned as Vernon with the original Vernon in 1876 and was used until 1886.
  - HMS Donegal (1858) was Vernon from 1886.
  - HMS Marlborough (1855) was Vernon II from 1895.
  - HMS Warrior (1860) was Vernon III from 1904.
  - HMS Actaeon (the original HMS Vernon (1832)) was renamed Vernon IV in 1904.
  - HM Trawler Strathcoe was Vernon from January 1934 until November 1938.
  - HMS Skylark (1932) a minelaying tender, was renamed Vernon in 1938.
