= HMS Venerable =

Four ships of the British Royal Navy have been named HMS Venerable:

- The first HMS Venerable (1784), launched in 1784, was a 74-gun third rate. She was Admiral Adam Duncan's flagship at the Battle of Camperdown and was wrecked in 1804.
- The second HMS Venerable (1808), launched in 1808, was also a 74-gun third rate, on harbour service from 1825, and broken up in 1838.
- The third HMS Venerable (1899), launched in 1899, was a Formidable-class battleship, sold in 1920.
- The fourth HMS Venerable (R63), launched in 1943, was a Colossus-class aircraft carrier. She was sold to the Royal Netherlands Navy in 1948 and renamed HNLMS Karel Doorman, and later sold to the Argentine Navy and renamed ARA Veinticinco de Mayo.
