= HMS Woolwich =

Ten ships of the Royal Navy have borne the name HMS Woolwich, after the port town and naval base of Woolwich. An eleventh was planned but entered service under a different name.

- HMS Woolwich (1673) was a 4-gun sloop launched in 1673 and wrecked in 1675.
- HMS Woolwich (1675) was a 54-gun fourth rate launched in 1675, rebuilt in 1702 and 1741, and broken up in 1747.
- HMS Woolwich (1725) was a 2-gun hoy launched in 1725 and sold in 1767
- HMS Woolwich (1749) was a 44-gun fifth rate launched in 1749 and sold in 1762.
- HMS Woolwich (1755) was a storeship launched in 1755 and listed until 1760. She may have been a rebuild of an earlier ship named Woolwich Transport.
- HMS Woolwich (1785) was a 44-gun fifth rate launched in 1785. She was used as a storeship by 1794 and was wrecked in 1813.
- HMS Woolwich (1788) was a 6-gun tender purchased in 1788 and sold in 1808.
- HMS Woolwich was to have been a storeship. She was launched instead as HMS Portsmouth in 1811.
- HMS Woolwich (1815) was a store lighter launched in 1815. She was renamed HMS Port Royal in 1818. Her fate is unknown.
- HMS Woolwich (1912) was a depot ship launched in 1912 and sold in 1926.
- HMS Woolwich (F80) was a destroyer tender and depot ship launched in 1934 and sold for scrapping in 1962.

== See also ==
- HMS Woolwich Transport
