= HMS Wrangler =

Five ships of the Royal Navy have borne the name HMS Wrangler. A sixth was planned but never completed:

- HMS Wrangler (1797) was a 12-gun gunvessel, previously the civilian craft Fortune. She was purchased in 1797 and sold in 1802.
- HMS Wrangler (1805) was a 12-gun gun-brig launched in 1805 and sold in 1815.
- HMS Wrangler (1854) was an Arrow-class wooden screw gunvessel launched in 1854 and broken up in 1866.
- HMS Wrangler (1880) was a Banterer-class composite screw gunboat launched in 1880. She was transferred to the Coastguard in 1891 and became a boom defence vessel in 1903. She was sold in 1919.
- HMS Wrangler was to have been a W-class destroyer. She was laid down in 1919 but was cancelled later that year.
- HMS Wrangler (R48) was a W-class destroyer launched in 1943. She was converted into a Type 15 frigate between 1951 and 1952. She was transferred to the South African Navy in 1956 and renamed SAS Vrystaat, and was sunk as a target in 1976.
