= HMS Weymouth =

Seven ships of the Royal Navy have borne the name Weymouth, after the English town of Weymouth, whilst another two were planned:

- English ship Weymouth (1645), a 14-gun ship, formerly the Royalist vessel Cavendish. She was captured in 1645 by the Parliamentarians, and was sold in 1662.
- HMS Weymouth (1693), a 48-gun fourth rate launched in 1693. She was rebuilt in 1718 and was broken up in 1732.
- HMS Weymouth (1736), a 60-gun fourth rate launched in 1736 and wrecked in 1745.
- HMS Weymouth (1752), a 60-gun fourth rate launched in 1752 and broken up in 1772.
- HMS Weymouth (1795), a 56-gun fourth rate, previously the East Indiaman Earl Mansfield. She was purchased on the stocks and launched in 1795 but never commissioned in the Royal Navy. She was transferred to the Transportation Board in 1796. She wrecked on 21 January 1800 on the Lisbon Bar.
- HMS Weymouth (1804), a 36-gun fifth rate, previously the East Indiaman Wellesley. She was purchased in 1804, and by 1811 had been converted into a 16-gun storeship. She was used as a convict ship from 1828 and was sold in 1865.
- HMS Weymouth was to have been a wood screw corvette. She was laid down in 1860 but was cancelled in 1863.
- HMS Weymouth (1910), a Town-class light cruiser launched in 1910 and sold in 1928.
- HMS Weymouth was a proposed name for a Rothesay-class frigate. Ultimately, this hull was cancelled and reordered as the Leander-class frigate HMS Leander.
