= HMS Yeoman =

HMS Yeoman has been the name of more than one ship of the British Royal Navy, and may refer to:

- HMS Yeoman, a Modified W-class destroyer cancelled in March 1919 prior to construction
- HMS Worcester (D96), a destroyer commissioned in 1922 and declared a constructive total loss in 1944, renamed HMS Yeoman when recommissioned as an accommodation ship in 1945, and sold for scrapping in 1946

The stone frigate HMS Yeoman was the ship name associated with the Flag Officer in Charge, London, during the Second World War.
