= HMS Wellesley =

Two ships of the Royal Navy and one shore establishment have been named HMS Wellesley after Arthur Wellesley, 1st Duke of Wellington.

== Ships ==
- HMS Wellesley was a Royal Navy school ship, formerly HMS Cornwall and renamed Wellesley in 1868.
- HMS Wellesley (1815), launched 1815, was a 72-gun third-rate ship of the line built at Bombay by the East India Company. Refitted as a training ship in 1868 and renamed HMS Cornwall. Sunk by enemy action, 1940.

== Shore establishments ==
- HMS Wellesley was a Royal Navy Nautical Training School at Blyth, Northumberland.
