= HMS Virulent (P95) =

Submarine of the Royal Navy

History

United Kingdom
- Name: HMS Virulent
- Ordered: 21 May 1942
- Builder: Vickers-Armstrongs, High Walker
- Laid down: 30 March 1943
- Launched: 23 May 1944
- Commissioned: 1 October 1944
- Identification: Pennant number P95
- Fate: Loaned to the Greek Navy, 29 May 1946

Greece
- Name: Argonaftis
- Acquired: 29 May 1946
- Out of service: 3 October 1958
- Identification: Y15
- Fate: Broke adrift on 15 December 1958 and stranded; Sold for scrapping in 1961

General characteristics
- Class & type: V-class submarine
- Displacement: 545 tons standard/658 tons full load surfaced; 740 tons submerged
- Length: 204 ft 6 in (62.33 m)
- Beam: 16 ft 1 in (4.90 m)
- Draught: 15 ft 3 in (4.65 m)
- Propulsion: 2 shaft diesel-electric, 2 Paxman diesel generators + electric motors, 615 hp (459 kW) / 825 hp (615 kW)
- Speed: 11.25 knots (21 km/h) surfaced; 10 knots (19 km/h) submerged
- Complement: 33 officers and men
- Armament: 4 × forward 21 inch (533 mm) torpedo tubes; 8 torpedoes; one 3 inch gun

HMS Virulent was a V-class submarine of the Royal Navy. She was built during the Second World War as part of the second batch (18 in number) of V-class submarines ordered on 21 May 1942.

Vickers-Armstrongs built her at High Walker, Newcastle upon Tyne. She was laid down on 30 March 1943, launched on 23 May 1944, and commissioned on 1 October 1944.

== Fate ==
Virulent was lent to the Hellenic Navy as Argonaftis (Y15) from 29 May 1946 until 3 October 1958. She was intended to be towed from Malta to the River Tyne. She broke adrift from the tow on 15 December 1958 and became stranded on the northern Spanish coast. She was then found and towed by two Spanish trawlers, the frigate Hernán Cortés and the patrol boat V-18 to Pasajes on 6 January 1959. Sold to a Spanish scrap company in spring 1961, she was eventually scrapped in April 1961 at Pasajes.
