= HMS Vindex =

HMS Vindex has been the name of more than one Royal Navy ship;

- HMS Vindex (1915), a mixed seaplane and landplane carrier acquired in 1915 and sold in 1920 (formerly SS Viking of the Isle of Man Steam Packet)
- HMS Vindex (D15), a Nairana-class escort carrier commissioned in 1943 and sold in 1947
