= HMS Wave (J385) =

Minesweeper of the Royal Navy

History

United Kingdom
- Name: Wave
- Builder: Lobnitz, Renfrew, Scotland
- Laid down: 17 March 1944
- Launched: 18 August 1944
- Commissioned: 14 November 1944
- Identification: Pennant number: J385
- Fate: Scrapped, 4 April 1962

General characteristics
- Class & type: Algerine-class minesweeper
- Displacement: 1,030 long tons (1,047 t) (standard); 1,325 long tons (1,346 t) (deep)
- Length: 225 ft (69 m) o/a
- Beam: 35 ft 6 in (10.82 m)
- Draught: 12.25 ft 6 in (3.89 m)
- Installed power: 2 × Admiralty 3-drum boilers; 2,400 ihp (1,800 kW)
- Propulsion: 2 shafts; 2 vertical triple-expansion steam engines
- Speed: 16.5 knots (30.6 km/h; 19.0 mph)
- Range: 5,000 nmi (9,300 km; 5,800 mi) at 10 knots (19 km/h; 12 mph)
- Complement: 85
- Armament: 1 × QF 4 in (102 mm) Mk V AA guns; 4 × twin Oerlikon 20 mm cannon

HMS Wave was a reciprocating engine-powered Algerine-class minesweeper built for the Royal Navy during the Second World War. She survived the war and was scrapped, in 1962.

== Design and description ==
The reciprocating group displaced 1,010–1,030 long tons (1,030–1,050 t) at standard load and 1,305–1,325 long tons (1,326–1,346 t) at deep load The ships measured 225 feet (68.6 m) long overall with a beam of 35 feet 6 inches (10.8 m). They had a draught of 12 feet 3 inches (3.7 m). The ships' complement consisted of 85 officers and ratings.

The reciprocating ships had two vertical triple-expansion steam engines, each driving one shaft, using steam provided by two Admiralty three-drum boilers. The engines produced a total of 2,400 indicated horsepower (1,800 kW) and gave a maximum speed of 16.5 knots (30.6 km/h; 19.0 mph). They carried a maximum of 660 long tons (671 t) of fuel oil that gave them a range of 5,000 nautical miles (9,300 km; 5,800 mi) at 10 knots (19 km/h; 12 mph).

The Algerine class was armed with a QF 4 in (102 mm) Mk V anti-aircraft gun and four twin-gun mounts for Oerlikon 20 mm cannon. The latter guns were in short supply when the first ships were being completed and they often got a proportion of single mounts. By 1944, single-barrel Bofors 40 mm mounts began replacing the twin 20 mm mounts on a one for one basis. All of the ships were fitted for four throwers and two rails for depth charges.

== Construction and career ==
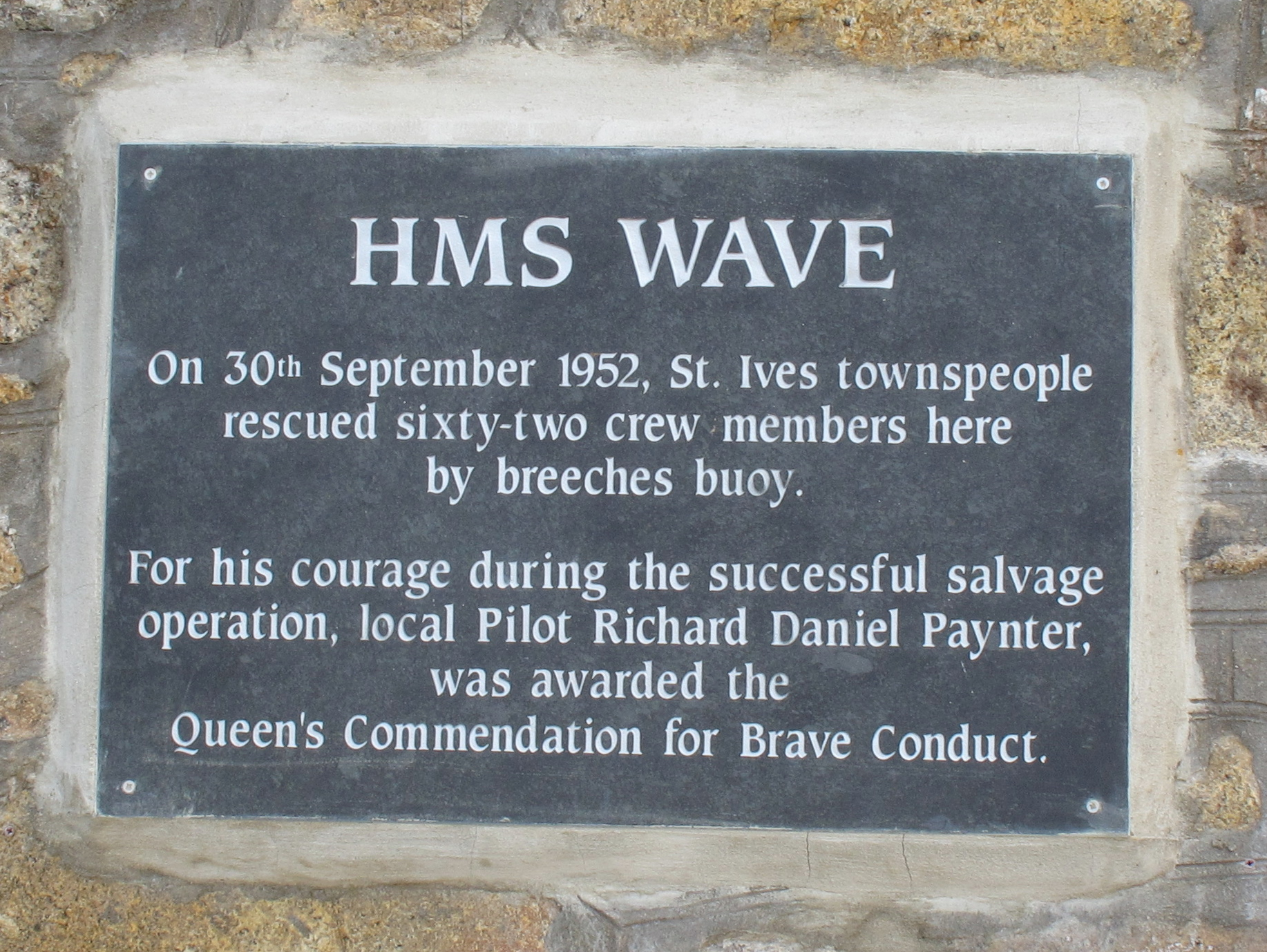
A plaque in St Ives, Cornwall commemorating the 1952 rescue

Wave was laid down by Lobnitz & Co. of Renfrew, Scotland, on 17 March 1944. She was launched on 18 August of that year and completed on 14 November, a build time of just 8 months and 28 days.

Wave joined the 10th Minesweeping Flotilla, and in January 1945 took part in operations off Norway. She was sent to the Far East in October 1945, returning to Britain in 1946, when she joined the Fishery Protection Squadron.

On 30 September 1952, Wave was sheltering in St Ives Bay during a storm when her anchor chain broke. She was driven ashore in the town of St Ives, Cornwall, with her hull being holed. Sixty-two of her crew were taken off by breeches buoy, while the remaining 32, including the ship's officers remaining onboard until she was salvaged by two Boom defence vessels and taken to Devonport dockyard for repair. From December 1956 to July 1958, Wave was the Senior Officer's Ship of the Fishery Protection Squadron.

Wave was scrapped by King at Gateshead from 4 April 1962.

== Bibliography ==
- Blackman, Raymond V. B., ed. (1953). Jane's Fighting Ships 1953–54. New York: McGraw-Hill Book Company Inc.
- Colledge, J. J.; Warlow, Ben (2006) [1969]. Ships of the Royal Navy: The Complete Record of All Fighting Ships of the Royal Navy from the 15th Century to the Present (3rd Rev ed.). London: Chatham Publishing. ISBN 978-1-86176-281-8. OCLC 67375475.
- Elliott, Peter (1977). Allied Escort Ships of World War II: A Complete Survey. London: MacDonald & Janes. ISBN 0-356-08401-9.
- Gardiner, Robert; Chesneau, Roger, eds. (1980). Conway's All the World's Fighting Ships 1922–1946. London: Conway Maritime Press. ISBN 0-85177-146-7.
- Lenton, H. (1998). British & Empire Warships of the Second World War. Annapolis, Maryland: Naval Institute Press. ISBN 1-55750-048-7.
- Worth, Jack (1984). British Warships Since 1945: Part 4: Minesweepers. Liskeard, UK: Maritime Books. ISBN 0-907771-12-2.
