= HMS Watchful =

Several ships of the Royal Navy have borne the name HMS Watchful:

- HMS Watchful (1804) was the mercantile brig Jane, which the Navy purchased in 1804 and renamed HMS Watchful. Jane had been launched in 1795 at Norfolk. In 1805, Watchful participated in several actions against French and Dutch vessels on their way to Boulogne. Watchful also participated in the siege of Cadiz in 1810–1811. Between 1811 and 1814 she served as a tender on the Thames. The Navy sold her in 1814.
- HMS Watchful (1856), a Clown-class wood steam gunboat built in 1856 by T & W Smith, North Shields. Sold at Hong Kong in 1871.
- HMS Watchful (1883), an Albacore-class 4-gun composite steam gunboat built by Laird in 1883. Tender to HMS Devastation from 1890. Became a boom defence vessel in 1903, then sold in 1907.
- HMS Watchful (1911), a coastguard vessel, built by Hall Russell for service in Newfoundland. Sold 1920 to the Newfoundland Government.
- HMS Watchful (1948), a fishery protection vessel, previously MFV 1080, renamed 1948.
- HMS Watchful (1956), a fishery protection vessel, previously Motor launch (naval) ML 2840.
- HMS Watchful (1959), a fishery protection vessel, previously Ley-class minehunter HMS Broomley. Renamed in 1959

In addition, the Royal Navy used the hired trawler Watchful as boom defence vessel BDV 7, 1915–1919.
