= HMS Wear =

Two ships of the Royal Navy have been named HMS Wear:

- HMS Wear (1905) was a River-class destroyer launched in 1905 and sold for scrap in 1919
- HMS Wear (K230) was a River-class frigate launched in 1942 and scrapped in 1957
