= HMS Verbena =

Two ships of the Royal Navy have been named HMS Verbena:

- HMS Verbena (1915) was an Arabis-class sloop launched in 1915 and sold for scrap in 1933
- HMS Verbena (K85) was a Flower-class corvette launched in 1940 and scrapped in 1951
