= HMS Zenobia =

A few ships of the British Royal Navy have borne the name HMS Zenobia, named after Zenobia, the Queen of the Palmyrene Empire who conquered Egypt.

- HMS Zenobia (1806) was a 10-gun schooner or cutter launched in 1806 that was wrecked in October twenty miles south of Cape Henry, Virginia.
- HMS Zenobia (1807) was an 18-gun Cruizer-class brig-sloop launched in 1807 and sold in 1835.
- HMIS Zenobia (1839) was built at Waterford as Kilkenny in 1839 and purchased on the stocks for the Indian Navy for use as a paddle sloop; she was hulked in 1850
- HMIS Zenobia (1851) was a steam frigate that the Bombay Dockyard built in 1851 for the Indian Navy
- HMS Zenobia (K211) was a Flower-class corvette launched in 1941 and renamed Snowflake. She shared in the sinking on 3 July 1943 by gunfire of U-125. Sold in 1947 as weather ship Weather Watcher. Scrapped in May 1962 at Dublin.

== See also ==
- Zenobia (ship)
