= HMS Variable =

Three ships of the Royal Navy have borne the name HMS Variable:

- HMS Variable was a 12-gun sloop/schooner, previously the mercantile ship Redbridge. She was purchased in 1808, and removed from the Navy List in 1814.
- HMS Variable (1814) was a 14-gun schooner, previously the mercantile ship Edward. She was purchased in 1814 and broken up in 1817.
- HMS Variable (1827) was a 10-gun Cherokee-class brig-sloop launched in 1827. She was renamed HMS Pigeon and converted to a 6-gun packet brig in 1829. She was ordered to be sold in 1847.
