= HMS Wolverine =

Six ships of the Royal Navy have been named HMS Wolverine, or the alternative spelling Wolverene, after the wolverine:

- HMS Wolverine (1798) was a 14-gun brig-sloop, previously the civilian collier Rattler. She was purchased and converted in 1798 and sunk in action in 1804.
- HMS Wolverine (1805) was an 18-gun Cruizer-class brig-sloop launched in 1805 and sold in 1816.
- HMS Wolverine (1836) was a 16-gun Racer-class brig-sloop launched in 1836 and wrecked in 1855.
- HMS Wolverine (1863) was a Jason-class wooden screw corvette launched in 1863. She was sent to Australia as a training ship in 1881, and then converted to a mercantile barque. She sailed to Australia in 1895 but defects were discovered and she was hulked there.
- HMS Wolverine (1910) was a Beagle-class destroyer. launched in 1910 and sunk in a collision in 1917.
- HMS Wolverine (D78) was a V and W-class destroyer launched in 1919 and sold for scrapping in 1946.
