= HMS Valentine =

HMS Valentine has been the name of more than one ship of the British Royal Navy, and may refer to:

- HMS Valentine (1418), a barge built in 1418 and sold in 1424
- HMS Valentine (1917), a destroyer leader launched in 1917 and sunk in 1940
- HMS Valentine (R03), renamed HMS Kempenfelt (R03), a destroyer launched in 1943 and transferred to Yugoslavia in 1956
- HMS Valentine (R17), originally named HMS Kempenfelt (R17), a destroyer launched in 1943 and transferred to Canada in 1944 for service as HMCS Algonquin (R17)
