= HMS Wolfe =

Three ships of the Royal Navy have borne the name HMS Wolfe, after General James Wolfe, victor of the Battle of the Plains of Abraham in 1759. A fourth was laid down but never launched:

- HMS Wolfe (1813) was a 20-gun sloop on the Great Lakes. She was launched in 1813, renamed HMS Montreal in 1814 and was sold in 1832.
- HMS Wolfe was to have been a 104-gun Wolfe-class first rate. She was laid down in 1814 but was cancelled in 1831, with the hull being destroyed on the stocks in a storm in 1832.
- HMS Wolfe was a Lord Clive-class monitor, built as Sir James Wolfe and Wolfe before being named HMS General Wolfe before her launch in 1915. She was sold in 1921.
- HMS Wolfe (F37) was an armed merchant cruiser requisioned in August 1939, formerly the passenger ship SS Montcalm. She was purchased and converted into a submarine depot ship in 1942 and was broken up in 1952.

== See also ==
- HMS Wolf
