= HMS Winchester =

Seven ships of the Royal Navy have borne the name HMS Winchester, after the English city of Winchester:

- HMS Winchester (1693) was a 60-gun fourth rate launched in 1693. She foundered in 1695.
- HMS Winchester (1698) was a 48-gun fourth rate launched in 1698. She was rebuilt in 1717, was hulked in 1774 and broken up by 1781.
- HMS Winchester (1744) was a 50-gun fourth rate launched in 1744 and sold in 1769.
- HMS Winchester (1763) was an 8-gun cutter launched in 1763. Her fate is unknown.
- HMS Winchester (1822) was a 52-gun fourth rate launched in 1822. She became a training ship in 1861 and was renamed HMS Conway. She was renamed HMS Mount Edgecumbe in 1876 and was sold in 1921.
- HMS Winchester (L55) was a W-class destroyer launched in 1918. She was converted into an escort in 1940 and was sold for breaking up in 1946.
