= HMS Zetland =

Two ships of the Royal Navy have borne the name HMS Zetland:

- HMS Zetland (1917) was a Hunt-class minesweeper launched in 1917 and sold in 1923.
- HMS Zetland (L59) was a Hunt-class destroyer launched in 1942, transferred to Norway in 1954 and renamed Tromso. She was sold in 1965 for breaking up.
