= HMS Waterloo =

Two ships of the Royal Navy have borne the name HMS Waterloo, after the Battle of Waterloo. A third ship was planned but never completed:

- HMS Waterloo (1818) was an 80-gun third rate, built as HMS Talavera but renamed in 1817 and launched in 1818. She was renamed HMS Bellerophon in 1824, reduced to harbour service in 1848 and sold in 1892.
- HMS Waterloo (1833) was a 120-gun first rate launched in 1833. She was fitted with screw propulsion in 1859 and was renamed HMS Conqueror in 1862. She was lent to the Marine Society as a training ship and renamed Warspite in 1876. She was accidentally burnt in 1918.
- HMS Waterloo was to have been a Battle-class destroyer. She was laid down in 1945 but cancelled later that year.
