= HMS Vehement =

HMS Vehement has been the name of more than one British Royal Navy ship:

- HMS Vehement (1917), a destroyer launched in 1917 which served in World War I and was sunk in 1918
- HMS Vehement (P25), a submarine cancelled in 1944 prior to construction
