= HMS Walrus =

Three ships of the Royal Navy have borne the name HMS Walrus after the marine mammal:

- HMS Walrus (D24) was a W-class destroyer launched in 1917. She ran aground in 1938, was refloated and then broken up.
- HMS Walrus (1945) was an aircraft transporter launched in 1945 and renamed HMS Skua in 1953. She was sold into mercantile service in 1962.
- HMS Walrus (S08) was a Porpoise-class submarine launched in 1959, sold in 1987 and scrapped in 1991.
