= HMS Wilton =

HMS Wilton has been the name of a number of Royal Navy vessels:

- HMS Wilton (L128), a Type II Hunt-class destroyer
- HMS Wilton (M1116), the first minesweeper of GRP construction
