= HMS Viper (1777) =

History

Massachusetts
- Name: Viper
- Owner: Walter Spooner & Stephen Bruce
- Commissioned: 9 September 1776
- Captured: 26 September 1776

Great Britain
- Name: HMS Viper
- Acquired: Capture:26 September 1776; Purchase: 17 July 1777
- Fate: Broken up October 1779

General characteristics
- Tons burthen: c.70 (bm)
- Propulsion: Sails
- Sail plan: Schooner
- Complement: Privateer:30-50; British service:50
- Armament: Privateer: 6 × 4-pounder guns + 8 × swivel guns; British service: 10 × 3-pounder guns

HMS Viper was the Massachusetts privateer schooner Viper that HMS Perseus captured on 26 September 1776. The Royal Navy purchased Viper in 1777. She was broken up in New York in 1779.

== Massachusetts service and capture ==
Viper was on her first cruise in 1776 under her captain, Commander Benjamin Wormell (or Wormwell), when the British captured her. The notice in the London Gazette, under the heading "By the Perseus", simply states: "Viper, B. Wornwell, Master, Martin and Co. Owners; from Boston, on a Cruize; fitted as a Privateer."

== British service ==
The Admiralty bought Viper for £349 1s 9d on 17 July 1777. However, she may already have been active in the Royal Navy's service for some time, in fact, from not long after her capture. The same issue of the London Gazette that reported her capture had a long list of vessels captured between 10 March and 31 December 1776. That list includes 10 small prizes, "By the Viper".

Four boats on a fishing voyage from Piscataqua, carrying fish:

- May Flower, S. Crossman, master and owner;
- Dover, A. Fuinald, master and owner;
- Endeavor, J. Bitlou, master, and J. Batson, owner;
- Two Brothers, J. Bowden, master and owner
- Two abandoned boats, one with firewood and one with empty casks.
- Pelly, on a fishing voyage, is carrying fish.

Three vessels carrying lumber and shingles from Macchias, two to Newberry:

- Louisa, J. Colston, master and St. New, owner;
- Unity, J. Lord, master, and Jones, owner;
- Nancy, R. Adams, master, but belonging to the Congress. Unfortunately, there was another HMS Viper in the theater at the same time, a 10-gun sloop. It is not clear which Viper affected these captures, or even whether some are due to one and others to the other.

In 1777, Viper, a schooner of 10 guns and 50 men, was under the command of Lieutenant Edward Packenham. On 29 December, she was damaged by river ice.

On 7 May 1778, Viper was part of a squadron that accompanied some gallies, barges, and troops up the Delaware River from Philadelphia to Trenton. Over a three-day period, they burned 44 American vessels and captured a battery of six guns, all without suffering a single casualty. Among the vessels they burned was what was left of the American frigates Washington and Effingham. Seven of the vessels were privateers, pierced for from 10 to 18 guns.

On 13 June, Hunter and Viper captured a schooner at Rustigouche. She was on a cruise from Salem, and they sent her to Halifax, together with her stores.

== Fate ==
In 1779, Lieutenant Monins Hollingbery (or Hollingberry) replaced Packenham, but then transferred to Royal George. Viper was broken up at New York in October 1779. This rendered moot the 19 February 1780 order from the Admiralty that she be sold.
