= HMS Vienna =

Two Royal Navy ships have been called HMS Vienna.

- The ferry SS Vienna (1894) was an armed boarding steamer from 1915 to 1919.
- The ferry SS Vienna (1929) was a motor torpedo boat depot ship from 1942 to 1944.
