= HMS Vampire (P72) =

Submarine of the Royal Navy

- HMS Vampire

History

United Kingdom
- Name: HMS Vampire
- Builder: Vickers Armstrong, Barrow-in-Furness
- Laid down: 9 November 1942
- Launched: 20 July 1943
- Commissioned: 13 November 1943
- Identification: Pennant number P72
- Motto: Invisa et Inopinata; Latin: "Unseen and Unexpected"
- Honours and awards: Aegean 1944
- Fate: Scrapped at Gateshead, March 1950

General characteristics
- Class & type: V-class submarine
- Displacement: 545 tons (standard - surfaced); 658 tons (full load - surfaced); 740 tons (submerged)
- Length: 204 ft 6 in (62.33 m)
- Beam: 16 ft 1 in (4.90 m)
- Draught: 15 ft 3 in (4.65 m)
- Propulsion: 2 shaft diesel-electric; 2 Paxman Ricardo diesel generators + electric motors; 615 hp (459 kW) / 825 hp (615 kW)
- Speed: 11.25 knots (20.84 km/h) surfaced; 10 knots (19 km/h) submerged
- Complement: 33
- Armament: 4 × bow internal 21 inch (533 mm) torpedo tubes; 8-10 torpedoes; 1 × 3-inch (76 mm) deck gun

HMS Vampire was a V-class submarine of the Royal Navy (RN).

The boat was laid down by Vickers-Armstrong at Barrow-in-Furness on 9 November 1942. She was launched on 20 July 1943, and commissioned into the RN on 13 November 1943.

The submarine operated during the late stages of World War II, and earned the battle honour "Aegean 1944". The submarine was decommissioned after the war in September 1945 and was broken up for scrap at Gateshead in March 1950
