= HMS Weazel =

Eleven ships of the Royal Navy have borne the name HMS Weazel or HMS Weazle, archaic spellings of weasel, while another was planned:

- HMS Weazel (1704) was a 10-gun sloop launched in 1704 and sold in 1712.
- HMS Weazel (1721) was an 8-gun sloop launched in 1721 and sold in 1732.
- HMS Weazel (1745) was a 16-gun sloop purchased on the stocks and launched in 1745. The French frigate Boudeuse captured her in 1779 in the West Indies. The French took her to the French Antilles where they removed her guns for Admiral d'Estaing's squadron. They then sold her at Guadeloupe in 1781.
- HMS Weazle (1783) was a 14-gun brig-sloop launched in 1783 and wrecked while attempting to leave Barnstaple Bay on 12 February 1799. She vainly fired signals of distress before she broke up; her purser was the only survivor of her crew of 106 men and boys.
- HMS Weazle (1799) was a 16-gun brig-sloop launched in 1799 and purchased that year. She was wrecked on 1 March 1804 off Cabritta Point near Gibraltar with the loss of one man of her crew of 70.
- HMS Weazel (1805) was an 18-gun Cruizer-class brig-sloop launched in 1805 and sold in 1815 for breaking up.
- HMS Weazel (1808) was a 10-gun schooner purchased in 1808 and on the navy lists until 1811.
- HMS Weazel (1822) was a 10-gun Cherokee-class brig-sloop launched in 1822 and sold in 1844.
- HMS Weazel (1855) was a Dapper-class wood screw gunboat launched in 1855 and sold in 1869.
- HMS Weazel (1873) was an Ant-class iron screw gunboat launched in 1873. She became an oil fuel lighter in 1904 and was renamed C 118.
- HMS Weazel (1906) was a tender, previously the War Department vessel Sir W. Green. She was transferred to the Royal Navy in 1906 and was renamed HMS Stoat in 1918. She was sold in 1923.
- HMS Weazel was to have been a W-class destroyer. The order was cancelled in 1918.
