= HMS Whiting =

Six ships of the Royal Navy have borne the name HMS Whiting, after the common name for Merlangius merlangus, a species of fish:

- HMS Whiting (1711) was a 6-gun vessel captured in 1711 and sold in 1712.
- HMS Whiting (1805) was a 4-gun Ballahoo-class schooner launched in 1805 that the French privateer Diligent captured in 1812.
- HMS Whiting (1812) was a 12-gun schooner, previously USS Arrow. She was captured in 1812 and wrecked in 1816.
- HMS Whiting (1856) was an Albacore-class wooden screw gunboat launched in 1856 and broken up in 1881.
- HMS Whiting (1889) was a Sharpshooter-class torpedo gunboat launched in 1889, renamed HMS Boomerang in 1890 and sold in 1905.
- HMS Whiting (1896) was a Star-class destroyer launched in 1896, reclassified as a C-class destroyer in 1913 and sold in 1919.
