= HMS Vega =

HMS Vega has been the name of more than one ship of the British Royal Navy, and may refer to:

- HMS Vega (1860), a brig used as a slave ship captured by the Royal Navy in 1860 and used as a coal hulk until sold in 1863
- HMS Vega (L41), a V and W-class destroyer launched in 1917 and sold in 1947 for scrapping
