= HMS Wild Boar =

Two naval vessels of Britain or the United Kingdom have borne the name Wild Boar or HMS Wild Boar, for the wild boar:

- Wild Boar was a flyboat of six guns and 172 tons (bm) that the British navy captured in 1665 and sold in 1667.
- HMS Wild Boar (1808) was a Cherokee-class brig-sloop launched at Finsbury in 1808 and lost in the Isles of Scilly in 1810.
