= HMS Ulleswater =

HMS Ulleswater may refer to the following Royal Navy ships that are named for Ullswater:

- HMS Ulleswater (1917), a Yarrow Later M-class destroyer.
- HMS Ullswater (FY252), a Lake-class whaler.
- HMS Ulleswater (1940), a British U-class submarine, renamed Uproar in April 1943.
