= HMS Vigo =

Four ships of the Royal Navy have been named HMS Vigo, after the Battle of Vigo Bay.

- HMS Vigo was a 48-gun fourth rate launched in 1693 as HMS Dartmouth (1693). She was captured by the French in 1695, retaken in 1702 and renamed HMS Vigo, and was wrecked in 1703.
- HMS Vigo (1810) was a 74-gun third-rate launched in 1810, used as a receiving ship from 1827, and broken up in 1865.
- HMS Vigo was a 74-gun third rate launched in 1817 as HMS Agincourt (1817). She was reduced to harbour service in 1848, renamed HMS Vigo in 1865 and was sold in 1884.
- HMS Vigo was to have been an Admiralty modified W-class destroyer. She was cancelled in December 1918.
- HMS Vigo (D31) was a Battle-class destroyer launched in 1945 and broken up 1964.
