= HMS Wivern =

Two ships of the British Royal Navy have been named HMS Wivern after the wivern of legend:

- HMS Wivern (1863), launched in 1863, was an early turret ship originally constructed for the Confederate States of America, taken into the Royal Navy after her launch. She served until 1898.
- HMS Wivern (1919), launched in 1919, was a W-class destroyer. She served as a convoy escort in World War II and was broken up in 1948.
