= HMS Vimiera =

Two ships of the Royal Navy have borne the name HMS Vimiera, an alternative spelling of Vimeiro in Portugal, site of the Battle of Vimeiro. A third ship was planned, but was later renamed:

- HMS Vimiera (1808) was a 16-gun brig-sloop, formerly the French Pylade, launched in 1805. She was captured in 1808 and sold in 1814.
- HMS Vimiera (1917) was an Admiralty V-class destroyer launched in 1917 and sunk by a mine in 1942.
- HMS Vimiera was to have been a Battle-class destroyer. She was renamed HMS Danae and reordered as a Daring-class destroyer in 1945; the order was cancelled in 1946.
