= HMS Zinnia =

HMS Zinnia may refer to the following ships of the Royal Navy:

- HMS Zinnia (1915), an Azalea-class sloop active during World War I; launched in August 1915; sold in 1920
- HMS Zinnia (K98), a Flower-class corvette active during World War II; launched in November 1940; sunk August 1941 by U-564
