= HMAS Doomba =

Australian naval warship

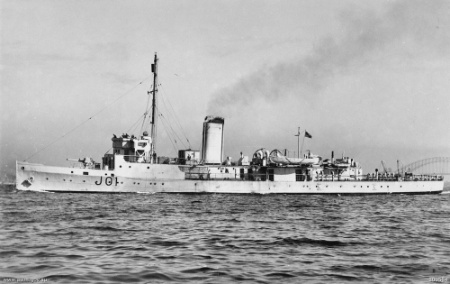
- HMAS Doomba in 1942

History

United Kingdom
- Name: Wexford
- Builder: William Simons & Co, Renfrew, Scotland
- Launched: 10 October 1919
- Commissioned: 1919
- Decommissioned: 1921
- Fate: Sold into mercantile service, later acquired by RAN

History

Australia
- Name: Doomba
- Acquired: 4 September 1939
- Commissioned: 25 September 1939
- Decommissioned: 13 March 1946
- Honours and awards: Battle honours: Pacific 1941–43
- Fate: Converted to an oil lighter in 1947 and scuttled in 1976

General characteristics (RAN service)
- Class & type: Hunt-class minesweeper
- Displacement: 750 tons
- Length: 231 ft (70 m)
- Beam: 28 ft 6 in (8.69 m)
- Draught: 16 ft 6 in (5.03 m)
- Speed: 17 knots (31 km/h; 20 mph)
- Armament: 1 × 4-inch (102 mm) gun, 1 × Bofors 40 mm, 1 × Oerlikon 20 mm, 2 × Lewis gun, 2 × Vickers MG, 51 depth charges
- Notes: Taken from:

HMAS Doomba was a Royal Australian Navy (RAN) warship of World War II. Built for the Royal Navy around the end of World War I as the Hunt-class minesweeper HMS Wexford, the ship only saw two years of service before she was decommissioned in 1921 and sold to the Doomba Shipping Company. The vessel was renamed SS Doomba, converted into a passenger ship, and operated in the waters around Brisbane until 1939, when she was requisitioned by the RAN for wartime service. Serving first as an auxiliary minehunter, then an auxiliary anti-submarine vessel, HMAS Doomba was purchased outright by the RAN in 1940, and served until early 1946, when she was sold and converted into a linseed oil lighter. Doomba was scuttled off Dee Why, New South Wales in 1976.

== Building ==
The ship was built for the RN as the Hunt-class minesweeper HMS Wexford. She was constructed by William Simons & Co at their shipyard in Renfrew, Scotland, launched in 1919, and commissioned later that year.

== Operational history ==
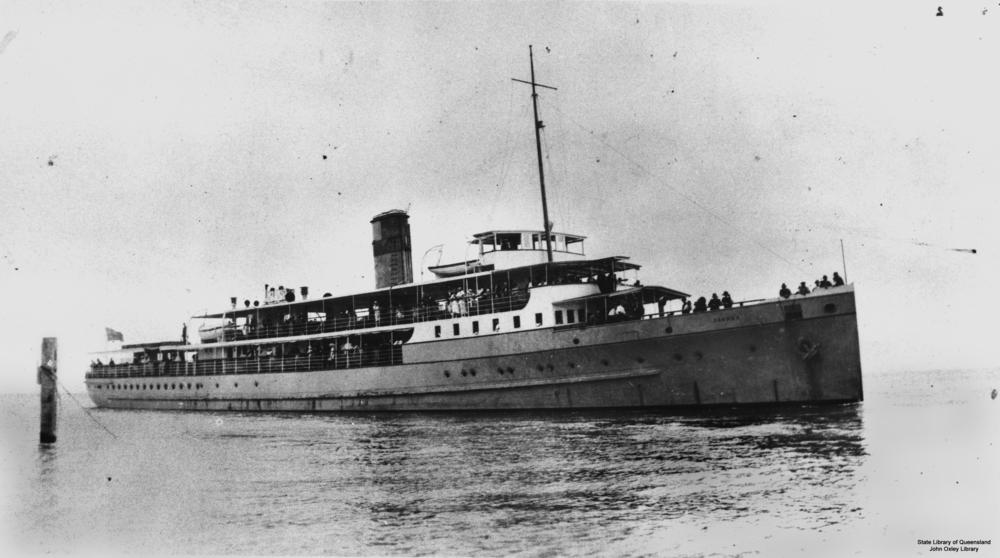
SS Doomba in civilian passenger service in 1923

The minehunter was decommissioned from the RN in 1921 and sold to the Doomba Shipping Company. After being converted to a passenger ship and renamed Doomba, she entered mercantile service in 1923, and was used to carry tourists between Brisbane and Bribie Island. In this role, she could carry 1,500 passengers, and was also used as a flagship for regattas.

The RAN requisitioned Doomba won 4 September 1939 and purchased in June 1940. In her service with the RAN, Doomba was first used as an auxiliary mine sweeper and later an auxiliary anti-submarine vessel. Her service during World War II earned the ship a battle honour: "Pacific 1941–43".

She was decommissioned from the RAN on 13 March 1946 and sold on 3 February 1947. She was converted to a linseed oil lighter in 1947 and renamed Meggol.

== Fate ==
On 9 December 1976, Meggol was scuttled off Dee Why, New South Wales. 33.716083°S 151.347217°E
