= HMS Windflower =

Two ships of the Royal Navy have been named HMS Windflower:

- HMS Windflower (1918) was an Anchusa-class sloop launched in 1918 and sold for scrap in 1927
- HMS Windflower (K155) was a Flower-class corvette launched in 1940 and loaned to Canada as HMCS Windflower in May 1941, she was sunk in December of the same year
