= HMS Veronica =

Two ships of the Royal Navy have been named Veronica:

- HMS Veronica (1915), an Acacia-class sloop
- HMS Veronica (K37), a Flower-class corvette
