= HMS Widgeon =

HMS Widgeon may refer to one of several Royal Navy ships named after the Widgeon:

- HMS Widgeon (1806), a schooner launched in 1806 and wrecked in 1808
- HMS Widgeon (1837), a packet boat in service until 1884
- HMS Widgeon (1889), a gunboat launched in 1889 and sold in 1906
- HMS Widgeon (1904), a gunboat launched in 1904 and sold in 1931
- HMS Widgeon (L62), a Kingfisher-class sloop launched in 1938 and scrapped in 1947
