= HMS Vanity =

HMS Vanity has been the name of more than one ship of the British Royal Navy, and may refer to:

- HMS Vanity (1650), a ship in service from 1650 to 1654
- HMS Vanity (D28), a V-class destroyer launched in 1918 and scrapped in 1947
