= HMS Vanessa =

HMS Vanessa has been the name of more than one ship of the British Royal Navy, and may refer to:

- HMS Vanessa (1914), an armed yacht in service from 1914 to 1919 which saw service in World War I
- HMS Vanessa (D29), a V and W-class destroyer in commission from 1918 to 1921 and from 1939 to 1945 which saw service in World War I and World War II
