= HMS Vestal =

Seven ships of the Royal Navy have borne the name HMS Vestal, a term pertaining to the goddess Vesta in Roman mythology:

- HMS Vestal (1757) was a 32-gun fifth rate launched in 1757 and broken up in 1775.
- HMS Vestal (1777) was a 20-gun sixth rate launched in 1777, but that foundered later that year.
- HMS Vestal (1779) was a 28-gun sixth rate launched in 1779. She became a troopship in 1800, was lent to Trinity House in 1803 and was sold in 1816.
- HMS Vestal (1809) – see HCS Vestal below
- HMS Vestal (1833) was a 26-gun sixth rate launched in 1833 and broken up by 1862.
- HMS Vestal (1865) was an Amazon-class wooden screw sloop launched in 1865 and sold in 1884.
- HMS Vestal (1900) was a Condor-class sloop launched in 1900 and sold in 1921.
- HMS Vestal (J215) was an Algerine-class minesweeper launched in 1943 and sunk by Japanese aircraft in 1945.

== See also ==
- HCS Vestal (1809) – a 14-gun brig of the British East India Company's naval arm, launched at Bombay Dockyard in 1809 and condemned in 1824 during the First Anglo-Burmese War
- HMS Vesta
