= HMS Wolf (1794) =

History

Great Britain
- Name: HMS Wolf
- Acquired: 1794
- Fate: Broken up 1803

General characteristics
- Type: Hoy
- Tons burthen: 57 bm
- Length: 64 ft 4 in (19.61 m) (overall); 53 ft 0 in (16.2 m) (keel)
- Beam: 15 ft 6 in (4.72 m)
- Depth of hold: 6 ft 2 1/2 in (1.892 m)
- Propulsion: Sails
- Complement: 30
- Armament: 1 × 24-pounder gun + 3 × 32-pounder carronades

HMS Wolf was a 4-gun gunvessel, originally a Dutch hoy that the British Admiralty purchased in 1794 for service with the Royal Navy. She was broken up in 1803.

Lieutenant Edward Bolling commissioned Wolf in March 1794, and paid her off in May 1795. Lieutenant John Whipple recommissioned her in June, for the Nore, and paid her off in February 1796. Lieutenant George Jardine commissioned her in October, Lieutenant William Robinson replaced Jardine in November. She was paid off in 1802 and broken up at Sheerness in August 1803.
