= HMY William & Mary =

Two ships of the Royal Navy have been named HMY William & Mary:

- HMY William & Mary (1694)
- HMY William & Mary (1807), a royal yacht of the United Kingdom
