= HMS Vidette =

Three vessels of the Royal Navy have borne the name HMS Vidette:

- HMS Barracouta (1782) was a 14-gun sloop, previously a cutter. She was purchased in 1782 and sold in 1792. She became the privateer cutter Thought, which the French captured in 1793. She became a French privateer and sailed under various names until captured as Vedette in 1800. The Royal Navy took her into service as HMS Vidette, but sold her in 1802, never having commissioned her.
- HMT Vidette (1917) was a Grimsby trawler of 240 GRT, named Ulverston, launched in 1905, and hired between 1916 and 1919. She was armed with one 12-pounder gun and served as a minesweeper. She was named Vidette II in February 1917. The Navy hired her again in February 1943 as a fuel carrier and renamed her Outpost in March. It returned her to her owners in 1945.
- HMS Vidette (D48) was an Admiralty V-class destroyer. Built at the end of the First World War, she served in the final months of that conflict, and saw extensive service in the inter war years and in World War II. She was an effective convoy escort and U-boat killer, being credited with the destruction of five U-boats during the Battle of the Atlantic.
