= HMS Welcome =

There have been five ships of the Royal Navy named HMS Welcome:

- HMS Welcome (1644), an 8-gun pink first listed in 1644 and captured by the French by 1647.
- HMS Welcome (1651), a 36-gun ship captured in 1652 and used as a fireship in 1673.
- HMS Welcome (1652), a 36-gun ship captured in 1652 and used as a blockship in obstruct the River Medway in 1667.
- HMS Welcome (1919), a Modified Admiralty W-class destroyer laid down in 1918 but cancelled before being launched.
- HMS Welcome (J386), a Algerine-class minesweeper launched in 1944 and sold in 1962 to be broken up.
