= HMS Unseen =

Two submarines of the Royal Navy have been named HMS Unseen

- HMS Unseen (P51) was a Second World War U-class submarine launched on 16 April 1942 and later served in the Mediterranean, being broken up in 1949.
- HMS Unseen (S41) is the old name of HMCS Victoria, a long-range hunter-killer (SSK) submarine of the Royal Canadian Navy, that was purchased from the Royal Navy in 1998.

== See also ==
- H.M.S. Unseen (novel), a novel by Patrick Robinson
