= HMS Vengeur =

Two ships of the British Royal Navy have been named HMS Vengeur.

- The first HMS Vengeur (1809) was acquired by capture from France in January 1809, and sold within the year.
- The second HMS Vengeur (1810) was a 74-gun third rate Vengeur-class ship of the line of the Royal Navy, launched on 19 June 1810 at Harwich. She was broken up in 1843.

== See also ==
- French ship Vengeur
