= HMS Whirlwind =

Two ships of the Royal Navy have borne the name HMS Whirlwind, after the whirlwind, an atmospheric phenomenon:

- HMS Whirlwind (D30) was a W-class destroyer launched in 1917 and sunk in 1940.
- HMS Whirlwind (R87) was a W-class destroyer launched in 1943, converted into a Type 15 anti-submarine frigate in 1953, and sunk as a target in 1974.
