= HMS Ulster =

Two ships of the Royal Navy have borne the name HMS Ulster, after Ulster, one of the four provinces of Ireland:

- HMS Ulster (1917) was a modified R-class destroyer launched in 1917 and sold in 1928.
- HMS Ulster (R83) was a U-class destroyer launched in 1942. She was converted into a Type 15 fast anti-submarine frigate between 1954 and 1956, and was sold in 1980.
