= HMS Umpire =

Three ships of the Royal Navy have borne the name HMS Umpire, probably after the official in the sport of cricket:

- HMS Umpire was a 100-gun first-rate ship of the line renamed HMS Royal George (1788) in 1782, before her launch, after the previous HMS Royal George (1756) foundered.
- HMS Umpire (1917) was a modified R-class destroyer launched on 9 June 1917 and sold for breaking up on 7 January 1930.
- HMS Umpire (N82) was a U-class submarine launched on 30 December 1940 and sunk in an accident nine days after commissioning.
