= HMY Victoria and Albert =

Three British Royal Yachts have been named HMY Victoria and Albert after the British Monarch and her husband:

- HMY Victoria and Albert (1843) was a twin paddle steamer launched 25 April 1843, later renamed Osborne
- HMY Victoria and Albert (1855), a 360-foot steamer launched 16 January 1855
- HMY Victoria and Albert (1899) completed in 1901
