= HMS Welfare =

Three ships of the Royal Navy have borne the name HMS Welfare. A fourth was planned but never completed:

- HMS Welfare (1350) was a King's ship mentioned in 1350.
- HMS Welfare (1689) was a captain's John Strong ship, commanding which he made a first landing on Falkland Islands in 1690.
- HMS Welfare was to have been an Admiralty modified W-class destroyer. She was laid down in 1918 but cancelled later that year.
- HMS Welfare (J356) was an Algerine-class minesweeper launched in 1943 and broken up in 1957.
