= HMS Upshot =

Submarine of the Royal Navy

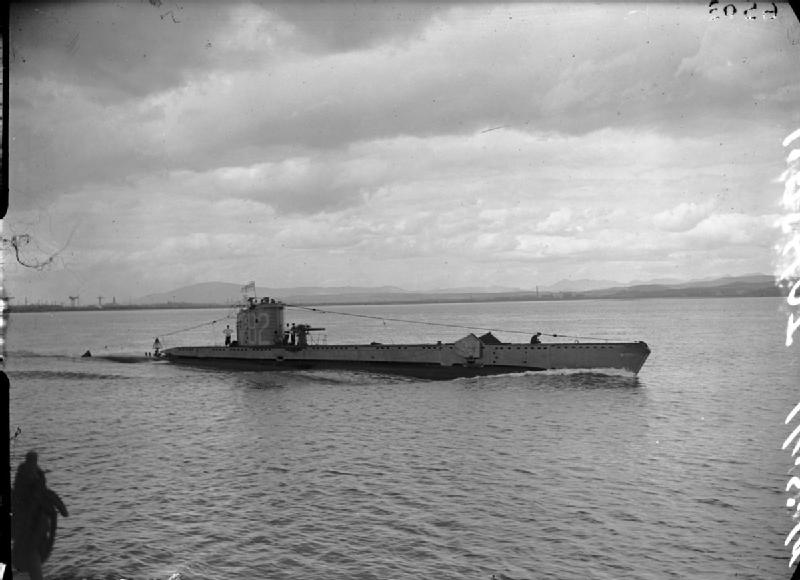

History

United Kingdom
- Name: HMS Upshot
- Ordered: 21 May 1942
- Builder: Vickers-Armstrongs, Barrow-in-Furness
- Laid down: 30 May 1943
- Launched: 24 March 1944
- Commissioned: 15 May 1944
- Decommissioned: 2 November 1949
- Identification: Pennant number P82
- Fate: Scrapped at Thos. W. Ward's shipbreakers, Preston
- Badge

General characteristics
- Class & type: V-class submarine
- Displacement: 545 tons standard/658 tons full load surfaced; 740 tons submerged
- Length: 204 ft 6 in (62.33 m)
- Beam: 16 ft 1 in (4.90 m)
- Draught: 15 ft 3 in (4.65 m)
- Propulsion: 2 shaft diesel-electric, 2 Paxman diesel generators + electric motors, 615 hp (459 kW) / 825 hp (615 kW)
- Speed: 11.25 knots (21 km/h) surfaced; 10 knots (19 km/h) submerged
- Complement: 33 officers and men
- Armament: 4 × forward 21 inch (533 mm) torpedo tubes; 8 torpedoes; 1 × QF 3 in (76 mm) gun

HMS Upshot was a V-class submarine of the Royal Navy. She was built during the Second World War as part of the second batch (18 in number) of V-class submarines ordered on 21 May 1942.

She was built by Vickers-Armstronsg (Barrow-in-Furness), being laid down on 3 May 1943, launched on 24 March 1944, and finally commissioned on 15 May 1944.

== Fate ==
The submarine was decommissioned on 2 November 1949 and broken up for scrap in Preston.
