= HMS Wren =

Two ships of the Royal Navy have been named HMS Wren after the bird.

- HMS Wren (D88), a V and W-class destroyer launched at Yarrow in 1919 and sunk by aircraft off Aldeburgh on 27 July 1940.
- HMS Wren (U28), a Modified Black Swan-class sloop launched on 11 August 1942 and, as part of Captain Frederic Walker's Second Escort Group, assisted in the sinking of several U-boats. Broken up in 1956.
