= HMS Upholder =

Two Royal Navy submarines have been named HMS Upholder.

- The first HMS Upholder (P37), launched in 1940, was a U-class submarine. She served in World War II. Her captain was Lieutenant Commander David Wanklyn, who received the Victoria Cross whilst in command of the vessel. HMS Upholder was the most decorated submarine in the British fleet. She was sunk off the coast of Sfax in North Africa by the Italian torpedo boat Pegaso in April 1942.
- The second HMS Upholder (S40), launched in 1986 and named after the first, was the lead ship of her class of submarines.
