= HMS Zenith (R95) =

Destroyer of the Royal Navy

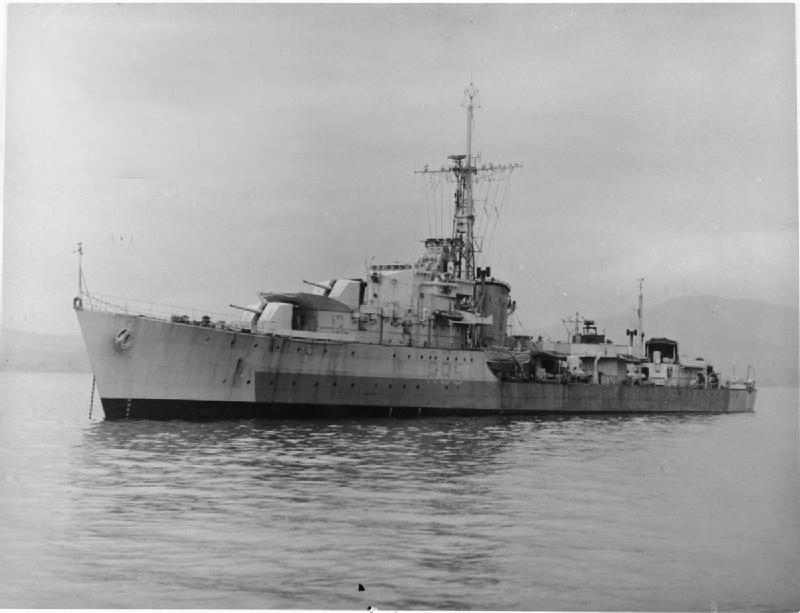
- HMS Zenith, 21 December 1944

History

United Kingdom
- Name: HMS Zenith
- Ordered: 12 February 1942
- Builder: William Denny and Brothers, Dunbarton
- Laid down: 19 May 1942
- Launched: 5 June 1944
- Completed: 22 December 1944
- Commissioned: 22 December 1944
- Out of service: Sold to Egypt, 1955
- Reclassified: D95, 1945
- Identification: Pennant number: R95
- Motto: 'This above all'
- Badge: A sun with rays

Egypt
- Name: El Fateh
- Acquired: 1955
- Commissioned: 28 August 1956
- Identification: Pennant number: 921
- Fate: Presumed scrapped, 2016

General characteristics
- Class & type: Z-class destroyer
- Displacement: 1,710 tons
- Length: 362.7 ft (110.6 m)
- Beam: 35.7 ft (10.9 m)
- Propulsion: Geared turbines; two shafts; 40,000 hp (30,000 kW)
- Speed: 37 knots (69 km/h; 43 mph)
- Complement: 186
- Armament: 4 х 4.5 in (114 mm) guns; 5 х 40 mm guns; 8 х torpedo tubes

HMS Zenith was a Z-class destroyer of the Royal Navy built as by William Denny and Brothers, Dunbarton. She was ordered as part of the 10th Emergency Flotilla, and was originally to have been named HMS Wessex. She spent her first ten years in Royal Navy service, before being sold to the Egyptian Navy, which operated her as El Fateh. She was a training ship until 2014, and her name was transferred to a new vessel in 2017, but she remains listed by the IISS.

== Second World War ==
On commissioning and work up Zenith joined the Home Fleet, however defects required repair and she was allocated for service in the Far East. She took passage to the Far East via the Mediterranean, but the war ended before she saw any operational service.

== Postwar Service ==
During 1946 Zenith was part of the 4th Destroyer Flotilla of the Home Fleet. In 1947 she was placed into reserve at Chatham, where she remained until 1950. On 17 October 1950 she was towed to Palmers on the River Tyne for refit. She was then part of the Harwich reserve between 1951 and 1954. Her proposed conversion to a Type 15 frigate was cancelled and in May 1955 she was transferred Egypt along with sister ship Myngs.

== Egyptian service ==
Zenith was sold to Egypt in 1955 and commissioned into the Egyptian Navy as El Fateh. She was refitted by John I. Thornycroft, Woolston and sailed for Egypt on 28 August 1956. She was modernized at White, Cowes between May 1963 and July 1964.

The ship was relegated to the role of a training vessel and remains extant today. Various attempts at preservation over the years have been made, but negotiations for the sale of the ship by the Egyptian Government have not been concluded as at 2014.

In September 2017, the name "El Fateh" appears to have been transferred to the first of Egypt's new Gowind-2500 corvettes. The ship's name "was transferred to the new corvette in order to commemorate the historic destroyer that played a great role during the 1973 October War.

The report did not indicate what if anything had been done to the Z-class destroyer El Fateh. Google images showed the possibility of the ship being scrapped in 2016.

== Publications ==
- Colledge, J. J.; Warlow, Ben (2006) [1969]. Ships of the Royal Navy: The Complete Record of All Fighting Ships of the Royal Navy from the 15th Century to the Present (3rd Rev ed.). London: Chatham Publishing. ISBN 978-1-86176-281-8. OCLC 67375475.
- Marriott, Leo (1989). Royal Navy Destroyers Since 1945. Ian Allan Ltd. ISBN 0-7110-1817-0.
- Raven, Alan; Roberts, John (1978). War Built Destroyers O to Z Classes. London: Bivouac Books. ISBN 0-85680-010-4.
- Whitley, M. J. (1988). Destroyers of World War 2. Annapolis, Maryland: Naval Institute Press. ISBN 0-87021-326-1.
