= HMS Whelp =

One ship of the Royal Navy has borne the name HMS Whelp, while another was planned. Another twelve have borne the name Lion's Whelp:

- HMS Whelp was to have been a modified W-class destroyer, ordered but cancelled in 1919.
- HMS Whelp (R37) was a W-class destroyer launched in 1943. She was sold to the South African Navy in 1953 and was renamed SAS Simon van der Stel. She underwent a limited conversion to a frigate in 1963, and was sold in 1976.

== Lion's Whelp ==
- HMS Lion's Whelp (1591) was a vessel of unknown type, lost at sea in 1591.
- HMS Lion's Whelp (1601) was an 11-gun ketch purchased in 1601 and given away in 1625.
- Ten 14-gun sloops were built for George Villiers, 1st Duke of Buckingham in 1627. They were all named Lion's Whelp, and numbered one to ten. They were acquired by the navy after the Duke's death:
  - Lion's Whelp I was sold in 1651.
  - Lion's Whelp II was sold in 1650.
  - Lion's Whelp III was lost in 1648.
  - Lion's Whelp IV was lost in 1636.
  - Lion's Whelp V was wrecked in 1637.
  - Lion's Whelp VI was wrecked in 1628.
  - Lion's Whelp VII was blown up in 1630.
  - Lion's Whelp VIII was hulked in 1645.
  - Lion's Whelp IX was wrecked in 1640.
  - Lion's Whelp X was sold in 1654.
