= HMCS Windflower =

Flower-class corvette

Coordinates: 46°19′N 49°30′W

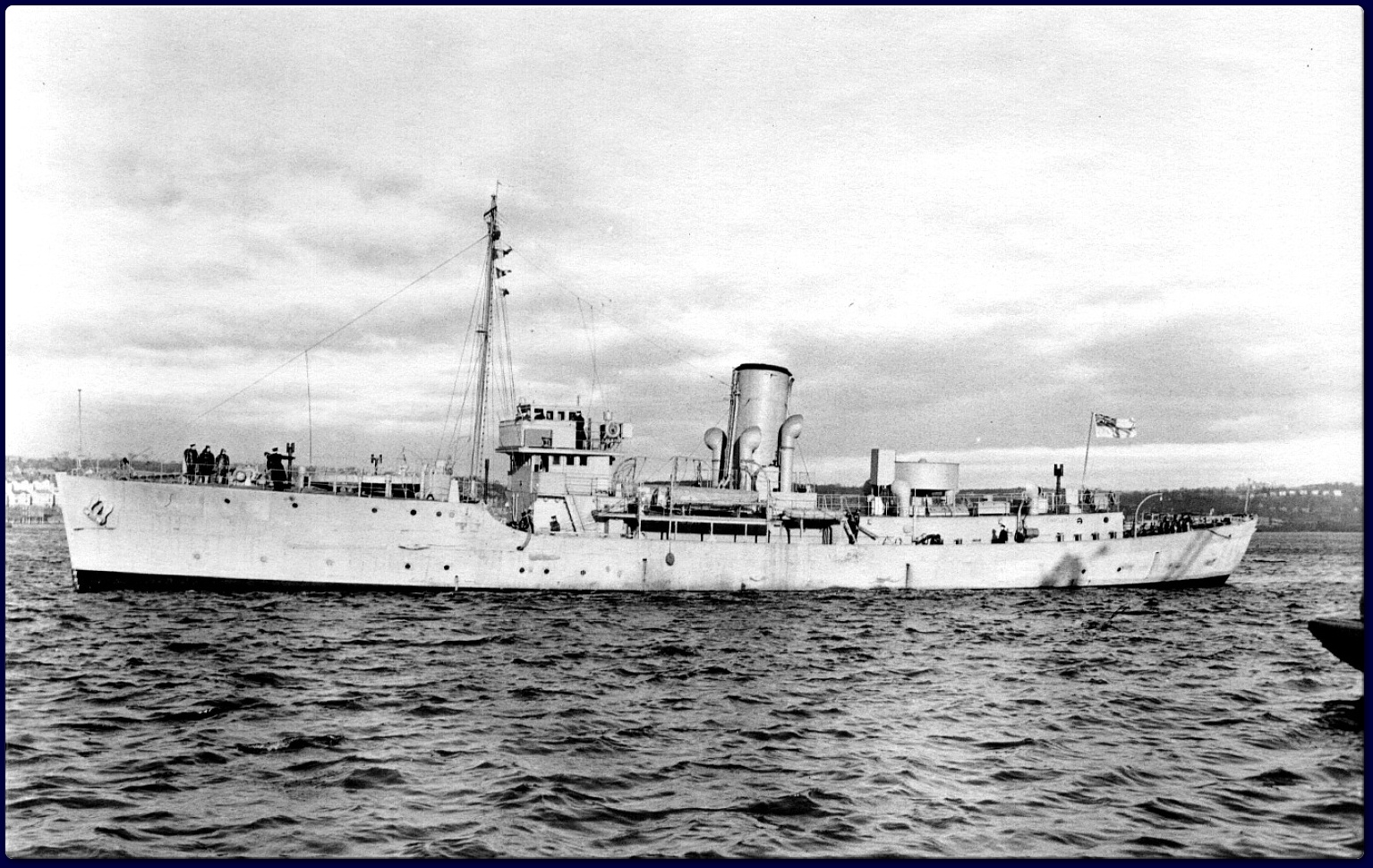
- HMCS Windflower during acceptance trials in 1940. Most of the ship's armament has not yet been fitted.

History

United Kingdom
- Name: Windflower
- Namesake: Windflower
- Ordered: 22 January 1940
- Builder: Davie Shipbuilding, Lauzon
- Laid down: 25 February 1940
- Launched: 4 July 1940
- Commissioned: 20 October 1940
- Out of service: 15 May 1941
- Identification: Pennant number: K155
- Fate: Loaned to Canada 1941; sunk 1941

Canada
- Name: Windflower
- Acquired: Loaned from United Kingdom
- Commissioned: 15 May 1941
- Out of service: 7 December 1941
- Identification: Pennant number: K155
- Honours and awards: Atlantic 1941
- Fate: Sunk on 7 December 1941

General characteristics
- Class & type: Flower-class corvette
- Displacement: 925 long tons (940 t)
- Length: 205 ft (62 m) o/a
- Beam: 33 ft (10 m)
- Draught: 11 ft 6 in (3.51 m)
- Installed power: 2,750 ihp (2,050 kW)
- Propulsion: 1 × 4-cycle triple-expansion reciprocating engine; 2 × Scotch fire-tube boilers; 1 × screw
- Speed: 16 kn (18 mph; 30 km/h)
- Range: 3,500 nmi (4,000 mi; 6,500 km) at 12 kn (14 mph; 22 km/h)
- Complement: 85
- Sensors & processing systems: 1 × SW1C or 2C radar; 1 × Type 123A or Type 127DV sonar
- Armament: 1 × BL 4 in (100 mm) Mk.IX gun; 4 × Vickers .50 cal machine guns (2×2); 4 × Lewis .303 cal machine guns (2×2); 2 × Mk.II depth charge throwers; 2 × Depth charge rails with 40 depth charges

HMCS Windflower was a Royal Canadian Navy Flower-class corvette which took part in convoy escort duties in the Battle of the Atlantic during the Second World War.

== Background ==
Flower-class corvettes like Windflower serving with the Royal Canadian Navy during the Second World War were different from earlier and more traditional sail-driven corvettes. The "corvette" designation was created by the French as a class of small warships; the Royal Navy borrowed the term for a period but discontinued its use in 1877. During the hurried preparations for war in the late 1930s, Winston Churchill reactivated the corvette class, needing a name for smaller ships used in an escort capacity, in this case based on a whaling ship design. The generic name "flower" was used to designate the class of these ships, which – in the Royal Navy – were named after flowering plants.

== Construction ==
Windflower was ordered on 22 January 1940 as part of the 1939-1940 Flower-class building program and laid down at George T. Davie & Sons Ltd., Lauzon on 24 February 1940. Launched on 8 August 1940 she was commissioned into the Royal Navy on 20 October. She was among the ten corvettes to be transferred to the RCN and commissioned on 15 May 1941. She could be told apart from other Canadian Flowers by her lack of minesweeping gear and the siting of the after gun tub amidships.

== Battle of the Atlantic ==
=== Service with Royal Navy ===
After working up at Tobermory Windflower was assigned to Escort Group 4 with the Royal Navy escorting convoys between the United Kingdom and Iceland.

=== Service with Royal Canadian Navy ===
After she was loaned to the Royal Canadian Navy Windflower transferred to Newfoundland Command after completing the voyage with OB 332. She made three round trips from St. John's to Iceland only interrupted by a short refit at Liverpool, Nova Scotia from August to mid-October.

=== Sinking ===
On 7 December 1941, Windflower was escorting Convoy SC.58 when she collided with Dutch merchant Zypenberg in dense fog on the Grand Banks at 46° 19N, 49° 30W. 23 crew were lost. At the time corvettes were not outfitted with radar.
