= HMS Utile =

Three vessels of the Royal Navy have borne the name HMS Utile. In addition, a fourth vessel was to have borne the name, but the name-change never occurred.

- HMS Utile was a gabarre of the French Royal Navy, launched in 1784. The British captured her in the Mediterranean in 1796 and she served briefly there before being laid up in 1797 and sold in 1798.
- HMS Utile (1799) was a French 16-gun privateer brig-sloop that the Royal Navy captured in 1799; she foundered in the Mediterranean in 1801.
- HMS Utile (1804) was the mercantile Volunteer, launched at Newcastle-on-Tyne in 1803, that the Admiralty. She had an undistinguished 10-year naval career before Admiralty sold her in 1814. She resumed the name Volunteer and after a voyage to Martinique she traded between London and Bordeaux. She was last listed in 1822.

Additionally:

- HMS Eyderen had been launched in 1802 as HDMS Eijderen. The Royal Navy captured her at Copenhagen in 1807. She was to have been renamed Utile, but the name-change never occurred.
