= HMS Wessex =

Four ships of the Royal Navy, and a division of the Royal Naval Reserve have borne the name HMS Wessex, after the historical Anglo-Saxon kingdom of Wessex:

- HMS Wessex (D43) was an Admiralty W-class destroyer launched in 1918 and sunk in 1940 in an air attack off Calais.
- HMS Wessex was to have been a Z-class destroyer, but was renamed HMS Zenith prior to launch.
- HMS Wessex (R78) was a W-class destroyer, previously named HMS Zenith, but renamed prior to launching in 1943. She was transferred to the South African Navy in 1950 and renamed SAS Jan van Riebeeck. She was decommissioned in 1975, and sunk as a target in 1980.
- HMS Wessex was the Southampton base of the Royal Naval Reserve, established after the Second World War and closed in 1994. In addition, two ships that served at different times as tenders to the base were also known as HMS Wessex:
  - HMS Derg, a River-class frigate, was HMS Wessex between 1951 and 1954.
  - HMS Erne, a Black Swan-class sloop was HMS Wessex between 1952 and 1965.
