= HMS Victorious =

Five ships of the Royal Navy have been named HMS Victorious.

- HMS Victorious (1785), launched at Blackwall Yard, London, was a 74-gun third-rate ship of the line
- HMS Victorious (1808), launched at Bucklers Hard, was a 74-gun third rate
- HMS Victorious (1895) was a Majestic-class battleship. She had a quiet career, spending World War I as a dockyard repair ship before being broken up in 1923.
- HMS Victorious (R38), an Illustrious-class aircraft carrier, launched in 1939. She saw much action in World War II. She was scrapped in 1969.
- HMS Victorious (S29), launched in 1993, is a Vanguard-class ballistic missile submarine

== Other ships ==
- The Royal Navy pre-dreadnought battleship HMS Prince George (1895) was briefly named HMS Victorious II in 1918–1919 before reverting to her original name.

== Battle honours ==
Ships named Victorious have earned the following battle honours:

- Rivoli, 1812
- Bismarck, 1941
- Arctic, 1941–42
- Norway, 1941–44
- Biscay, 1942
- Malta Convoys, 1942
- North Africa, 1942
- Sabang, 1944
- East Indies, 1944–45
- Palembang, 1945
- Okinawa, 1945
- Japan, 1945

== See also ==
- Victorious (disambiguation)
- HMS Victor
- HMS Victoria
- HMS Victory
