= HMS Vengeful =

Submarine of the Royal Navy

- HMS Vengeful (P86)

History

United Kingdom
- Name: HMS Vengeful
- Ordered: 21 May 1942
- Builder: Vickers Armstrong, Barrow-in-Furness
- Laid down: 30 July 1943
- Launched: 20 July 1944
- Commissioned: 16 October 1944
- Decommissioned: 1957
- Identification: Pennant number P86
- Fate: Scrapped at Gateshead on 22 March 1958.

General characteristics
- Class & type: V-class submarine
- Displacement: 545 tons surfaced; 740 tons submerged
- Length: 206 ft (63 m)
- Speed: 11.25 knots (20.84 km/h; 12.95 mph) surfaced; 10 knots (19 km/h; 12 mph) submerged
- Test depth: 300 ft (91 m)
- Complement: 37
- Armament: 4 × 21 inch (533 mm) bow torpedo tubes and 8 torpedoes; 1 × 3-inch (76 mm) deck gun; 3 × .303 calibre machine guns for anti-aircraft defence

HMS Vengeful was a Second World War British submarine of the V class.

== Construction ==
Vengeful was built at Vickers Armstrong, Barrow-in-Furness, U.K. between July 1943 and July 1944.

== Service history ==
Vengeful served in the Royal Navy from October 1944 to April 1945.

== Greek service ==
Vengeful was lent to the Greek Navy from April 1945 until 1957 where she served as Delfin (Y-9).
