= HMS Unique =

Three ships of the Royal Navy have borne the name HMS Unique:

- HMS Unique (1804) was the French 10-gun schooner Harmonie, captured from the French in 1804, and sunk while or after being recaptured by a French privateer in 1806.
- HMS Unique was HMS Netley, captured by the French in 1806, and used by them as the 21-gun privateer Duquesne. In 1807 HMS Blonde captured Duquesne, which the Royal Navy returned to service as the 12-gun HMS Unique. She was expended in an unsuccessful fireship attack in 1809.
- HMS Unique (N95) was a U-class submarine launched in 1940 and lost in 1942.
