= HMS Vectis =

HMS Vectis is a name that has been used more than once by the British Royal Navy, and may refer to:

- HMS Vectis (D51), a destroyer in commission from 1918 to 1936 that saw service in World War I and the British campaign in the Baltic in 1919
- HMS Vectis (shore establishment), a shore establishment at Cowes Castle, Isle of Wight, during World War II - see List of Royal Navy shore establishments
