= HMS Usk =

At least three ships of the Royal Navy have borne the name HMS Usk.

- HMS Usk (1903) was a River-class destroyer launched on 25 July 1903, sold for breaking up on 29 July 1920.
- HMS Usk (N65) was a group two U-class submarine. The submarine was commissioned on 11 October 1940 and reported overdue in the Mediterranean on 3 May 1941.
- HMS Usk (K295) was a River-class frigate which served in the Royal Navy from July 1943 until 1948 when it was transferred to the Egypt as Abikir.
