= British V-class submarine =

Submarine class

- V-class profile

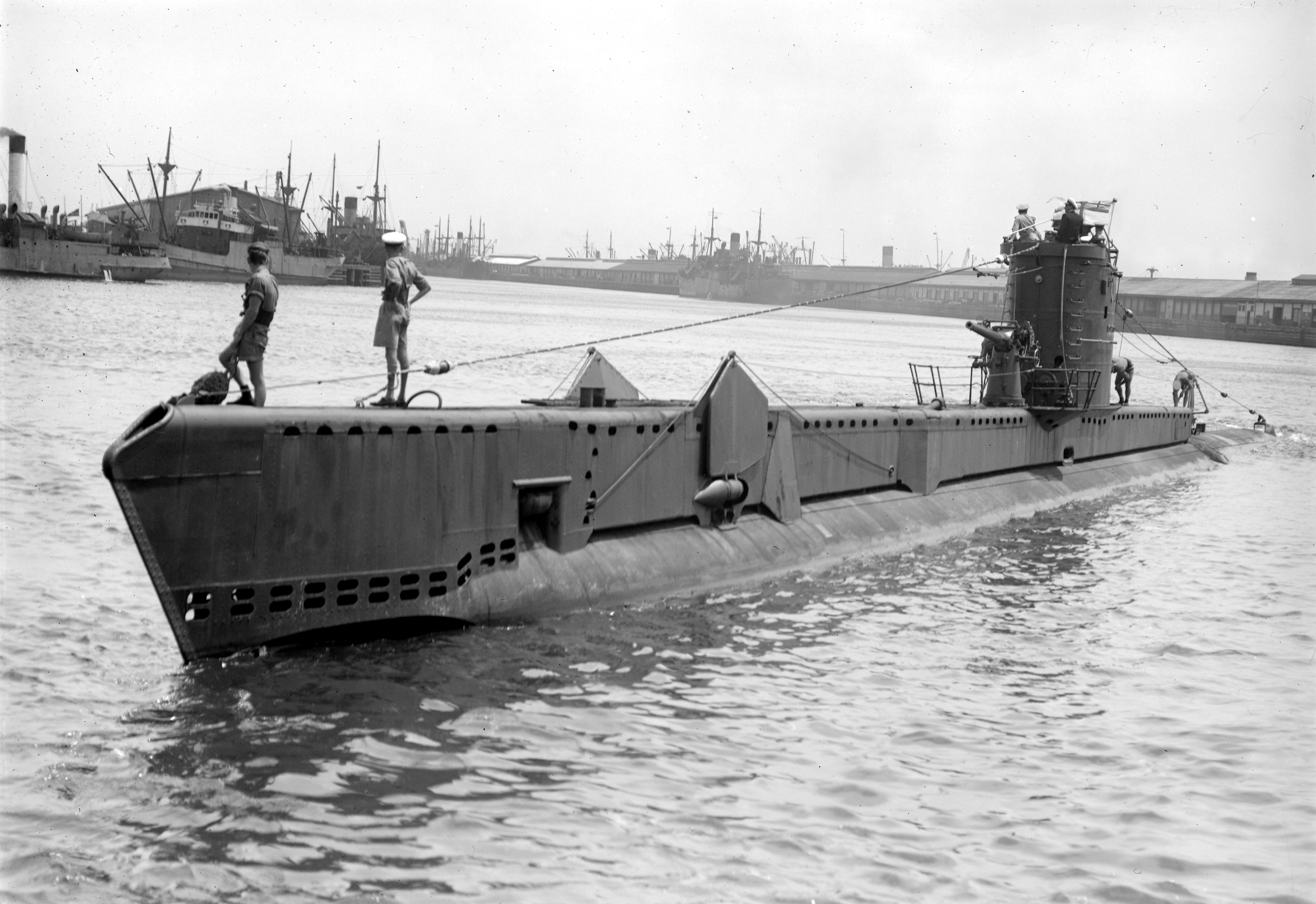
- HMS Voracious

Class overview
- Name: V class
- Builders: Vickers-Armstrongs
- Operators: Royal Navy; Free French Naval Forces; Royal Danish Navy; Royal Hellenic Navy; Royal Norwegian Navy
- Preceded by: U class
- Succeeded by: Amphion class
- Planned: 42
- Completed: 34 named (8 more never named) of which only 22 were completed.

General characteristics
- Type: Submarine
- Displacement: Surfaced – 545 tons standard, 658 tons full load; Submerged – 740 tons
- Length: 204 ft 6 in (62.33 m)
- Beam: 16 ft 1 in (4.90 m)
- Draught: 15 ft 3 in (4.65 m)
- Propulsion: 2 shaft diesel-electric, 2 Paxman diesel generators + electric motors, 615 hp (459 kW) / 825 hp (615 kW)
- Speed: 11.25 kn (20.84 km/h; 12.95 mph) surfaced; 10 knots (19 km/h; 12 mph) submerged
- Complement: 33
- Armament: 4 21 in (533 mm) torpedo tubes – (bow internal), 8 torpedoes; 1 × 3 in gun

The British V-class submarine (officially "U-Class Long hull 1941–42 programme") was a class of submarines built for the Royal Navy during the Second World War.

== History ==
Forty-two vessels were ordered to this design, all to be built by Vickers-Armstrongs at either Barrow-in-Furness or at Walker-on-Tyne, but only 22 were completed. Note that seven of these vessels received 'U' names (conversely, four of the U class had received names beginning with 'V').

The V-class submarines were very similar to the preceding U-class (short-hull) boats, of which they constituted a linear development, but had 3/4-inch (19 mm) pressure hull plating instead of 1/2-inch (13 mm) for deeper diving, also a lengthened stern and fining at the bow to reduce noise and improve underwater handling.

They were sometimes referred to as Vampire-class submarines after HMS Vampire.

It was one of this class, HMS Venturer, that is the only submarine to sink another submarine while submerged - that submarine was the German U-864.

== Ships ==
The vessels which were ordered are shown below in their programme order (not all completed construction):

The first eight vessels were ordered on 5 December 1941 under that year's programme.

- HMS Venturer (P68) - sold to Norway in 1946, renamed as Utstein
- HMS Viking (P69)
- HMS Veldt (P71), completed as Pipinos (Y8)
- HMS Vampire (P72)
- HMS Vox (P73)
- HMS Vigorous (P74)
- HMS Virtue (P75)
- HMS Visigoth (P76)

The next eighteen vessels were ordered on 21 May 1942 under that year's programme, but six of these were cancelled in early 1944.

- HMS Vivid (P77)
- HMS Voracious (P78)
- HMS Vulpine (P79) - Transferred to the Royal Danish Navy after the war as U2
- HMS Varne (P81)
- HMS Upshot (P82)
- HMS Urtica (P83)
- HMS Vineyard (P84), completed as French submarine Doris (P84)
- HMS Variance (P85), completed as HNoMS Utsira
- HMS Vengeful (P86), transferred to Greece in 1945 as Greek submarine Delfin (Y-9)
- HMS Vortex (P87), completed as French submarine Morse (P87)
- cancelled
- HMS Veto (P88), cancelled 23 January 1944 and scrapped on the slip
- HMS Virile (P89), cancelled 23 January 1944 and scrapped on the slip
- HMS Visitant (P91), cancelled 23 January 1944 (never laid down)
- HMS Upas (P92), cancelled February 1944 and scrapped on the slip
- HMS Ulex (P93), cancelled February 1944 (never laid down)
- HMS Utopia (P94), cancelled February 1944 (never laid down)
- HMS Virulent (P95)
- HMS Volatile (P96)

A further six vessels were ordered on 17 November 1942 under the same year's programme, but four of these were cancelled on 23 January 1944.

- HMS Votary (P29)
- HMS Vagabond (P18)
- cancelled
- HMS Vantage, cancelled 23 January 1944 (never laid down)
- HMS Vehement (P25), cancelled 23 January 1944 (never laid down)
- HMS Venom (P27), cancelled 23 January 1944 (never laid down)
- HMS Verve (P28), cancelled 23 January 1944 (never laid down)

Finally, a further ten vessels were ordered under the 1943 Programme, but all of these were cancelled on 20 November 1943; eight of these were never given names.

- cancelled
- HMS Unbridled (P11), cancelled 20 November 1943 (never laid down)
- HMS Upward (P16), cancelled 20 November 1943 (never laid down)
- Eight more unnamed boats
