= List of Royal Navy losses in World War II =

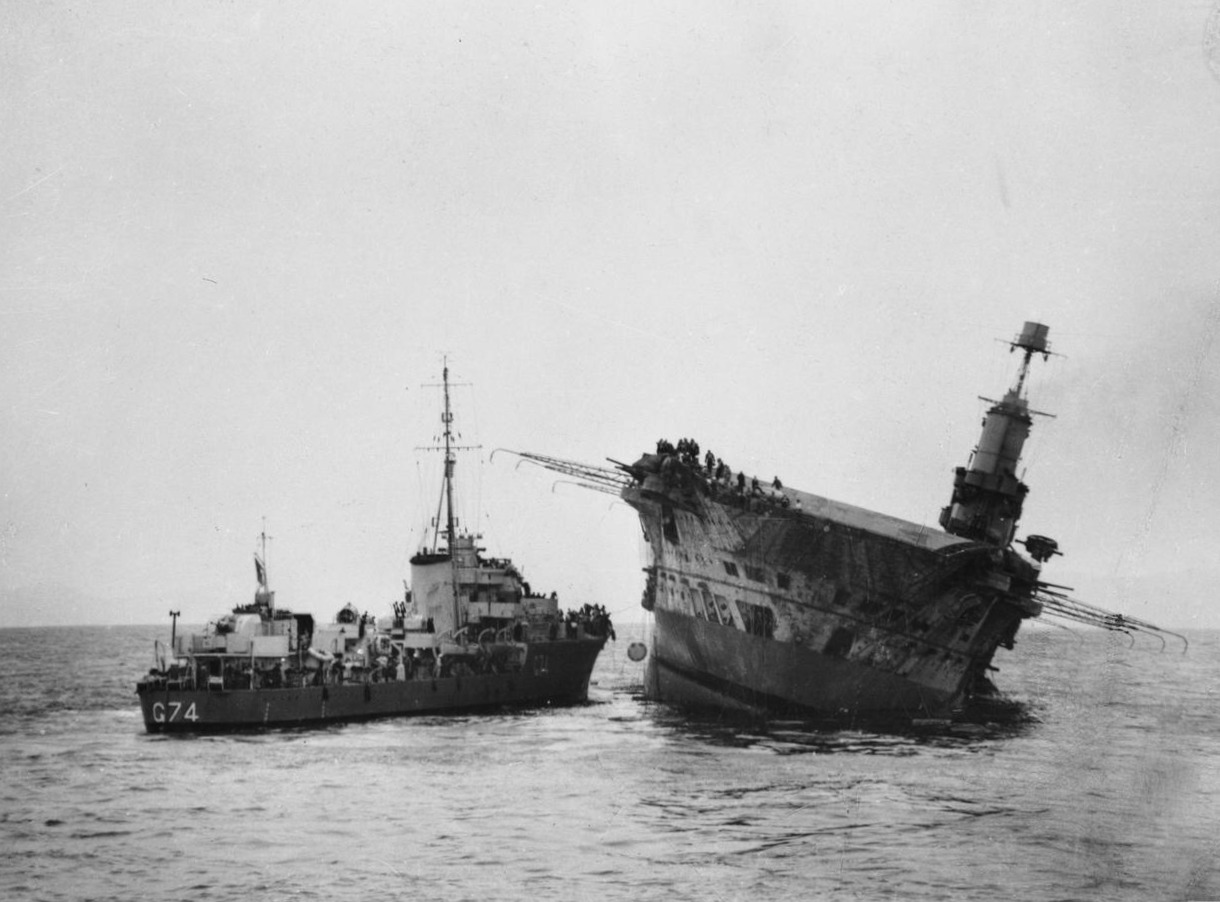
The aircraft carrier HMS Ark Royal sinking after being torpedoed by a German submarine in November 1941, the assisting destroyer HMS Legion was sunk in 1942.

This is a list of Royal Navy ships and personnel lost during World War II, from 3 September 1939 to 1 October 1945.

See also List of ships of the Royal Navy.

== Personnel losses ==
The Royal Navy lost 50,758 men killed in action, 820 missing in action and 14,663 wounded in action. The Women's Royal Naval Service lost 102 killed and 22 wounded.

== Combatants ==
=== Battleships ===
Name	Location	Date	Cause
HMS Royal Oak (08)	Scapa Flow	14 October 1939	Sunk by U-47
HMS Barham (04)	off the coast of Sidi Barrani, Egypt	25 November 1941	Sunk by U-331
HMS Prince of Wales (53)	South China Sea	10 December 1941	Sunk by Japanese aircraft

=== Battlecruisers ===
Name	Location	Date	Cause
HMS Hood (51)	Denmark Strait	24 May 1941	Sunk by gunfire from German battleship Bismarck
HMS Repulse (26)	South China Sea	10 December 1941	Sunk by Japanese aircraft

=== Aircraft carriers ===
Name	Location	Date	Cause
HMS Courageous (50)	off the coast of Ireland	17 September 1939	Sunk by U-29
HMS Glorious (77)	Norwegian Sea	8 June 1940	Sunk by gunfire from German battleships Scharnhorst and Gneisenau
HMS Ark Royal (91)	south east of Gibraltar	13 November 1941	Sunk by U-81
HMS Hermes (95)	Sri Lanka	9 April 1942	Sunk by Japanese aircraft
HMS Eagle (94)	south of Cape Salinas	11 August 1942	Sunk by U-73

=== Escort aircraft carriers ===
Name	Location	Date	Cause
HMS Audacity (D10)	Atlantic Ocean	21 December 1941	Sunk by U-751
HMS Avenger (D14)	off Gibraltar	15 November 1942	Sunk by U-155
HMS Dasher (D37)	Firth of Clyde	27 March 1943	Sunk by internal explosion

=== Cruisers ===
The Royal Navy lost 28 cruisers according to Stephen Roskill, and 34 including Commonwealth/Dominion ships, according to the Naval-History project.

Name	Location	Date	Cause
HMS Dunedin (96)	Atlantic Ocean	24 November 1941	Sunk by U-124
HMS Durban (D99)	off Normandy	9 June 1944	Deliberately scuttled as breakwater
HMS Neptune (20)	off Tripoli	19 December 1941	Sunk by Italian cruiser-laid mine
HMS Calypso (D61)	off Crete	12 June 1940	Sunk by Italian submarine Alpino Bagnolini
HMS Coventry (D43)	off Crete	14 September 1942	Scuttled following German air attack
HMS Curacoa (D41)	off Ireland	2 October 1942	Rammed in poor weather by RMS Queen Mary
HMS Curlew (D42)	off Narvik	26 May 1940	Sunk by German aircraft
HMS Cairo (D87)	off Bizerte	12 August 1942	Sunk by Italian submarine Axum
HMS Calcutta (D82)	off Alexandria	1 June 1941	Sunk by German aircraft
HMS Galatea (71)	off Alexandria	15 December 1941	Sunk by U-557
HMS Penelope (97)	off Naples	18 February 1944	Sunk by U-410
HMS Edinburgh (16)	Arctic Ocean	2 May 1942	Scuttled after torpedo damage by U-456 and then by German destroyers
HMS Southampton (83)	off Malta	11 January 1941	Scuttled following German air attack
HMS Manchester (15)	Cap Bon	13 August 1942	Scuttled following Italian motor torpedo boat attack
HMS Gloucester (62)	off Crete	22 May 1941	Sunk by German aircraft
HMS Charybdis (88)	Battle of Sept-Îles	23 October 1943	Sunk by German torpedo boat destroyers
HMS Hermione (74)	off Crete	16 June 1942	Sunk by U-205
HMS Bonaventure (31)	off Crete	31 March 1941	Sunk by Italian submarine Ambra
HMS Naiad (93)	off Crete	11 March 1942	Sunk by U-565
HMS Spartan (95)	off Anzio	29 January 1944	Sunk by German aircraft (glide bomb)
HMS Fiji (58)	off Crete	22 May 1941	Sunk by German aircraft
HMS Trinidad (46)	off North Cape	15 May 1942	Scuttled following German air attack
HMS Effingham (D98)	off Bodø	18 May 1940	Ran aground
HMS Cornwall (56)	off Ceylon	5 April 1942	Sunk by Japanese aircraft
HMS Dorsetshire (40)	off Ceylon	5 April 1942	Sunk by Japanese aircraft
HMS York (90)	Crete	26 March 1941	Scuttled following Italian explosive boat raid
HMS Exeter (68)	Battle of the Java Sea	1 March 1942	Sunk by Japanese heavy cruisers Haguro and Nachi

=== Destroyers ===
The Royal Navy lost 132 destroyers, according to Stephen Roskill and 153, including Commonwealth/Dominion ships, according to the Naval-History project.

Name	Location	Date	Cause
HMS Tenedos (H04)	Colombo Harbour	5 April 1942	Sunk by Japanese aircraft
HMS Porcupine (G93)	off Oran	9 December 1942	Torpedoed by U-602 (constructive total loss)
HMS Wensleydale (L86)	English Channel	21 November 1944	Damaged beyond repair after collision with a landing ship
HMS Blean (L47)	off Oran	11 December 1942	Torpedoed by U-443
HMS Ithuriel (H05)	off Bône	8 November 1942	Bombed by German aircraft (constructive total loss)
HMS Fury (H76)	off Normandy	21 June 1944	Beached after hitting a mine (constructive total loss)
HMS Foresight (H68)	off Bône	13 August 1942	Scuttled after being hit by Italian aircraft
HMS Firedrake (H79)	Atlantic Ocean	16 December 1942	Sunk by U-211
HMS Fearless (H67)	off Bône	23 July 1941	Scuttled after being hit by Italian aircraft
HMS Esk (H15)	off Texel	1 September 1940	Sunk by mine
HMS Escort (H66)	off Sardinia	11 July 1940	Sunk by Italian submarine Guglielmo Marconi
HMS Eclipse (H08)	Aegean Sea	24 October 1943	Sunk by mine
HMS Exmouth (H02)	Moray Firth	21 January 1940	Sunk by U-22
HMS Daring (H16)	off Norway	18 February 1940	Sunk by U-23
HMS Delight (H38)	English Channel	29 July 1940	Sunk by German aircraft
HMS Diamond (H22)	off Crete	27 April 1941	Sunk by German aircraft
HMS Duchess (H64)	off Mull of Kintyre	12 December 1939	Sunk in a collision with HMS Barham
HMS Defender (H07)	off Sidi Barrani	11 July 1941	Scuttled after being hit by German aircraft
HMS Dainty (H53)	off Tobruk	24 February 1941	Sunk by German aircraft
HMS Imogen (D44)	Pentland Firth	16 July 1940	Sunk in collision with HMS Glasgow (C21)
HMS Imperial (D09)	off Crete	29 May 1941	Scuttled after being hit by Italian bombers
HMS Inglefield (D02)	off Anzio	25 February 1944	Sunk by German aircraft
HMS Ivanhoe (D16)	off Texel	1 September 1940	Scuttled after hitting a mine
HMS Isis (D87)	off Normandy	20 July 1944	Sunk by mine
HMS Thanet (H29)	off Singapore	27 January 1942	Sunk by gunfire from Japanese light cruiser Sendai and destroyers Fubuki, Hatsuyuki, Amagiri, and Asagiri
HMS Thracian (D86)	Hong Kong	25 December 1941	Scuttled to avoid capture by Japanese forces
HMS Stronghold (H50)	off Sunda Strait	2 March 1942	Sunk by gunfire from Japanese heavy cruiser Maya and destroyers Nowaki and Arashi
HMS Sturdy (H28)	off Tiree	30 October 1940	Ran aground
HMS Keith (D06)	off Dunkirk	1 June 1940	Sunk by German aircraft
HMS Basilisk (H11)	off Dunkirk	1 June 1940	Sunk by German aircraft
HMS Blanche (H47)	Thames Estuary	13 November 1939	Sunk by mine
HMS Boadicea (H65)	Lyme Bay	13 June 1944	Sunk by German aircraft
HMS Brazen (H80)	English Channel	20 July 1940	Sunk by German aircraft
HMS Beverley (H64)	Atlantic Ocean	11 April 1943	Sunk by U-188
HMS Broadwater (H81)	Atlantic Ocean	18 October 1941	Sunk by U-101
HMS Belmont (H46)	Atlantic Ocean	31 January 1942	Sunk by U-82
HMS Broke (D83)	off Algiers	8 November 1942	Sunk by French shore batteries
HMS Cameron (I05)	Portsmouth	5 December 1940	Sunk by German aircraft
HMS Campbeltown (I42)	St Nazaire Raid	28 March 1942	Intentional explosion after ramming St Nazaire dry dock
HMS Gallant (H59)	Malta harbour	5 April 1942	Hit an Italian mine off Panteleria/bombed by German aircraft (constructive total loss)
HMS Rockingham (G58)	Atlantic Ocean	27 September 1944	Sunk by mine
HMS Stanley (I73)	Atlantic Ocean	19 December 1941	Sunk by U-574
HMS Valentine (L69)	off Terneuzen	15 May 1940	Beached after being damaged by German aircraft
HMS Venetia (D53)	Thames Estuary	19 October 1940	Sunk by mine
HMS Vimiera (L29)	Thames Estuary	9 January 1942	Sunk by mine
HMS Wakeful (H88)	Dunkirk evacuation	29 May 1940	Sunk by torpedo from an E-boat
HMS Warwick (D25)	Atlantic Ocean	20 February 1944	Sunk by U-413
HMS Wessex (D43)	off Calais	24 May 1940	Sunk by German aircraft
HMS Whirlwind (D30)	Atlantic Ocean	5 July 1940	Sunk by U-34
HMS Whitley (L23)	off Ostend	19 May 1940	Beached after being damaged by German aircraft
HMS Wryneck (D21)	off Crete	27 April 1941	Sunk by German aircraft
HMS Wren (D88)	off Aldeburgh	27 July 1940	Sunk by German aircraft
HMS Veteran (D72)	Atlantic Ocean	26 September 1942	Sunk by U-404
HMS Wild Swan (D62)	Atlantic Ocean	17 June 1942	Sunk by German aircraft
HMS Codrington (D65)	off Dover	27 July 1940	Sunk by German aircraft
HMS Acasta (H09)	off Narvik	8 June 1940	Sunk by naval gunfire from Scharnhorst and Gneisenau
HMS Achates (H12)	Barents Sea	31 December 1942	Sunk by naval gunfire from German heavy cruiser Admiral Hipper
HMS Ardent (H41)	off Narvik	8 June 1940	Sunk by naval gunfire from Scharnhorst and Gneisenau
HMS Acheron (H45)	off Isle of Wight	17 December 1940	Sunk by mine
HMS Jackal (F22)	off Crete	12 May 1942	Sunk by German aircraft
HMS Jaguar (F34)	off Sollum	26 March 1942	Sunk by U-652
HMS Juno (F46)	off Crete	21 May 1941	Sunk by Italian aircraft
HMS Janus (F53)	off Anzio	23 January 1944	Sunk by German aircraft
HMS Jersey (F72)	off Malta	2 May 1941	Sunk by mine (Italian)
HMS Jupiter (F85)	off Java	27 February 1942	Sunk by mine (Dutch)
HMS Kelly (F01)	off Crete	23 May 1941	Sunk by German aircraft
HMS Kandahar (F28)	Mediterranean Sea	19 December 1941	Sunk by Italian cruiser-laid mine
HMS Kashmir (F12)	off Crete	23 May 1941	Sunk by German aircraft
HMS Khartoum (F45)	Perim	23 June 1940	Sunk by internal explosion after surface engagement with Italian submarine Torricelli
HMS Kingston (F64)	Malta	11 April 1942	Sunk by German aircraft at dry dock after being damaged by Italian battleship Littorio
HMS Kipling (F91)	off Mersa Matruh	11 May 1942	Sunk by German aircraft
HMS Berkeley (L17)	off Dieppe	19 August 1942	Sunk by German aircraft
HMS Exmoor (L61)	off Lowestoft	25 February 1942	Sunk by mine or torpedo
HMS Quorn (L66)	off Normandy	3 August 1944	Sunk by "Linse" explosive-motorboat
HMS Tynedale (L96)	off Jijel	12 December 1943	Sunk by U-593
HMS Dulverton (L63)	off Kos	13 November 1943	Sunk by German aircraft
HMS Heythrop (L85)	off Bardia	20 March 1942	Sunk by U-652
HMS Eridge (L68)	off El Daba	29 August 1942	Torpedoed by Italian motor torpedo boat (constructive total loss)
HMS Puckeridge (L108)	off Gibraltar	6 September 1943	Sunk by U-617
HMS Grove (L77)	off Egypt	12 June 1942	Sunk by U-587
HMS Hurworth (L28)	off Turkey	22 October 1943	Sunk by mine
HMS Southwold (L10)	off Malta	24 March 1942	Sunk by mine
HMS Airedale (L07)	off Malta	15 June 1942	Sunk by German aircraft
HMS Aldenham (L22)	off Škrda	14 December 1944	Sunk by mine
HMS Holcombe (L56)	Mediterranean Sea	12 December 1943	Sunk by U-593
HMS Limbourne (L57)	off Guernsey	23 October 1943	Sunk by torpedo from T22
HMS Penylan (L89)	off English Channel	3 December 1942	Sunk by torpedo from an E-boat
HMS Laforey (G99)	off Palermo	30 March 1944	Sunk by U-223
HMS Lance (G87)	Malta	9 April 1942	Sunk by aircraft
HMS Gurkha (G63)	off Sidi Barrani	17 January 1942	Sunk by U-133
HMS Legion (G74)	Malta	26 March 1942	Sunk by aircraft
HMS Lightning (G55)	Bône	12 March 1943	Sunk by torpedo from German E-boat
HMS Lively (G40)	Mediterranean Sea	11 May 1942	Sunk by German aircraft
HMS Mahratta (G23)	Atlantic Ocean	25 February 1944	Sunk by U-990
HMS Martin (G44)	off Algiers	10 November 1942	Sunk by U-431
HMS Pakenham (G06)	off Sicily	16 April 1943	Scuttled after being disabled by naval gunfire from Italian torpedo boat Cassiopea
HMS Panther (G41)	Aegean Sea	9 October 1943	Sunk by German aircraft
HMS Partridge (G30)	off Oran	18 December 1942	Sunk by U-565
HMS Quail (G45)	Gulf of Taranto	18 May 1944	Sunk by mine
HMS Quentin (G78)	off North Africa	2 December 1942	Sunk by German aircraft
HMS Swift (G46)	off Normandy	24 June 1944	Sunk by mine
HMS Glowworm (H92)	off Norway	8 April 1940	Sunk from damage taken after ramming by German cruiser Admiral Hipper
HMS Gipsy (H63)	off Harwich	21 November 1939	Sunk by mine
HMS Grafton (H89)	off Nieuwpoort	29 May 1940	Scuttled after being torpedoed by U-62
HMS Grenade (H86)	off Dunkirk	29 May 1940	Sunk by German aircraft
HMS Grenville (H03)	off Kentish Knock	19 January 1940	Sunk by mine
HMS Greyhound (H05)	off Crete	22 May 1941	Sunk by German aircraft
HMS Hardy (R08)	North Atlantic Ocean	30 January 1944	Sunk by U-278
HMS Hardy (H87)	Narvik	10 April 1940	Beached after being disabled by naval gunfire from five German destroyers
HMS Hasty (H24)	Mediterranean Sea	15 June 1942	Sunk by torpedo from German E-boat
HMS Havock (H43)	Cap Bon	6 April 1942	Ran aground
HMS Hereward (H93)	off Crete	29 May 1941	Sunk by German aircraft
HMS Hostile (H55)	off Cap Bon	23 August 1940	Scuttled after hitting a mine (Italian)
HMS Hunter (H35)	Narvik	10 April 1940	Sunk by German destroyers
HMS Hyperion (H97)	off Pantelleria	22 December 1940	Sunk by mine (Italian)
HMS Harvester (H19)	Atlantic Ocean	11 March 1943	Sunk by U-432
HMS Havant (H32)	off Dunkirk	1 June 1940	Scuttled after being bombed by German aircraft
HMS Hurricane (H06)	Atlantic Ocean	25 December 1943	Scuttled after torpedoed by U-415
HMS Afridi (F07)	off Norway	3 May 1940	Sunk by German aircraft
HMS Bedouin (F67)	off Pantelleria	15 June 1942	Sunk by naval gunfire from Italian cruisers Montecuccoli, di Savoia and aerial torpedo
HMS Cossack (F03)	Atlantic Ocean	27 October 1941	Sunk by U-563
HMS Gurkha (F20)	off Norway	9 April 1940	Sunk by German aircraft
HMS Maori (F24)	Malta	12 February 1942	Sunk by German aircraft
HMS Mashona (F59)	Atlantic Ocean	28 May 1941	Sunk by German aircraft
HMS Matabele (F26)	North Atlantic Ocean	17 January 1942	Sunk by U-454
HMS Mohawk (F31)	off Kerkennah Islands	16 April 1941	Sunk by torpedo from Italian destroyer Luca Tarigo
HMS Punjabi (F21)	Atlantic Ocean	1 May 1942	Rammed by HMS King George V
HMS Sikh (F82)	off Tobruk	14 September 1942	Sunk by German and Italian shore batteries
HMS Somali (F33)	North Atlantic Ocean	25 September 1942	Sunk by U-703
HMS Zulu (F18)	off Tobruk	14 September 1942	Sunk by German aircraft
HMS Electra (H27)	First Battle of the Java Sea	27 February 1942	Sunk by gunfire from Japanese destroyers Asagumo and Minegumo
HMS Encounter (H10)	Second Battle of the Java Sea	1 March 1942	Sunk by gunfire from Japanese heavy cruisers Myōkō and Ashigara and destroyers Kawakaze and Yamakaze

=== Submarines ===
Name	Location	Date	Cause
HMS Oxley	58° 30'N, 5° 30'E, off Stavanger, Norway	10 September 1939	Sunk by friendly fire from British submarine HMS Triton
HMS Seahorse (98S)	54° 19'N, 7° 30'E, Heligoland Bight	7 January 1940	Most likely mined or sunk by German minesweeper M-5
HMS Undine (N48)	54° 08'N, 7° 33'E, Heligoland Bight	7 January 1940	Scuttled after being severely damaged by German minesweepers M-1201, M-1204 and M-1207
HMS Starfish (19S)	55° 00'N, 7° 10'E, Heligoland Bight	9 January 1940	Sunk by German minesweeper M-7
HMS Thistle (N24)	59° 03'N, 5° 11'E, off Skudenes	10 April 1940	Sunk by German U-boat U-4
HMS Tarpon (N17)	56° 43'N, 6° 33'E, North Sea	10 April 1940	Sunk by German Q-Ship Schiff 40/Schürbek
HMS Sterlet (2S)	58° 55'N, 10° 10'E, Skagrerrak	18 April 1940	Sunk by German anti-submarine trawlers UJ-125, UJ-126 and UJ-128
HMS Unity (N66)	55° 13'N, 1° 19'W, off Blyth, Northumberland	29 April 1940	Sunk by accidental ramming from Norwegian ship Atle Jarl
HMS Odin (N84)	39º 30'N, 17º 30'E, Gulf of Taranto	14 June 1940	Sunk by Italian destroyers Strale and Baleno
HMS Grampus (N56)	off Augusta, Sicily	16 June 1940	Sunk by Italian torpedo boats Circe, Clio, Calliope and Polluce
HMS Orpheus (N46)	off Benghazi, Libya	June 1940	Most likely sunk by naval mine
HMS Shark (54S)	58° 18'N, 5° 13'E, off Egersund, Norway	6 July 1940	Scuttled to prevent capture after being damaged by German aircraft
HMS Phoenix (N96)	37º 15'N, 15º 15'E, off Augusta, Sicily	16 July 1940	Sunk by Italian submarine chaser Albatros
HMS Salmon (N65)	off Skudesnes	16 July 1940	Most likely sunk by naval mine
HMS Narwhal (N45)	56º50'N, 01º40'E, off Aberdeen, Scotland	23 July 1940	Sunk by German aircraft
HMS Spearfish	58° 07'N, 1° 32'E, North Sea	1 August 1940	Sunk by German U-boat U-34
HMS Oswald (N58)	37° 46'N, 16° 16'E, off Cap Spartivento	1 August 1940	Sunk by Italian destroyer Ugolino Vivaldi
HMS Thames (N71)	North Sea	3 August 1940	Most likely sunk by naval mine
HMS Rainbow (N16)	41° 28'N, 18° 05'E, Adriatic Sea	4 October 1940	Sunk by collision with Italian merchantman Antonietta Costa
HMS Triad (N53)	38° 16'N, 17° 37'E, Ionian Sea	15 October 1940	Sunk by Italian submarine Enrico Toti
HMS H49	off Texel, Netherlands	18 October 1940	Sunk by German auxiliary submarine chasers UJ-111, UJ-116 and UJ-118
HMS Swordfish (61S)	50° 24'N, 1° 21'W, off Isle of Wight	7 November 1940	Most likely sunk by naval mine
HMS Regulus (N88)	between lower Adriatic Sea and Strait of Otranto	6 December 1940	Most likely sunk by naval mine
HMS Triton (N15)	between lower Adriatic Sea and Strait of Otranto	18 December 1940	Most likely sunk by naval mine
HMS Snapper (39S)	Bay of Biscay	February 1941	Sunk by naval mine or by the German minesweepers M-2, M-13 and M-25
HMS Usk (N65)	Cape Bon	3 May 1941	Most likely sunk by naval mine
HMS Undaunted (N55)	off Tripoli, Libya	11 May 1941	Most likely sunk by naval mine
HMS Umpire (N82)	53° 09'N, 1° 08'E, off Cromer, Norfolk	19 July 1941	Sunk in accidental collision with British armed trawler HMS Peter Hendriks
HMS Union (N56)	off Pantelleria	20 July 1941	Sunk by Italian torpedo boat Circe
HMS Cachalot (N83)	32° 49'N, 20° 11'E, off Benghazi, Libya	30 July 1941	Sunk by ramming from Italian destroyer Generale Achille Papa
HMS P33	off Tripoli, Libya	August 1941	Most likely sunk by naval mine
HMS P32	33° 02'N, 13° 10'E, off Tripoli, Libya	18 August 1941	Sunk by either a naval mine or internal explosion
HMS Tetrarch (N77)	off Cape Granditola, Sicily, Italy	2 November 1941	Most likely sunk by naval mine
HMS Perseus (N36)	37° 54'N, 20° 54'E, off Zakynthos	6 December 1941	Sunk by naval mine
HMS H31	Bay of Biscay	26 December 1941	Most likely sunk by naval mine
HMS Triumph (N18)	Aegean Sea	14 January 1942	Most likely sunk by naval mine
HMS Tempest (N86)	39° 15'N, 17° 45'E, Gulf of Taranto	13 February 1942	Sunk by Italian torpedo boat Circe
HMS P38	32° 48'N, 14° 58'E, off Cape Misurata	23 February 1942	Sunk by Italian torpedo boat Circe and destroyers Emanuele Pessagno and Antoniotto Usodimare
HMS P39	Kalkara, Malta	26 March 1942	Destroyed in an air raid
HMS P36	Sliema, Malta	1 April 1942	Sunk in an air raid
HMS Pandora (N42)	Valletta, Malta	1 April 1942	Sunk in an air raid
HMS Upholder (P37)	34°47′N 15°55′E, off Tripoli, Libya	14 April 1942	Sunk by either a naval mine or by Italian torpedo boat Pegaso
HMS Urge	off Grand Harbour, Malta	27 April 1942	Sunk by naval mine
HMS Olympus (N35)	35° 55'N, 14° 35'E, off Malta	8 May 1942	Sunk by naval mine
HMS P.514	46° 33'N, 53° 39'W, off Newfoundland	21 June 1942	Sunk in friendly fire ramming by Canadian minesweeper HMCS Georgian
HMS Thorn (N11)	34° 25'N, 22° 36'E, off Gavdos	6 August 1942	Sunk by Italian torpedo boat Pegaso
HMS Talisman (N78)	off Sicily, Italy	17 September 1942	Most likely sunk by naval mine
HMS Unique (N95)	Bay of Biscay	24 October 1942	Possibly sunk by a premature explosion of its own torpedo
HMS Unbeaten	46° 50'N, 6° 51'W, Bay of Biscay	11 November 1942	Sunk in friendly fire air attack by Royal Air Force
HMS Utmost	Mediterranean Sea	25 November 1942	sunk south west off Sicily by depth charges from the Italian torpedo boat Groppo
HMS P222	40º29'N, 14º20'E, off Capri	12 December 1942	Sunk by Italian torpedo boat Fortunale
HMS Traveller (N48)	Gulf of Taranto	12 December 1942	Most likely sunk by naval mine
HMS P48	37° 15'N, 10° 30'E, Gulf of Tunis	25 December 1942	Sunk by Italian torpedo boat Ardente
HMS P311	off Tavolara, Sardinia	8 January 1943	Sunk by naval mine
HMS Vandal	Kilbrannan Sound, Firth of Clyde	24 February 1943	Foundered while preparing to dive
HMS Tigris (N63)	off Capri, Italy	27 February 1943	Most likely sunk by German submarine chaser UJ 2210
HMS Turbulent (N98)	off La Maddalena, Sardinia	6 March 1943	Most likely sunk by Italian torpedo boat Ardito
HMS Thunderbolt (N25)	off Cape San Vito, Sicily	14 March 1943	Most likely sunk by Italian corvette Cicogna
HMS P615	6° 49'N, 13° 09'W, off Freetown	18 April 1943	Sunk by German U-boat U-123
HMS Regent (N41)	off Barletta, Italy	18 April 1943	Most likely sunk by naval mine
HMS Splendid (P228)	40° 30'N, 14° 15'E, off Capri, Italy	21 April 1943	Sunk by German destroyer ZG 3 Hermes
HMS Sahib	38° 20.5'N, 15° 11.9'E, off Capo di Milazzo, Sicily	24 April 1943	Sunk by Italian torpedo boat Climene and Italian corvettes Gabbiano and Euterpe
HMS Parthian (N75)	Mediterranean Sea	July/August 1943	Most likely sunk by naval mine
HMS Saracen (P247)	42° 45'N, 9° 30'E, off Bastia, Corsica	14 August 1943	Sunk by Italian corvettes Minerva and Euterpe
HMS Usurper (P56)	Gulf of Genoa	October 1943	Most likely sunk by either naval mine or by German auxiliary submarine chaser UJ-2208/Alfred
HMS Trooper (N91)	off Leros, Greece	17 October 1943	Most likely sunk by naval mine
HMS Simoom (P225)	off Tenedos, Turkey	November 1943	Sunk by naval mine
HMS Syrtis	off Bodø	March 1944	Most likely sunk by naval mine
HMS Stonehenge (P232)	between northern Sumatra and the Nicobar Islands	March 1944	Unknown
HMS Sickle	Kythira Strait, Greece	June 1944	Most likely sunk by naval mine
HMS Stratagem	Strait of Malacca	22 November 1944	Sunk by Japanese submarine chaser CH 35
HMS Porpoise (N14)	off Perak Island	11 January 1945	Most likely sunk by Japanese aircraft

== Mine warfare ships ==
=== Minelayers ===
Name	Location	Date	Cause
HMS Princess Victoria	Humber Estuary	19 May 1940	Sunk by naval mine
HMS Port Napier (M32)	Loch Alsh, Scotland	27 November 1940	Destroyed by explosion/engine room fire
HMS Latona (M76)	32° 15'N, 24° 14'E, off Bardia, Libya	25 October 1941	Scuttled after damaged by German aircraft
HMS Redstart (M62)	Hong Kong	19 December 1941	Scuttled to prevent capture by Japanese forces
HMS Kung Wo	off Pompong Island	14 February 1942	Sunk by Japanese aircraft
HMS Corncrake (M82)	North Atlantic	25 January 1943	Foundered in gale
HMS Welshman (M84)	32° 12'N, 24° 52'E, off Tobruk, Libya	1 February 1943	Sunk by German U-boat U-617
HMS Abdiel (M39)	Taranto, Italy	10 September 1943	Sunk by naval mine

=== Minesweepers ===
Name	Location	Date	Cause
HMS Sphinx (J69)	57° 57′N 02° 00′W, north of Kinnaird Head	3 February 1940	Sunk by German aircraft
HMS Dunoon (J52)	52° 45'N, 2° 23'E, off Great Yarmouth	30 April 1940	Sunk by naval mine
HMS Brighton Belle (NF-17)	off Gull Light Buoy (Near Goodwin Knoll)	28 May 1940	Sunk after striking a submerged wreck
HMS Gracie Fields	51° 20'N, 02° 05'E, North Sea	29 May 1940	Sunk by German aircraft
HMS Waverley	off Dunkirk	29 May 1940	Sunk by German aircraft
HMS Devonia	La Panne, Belgium	31 May 1940	Severely damaged by German aircraft and beached
HMS Brighton Queen	off Dunkirk	1 June 1940	Sunk by German aircraft
HMS Skipjack (J38)	51° 03'N, 2° 24'E, off Dunkirk	1 June 1940	Sunk by German aircraft
HMS Dundalk (J60)	52º 03'N, 01º 48'E, off Harwich	17 October 1940	Sunk by naval mine
HMS Mercury	Irish Sea	25 December 1940	Sunk by naval mine
HMS Huntley (J56)	31° 25'N, 26° 48'E, off Mersa Matruh	31 January 1941	Sunk by German aircraft
HMS Southsea	River Tyne	16 February 1941	Sunk by naval mine
HMS Fermoy (J40)	Valletta, Malta	4 May 1941	Damaged beyond repair by Italian aircraft
HMS Stoke (J33)	off Tobruk, Libya	7 May 1941	Sunk by German aircraft
HMS Widnes (J55)	Suda Bay	20 May 1941	Sunk by German aircraft. Raised, repaired and put in Kriegsmarine service as UJ-2109
HMS Snaefell	off Sunderland	5 July 1941	Sunk by German aircraft
HMS Banka	off Tioman Island	7 December 1941	Sunk by naval mine
HMS Changteh	off Lingga Islands	14 February 1942	Sunk by Japanese aircraft
HMS Scott Harley	off Cilacap	1 March 1942	Most likely sunk by Japanese destroyers Arashi and Nowaki
HMS Sin Aik Lee	off Tunda Island, Sunda Strait	1 March 1942	Sunk by Japanese destroyers Fubuki and Hatsuyuki
HMS Abingdon (J23)	off Bighi, Malta	5 April 1942	Damaged beyond repair by Italian aircraft; beached and abandoned
HMS Fitzroy (J03)	52° 39'N, 2° 46'E, off Great Yarmouth	27 May 1942	Sunk by naval mine
HMS Gossamer (J63)	off Kola Inlet, Russia	24 June 1942	Sunk by German aircraft
HMS Niger (J73)	66° 35'N, 23° 14'W, off Iceland	5 July 1942	Sunk by naval mine (British Northern Barrage minefield SN72)
HMS Leda (J93)	76º 31'N, 05º 32'E, off Spitzbergen	20 September 1942	Sunk by German U-boat U-435
HMS Cromer (J128)	31° 26′N 027° 16′E, off Mersa Matruh	9 November 1942	Sunk by naval mine
HMS Algerine (J213)	36º 45'N, 05º 11'E, off Bougie, Algeria	15 November 1942	Sunk by Italian submarine Ascianghi
HMS Bramble (J11)	73° 18′N 30° 06′E, Barents Sea	31 December 1942	Sunk by German destroyer Friedrich Eckoldt
HMS Alarm (J140)	off Bone, Algeria	2 January 1943	Damaged beyond repair by German aircraft
HMS Hythe (J194)	37° 04'N, 5° 00'E, off Bougie, Algeria	11 October 1943	Sunk by German submarine U-371
HMS Cromarty (J09)	Strait of Bonifacio	23 October 1943	Sunk by naval mine
HMS Hebe (J24)	41° 08'N, 16° 52'E, off Bari, Italy	22 November 1943	Sunk by naval mine
HMS Felixstowe (J126)	41° 10'N, 9° 40'E, off Capo Ferro, Sardinia	18 December 1943	Sunk by naval mine
HMS Clacton (J151)	off Corsica, France	31 December 1943	Sunk by naval mine
HMS Cato (J16)	49° 25'N, 0° 17'W, off Normandy, France	6 July 1944	Sunk by German Neger human torpedo
HMS Magic (J400)	49° 25'N, 0° 15'W, off Normandy, France	6 July 1944	Sunk by German Neger human torpedo
HMS Pylades (J401)	49° 26'N, 0° 15'W, off Normandy, France	8 July 1944	Sunk by German Biber midget submarine
HMS Loyalty (J217)	50° 13'N, 0° 44'W, English Channel	22 August 1944	Sunk by German U-boat U-480
HMS Britomart (J22)	49° 41'N, 0° 05'E, off Le Havre, France	27 August 1944	Sunk by friendly fire air attack
HMS Hussar (J82)	49° 41'N, 0° 06'W, off Le Havre, France	27 August 1944	Sunk by friendly fire air attack
HMS Rahman	off Tunda Island, Sunda Strait	1 March 1942	Sunk by Japanese destroyers Fubuki and Hatsuyuki
HMS Regulus (J327)	off Corfu, Greece	12 January 1945	Sunk by naval mine
HMS Squirrel (J301)	off Phuket, Thailand	24 July 1945	Damaged beyond repair by naval mine and scuttled
HMS Vestal (J215)	off Phuket, Thailand	24 July 1945	Damaged beyond repair by kamikaze attack and scuttled

=== Frigate ===
Name	Location	Date	Cause
HMS Itchen (K227)	53° 25'N, 39° 42'W, North Atlantic	23 September 1943	Sunk by German U-boat U-666
HMS Tweed (K250)	48° 18'N, 21° 19'W, Atlantic Ocean	7 January 1944	Sunk by German U-boat U-305
HMS Gould (K476)	45° 46'N, 23° 16'W, Atlantic Ocean	1 March 1944	Sunk by German U-boat U-358
HMS Lawford (K514)	49° 26'N, 0° 24'W, off Normandy, France	8 June 1944	Sunk by German aircraft
HMS Mourne (K261)	49° 35'N, 5° 30'W, English Channel	15 June 1944	sunk by German U-boat U-767
HMS Blackwood (K313)	50° 07'N, 2° 01'W, off Portland Bill	16 June 1944	Sunk by German U-boat U-764
HMS Bickerton (K466)	71° 42'N, 19° 11'E, North Cape	22 August 1944	Damaged by German U-boat U-354 and scuttled
HMS Bullen (K469)	58º 30'N, 05º 03'W, off Strathy Point, Scotland	6 December 1944	Sunk by German U-boat U-775
HMS Capel (K470)	49° 50'N, 1° 41'W, off Cherbourg	26 December 1944	Sunk by German U-boat U-486
HMS Goodall (K479)	69° 25'N, 33° 38'E, Barents Sea	29 April 1945	Sunk by German U-boat U-286

=== Corvette ===
Name	Location	Date	Cause
HMS Godetia (K72)	55° 18'N, 5° 57'W, off Altacarry Head	6 September 1940	Sunk in accidental collision with the merchant ship Marsa
HMS Picotee (K63)	62° 00'N, 16° 01'W, North Atlantic	12 August 1941	Sunk by German U-boat U-568
HMS Zinnia (K98)	40° 25'N, 10° 40'W, Atlantic Ocean	23 August 1941	Sunk by German U-boat U-564
HMS Fleur de Lys (K122)	36° 00'N, 6° 30'W, off Strait of Gibraltar	14 October 1941	Sunk by German U-boat U-206
HMS Gladiolus (K34)	57° 00'N, 25° 00'W, North Atlantic	17 October 1941	Most likely sunk by German U-boat U-553
HMS Salvia (K97)	31° 46'N, 28° 00'E, off Alexandria	24 December 1941	Sunk by German U-boat U-568
HMS Arbutus (K86)	55° 05'N, 19° 43'W, North Atlantic	5 February 1942	Sunk by German U-boat U-136
HMS Hollyhock (K64)	7° 21'N, 81° 57'E, off Ceylon (Sri Lanka)	9 April 1942	Sunk by Japanese aircraft
HMS Auricula (K12)	12° 12'S, 49° 19'E, Courrier Bay, Madagascar	6 May 1942	Sunk by naval mine
HMS Gardenia (K99)	35° 49'N, 1° 05'W, off Oran, Algeria	9 November 1942	Sunk in accidental collision with HMS Fluellen
HMS Marigold (K87)	36° 50'N, 3° 00'E, off Algiers, Algeria	9 December 1942	Sunk by Italian aircraft
HMS Snapdragon (K10)	32° 18'N, 19° 54'E, off Benghazi, Libya	19 December 1942	Sunk by German aircraft
HMS Samphire (K128)	36° 56'N, 5° 40'E, off Bougie, Algeria	30 January 1943	Sunk by Italian submarine Platino
HMS Erica (K50)	32° 48'N, 21° 10'E, off Derna, Libya	9 February 1943	Sunk by naval mine
HMS Polyanthus (K47)	57° 00'N, 31° 10'W, North Atlantic	21 September 1943	Sunk by German U-boat U-952
HMS Asphodel (K56)	45° 24'N, 18° 09'W, North Atlantic	10 March 1944	Sunk by German U-boat U-575
HMS Orchis (K76)	off Courseulles-sur-Mer, France	21 August 1944	Damaged beyond repair by naval mine and beached
HMS Hurst Castle (K416)	55° 27'N, 8° 12'W, North Atlantic	1 September 1944	Sunk by German U-boat U-482
HMS Denbigh Castle (K696)	12° 12'S, 49° 19'E, Courrier Bay, Madagascar	13 February 1945	Sunk by German U-boat U-992
HMS Bluebell (K80)	69° 36'N, 35° 29'E, off Kola Inlet	17 February 1945	Sunk by German U-boat U-711
HMS Vervain (K190)	51° 47'N, 7° 06'W, of Dungarvan, Ireland	20 February 1945	Sunk by German U-boat U-1276

== Auxiliaries ==
=== Sloop ===
Name	Location	Date	Cause
HMS Bittern (L07)	64° 28'N, 11° 30'E, off Namsos, Norway	30 April 1940	Sunk by German aircraft
HMS Penzance (L28)	56° 16'N, 27° 19'W, North Atlantic	24 August 1940	Sunk by German U-boat U-37
HMS Dundee (L84)	56° 45'N, 14° 14'W, North Atlantic	15 September 1940	Sunk by German U-boat U-48
HMS Grimsby (U16)	32° 30'N, 24° 40'E, off Tobruk, Libya	25 May 1941	Sunk by German aircraft
HMS Auckland (L61)	32° 15'N, 24° 30'E, off Tobruk, Libya	24 June 1941	Sunk by German aircraft
HMS Culver (Y87)	31° 46'N, 28° 00'E, North Atlantic	31 January 1942	Sunk by German U-boat U-105
HMS Hartland (Y00)	Oran Harbour, Algeria	8 November 1942	Sunk by French destroyer Typhon
HMS Walney (Y04)	Oran Harbour, Algeria	8 November 1942	Sunk by French shore batteries
HMS Ibis (U99)	37° 00'N, 3° 00'E, off Algiers, Algeria	10 November 1942	Sunk by Italian aircraft
HMS Egret (L75)	42° 10'N, 9° 22'W, off Vigo, Spain	27 August 1943	Sunk by German aircraft
HMS Woodpecker (U08)	48° 49'N, 22° 11'W, North Atlantic	27 February 1944	Sunk by German U-boat U-256
HMS Kite (U87)	73° 01'N, 3° 57'E, North Atlantic	21 August 1944	Sunk by German U-boat U-344
HMS Lark (U11)	69º 30'N, 34º 33'E, Barents Sea	17 February 1945	Damaged beyond repair by German U-boat U-968
HMS Lapwing (U62)	69° 26'N, 33° 44'E, Barents Sea	20 March 1945	Sunk by German U-boat U-968

== Damage caused ==
Surface ships caused the loss of 63 warships, comprising:

- 1 capital ship
- 1 aircraft carrier
- 8 cruisers
- 24 destroyers
- 29 submarines

Enemy submarines sank 54 warships, including:

- 2 capital ships
- 5 carriers
- 9 cruisers
- 33 destroyers
- 5 submarines

Enemy aircraft sank 77 warships, including:

- 2 capital ships
- 1 carrier
- 12 cruisers
- 55 destroyers
- 7 submarines

Mines caused the loss of 54 warships, including:

- 2 cruisers
- 26 destroyers
- 26 submarines

Shore defenses sank two destroyers, while one carrier, three cruisers, 15 destroyers and nine submarines were lost to accidents or unknown causes.

=== Damage inflicted by enemy ===
German forces sank 162 warships, including:

- 2 battleships
- 1 battlecruiser
- 6 carriers
- 15 cruisers
- 114 destroyers
- 24 submarines

Italian forces sank 58 warships, including:

- 6 cruisers
- 15 destroyers
- 37 submarines

Japanese forces sank 19 warships, including:

- 1 battleship
- 1 battlecruiser
- 1 carrier
- 3 cruisers
- 10 destroyers
- 4 submarines

A further destroyer and two sloops were lost to Vichy French shore batteries and warships.

== See also ==
- List of United States Navy losses in World War II

== Literature ==
- Stephen Roskill: "Royal Navy - Britische Seekriegsgeschichte 1939-1945", Gerhard Stalling Verlag, 1961
