= U23 =

U23 may refer to

== Naval vessels ==
- German submarine U-23, various vessels
- HMS Crane (U23), a sloop of the Royal Navy
- SM U-23 (Austria-Hungary), a submarine of the Austro-Hungarian Navy

== Other uses ==
- Citroën U23, a French truck
- Under-23 sport
  - Under-23 athletics
