= Operation Bowery =

Anglo-American naval operation of World War II

- Part of the Battle of the Mediterranean of the Second World War
- Relief map of the Mediterranean Sea
Date	3–9 May 1942
Location	Western Mediterranean 35°9′27.13″N 11°30′49.22″E
Result	Allied victory

Belligerents
United Kingdom; United States	Italy; Germany

Commanders and leaders
Force W: Charles Daniel; USS Wasp: John W. Reeves, Jr.	

Casualties and losses
1 pilot killed 1 pilot returned to Wasp; 1 pilot missing	None

Operation Bowery was an Anglo-American operation during the Second World War to deliver fighter aircraft to Malta, an operation known informally as a Club Run. Spitfires were needed to replace the remaining obsolete Hurricane fighters, to defend Malta from Axis air raids.

In the first half of 1942, the Luftwaffe and Regia Aeronautica had inflicted serious damage on airfields, docks and other infrastructure. The bombing had severely depleted the number of operational fighters and anti-aircraft guns and the RAF had to withdraw most of its bombers and reconnaissance aircraft. So many ships were sunk in harbour that the Navy withdrew most of its ships.

The Regia Marina (Italian Royal Navy) found it much easier to protect convoys to Libya and the vast majority of the supplies and personnel convoyed reached port in April and May, allowing the Axis forces there to prepare for Operation Venice (26 May – 21 June 1942) against the Eighth Army at Gazala.

The success of Operation Bowery regained British air superiority, creating the conditions for Operation Julius and Operation Pedestal, convoy operations which revictualled Malta, easing the siege and allowing offensive air and naval operations to be resumed.

== Background ==
=== Intelligence ===
==== Axis ====
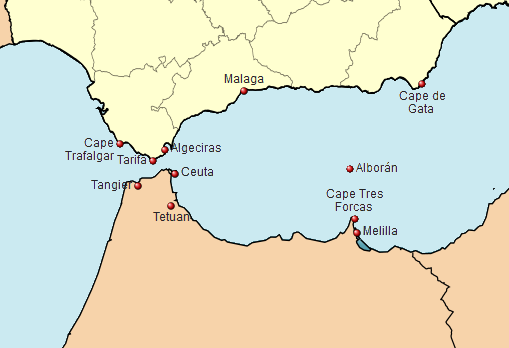
Axis ship-watching stations near the Strait of Gibraltar

In the autumn of 1941 Axis intelligence agencies had established eleven watch stations around Gibraltar, the main one being at Algeciras and others at Tarifa, Cape Trafalgar, Málaga, Cabo de Gata, Tangier, Ceuta, Tetuan, Cape Tres Forcas, Melilla and Alboran Island. Two of the stations had Spanish agents and others had German and Italians in Spanish uniform who, by early 1942, had gained a fair degree of efficiency. Messages usually reached Berlin within the hour and the British code-breakers at Bletchley Park could decrypt the signals so quickly that the Admiralty knew of a ship arrival at Gibraltar before the authorities there notified them.

Axis reports were usually accurate enough to name the big ships, except in poor visibility. The Germans began to install infra-red devices and night telescopes, to be more effective in poor weather and in the dark. In Unternehmen Bodden (Operation Bay) buildings were put up on either side of the Strait of Gibraltar for the new apparatuses and were operational by April 1942, the Admiralty having warned on 7 March that ships were likely to be detected at night.

==== British ====
The British on Malta obtained tactical intelligence from the local Royal Air Force (RAF) Y service unit. The Government Code and Cypher School (GC & CS) at Bletchley Park in England was able to decrypt some Luftwaffe operation orders, which showed that the main effort was to be against British airfields on Malta. The decrypts were not frequent enough because much of the Axis signals traffic was sent by land line and the time needed to decrypt wireless signals precluded their use for early-warning. The exploitation of radio and wireless transmissions by the Y unit was useful but neither it nor the radar on the island could give sufficient warning of air raids. The air superiority enjoyed by the Axis air forces meant that such warning of raids that was possible was of little tactical value. As soon as a supply convoy left Gibraltar or Alexandria, Axis agents reported it, GC & CS gaining a plethora of decrypts from them which the Admiralty could pass on to the local naval commanders on Axis positions, strengths, reconnaissance practices and the equipment and methods of their bombers and torpedo-bombers. Before a Malta convoy, the RAF conducted many photographic sorties, revealing more about Axis air force locations and strengths but this reached only as far as Naples. The authorities in London had a grandstand view but for early warning of attacks, until May 1942, convoys were reliant on aerial patrolling, radar and lookouts.

=== Malta ===
General map of Malta

As Malta began to run short of supplies, Operation MG 1 was mounted to escort Convoy MW 10 from Alexandria on 21 March. The convoy was the subject of a tentative attack by an Italian fleet; the Italians inflicted severe damage on several escorts in the Second Battle of Sirte but the weaker British force fended off the Italian fleet. The attack on the convoy led to its dispersal which caused a delay and it reached Malta in the morning and not at night as planned, leaving the merchant ships exposed to Axis air attack. In the next 48 hours, all the merchant ships were sunk off Malta or at their moorings; barely 5,000 long tons (5,100 t) of supplies were unloaded.

By the end of April 1942, Axis bombing had smashed the docks, ships, aircraft and airfields and the bombers began attacks on army camps, barracks, warehouses and road junctions, the preliminaries of invasion. After 18 April, German bombing suddenly stopped and Italian bombers took over, regularly bombing with small formations of aircraft. During the month, Axis aircraft flew more than 9,500 sorties against 388 by the RAF all but 30 of which were fighter sorties. The British lost 50 aircraft, 20 shot down in combat against 37 Axis losses, during the dropping of 6,700 long tons (6,800 t) of bombs, three times the March figure, 3,000 long tons (3,000 t) falling on the docks, 2,600 long tons (2,600 t) on airfields.

The bombing killed 300 civilians, left 350 people seriously wounded and demolished or damaged 11,450 buildings. Good shelters existed but some of the casualties were caused by delayed-action bombs. Three destroyers, three submarines, three minesweepers, five tugs, a water carrier and a floating crane were sunk in port and more ships damaged. The island continued to function as a staging post but the Axis bombing neutralised Malta as an offensive base. Two boats of the 10th Submarine Flotilla had been sunk, two were damaged in harbour and on 26 April the flotilla was ordered out because of mining by small fast craft, which were undetectable by radar and inaudible during the bombing; the surviving minesweepers were too reduced in numbers to clear the approaches. By May 1942, the civilian ration was only 1,200–1,500 Cal (5,000–6,300 kJ) and the bread ration was cut to 10.5 oz (300 g) on 5 May. The governor, Sir William Dobbie had given a deadline of mid-June for the exhaustion of the food on the island and could only be met by the delivery of substantial supplies of food, fuel, ammunition and equipment brought by sea. Lord Gort, who had taken over from Dobbie in May 1942, reported that starvation would force him to surrender within two months.

=== Malta convoys ===
Operation MF3, a supply convoy to Malta in January 1942 lost one of four ships and an escort was sunk by a U-boat; the February convoy suffered the loss of its three merchant ships to aircraft attack. During the March convoy, the escorts were forewarned by a submarine sighting and decrypts from the Italian C 38m coding machine, that an Italian fleet had sailed from Taranto, leading to the Second Battle of Sirte on 22 March 1942, the defence of the convoy by the 15th Cruiser Squadron which forced the battleship Littorio, the heavy cruisers Gorizia, Trento, one light cruiser and ten destroyers to turn away, having inflicted little serious damage to the British escorts and none to the convoy. Two of the four merchantmen were sunk by air attack near Malta and the other two were sunk at their moorings when the unloading of their cargoes had barely begun. Despite the ferrying of fighter aircraft to Malta by aircraft carrier, submarines had to be used to ferry aviation fuel and by early May the dire state of the island's food and fuel stocks meant that another convoy operation in June was unavoidable.

=== Axis convoys ===
The Axis air offensive against Malta and the losses inflicted on the Mediterranean Fleet by Italian human torpedoes of the Decima Flottiglia MAS and other losses made it much harder for the British to attack convoys to Libya. On 4 January, massed air attacks on Malta coincided with the Italian Operazione M43, six merchant ships crossing from Italy escorted six destroyers and five torpedo boats, a close escort of a battleship, four light cruisers and five destroyers and a distant escort of three battleships, two heavy cruisers and eight destroyers. Intelligence decrypts revealed to the British the timing and route of the battleship convoy, with reconnaissance reports from aircraft. Bombers from Malta and Cyrenaica missed the convoy and Force K in Malta remained in port.

The convoy arrived on 5 January, a notable Axis success; British submarine attacks on the convoy on its return journey failed. On 22 January, Operazione T18, another battleship convoy, got four of five ships to Tripoli. On 21 February in Operazione K7, three groups of merchant ships departed Italy with another elaborate battleship escort, a British air attack was defeated by German fighters on 22 February and the convoy arrived the next day. The Italians sent eleven convoys in February, thirteen of the fifteen ships arriving, 58,965 long tons (59,911 t) (99.2 per cent) of the supplies despatched being unloaded; submarines sank three of the eleven ships making the return journey.

Convoy V5 sailed on 7 March from several ports and attacks failed as they did on the return convoy. Operazione Sirio on 15 March brought four merchant ships to Tripoli on 18 March. The Regia Marina had used much of its fuel oil on the battleship convoys, when German oil deliveries had been suspended and the Italians had to return to smaller escort operations. Four ships departed Italian ports on 17 and 18 March, one hitting a mine near Tripoli and the rest arriving, the danger of attacks from Malta having diminished considerably. Fourteen convoys had sailed for Tripoli in March and eighteen of twenty ships survived the journey, 47,588 long tons (48,352 t) of supplies arrived (82.7 per cent). On 4 April, Operazione Lupo six ships in three convoys arrived at Tripoli and Operazione Aprilia delivered six merchantmen on 16 April.

The decline of Malta as an offensive base led the British to resort to submarines, which sank a light cruiser and six freighters and bombers from Egypt attacking Libyan ports. In April, 159,389 long tons (161,947 t) of supplies arrived (99.2 per cent). In May the bombers attacked Italian ports and the Italians sent lots of small convoys, 23 to Libya, 26 coastal convoys and 24 return journeys by 110 ships. On 10 May Operazione Mira covered Convoy R and Convoy G and a British attack by the 14th Destroyer Flotilla was intercepted by the Luftwaffe, which sank three of the four destroyers. In May 86,849 long tons (88,243 t) of supplies arrived in Libya (93 per cent). Italian ships were at their safest from April to mid-July 1942, convoys sailing 50 nmi (58 mi; 93 km) from Malta, escorted by a couple of aircraft.

Italian convoy deliveries to Libya
	Cargo (LT)	Fuel (LT)	% Loss	Notes
April	102,000	48,000	<1	750 anti-shipping sorties, negligible result (Note: This was a higher rate than for the previous three months. Even the new Wellington torpedo-bombers had little fuel left to find ships west of Benghazi. On 14 April an attack by eight Beaufort torpedo-bombers cost five Beauforts for no loss to the convoy.)
May	67,500	18,500	7	April–May, 13 freighters (40,000 GRT) sunk (Note: Twelve ships sunk by submarine, one shared with an aircraft.)

== Prelude ==
=== Club Runs ===
==== Operation MG 1 ====
Operation MG 1 to escort Convoy MW 10 to Malta succeeded but hardly any of the supplies reaching Malta survived Axis air attacks. Malta had been neutralised as an offensive base by the loss of 126 aircraft on the ground and twenty in the air. The RAF withdrew most of its bombers and reconnaissance aircraft and the Navy evacuated most of its ships; Axis convoys were being run to Libya with scant opposition. The demands on the Home Fleet for escorts for the Arctic Convoy PQ 16 in May 1942, led Churchill and the War Cabinet to decide that merchant ships could not be risked on Malta convoys until its air defences had been reinforced. The Air Officer Commanding, Air H.Q. Malta, Sir Hugh Lloyd wrote that

Malta's need is for Spitfires, Spitfires and still more Spitfires. And they must come in bulk, not in dribs and drabs.

Recent Club Runs to deliver aircraft from Gibraltar had been dogged by failures and inefficiency; the new 90 imp gal (410 L; 110 US gal) external fuel tanks for Spitfires had proved inadequate, forcing the cancellation of the Club Runs Operation Spotter I and Operation Picket I Club Runs. The deck of HMS Argus was too short for enough Spitfires with long-range tanks to be accommodated, Eagle was in dock for emergency repairs and the fleet carriers had lifts that were too narrow for the wingspan of Spitfires or were busy in the Indian Ocean. (Note: From 8 to 21 April, longitudinal girders were replaced under the steering gear, rubber glands were re-packed and 418 rivets were replaced around the rudder. During 1942 Eagle made nine Spitfire Club Runs.) Churchill made a request to the US president, Franklin D. Roosevelt, for the use of the American aircraft carrier, USS Wasp (Captain John W. Reeves, Jr.), that was in British waters, which Roosevelt granted.

==== Operation Calendar ====
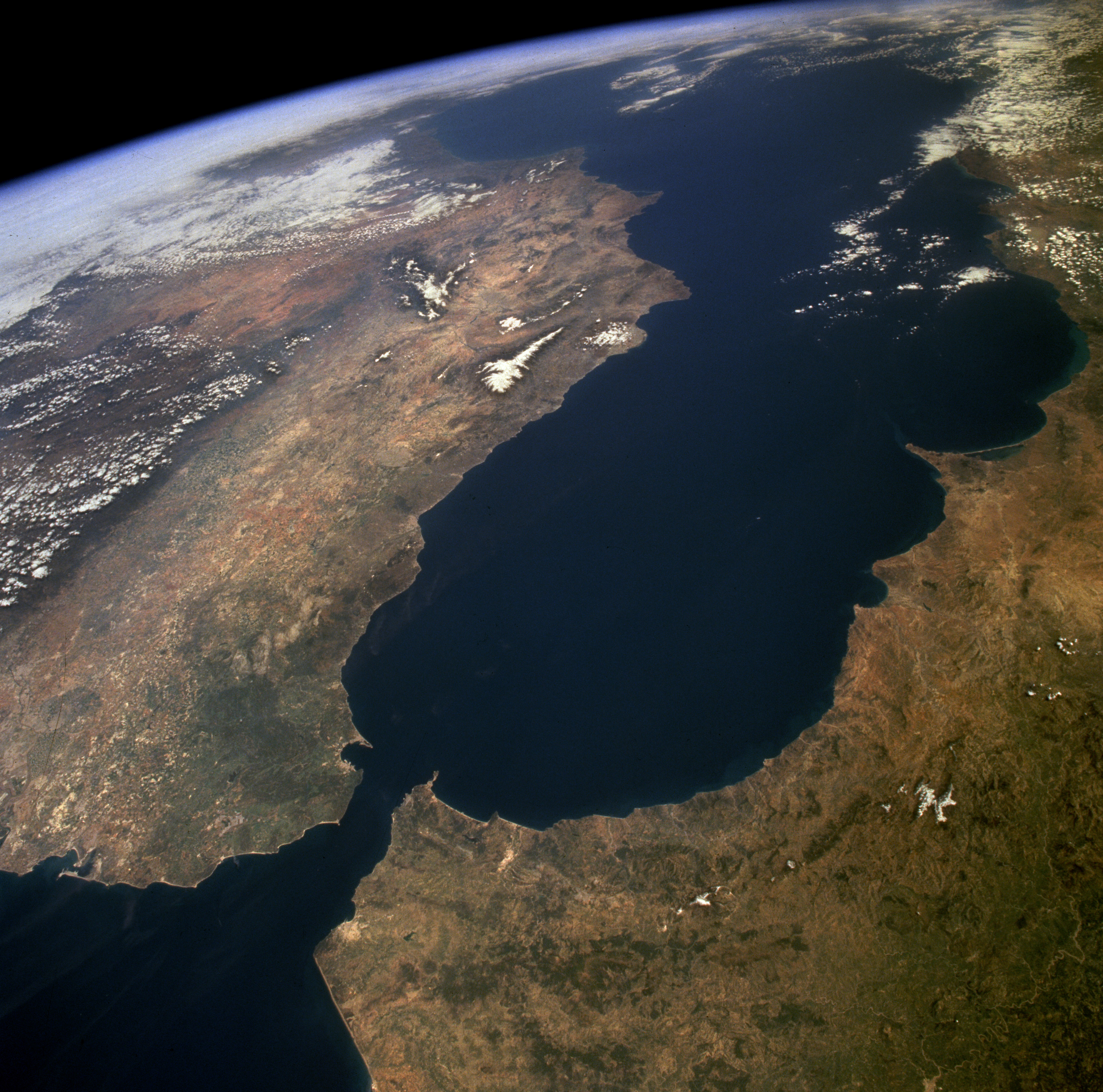
NASA Satellite photograph showing the Strait of Gibraltar and the Alboran Sea

Wasp and its destroyers USS Lang and Madison sailed for the River Clyde and by 14 April had taken on 52 Spitfires Mk Vc (trop) at King George V dock at Shieldhall with the pilots of 601 Squadron and 603 Squadron. The ships sailed that day and went west-about Ireland then sailed southwards. Wasp and its destroyers were met by the British battlecruiser HMS Renown (Captain Charles Daniel, commander Force W) and the destroyers HMS Inglefield, Ithuriel, Echo and Partridge. The ships passed the Strait of Gibraltar on the night of 18/19 April, where Force W was joined by the cruisers HMS Charybdis and Cairo and the destroyers HMS Westcott, Wishart, Vidette, Wrestler and Antelope. RAF staff officers briefed the pilots while the new long-range external tanks were attached.

The 90-gallon tanks were found to be as unserviceable as on Operation Spotter, ill-fitting and leaking large amounts of fuel, which was being siphoned off into the slipstream instead of flowing into the engine. Many of the Spitfires were discovered to have guns that were non-operational and only a quarter of the Spitfires had operational R/Ts. Covered by F4F Wildcats from Wasp, the 48 Spitfires that were airworthy, of the 52 embarked, took off for Malta on 20 April at about 20° 20' East. A US Sergeant pilot flew to Algeria and passed himself off as a "lost civilian pilot in need of repatriation". The other 47 Spitfires arrived safely but the Axis air forces were forewarned of their arrival.

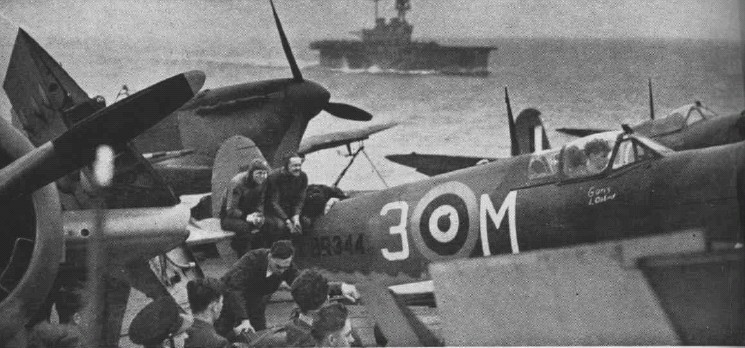
HMS Eagle seen from USS Wasp

Force W turned back, stopped briefly at Gibraltar and then returned to the Clyde, arriving on 26 April. When the Spitfires arrived at Takali, the blast pens, to protect aircraft on the ground, had been destroyed by bombing and the Luftwaffe flew 272 sorties against the Spitfires that day. Next day 27 Spitfires remained operational and by dark only 19 were serviceable. The Spitfires that lasted longest were hampered by the chronic shortage of spare parts and ground crews lacking familiarity with the type; the poor standard of the aircraft sent from Britain made this worse and the "humiliating shambles" had been witnessed by the Americans. Lloyd signalled to London that too many of the new pilots were inexperienced and that ".... only fully-experienced operational pilots must come here. It is no place for beginners".

== Operation Bowery ==
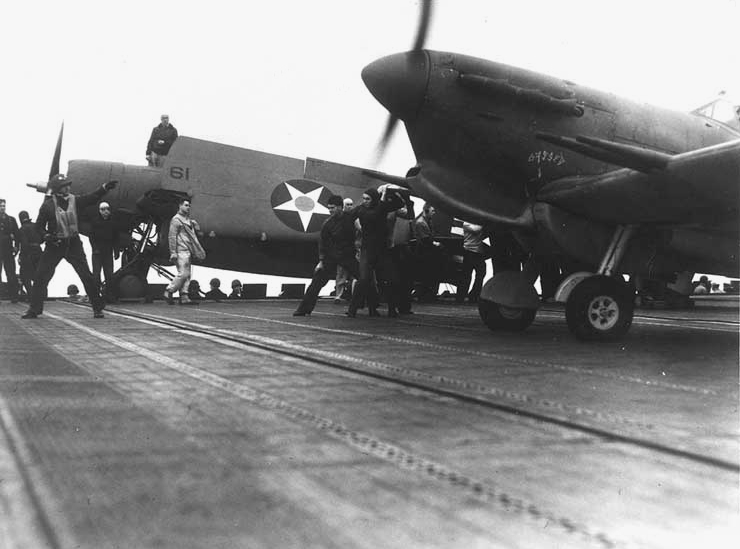
A Spitfire moments from taking off from Wasp, 9 May 1942

Wasp returned to Glasgow on 29 April 1942 and embarked another 47 Spitfires Mk Vc (trop) at Shieldhall; the aircraft had better streamlining which yielded a small but useful improvement, despite the drag of a tropical air filter. The loading arrangements were as incompetent as they had been for Operation Calendar, the condition of the aircraft was as deplorable as before and its recurrence was a serious embarrassment. The Flag Officer Glasgow reported that the situation "is unsatisfactory, and has unfortunately created a very bad impression". The long-range fuel tanks still fitted badly and leaked; many aircraft had defective R/T and poorly serviced guns; Reeves refused to continue loading until the long-range tanks had been repaired. Wasp stopped at the Tail of the Bank and its crew completed the repairs to the long-range tanks. Wasp and is destroyers Lang and Sterett sailed to Scapa Flow, still part of Force W, with Renown, the cruiser Charybdis and the destroyers Echo and Intrepid the US ships sailed from Scapa Flow on 3 May.

On the night of 7/8 May, Force W was joined from Gibraltar by Eagle, with the destroyers Ithuriel, Partridge, Westcott, Wishart, Wrestler, Antelope, Salisbury, Georgetown and Vidette. Eagle carried 17 Spitfires left over from abortive Club Runs. On 9 May 1942, eleven of Wasp's Wildcats rose to cover 64 Spitfires as they took off from Wasp and Eagle, 61 arriving at Malta. The 23rd Spitfire to take off from Wasp had failed to gain sufficient flying speed, its propeller being set in coarse pitch by mistake, fell off the flight deck and was cut in two by the bow of the carrier, killing the Canadian pilot, Sergeant R. D. Sherrington. Another Canadian, Pilot Officer Jerry Smith, found that he had a faulty fuel pump and landed on Wasp the second time around, stopping the Spitfire 6 ft (1.8 m) short of the end of the flight deck. A Spitfire was lost en route to Malta but the other sixty-one Spitfires landed at Luqa and Takali between 10:20 a.m. and 11:00 a.m.

After the fiasco of the Operation Calendar Spitfires, the reception arrangements for the Bowery Spitfires were much improved. The aircraft circled at low altitude covered by light anti-aircraft guns as they waited their turn to land. Manpower and material for quick repairs to runways had been substantially increased and as each Spitfire landed, it was met by its numbered runner, who directed the pilot to a particular blast pen, the Spitfire rapidly to be refuelled, rearmed, its slipper tank detached and the ferry pilot replaced by an experienced pilot, intended to be ready to fly in ten minutes. Ammunition rationing was lifted during the arrivals and while the Abdiel-class, fast minelayer HMS Welshman (Captain William Friedberger) was in harbour. The first Spitfires arrived at 10:30 a.m. and about half of them were airborne by 11:00 a.m. when Luftwaffe aircraft tried to catch them on the ground as they had the Calendar Spitfires. For a loss of three Spitfires, 37 Axis aircraft were shot down or damaged; the air battle on 10 May becoming known as the Battle of Malta. The anticipated big bombing raid at dusk did not occur.

=== HMS Welshman ===
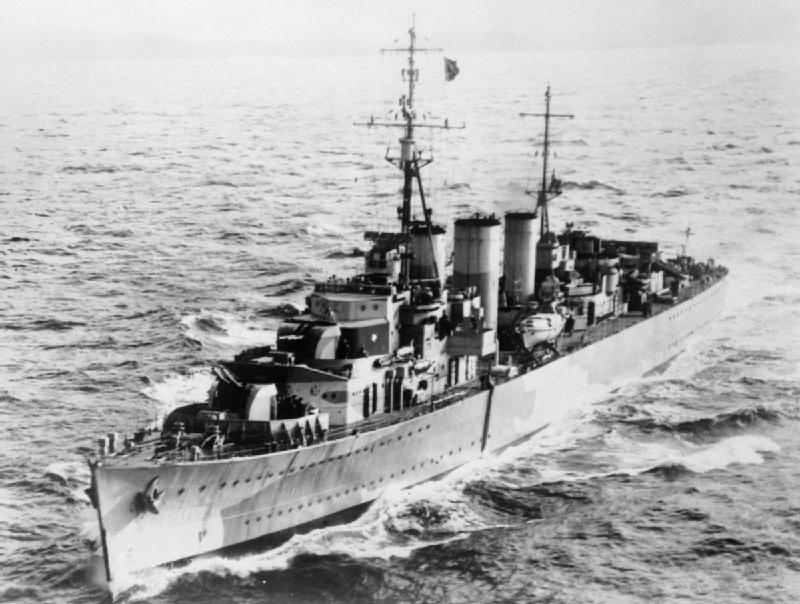
The fast minelayer HMS Welshman

Welshman was ordered to make a solo run to Malta. Churchill said "... we may well lose this ship ... but in view of the emergency ... there appears to be no alternative". At Gibraltar on 7 May, the ship embarked some unusual items, along with 340 long tons (350 t) of medical stores, other supplies and food, 72 crates of smoke-screen chemicals, 100 spare Merlin aircraft engines and 120 passengers, most being RAF ground crews trained on Spitfires. During the night the unusual items were unwrapped, they turned out to be plywood bulkheads for the superstructure and cowls to be put on top of the funnels. At 3:00 a.m. on 8 May. Welshman continued its voyage, independent of Force W, disguised as the French destroyer Léopard. Early on 9 May, the Spitfires passed overhead and at 10:00 a.m. a Junkers Ju 88 (Ju 88) inspected the ship as the turrets faced forward and a couple of crewmen loafing around gave the aircraft a wave as it made a low pass and flew away. A British Catalina appeared, then another Ju 88 checked the ship.

Between Galita and the Tunisian coast a Vichy French seaplane flew by and the ship received a challenge from a land station but Welshman kept going. As dark fell, the navigator, Lieutenant-Commander Lindsay Gellatly (RAN), plotted a route to Malta as Welshman accelerated to about 28 kn (32 mph; 52 km/h). Gellatly guided the ship through shoals to the south of Cape Bon then rounded Pantellaria, turning eastwards towards Malta, the island coming into view two minutes before the sun appeared. The trawler Beryl met Welshman off Delimara Point and led it close to shore along a route used by fishing boats, to avoid mines. Welshman rounded Ricasoli Point and its starboard paravane severed two mines from their moorings, which passed close by the stern without exploding. As soon as Welshman entered Grand Harbour a smoke screen was raised from the canisters on the ship. When the Axis bombers attacked, Welshman was showered by wreckage from bomb explosions nearby, 4 long tons (4.1 t) of girders were blown onto the forward Oerlikon 20 mm cannon, bomb splinters punctured the hull above the water line and the deck plates were buckled but the cargo was unloaded. After refuelling, Welshman departed from Valetta at 8:00 p.m. following the last operational minesweeper, then raced for Gibraltar, arriving on 12 May.

== Aftermath ==
=== Analysis ===
Stephen Roskill, the naval official historian, wrote in 1962 that though the Club Runs by Eagle and the two by Wasp were vital to the survival of Malta by creating the conditions for a convoy operation, they had no effect on the lack of supplies. In 2003, Richard Woodman wrote that the safe delivery of Spitfires, ground crews and spare parts were only the start of the attempt to revive Malta as an offensive base. The mid-June deadline given by Dobbie for the exhaustion of the food on the island remained and could only be met by the delivery of substantial supplies of food, fuel, ammunition and equipment brought by sea.

=== Subsequent operations ===
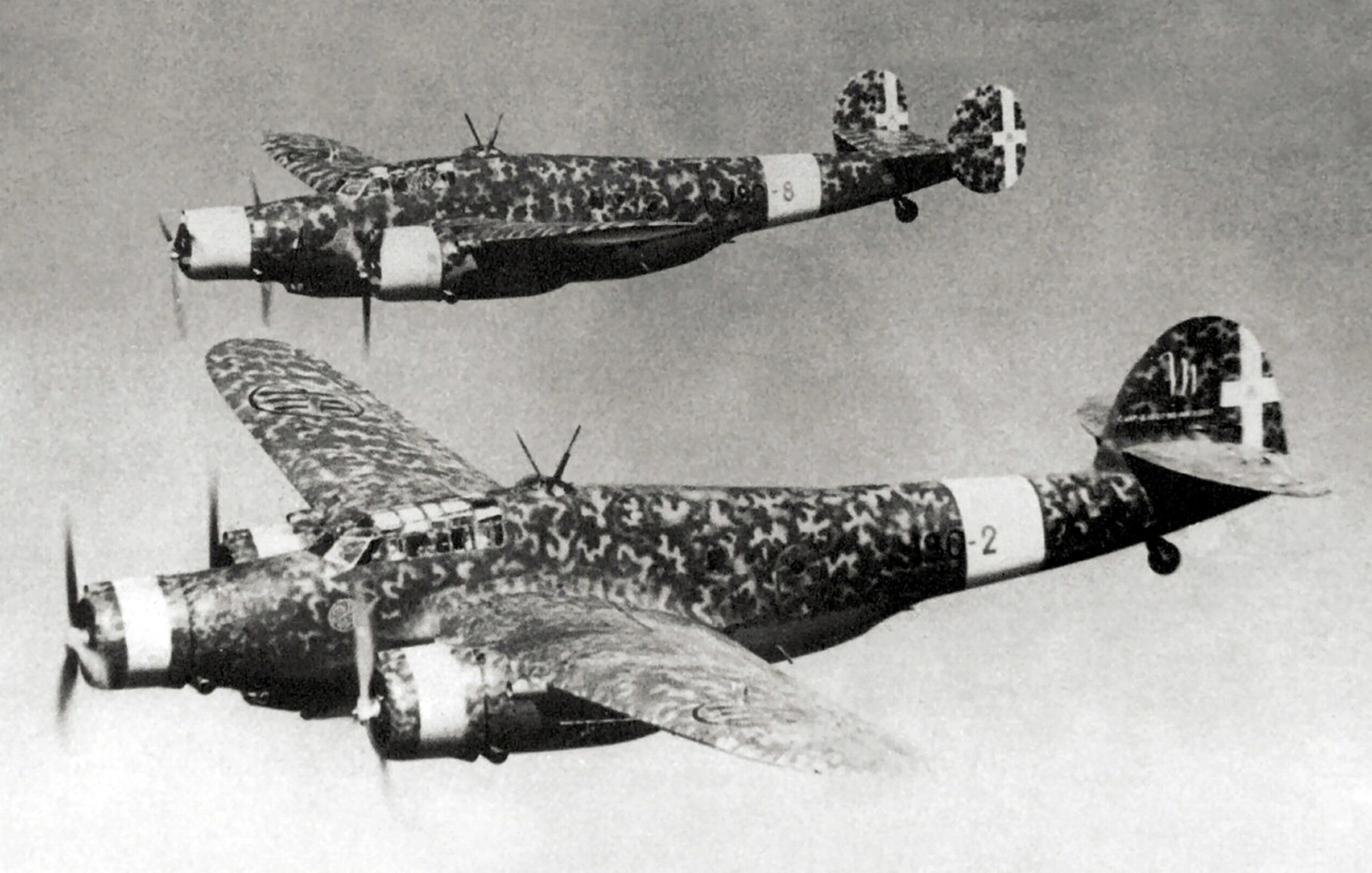
Two CANT Z.1007 bis similar to those flying against Malta in 1942

Attempts had been made to recover oil from Breconshire, sunk at its moorings after arriving in Convoy MW 10 in March. A hole was made in the underside of the ship for a suction pipe but on 3 May only 22 long tons (22 t) of fuel oil was pumped out due to water seepage. On 4 May one of the oil lighters being used for the extracted oil was bombed and sunk and by the end of the month 47 long tons (48 t) more had been extracted but it had to be moved in barrels after all of the oil lighters had been sunk. Lack of fuel oil reduced the amount of local patrolling and German Schnellboote (E-boats to the British) laid more mines, despite two being sunk. To receive a large enough convoy to end the food, fuel and supply shortages at Malta, Eagle delivered 17 Spitfires in Operation LB on 18 May, 32 in Operation Style on 3 June (27 arrived) and 32 in Operation Salient on 7 June. Three submarines delivered aviation spirit, paraffin and ammunition during the period.

==== Operation Julius ====
A big supply operation for Malta, Operation Julius, was planned for June. Eleven merchant ships were to reach Malta from Alexandria (Operation Vigorous) and six more from Gibraltar (Operation Harpoon). The convoy from Gibraltar sailed on 12 June, supported by Force H but on 15 June when the main body of Force H had turned back at the Sicilian Narrows, the convoy was attacked by ships and aircraft, that sank three of the freighters. More ships were mined and sunk off Malta and only two cargo ships reached port. Vigorous, handicapped by the lack of battleships and aircraft carriers, turned away from Malta on 14 June, after losing two merchant ships and two being damaged by Ju 87 and Ju 88 bombers; a cruiser and a destroyer were sunk by the 3rd S-Boat Flotilla. On 15 June, when the Italian battlefleet was spotted heading towards the convoy, it was ordered to return to Alexandria.

==== Operation Pedestal ====
By late July, the 10th Submarine Flotilla had returned to Malta and in August a convoy sailed from Britain, the largest yet attempted to Malta. Several subsidiary operations took place, including a diversionary operation by the Mediterranean Fleet and another Club Run Operation Bellows. On 11 August the aircraft carrier HMS Illustrious dispatched 37 Spitfires to Malta; the carrier Eagle, veteran of so many Club Runs was sunk by German submarine U-73 the same day. The escort for the convoy comprised three fleet aircraft carriers, two battleships, seven cruisers and 24 destroyers. Axis naval and air forces made a maximum effort with ships, submarines and aircraft, managing to sink all but four of the freighters and the tanker Ohio. Despite the severe losses, 31,000 long tons (32,000 t) of supplies and 15,000 long tons (15,000 t) of fuel reached Malta which revived Malta as an offensive base.

== Orders of battle ==
=== Scotland to Gibraltar ===
Force W
Ship	Flag	Type	Notes
USS Wasp	United States Navy	Yorktown-class aircraft carrier	
HMS Renown	Royal Navy	Renown-class battlecruiser	Commodore Charles Daniel
HMS Charybdis	Royal Navy	Dido-class cruiser	
USS Lang	United States Navy	Benham-class destroyer	
USS Sterett	United States Navy	Benham-class destroyer	
HMS Echo	Royal Navy	E-class destroyer	
HMS Intrepid	Royal Navy	I-class destroyer	

=== Gibraltar towards Malta ===
Force W
Ship	Flag	Type	Notes
USS Wasp	United States Navy	Yorktown-class aircraft carrier	
HMS Eagle	Royal Navy	Battleship conversion	
HMS Renown	Royal Navy	Renown-class battlecruiser	
HMS Charybdis	Royal Navy	Dido-class cruiser	
HMS Antelope	Royal Navy	A-class destroyer	
USS Lang	United States Navy	Benham-class destroyer	
USS Sterett	United States Navy	Benham-class destroyer	
HMS Echo	Royal Navy	E-class destroyer	
HMS Intrepid	Royal Navy	I-class destroyer	
HMS Ithuriel	Royal Navy	I-class destroyer	
HMS Partridge	Royal Navy	P-class destroyer	
HMS Vidette	Royal Navy	V-class destroyer	
HMS Westcott	Royal Navy	W-class destroyer	
HMS Wishart	Royal Navy	W-class destroyer	
HMS Wrestler	Royal Navy	W-class destroyer	
Georgetown	Royal Navy	Wickes-class destroyer	
Salisbury	Royal Navy	Wickes-class destroyer	
