= HMS Partridge =

Several ships of the British Royal Navy have been named HMS Partridge, after the bird.

- HMS Partridge (1809) was an 18-gun sloop launched at Dartmouth on 15 July 1809 and broken up in September 1816.
- HMS Partridge (1822) was a 10-gun Cherokee-class brig-sloop launched at Plymouth Dockyard on 22 March 1822 and stranded aground off the Dutch island of Vlieland on 28 November 1824.
- HMS Partridge (1829) was another 10-gun Cherokee-class brig-sloop, launched at Pembroke on 12 October 1829. Recommissioned as a coastguard watchvessel (WV32) on 25 May 1863 the ship was sold at Southampton on 2 February 1864.
- HMS Partridge (1856) was an Albacore-class wooden screw gunboat launched at Nartham on 29 March 1856 and sold for breaking up on 8 September 1864.
- HMS Partridge (1888) was a composite screw gunboat launched at Devonport Dockyard on 10 May 1888 and sold in 1909.
- HMS Partridge (1914) – Launched 1906 as mercantile Partridge. Armed boarding steamer from 15 November 1914. Action with a U-boat on 15 March 1915. HMS Partridge (II) from 1916 to 12 July 1920.
- HMS Partridge (1916) was an Admiralty M-class destroyer launched on 4 March 1916 and sunk by German destroyers in the North Sea on 12 December 1917.
- HMS Partridge (G30) was a P-class destroyer launched at Govan on 5 August 1941 and sunk by the German submarine U-565 commanded by Wilhelm Franken in the Mediterranean on 18 December 1942.
- Partridge was a sloop ordered from J. I. Thorneycroft & Co on 9 October 1944 but cancelled in October 1945.
