= U73 =

U73 may refer to:

- German submarine U-73
- Great rhombidodecahedron
- HMAS Warrego (U73), a sloop of the Royal Australian Navy
- Small nucleolar RNA SNORD73
- Uppland Runic Inscription 73
- U73, a line of the Düsseldorf Stadtbahn
