= U22 =

U22 may refer to:

== Naval vessels ==
- German submarine U-22, various vessels
- HMS Folkestone (U22), a sloop of the Royal Navy
- SM U-22 (Austria-Hungary), a submarine of the Austro-Hungarian Navy

== Other uses ==
- U22 (album), by Irish rock band U2
- Beretta U22 Neos, a pistol
- Beechcraft QU-22 Pave Eagle, an American utility aircraft
- Small nucleolar RNA SNORD22
- Uppland Runic Inscription 22
