= Italian destroyer Vincenzo Gioberti =

Destroyer of the Regia Marina

Coordinates: 44°04′00″N 9°23′00″E

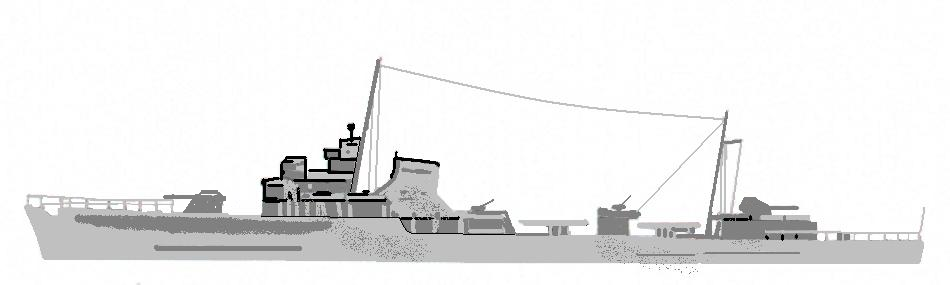
- Vincenzo Gioberti

History

Kingdom of Italy
- Name: Vincenzo Gioberti
- Namesake: Vincenzo Gioberti
- Builder: O.T.O., Livorno
- Laid down: 2 January 1936
- Launched: 19 September 1936
- Completed: 27 October 1937
- Fate: Sunk by HMS Simoon, 9 August 1943

General characteristics (as built)
- Class & type: Oriani-class destroyer
- Displacement: 1,700–1,750 long tons (1,730–1,780 t) (standard); 2,400–2,450 long tons (2,440–2,490 t) (full load)
- Length: 106.7 m (350 ft 1 in) (o/a)
- Beam: 10.15 m (33 ft 4 in)
- Draught: 3.42–4.8 m (11 ft 3 in – 15 ft 9 in)
- Installed power: 3 Thornycroft boilers; 48,000 hp (36,000 kW)
- Propulsion: 2 shafts; 2 geared steam turbines
- Speed: 32–33 knots (59–61 km/h; 37–38 mph)
- Range: 2,600–2,800 nmi (4,800–5,200 km; 3,000–3,200 mi) at 18 knots (33 km/h; 21 mph)
- Complement: 206
- Armament: 2 × twin 120 mm (4.7 in) guns; 2 × single 120 mm (4.7 in) star shell guns; 4 × twin 13.2 mm (0.52 in) machine guns; 2 × triple 533 mm (21 in) torpedo tubes; 56 mines

Vincenzo Gioberti was one of four Oriani-class destroyers built for the Regia Marina (Royal Italian Navy) in the mid-1930s and early 1940s. Completed in 1937, she served in World War II. She was sunk on 9 August 1943 by the Royal Navy submarine HMS Simoon, and was the last Regia Marina destroyer to be lost in the war against the Allies.

== Design and description ==
The Oriani-class destroyers were slightly improved versions of the preceding Maestrale class. They had a length between perpendiculars of 101.6 meters (333 ft 4 in) and an overall length of 106.7 meters (350 ft 1 in). The ships had a beam of 10.15 meters (33 ft 4 in) and a mean draft of 3.15 meters (10 ft 4 in) and 4.3 meters (14 ft 1 in) at deep load. They displaced 1,700–1,750 metric tons (1,670–1,720 long tons) at normal load, and 2,400–2,450 metric tons (2,360–2,410 long tons) at deep load. Their complement during wartime was 206 officers and enlisted men.

The Orianis were powered by two Parsons geared steam turbines, each driving one propeller shaft using steam supplied by three Thornycroft boilers. Designed for a maximum output of 48,000 shaft horsepower (36,000 kW) and a speed of 32–33 knots (59–61 km/h; 37–38 mph) in service, the ships reached speeds of 38–39 knots (70–72 km/h; 44–45 mph) during their sea trials while lightly loaded. They carried enough fuel oil to give them a range of 2,600–2,800 nautical miles (4,800–5,200 km; 3,000–3,200 mi) at a speed of 18 knots (33 km/h; 21 mph) and 690 nmi (1,280 km; 790 mi) at a speed of 33 knots (61 km/h; 38 mph).

Their main battery consisted of four 50-caliber 120-millimeter (4.7 in) guns in two twin-gun turrets, one each fore and aft of the superstructure. Amidships were a pair of 15-caliber 120-millimeter star shell guns. Anti-aircraft (AA) defense for the Oriani-class ships was provided by four 13.2-millimeter (0.52 in) machine guns. The ships were equipped with six 533-millimeter (21 in) torpedo tubes in two triple mounts amidships. Although they were not provided with a sonar system for anti-submarine work, they were fitted with a pair of depth charge throwers. The ships could carry 56 mines.

== Fate ==
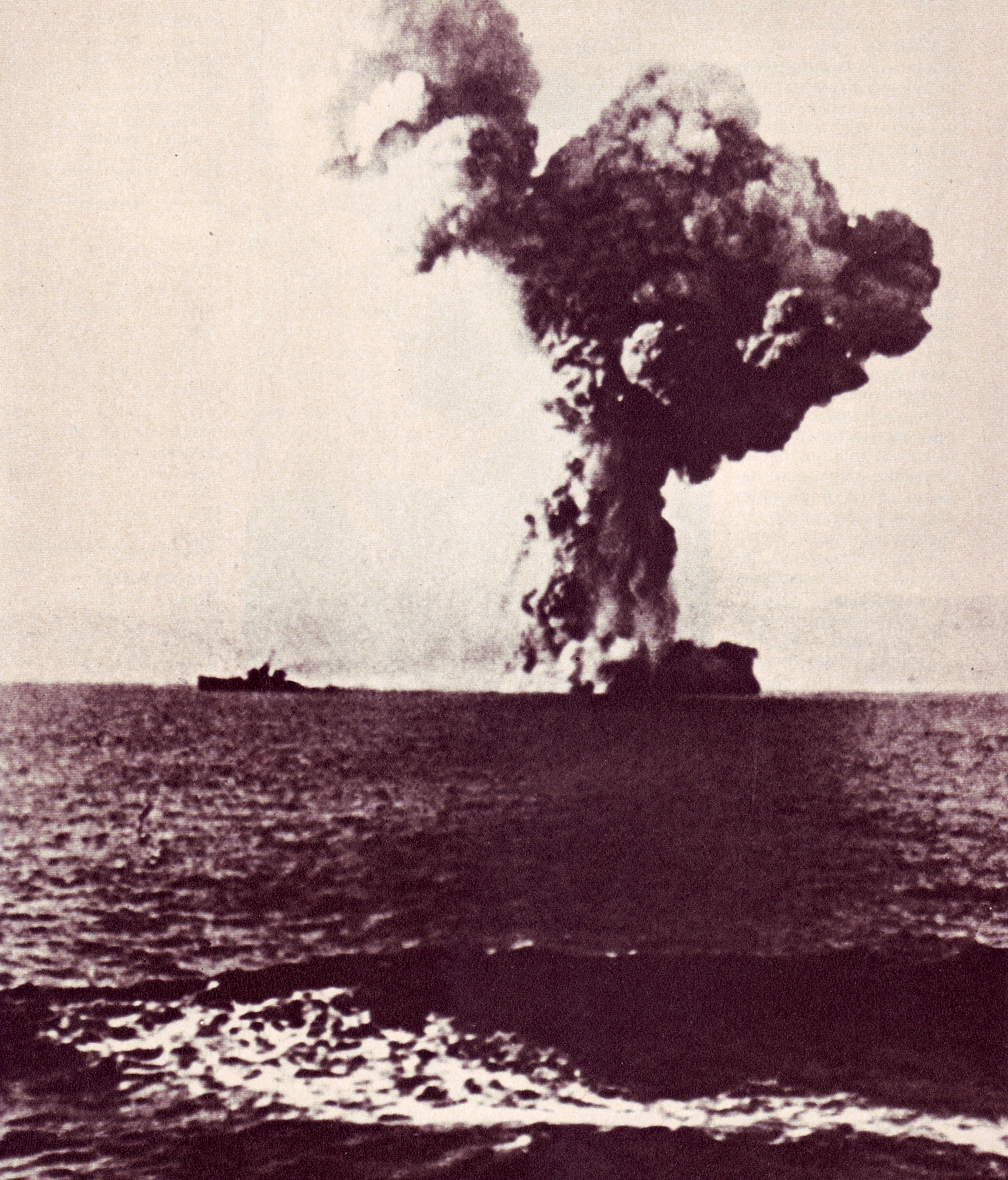
Vincenzo Gioberti blowing up after being hit by torpedoes from Simoom

Vincenzo Gioberti had conducted 216 war patrols, and had travelled some 74,071 nautical miles.

On 9 August 1943, Vincenzo Gioberti was with the cruiser Italian cruiser Giuseppe Garibaldi along with several light cruisers and destroyers passing just west of Punta Mesco near the port of La Spezia. The Royal Navy submarine HMS Simoon spotted the Giuseppe Garibaldi and fired three torpedoes at her, but missed and instead two hit Vincenzo Gioberti. The stern magazine detonated and exploded, and the destroyer broke into two pieces. 105 officers and men died, while 171 were rescued. She was the last Regia Marina destroyer to be lost in the war against the Allies.

The bow section went on and sank about one mile away from the impact, the wreck of which is located at a depth of about 600 metres.

== Bibliography ==
- Akermann, Paul (2002). Encyclopaedia of British Submarines 1901–1955 (reprint of the 1989 ed.). Penzance, Cornwall: Periscope Publishing. ISBN 978-1-904381-05-1.
- Brescia, Maurizio (2012). Mussolini's Navy: A Reference Guide to the Regina Marina 1930–45. Annapolis, Maryland: Naval Institute Press. ISBN 978-1-59114-544-8.
- Fraccaroli, Aldo (1968). Italian Warships of World War II. Shepperton, UK: Ian Allan. ISBN 0-7110-0002-6.
- Roberts, John (1980). "Italy". In Chesneau, Roger (ed.). Conway's All the World's Fighting Ships 1922–1946. New York: Mayflower Books. pp. 280–317. ISBN 0-8317-0303-2.
- Rohwer, Jürgen (2005). Chronology of the War at Sea 1939–1945: The Naval History of World War Two (Third Revised ed.). Annapolis, Maryland: Naval Institute Press. ISBN 1-59114-119-2.
- Whitley, M. J. (1988). Destroyers of World War 2: An International Encyclopedia. Annapolis, Maryland: Naval Institute Press. ISBN 1-85409-521-8.
