= German submarine U-23 =

U-23 may refer to one of the following German submarines:

- SM U-23 (Germany), was the lead ship of the Type U 23 class of submarines; launched in 1913 and served in the First World War until sunk on 20 July 1915
  - During the First World War, Germany also had these submarines with similar names:
    - SM UB-23, a Type UB II submarine launched in 1915 and interned in Spain 29 July 1917
    - SM UC-23, a Type UC II submarine launched in 1916 and surrendered on 25 November 1918
- German submarine U-23 (1936), a Type IIB submarine that served in the Second World War until scuttled on 10 September 1944
- German submarine U-23 (S172), a Type 206 submarine of the Bundesmarine that was launched in 1974 and sold after decommissioning to Columbia where she serves as ARC Intrépido.

U-23 or U-XXIII may also refer to:

- SM U-23 (Austria-Hungary), a U-20-class submarine of the Austro-Hungarian Navy
