= HMS Banka =

Minesweeper of the Royal Navy

HMS Banka was a British minesweeper which was officially sunk on 9 December 1941 (but in reality probably the night of the 7 December 1941) by a mine off the coast of Malaysia. Its crew of four British officers and 40 Malays all died with the exception of six Malay crew.

It had been deployed to assist the British, Australian and Indian land forces in stopping the Japanese invasion of Malaya.

HMS Banka's final resting position is at 57m, 12 nm NE of Tioman Is. near the two sunken Dutch submarines (O 16 and K XVII) on the same mine line laid by Japanese ship Tatsumiya Maru. On 6 December 1941 IJN Minelayer Tatsumiya Maru laid a line of 456 mines from North of Tioman to the Anambas Islands.

She most likely struck the mine on the night of 7 December, just one day after the field was laid. As she was recalled (from East Malay coast) on 6 December and was overdue in Singapore on 9 December. According to the survivor accounts it was dark at the time of the explosion.

== Crew ==
	Name	Position	Age	Official Date of Death	cross reference multiple sources
1	Arthur Earnest Stephenson	Temp. Lieut. RNR (Captain)	40	10 December 1941	Y
2	J.R. Smith	Temp. Lieut. RNR (Engineer)	53	10 December 1941	Y
3	R.E. Scales	S/Lieut. SS RNVR (explosives — New Zealand miner based in Malaysia)		10 December 1941	Y
4	R.W. Emerson	T S/Lieut. RNR		10 December 1941	Y
5	Arshad Bin Arabi	Quartermaster	36	10 December 1941	Y
6	Awang Bin Kassim	First Engineman	40	10 December 1941	Y
7	Dawi Bin Sayid	Seaman	40	10 December 1941	y
8	Din Bin Ali	Fireman	38	10 December 1941	y
9	Hamid Bin Sa’ad	Seaman	26	10 December 1941	Y
10	Jantan Bin Repin	Deck Cook's Mate	61	10 December 1941	Y
11	Junid Bin Asa	Deck Cook's Mate	20	10 December 1941	Y
12	Kaseh Bin Hassan	Deck Cook	24	10 December 1941	
13	M. Nasu B.H Yusuf	Gunner	37	10 December 1941	Y
14	Madar Bin Bakong	Fireman		10 December 1941	Y
15	Manaf Bin Yatim	Deck Cook's Mate		10 December 1941	
16	Minsuri Bin Malik	Seaman	27	10 December 1941	Y
17	Rawi Bin Biju	Fireman's Serang	44	10 December 1941	Y
18	Saleh Bin Taib	Fireman	34	10 December 1941	
19	Sawal Bin Sandang	Engine Driver		10 December 1941	
20	Shamsi Bin Saleh	Seaman	33	10 December 1941	
21	Adnan Bin Hahran	Seaman	19	10 December 1941	y
22	Abdullah Bin Badrom				Possible survivor
23	Ahmad Bin Nawi				Possible survivor
24	Foo See Chow				Possible survivor
25	Mak Kwang				Possible survivor

§

== Gallery ==
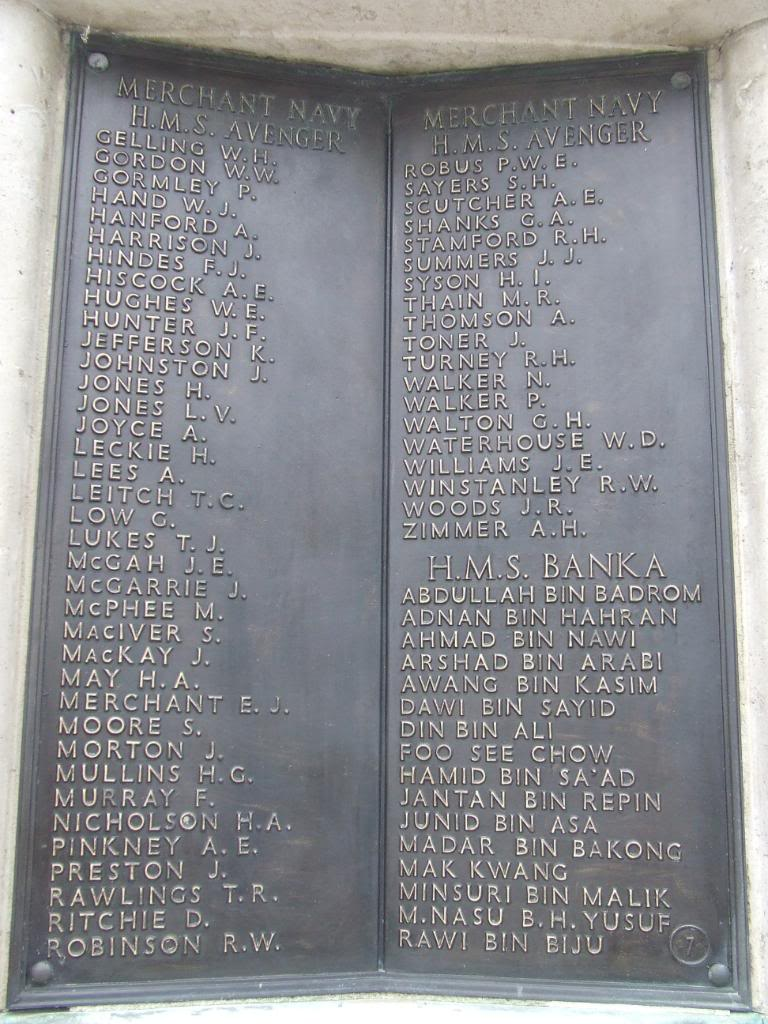
Memorial for Malay crew

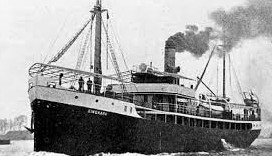
HMS Banka when she was a day cruiser called Singkara

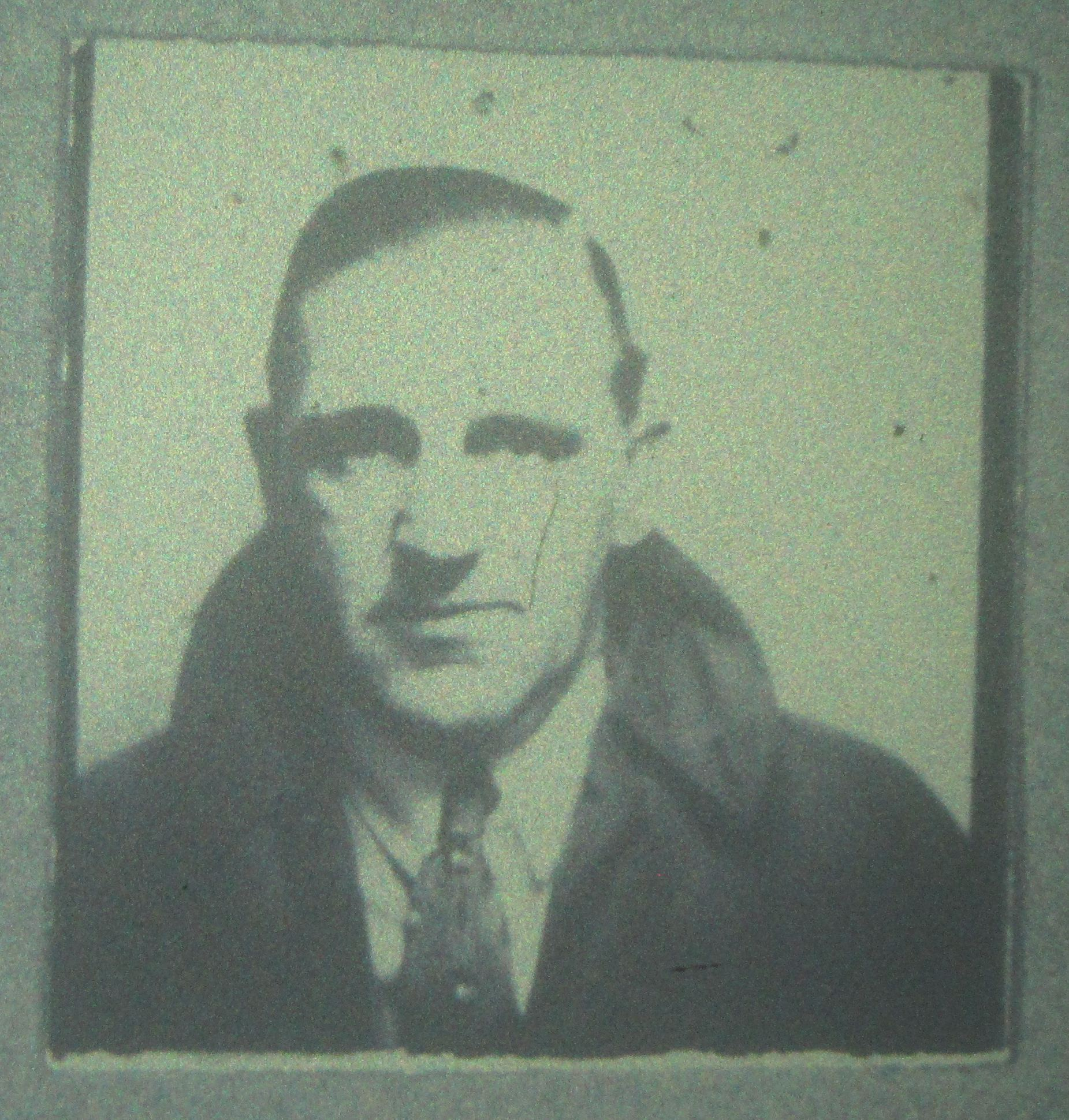
AE Stephenson

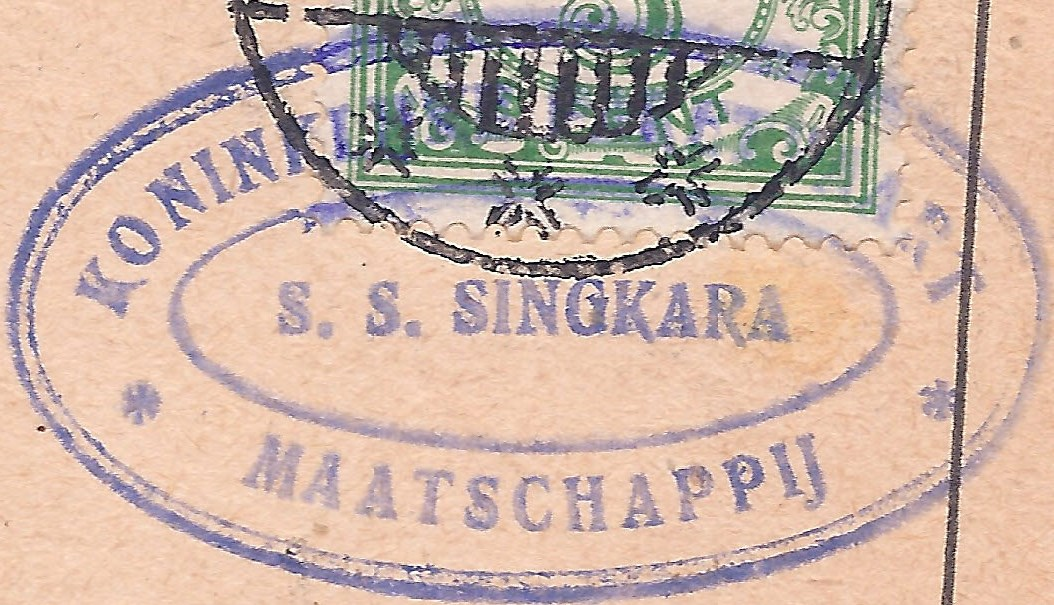
day cruise ticket
