= German submarine U-22 =

U-22 may refer to one of the following German submarines:

- SM U-22 (Germany), was a Type U 19 submarine launched in 1913 and that served in the First World War until surrendered on 1 December 1918
  - During the First World War, Germany also had these submarines with similar names:
    - SM UB-22, a Type UB II submarine launched in 1915 and sunk 19 January 1918
    - SM UC-22, a Type UC II submarine launched in 1916 and surrendered on 3 February 1919
- German submarine U-22 (1936), a Type IIB submarine that served in the Second World War and went missing 27 March 1940
- German submarine U-22 (S171), a Type 206 submarine of the Bundesmarine that was launched in 1974 and still in service
