= German submarine U-73 =

U-73 may refer to one of the following German submarines:

- SM U-73, a Type UE I submarine launched in 1915 and that served in World War I until scuttled on 30 October 1918
  - During World War I, Germany also had these submarines with similar names:
    - SM UB-73, a Type UB III submarine launched in 1917 and surrendered on 21 November 1918; broken up at Brest, France, in July 1921
    - SM UC-73, a Type UC II submarine launched in 1916 and surrendered on 6 January 1919; broken up at Briton Ferry in 1919–20
- German submarine U-73, a Type VIIB submarine that served in World War II until sunk on 16 December 1943
