= HMS Partridge (G30) =

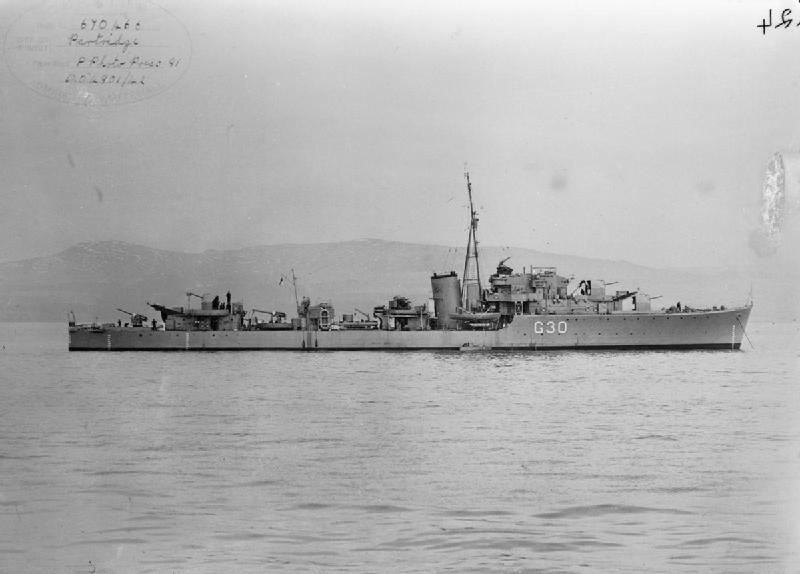
- Partridge at anchor

History

United Kingdom
- Name: HMS Partridge
- Ordered: 2 October 1939
- Builder: Fairfield Shipbuilding and Engineering Company, Govan
- Laid down: 3 June 1940
- Launched: 5 August 1941
- Completed: 22 February 1942
- Fate: Torpedoed and sunk, 18 December 1942

General characteristics
- Class & type: P-class destroyer
- Displacement: 1,550 long tons (1,570 t) standard
- Length: 345 ft (105.16 m) o/a
- Beam: 35 ft (10.67 m)
- Draught: 9 ft (2.74 m)
- Installed power: 40,000 shp (30,000 kW); 2 × Admiralty 3-drum boilers
- Propulsion: 2 shafts; Parsons geared steam turbines
- Speed: 36.75 knots (68.06 km/h; 42.29 mph)
- Range: 3,850 nmi (7,130 km; 4,430 mi) at 20 knots (37 km/h; 23 mph)
- Complement: 228
- Armament: 5 × single QF 4 in Mk.V (102 mm) guns; 1 × quadruple QF 2-pdr Mk.VIII AA guns; 4 × Oerlikon 20 mm cannon; 1 × quadruple 21-inch torpedo tubes; 4 × throwers and 2 × racks for 70 depth charges

HMS Partridge was a P-class destroyer of the Royal Navy. The O-class were intermediate destroyers, designed before the outbreak of the Second World War to meet likely demands for large number of destroyers. They had a main gun armament of four 4.7 in (120 mm) guns, and had a design speed of 36 kn (41 mph; 67 km/h). Partridge was built by Fairfield Shipbuilding and Engineering Company at their Govan, Scotland shipyard, launching on 5 August 1941 and completing on 22 February 1942.

Partridge served mainly in the Mediterranean Sea during the war, taking part in the Malta convoy Harpoon in June 1942. She was torpedoed and sunk by the German submarine U-565 west of Oran on 18 December 1942.

== Design ==
The P-class (and the preceding O-class) destroyers were designed prior to the outbreak of the Second World War to meet the Royal navy's need for large numbers of destroyers in the event of war occurring. They were an intermediate between the large destroyers designed for fleet operations (such as the Tribal-class) and the smaller and slower Hunt-class escort destroyers. It was originally planned for both classes of destroyers to have a main gun armament of 4.7 inch (120 mm ) guns, but supply problems with the 4.7 inch mounts resulted in the decision to complete the eight P-class ships with 4-inch (102 mm) dual purpose (capable of both anti-ship and anti-aircraft fire) guns.

Partridge was 345 ft (105.16 m) long overall, 337 ft (102.72 m) at the waterline and 328 ft 9 in (100.20 m) between perpendiculars, with a beam of 35 ft (10.67 m) and a draught of 9 ft (2.74 m) mean and 13 ft 6 in (4.11 m) full load. Displacement was 1,550 long tons (1,570 t) standard and 2,250 long tons (2,290 t) full load. Two Admiralty three-drum boilers fed steam at 300 psi (2,100 kPa) and 620 °F (327 °C) to two sets of Parsons single-reduction geared steam turbines which drove two propeller shafts. The machinery was rated at 40,000 shp (30,000 kW) giving a maximum speed of 36.75 kn (42.3 mph; 68.1 km/h), corresponding to 33 kn (38 mph; 61 km/h) at deep load 500 long tons (510 t) of oil was carried, giving a radius of 3,850 nmi (4,430 mi; 7,130 km) at 20 kn (23 mph; 37 km/h). The ship had a crew of 176 officers and men.

Partridge had a main gun armament of five 4-inch (102 mm) QF Mark V anti-aircraft guns in single mounts. (Note: Mark III guns according to English.) Close-in anti-aircraft armament of one quadruple 2-pounder "pom-pom" mount together with four single Oerlikon 20 mm cannon, with two on the bridge wings and two further aft abreast the searchlight platform. A single quadruple 21-inch (533 mm) torpedo tubes was carried. (Note: Although a second bank of four tubes could be fitted at the expense of one of the 4-inch guns, this modification was not carried out on Partridge.) Four depth charge throwers were fitted, with 70 depth charges carried.

== Service history ==
The ship was ordered as part of the Second Emergency Flotilla on 2 October 1939, at a contract price of £404,046 (excluding government provided equipment such as armament), and was laid down at Fairfield Shipbuilding and Engineering Company's Govan shipyard on 3 June 1940, was launched on 5 August 1941 and completed on 22 February 1942 with the Pennant number G30.

After commissioning and workup, Partridge was deployed to Gibraltar in April 1942, and was attached to Force H. She was part of the escort for the American aircraft carrier USS Wasp in Operation Calendar, during which 47 Supermarine Spitfire fighter aircraft were flown off Wasp on 20 April 1942 to reinforce the fighter defences of Malta. 46 of the Spitfires reached Malta. The requirement for reinforcement of Malta's defences continued, and 8–9 May Partridge was an escort in Operation Bowery, when Wasp and the British carrier Eagle flew off 64 Spitfires. On 17–20 May 1942, Force H, including Partridge escorted Eagle as she flew off a further 17 Spitfires to Malta, and on 7–9 June, when Eagle flew off a further 32 Spitfires.

From 12 June, Partridge took part in Operation Harpoon, one of two supply convoys planned to be run to Malta simultaneously from the west and east, with Harpoon setting out from Gibraltar, while Operation Vigorous ran from Egypt. Partridge formed part of the close escort for Harpoon, intended to escort the convoy all the way to Malta. The convoy came under heavy air attack from Italian and German aircraft on 14 June, which were fended off with the loss of one merchant ship and damage to the cruiser Liverpool, with the covering force leaving the convoy as planned on the evening of 14 June as the convoy reached the Strait of Sicily. On 15 June, the air attacks on the remaining ships of the convoy continued, while at the same time, an Italian force of two cruisers (Raimondo Montecuccoli, Eugenio di Savoia) and five destroyers (Ascari, Alfredo Oriani, Lanzerotto Malocello, Premuda and Ugolino Vivaldi) attempted to attack the convoy. In response, the five British fleet destroyers remaining with the convoy (Bedouin, Ithuriel, Marne, Matchless and Partridge attacked the more powerful Italian force, while the remainder of the convoy steered away. Partridge was hit three times by Italian shells, and was temporarily immobilised by steam leaks in the engine room, while Bedouin was also heavily hit and immobilised, but the British ships managed to drive off the Italian attack. Partridge and Bedouin could not keep up with the convoy and were ordered to return to Gibraltar, with Partridge, which had managed to restore some power, taking Bedouin under tow. Later that day, however, the Italian cruisers again approached, forcing Partridge to abandon the attempt to tow Bedouin, which was sunk by an Italian torpedo bomber. Partridge, while further damaged by Italian air attacks, managed to survive, reaching Gibraltar on 17 June.

Partridge was under repair at the Wallsend Slipway & Engineering Company on Tyneside, England until August 1942. She then returned to Gibraltar where she escorted convoys to Freetown in Sierra Leone, returning to the UK in October that year for maintenance and repair on the Clyde. On 8 November 1942, British and American forces invaded French North Africa in Operation Torch, with Partridge part of Force H, which was positioned to protect the landings at Oran and Algiers against any interference by the Italian or Vichy French fleets. On 18 December 1942, Partridge was torpedoed and sunk by the German submarine U-565 when on anti-submarine patrol 50 miles west of Oran (35°50′N 1°35′W). 173 survivors were rescued by sister ship Penn, with 37 killed.
