= SM U-23 (Austria-Hungary) =

Austro-Hungarian Navy's U-20-class submarine

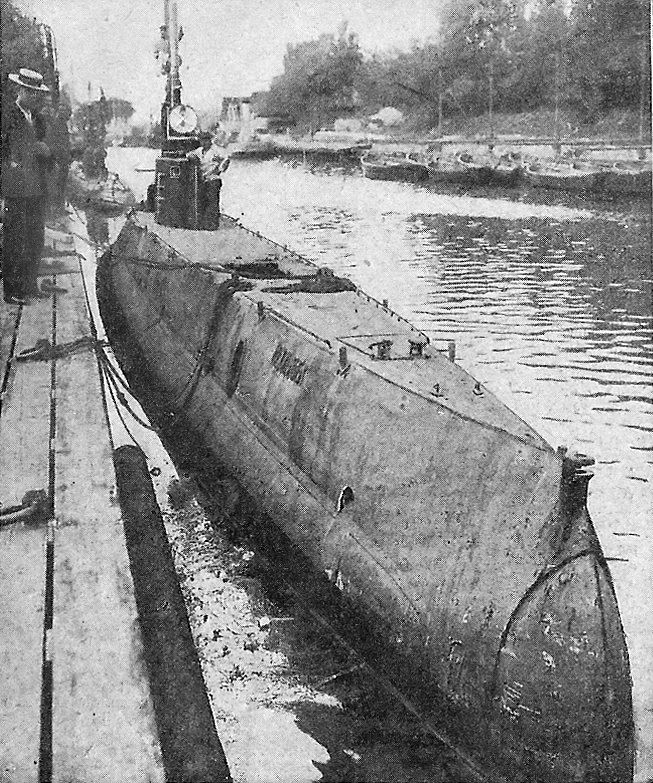
- The design for U-23 was based on that of the Havmanden class of the Royal Danish Navy (Havmanden pictured)

History

Austria-Hungary
- Name: SM U-23
- Ordered: 27 March 1915
- Builder: Hungarian UBAG yard, Fiume
- Launched: 5 January 1917
- Commissioned: 1917
- Fate: Sunk, 21 February 1918

Service record
- Commanders: Klemens Ritter von Bézard; 15 April 1917 - 21 February 1918
- Victories: None

General characteristics
- Type: U-20-class submarine
- Displacement: 173 t, surfaced; 210 t, submerged
- Length: 127 ft 2 in (38.76 m)
- Beam: 13 ft (4.0 m)
- Draft: 9 ft (2.7 m)
- Propulsion: 1 × shaft; 1 × diesel engine, 450 bhp (340 kW); 1 × electric motor, 160 shp (120 kW)
- Speed: 12 knots (22 km/h) surfaced; 9 knots (17 km/h) submerged
- Range: 1,400 nautical miles (2,600 km) at 10 knots (19 km/h) surfaced; 23 nautical miles (43 km) at 8 knots (15 km/h) submerged
- Complement: 18
- Armament: 2 × 45 cm (17.7 in) torpedo tubes (both in front); 2 torpedoes; 1 × 66 mm (2.6 in)/26 deck gun; 1 × 8 mm (0.31 in) machine gun

SM U-23 or U-XXIII was a U-20-class submarine or U-boat built for and operated by the Austro-Hungarian Navy (German: Kaiserliche und Königliche Kriegsmarine or K.u.K. Kriegsmarine) during the First World War. The design for U-23 was based on that of the submarines of the Royal Danish Navy's Havmanden class (which had been designed by Whitehead & Co. in Fiume), and was largely obsolete by the beginning of the war.

U-23 was just over 127 feet (39 m) long and was armed with two bow torpedo tubes, a deck gun, and a machine gun. In February 1918, U-23 was sunk with all hands by the Italian torpedo boat Airone while attempting an attack on the Italian transport Memfi. U-23 had no wartime successes.

== Design and construction ==
When it became apparent to the Austro-Hungarian Navy that the First World War would not be a short one, they moved to bolster their U-boat fleet by seizing the plans for the Danish Havmanden class submarines, which had been designed by Whitehead & Co. in Fiume, who had built three units. Although the Austro-Hungarian Navy was not happy with the design, which was largely obsolete, it was the only design for which plans were available and which could be begun immediately in domestic shipyards. The Austro-Hungarian Navy unenthusiastically placed orders for U-23 and her three sister boats on 27 March 1915.

U-23 was one of two boats of the class to be built at the Hungarian UBAG yard in Fiume. Due to demands by the Hungarian government, subcontracts for the class were divided between Hungarian and Austrian firms, and this politically expedient solution worsened technical problems with the design, resulting in numerous modifications and delays for the class in general.

U-23 was an ocean-going submarine that displaced 173 tonnes (191 short tons) surfaced and 210 tonnes (231 short tons) submerged and was designed for a complement of 18. She was 127 feet 2 inches (38.76 m) long with a beam of 13 feet (4.0 m) and a draft of 9 feet (2.7 m). For propulsion, she featured a single shaft, a single 450 bhp (340 kW) diesel engine for surface running, and a single 160 shp (120 kW) electric motor for submerged travel. She was capable of 12 knots (22 km/h) while surfaced and 9 knots (17 km/h) while submerged. Although there is no specific notation of a range for U-23, the Havmanden class, upon which the U-20 class was based, had a range of 1,400 nautical miles (2,600 km) at 10 knots (19 km/h), surfaced, and 23 nautical miles (43 km) at 8 knots (15 km/h) submerged.

U-23 was armed with two 45 cm (17.7 in) torpedo tubes located in the front and carried a complement of two torpedoes. She was also equipped with a 66 mm (2.6 in)/26 deck gun and an 8 mm (0.31 in) machine gun.

== Service career ==
U-23 was launched on 5 January 1917, but It is not known with certainty when U-23 was commissioned. Author Paul Halpern reports that U-23 and her three sisters all entered service between August and November 1917. Although there are no specific reports of problems with U-23, the U-20 class as a whole suffered from unreliable engines which compounded the poor handling characteristics of the boats. On 21 February 1918, Linienschiffsleutnant Klemens Ritter von Bezard, U-23's only commanding officer, was guiding the boat in an attack on the Italian transport Memfi in the Straits of Otranto. U-23 came under attack by the Italian torpedo boat Airone which first tried to ram the U-boat, and then deployed an explosive paravane. When the paravane contacted the submerged U-23, it exploded, blowing debris into the air and sinking the submarine with all hands. Like all of her sister boats, U-23 had no wartime successes.

== Bibliography ==
- Gardiner, Robert; Gray, Randal, eds. (1985). Conway's All the World's Fighting Ships 1906–1921. Annapolis, Maryland: Naval Institute Press. ISBN 978-0-87021-907-8. OCLC 12119866.
- Gibson, R. H.; Prendergast, Maurice (2003) [1931]. The German Submarine War, 1914–1918. Annapolis, Maryland: Naval Institute Press. ISBN 978-1-59114-314-7. OCLC 52924732.
- Grant, Robert M. (2002) [1964]. U-boats Destroyed: The Effect of Anti-submarine Warfare, 1914–1918. Penzance: Periscope. ISBN 978-1-904381-00-6. OCLC 50215640.
- Halpern, Paul G. (1994). A Naval History of World War I. Annapolis, Maryland: Naval Institute Press. ISBN 978-0-87021-266-6. OCLC 28411665.
