= German submarine U-565 =

German World War II submarine

History

Nazi Germany
- Name: U-565
- Ordered: 24 October 1939
- Builder: Blohm & Voss, Hamburg
- Yard number: 541
- Laid down: 30 March 1940
- Launched: 20 February 1941
- Commissioned: 10 April 1941
- Fate: Scuttled on 30 September 1944 after being damaged on 19 and 24 September 1944

General characteristics
- Class & type: Type VIIC submarine
- Displacement: 769 tonnes (757 long tons) surfaced; 871 t (857 long tons) submerged
- Length: 67.10 m (220 ft 2 in) o/a; 50.50 m (165 ft 8 in) pressure hull
- Beam: 6.20 m (20 ft 4 in) o/a; 4.70 m (15 ft 5 in) pressure hull
- Height: 9.60 m (31 ft 6 in)
- Draught: 4.74 m (15 ft 7 in)
- Installed power: 2,800–3,200 PS (2,100–2,400 kW; 2,800–3,200 bhp) (diesels); 750 PS (550 kW; 740 shp) (electric)
- Propulsion: 2 shafts; 2 × diesel engines; 2 × electric motors
- Speed: 17.7 knots (32.8 km/h; 20.4 mph) surfaced; 7.6 knots (14.1 km/h; 8.7 mph) submerged
- Range: 8,500 nmi (15,700 km; 9,800 mi) at 10 knots (19 km/h; 12 mph) surfaced; 80 nmi (150 km; 92 mi) at 4 knots (7.4 km/h; 4.6 mph) submerged
- Test depth: 230 m (750 ft); Crush depth: 250–295 m (820–968 ft)
- Complement: 4 officers, 40–56 enlisted
- Armament: 5 × 53.3 cm (21 in) torpedo tubes (four bow, one stern); 14 × torpedoes or 26 TMA mines; 1 × 8.8 cm (3.46 in) deck gun (220 rounds); 1 x 2 cm (0.79 in) C/30 AA gun

Service record
- Part of: 1st U-boat Flotilla; 10 April – 31 December 1941; 29th U-boat Flotilla; 1 January 1942 – 24 September 1944
- Identification codes: M 41 992
- Commanders: Oblt.z.S. Johann Jebsen; 10 April 1941 – 17 March 1942; Kptlt. Wilhelm Franken; 17 March 1942 – 7 October 1943; Kptlt. Fritz Henning; 8 October 1943 – 24 September 1944
- Operations: 20 patrols: 1st patrol: 8 July - 6 August 1941; 2nd patrol: 1 September – 7 October 1941; 3rd patrol: 3 November – 25 December 1941; 4th patrol: 21 January – 17 March 1942; 5th patrol: 11 – 30 April 1942; 6th patrol: 7 May – 10 June 1942; 7th patrol: 9 July – 4 August 1942; 8th patrol: a. 16 – 25 August 1942; b. 31 August – 4 September 1942; 9th patrol: 25 October – 13 November 1942; 10th patrol: 23 November 1942 – 1 January 1943; 11th patrol: 14 February – 5 March 1943; 12th patrol: 8 April – 12 May 1943; 13th patrol: 17 June – 23 July 1943; 14th patrol: 7 September – 1 October 1943; 15th patrol: 23 October – 4 November 1943; 16th patrol: 6 – 23 November 1943; 17th patrol: 12 – 27 December 1943; 18th patrol: 15 February – 7 March 1944; 19th patrol: 1 April – 2 May 1944; 20th patrol: 26 August – 13 September 1944
- Victories: 3 merchant ships sunk (11,347 GRT); 2 warships sunk (6,990 tons); 2 merchant ships damaged (17,565 GRT)

German submarine U-565 was a Type VIIC U-boat built for Nazi Germany's Kriegsmarine for service during World War II. She was laid down on 30 March 1940 by Blohm & Voss in Hamburg as yard number 541, launched on 20 February 1941 and commissioned on 10 April 1941 under Oberleutnant Johann Jebsen.

== Design ==
German Type VIIC submarines were preceded by the shorter Type VIIB submarines. U-565 had a displacement of 769 tonnes (757 long tons) when at the surface and 871 tonnes (857 long tons) while submerged. She had a total length of 67.10 m (220 ft 2 in), a pressure hull length of 50.50 m (165 ft 8 in), a beam of 6.20 m (20 ft 4 in), a height of 9.60 m (31 ft 6 in), and a draught of 4.74 m (15 ft 7 in). The submarine was powered by two Germaniawerft F46 four-stroke, six-cylinder supercharged diesel engines producing a total of 2,800 to 3,200 metric horsepower (2,060 to 2,350 kW; 2,760 to 3,160 shp) for use while surfaced, two BBC GG UB 720/8 double-acting electric motors producing a total of 750 metric horsepower (550 kW; 740 shp) for use while submerged. She had two shafts and two 1.23 m (4 ft) propellers. The boat was capable of operating at depths of up to 230 metres (750 ft).

The submarine had a maximum surface speed of 17.7 knots (32.8 km/h; 20.4 mph) and a maximum submerged speed of 7.6 knots (14.1 km/h; 8.7 mph). When submerged, the boat could operate for 80 nautical miles (150 km; 92 mi) at 4 knots (7.4 km/h; 4.6 mph); when surfaced, she could travel 8,500 nautical miles (15,700 km; 9,800 mi) at 10 knots (19 km/h; 12 mph). U-565 was fitted with five 53.3 cm (21 in) torpedo tubes (four fitted at the bow and one at the stern), fourteen torpedoes, one 8.8 cm (3.46 in) SK C/35 naval gun, 220 rounds, and a 2 cm (0.79 in) C/30 anti-aircraft gun. The boat had a complement of between forty-four and sixty.

== Service history ==
The boat's service began on 10 April 1941 with training as part of the 1st U-boat Flotilla. She was transferred to the 29th flotilla on 1 January 1942 in the Mediterranean where she remained until being scuttled in 1944. In 20 patrols she sank three merchant ships, for a total of 11,347 gross register tons (GRT), plus two warships sunk and another two merchant ships damaged.

=== Wolfpacks ===
She took part in two wolfpacks, namely:

- Arnauld (5 – 18 November 1941)
- Wal (10 – 12 November 1942)

=== Fate ===
U-565 was badly damaged by bombs dropped by US aircraft on 19 and 24 September 1944 in the Mediterranean near Skaramanga in Greece. She was scuttled on 30 September 1944 at Skaramanga Bay.

== Summary of raiding history ==
Date	Ship Name	Nationality	Tonnage (Note: Merchant ship tonnages are in gross register tons. Military vessels are listed by tons displacement.)	Fate
11 March 1942	HMS Naiad	Royal Navy	5,450	Sunk
23 April 1942	Kirkland	United Kingdom	1,361	Sunk
18 December 1942	HMS Partridge	Royal Navy	1,540	Sunk
24 February 1943	Nathanael Greene	United States	7,176	Damaged
27 February 1943	Seminole	United Kingdom	10,389	Damaged
20 April 1943	Michigan	United States	5,594	Sunk
20 April 1943	Sidi-Bel-Abbès	Free France	4,392	Sunk

== See also ==
- Mediterranean U-boat Campaign (World War II)

== Bibliography ==
- Busch, Rainer; Röll, Hans-Joachim (1999). German U-boat commanders of World War II: a biographical dictionary. Translated by Brooks, Geoffrey. London, Annapolis, Md: Greenhill Books, Naval Institute Press. ISBN 1-55750-186-6.
- Busch, Rainer; Röll, Hans-Joachim (1999). Der U-Boot-Krieg, 1939-1945: Deutsche U-Boot-Verluste von September 1939 bis Mai 1945 [German U-boat losses from September 1939 to May 1945] (in German). Vol. IV. Hamburg, Berlin, Bonn: Mittler. ISBN 3-8132-0514-2.
- Gröner, Eric; Jung, Dieter; Maass, Martin (1991). German Warships 1815-1945: U-boats and Mine Warfare Vessels. Vol. 2. Translated by Thomas, Keith; Magowan, Rachel. London: Conway Maritime Press. ISBN 0-85177-593-4.
- Sharpe, Peter (1998). U-Boat Fact File. Great Britain: Midland Publishing. ISBN 1-85780-072-9.
