= British Rail Class 43 (Warship Class) =

Class of 33 B′B′ 2200hp diesel-hydraulic locomotives

D800 Warship British Rail Class 43 Warship
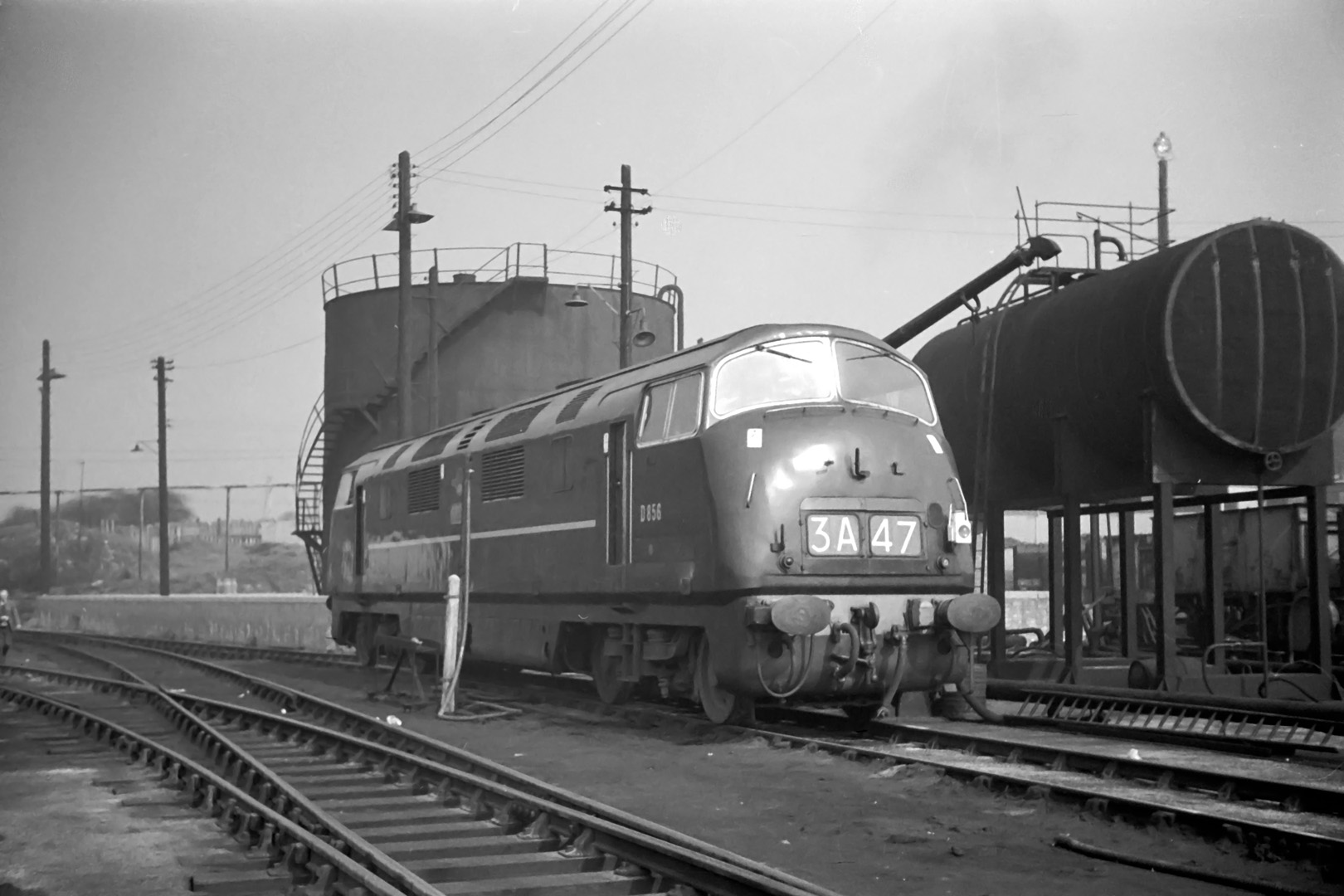
- D856 Trojan at Old Oak Common c.1961
Type and origin
- Power type: Diesel-hydraulic
- Builder: North British Locomotive Co.
- Serial number: 27962–27994
- Build date: 1960–1962
- Total produced: 33
Specifications
- Configuration
  - UIC: B′B′
  - Commonwealth: B-B
- Gauge: 4 ft 8 1/2 in (1,435 mm) standard gauge
- Wheel diameter: 3 ft 3 1/2 in (1.003 m) new
- Minimum curve: 4.5 chains (91 m)
- Wheelbase
  - Engine: 48 ft 3 in (14.71 m)
  - Bogie: 10 ft 6 in (3.2 m)
- Pivot centres: 37 ft 9 in (11.51 m)
- Length: 60 ft 0 in (18.29 m)
- Width: 8 ft 10 in (2.69 m)
- Height: 12 ft 9 1/2 in (3.899 m)
- Loco weight: 79.5 long tons (80.8 t; 89.0 short tons)
- Fuel capacity: 800 imp gal (3,600 L; 960 US gal)
- Prime mover: MAN L12V 18/21, 2 per locomotive
- Engine type: V12 four stroke diesel
- Cylinders: 12
- Cylinder size: 180 mm × 210 mm (7.087 in × 8.268 in) (bore x stroke)
- Transmission: Hydraulic, Voith/NBL LT.306r
- MU working: ◆ White Diamond
- Train heating: Steam, 940 imp gal (4,300 L; 1,130 US gal) capacity
- Loco brake: Air
- Train brakes: Vacuum
Performance figures
- Maximum speed: 80 mph (130 km/h)
- Power output: Engines: 1,100 bhp (820 kW) × 2
- Tractive effort: Maximum: 49,030 lbf (218 kN)
Career
- Operators: British Rail
- Numbers: D833–D865
- Nicknames: "Warship"
- Axle load class: Route availability 7 (RA 6 from 1969)
- Retired: 1969–1971
- Disposition: All scrapped
- Technical details : B.R.33003/91 except where noted

The British Rail Class 43 Warship, originally classified the D800 Warship, were diesel-hydraulic locomotives built by the North British Locomotive Company (NBL) from 1960 to 1962. They were essentially a subclass of the British Rail Class 42 with a different prime mover. They were numbered D833–D865.

== Classification ==
The D800 series diesel-hydraulic 'Warship Class', of B-B wheel arrangement, was constructed by two different builders. Those locomotives built by British Railways at Swindon Works were originally numbered D800-D832 and D866-D870. They were allocated Class 42 under the 1968 classification system, while those built by the North British Locomotive Company (NBL) were originally numbered D833-D865 and allocated Class 43. Because of their early withdrawal dates, neither the Swindon- nor the NBL-built locomotives carried TOPS numbers. More detail on factors common to both types can be found in the article on the Swindon-built British Rail Class 42.

== Mechanical details ==
The NBL-built D800s differed mechanically from the Swindon-built batch: the Swindon locomotives used Maybach engines connected to Mekydro hydraulic transmissions whereas the NBL-built examples used MAN engines and Voith transmissions. NBL had entered into an arrangement with the German company MAN AG in the early 1950s to market MAN's engine designs in the UK: NBL was anxious to enter the diesel locomotive market, especially once it became apparent that British Railways would be seeking large quantities of such locomotives when the "Modernisation Plan" was announced. MAN were equally keen to obtain a slice of the UK market for themselves. The first results of this collaboration were the D600-D604 locomotives which failed to take advantage of the weight-saving potential of light alloy stressed-skin construction allied to hydraulic transmissions.

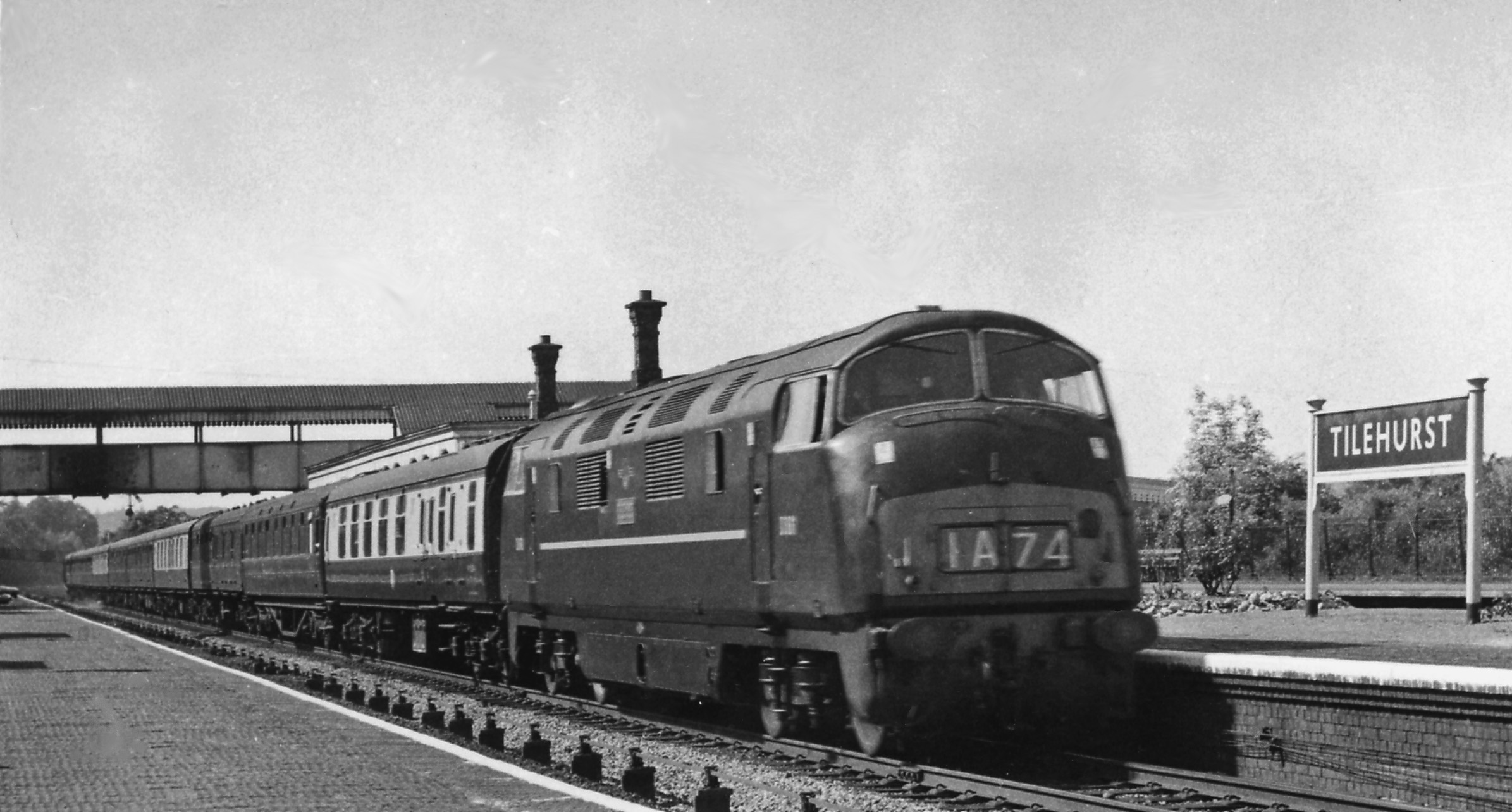
D861 'Vigilant' at Tilehurst in 1962

No further examples of this design were ordered but NBL then received an order for 33 locomotives to a more advanced design, the D800 design drawn up by Swindon Works in turn derived from the original German Krauss-Maffei V200 design. The prime mechanical components of these were two MAN L12V18/21B diesel engines, each rated at 1,100 hp (820 kW) at 1530 rpm and coupled to a Voith LT306r hydraulic transmission; each engine/transmission combination drove one bogie. Unlike the Mekydro four-speed transmissions in the Swindon-built locomotives, the Voith was only a three-speed design but was chosen because it kept compatibility with D600-4 and because NBL already had a licence to manufacture it. Whereas the Swindon-built locomotives had all their engines and transmissions supplied by the German manufacturers (albeit with ten engines and three transmissions supplied as kits of parts for the British licensee to re-assemble) the engines and transmissions required for D833-65 were all built by NBL.

== Operation ==
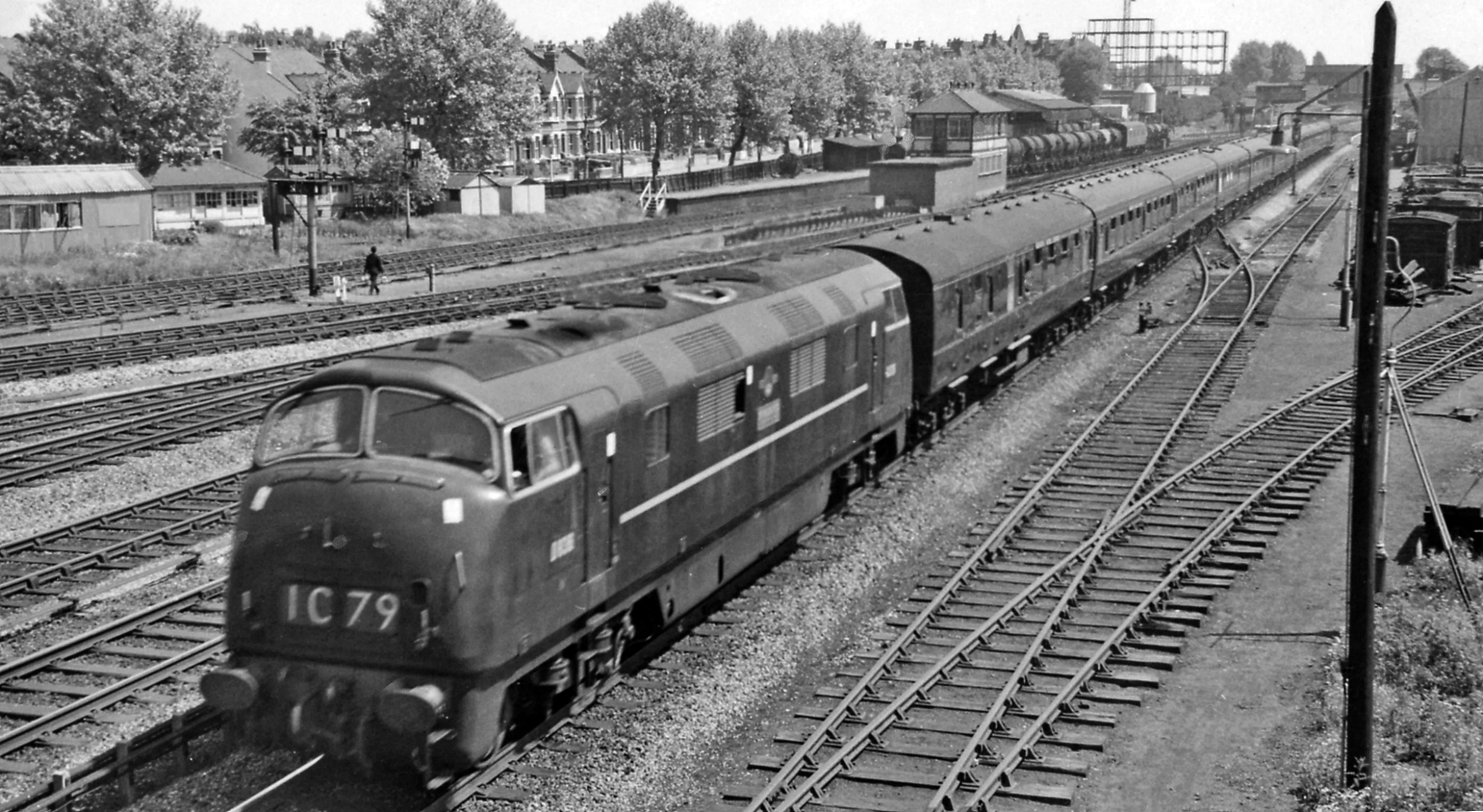
D836 'Powerful' hauling a Paddington-Bristol express in 1962

Distribution of locomotives, July 1967
British Rail Class 43 (Warship Class) is located in Southern England
Code	Name	Quantity
81A	Old Oak Common	1
83A	Newton Abbot	32
Total:		33

In operational service, the NBL locomotives were less reliable than their Swindon-built cousins. Mild steel was used for the exhaust manifolds and these components were prone to fracture. Not only did this result in a loss of exhaust pressure to drive the turbochargers but also the driving cabs rapidly filled with exhaust fumes. The MAN-built engines used in the German DB class V 200 design had nickel-resist steel manifolds and were far less troublesome. The engine design also suffered from being quite highly rated for a design with no active piston cooling and piston ring life expectancy was decreased as a result. One MAN L12V18/21B was sent to the British Internal Combustion Engine Research Association for various tests and potential modifications to improve the deficiencies but nothing ever came of this.

Further problems arose due to converting metric to imperial feet and inches when the MAN drawings were received by NBL. It is likely that rounding errors in these conversions resulted in poor tolerances and lowered reliability in practice. Despite all this, figures for 1965 show the North British Warships covered a far greater annual mileage than contemporary Type 4's such as the Westerns, Peaks and Brush Type 4.

Even in their last year in service, Class 43 locomotives were still hauling long-distance passenger trains over the summer of 1971 on services between Paddington and locations in Devon.

== Accidents and incidents ==
- On 25 August 1962, locomotive No. D833 Panther was hauling a passenger train that came to a halt at Torquay, Devon due to defects on the locomotive. Another passenger train, hauled by GWR 4900 Class 4-6-0 No. 4932 Hatherton Hall, overran signals and was in a rear-end collision. Twenty-three people were injured.
- On 11 January 1967, locomotive No. D864 Zambesi at St Annes Bristol was running light, (by itself), on the up line when it came into contact with the destroyed rear coach of an accident on the down line where the diverted 12:00 Paddington to Swansea had just collided with the rear of the 11:45 Paddington to Bristol. Only very minor damage was sustained by No. D864, which came into glancing contact with the splayed out body panels of the last coach of the Bristol train.
- On 27 September 1967, locomotive No. D853 Thruster was hauling the 09:45 Paddington to Weston super Mare, which travelled too fast on the relief line through Foxhall Junction, Didcot, and derailed causing one death and 23 injuries. The derailment was caused by the train being driven at excessive speed through the crossover.

== Withdrawal ==
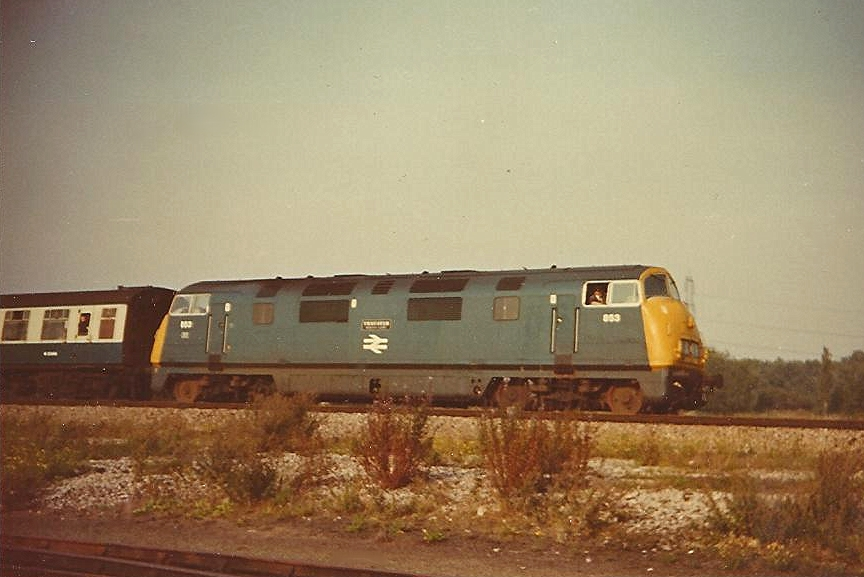
D853 "Thruster" in 1970.

The NBL-built D800s were withdrawn before their Class 42 sisters, themselves doomed to a short life because of the decision to standardise on diesel-electric transmission for mainline locomotives. None have survived into preservation. Many of the names were later allocated to Class 50 locomotives, which were also named after British warships. They were allocated to Bristol Bath Road, Laira Plymouth, Newton Abbot and Old Oak Common.

Year	Quantity in service at start of year	Quantity withdrawn	Locomotive numbers	Notes
1969	33	3	840/48/63	
1970	30	0	–	
1971	30	30	833–39/41–47/49–62/64–65	857 switched off in full working order.

== Class details ==
Built by NBL, date of order 3 July 1958, maker's order no. L100, Swindon lot no. 443

Running number	Name	Date to traffic	Date withdrawn	Notes
D833	Panther	6 July 1960	3 October 1971	Scrapped 5 February 1972 at Swindon
D834	Pathfinder	26 July 1960	3 October 1971	Scrapped 18 February 1972 at Swindon
D835	Pegasus	5 August 1960	3 October 1971	Scrapped 11 December 1971 at Swindon
D836	Powerful	13 September 1960	22 May 1971	Scrapped 10 March 1972 at Swindon
D837	Ramillies	8 November 1960	22 May 1971	Scrapped 23 June 1972 at Swindon
D838	Rapid	3 October 1960	27 March 1971	Scrapped 29 July 1972 at Swindon
D839	Relentless	12 November 1960	3 October 1971	Scrapped 4 August 1972 at Swindon
D840	Resistance	3 February 1961	26 April 1969	Scrapped 26 May 1971 at Swindon
D841	Roebuck	14 December 1960	3 October 1971	Scrapped 25 February 1972 at Swindon
D842	Royal Oak	20 December 1960	3 October 1971	Scrapped 17 March 1972 at Swindon. Replica nameplate on a pub near York
D843	Sharpshooter	2 January 1961	22 May 1971	Scrapped 21 April 1972 at Swindon
D844	Spartan	16 March 1961	3 October 1971	Scrapped 26 May 1972 at Swindon
D845	Sprightly	7 April 1961	3 October 1971	Scrapped 19 May 1972 at Swindon
D846	Steadfast	12 April 1961	22 May 1971	Scrapped 24 December 1971 at Swindon
D847	Strongbow	22 April 1961	27 March 1971	Scrapped 17 March 1972 at Swindon
D848	Sultan	27 April 1961	26 March 1969	Scrapped 26 May 1971 at Swindon
D849	Superb	29 May 1961	22 May 1971	Scrapped 7 July 1972 at Swindon
D850	Swift	8 June 1961	22 May 1971	Scrapped 3 March 1972 at Swindon
D851	Temeraire	10 July 1961	22 May 1971	Scrapped 9 June 1972 at Swindon
D852	Tenacious	24 July 1961	3 October 1971	Scrapped 2 June 1972 at Swindon
D853	Thruster	30 August 1961	3 October 1971	Scrapped 16 June 1972 at Swindon
D854	Tiger	26 September 1961	3 October 1971	Scrapped 5 May 1972 at Swindon
D855	Triumph	25 October 1961	3 October 1971	Scrapped 28 April 1972 at Swindon
D856	Trojan	16 November 1961	22 May 1971	Scrapped 7 January 1972 at Swindon
D857	Undaunted	11 December 1961	3 October 1971	Scrapped 28 April 1972 at Swindon
D858	Valorous	15 December 1961	3 October 1971	Scrapped 9 June 1972 at Swindon
D859	Vanquisher	9 January 1962	27 March 1971	Scrapped 30 June 1972 at Swindon
D860	Victorious	22 January 1962	27 March 1971	Scrapped 4 December 1971 at Swindon
D861	Vigilant	14 February 1962	3 October 1971	Scrapped 29 July 1972 at Swindon
D862	Viking	13 March 1962	3 October 1971	Scrapped 12 May 1972 at Swindon
D863	Warrior	7 April 1962	26 March 1969	Scrapped July 1969 at J Cashmore Ltd, Newport
D864	Zambesi	10 May 1962	27 March 1971	Was to have been named Zealous; Scrapped 19 November 1971 at Swindon
D865	Zealous	28 June 1962	22 May 1971	Was to have been named Zenith; Scrapped 9 June 1972 at Swindon
