= Undaunted =

Undaunted or The Undaunted may refer to:

- The Undaunted (TV series), docudrama about Canada's founders, aired on CBC in 1983
- The Undaunted (1936 novel) by physician Alan L. Hart
- The Undaunted (2009 novel) by Gerald Lund, historical fiction of Mormon pioneers

== See also ==
- Undaunted - The Early Life of Josh McDowell (2011), a documentary
- HMS Undaunted (British ships of that name)
- USS Undaunted (American ships)
