= German submarine U-427 =

German World War II submarine

- U-995, a Type VIIC U-boat at the German naval memorial at Laboe which was almost identical to U-427

History

Nazi Germany
- Name: U-427
- Ordered: 5 June 1941
- Builder: Danziger Werft, Danzig
- Yard number: 128
- Laid down: 27 July 1942
- Launched: 6 February 1943
- Commissioned: 2 June 1943
- Fate: Surrendered on 9 May 1945; Scuttled on 21 December 1945

General characteristics
- Class & type: Type VIIC submarine
- Displacement: 769 tonnes (757 long tons) surfaced; 871 t (857 long tons) submerged
- Length: 67.10 m (220 ft 2 in) o/a; 50.50 m (165 ft 8 in) pressure hull
- Beam: 6.20 m (20 ft 4 in) o/a; 4.70 m (15 ft 5 in) pressure hull
- Height: 9.60 m (31 ft 6 in)
- Draught: 4.74 m (15 ft 7 in)
- Installed power: 2,800–3,200 PS (2,100–2,400 kW; 2,800–3,200 bhp) (diesels); 750 PS (550 kW; 740 shp) (electric)
- Propulsion: 2 shafts; 2 × diesel engines; 2 × electric motors
- Speed: 17.7 knots (32.8 km/h; 20.4 mph) surfaced; 7.6 knots (14.1 km/h; 8.7 mph) submerged
- Range: 8,500 nmi (15,700 km; 9,800 mi) at 10 knots (19 km/h; 12 mph) surfaced; 80 nmi (150 km; 92 mi) at 4 knots (7.4 km/h; 4.6 mph) submerged
- Test depth: 230 m (750 ft); Calculated crush depth: 250–295 m (820–968 ft)
- Complement: 44-52 officers and ratings
- Armament: 5 × torpedo tubes (four bow, one stern); 14 × 53.3 cm (21 in) torpedoes; 1 × 8.8 cm (3.46 in) SK C/35 naval gun; various anti-aircraft guns

Service record
- Part of: 8th U-boat Flotilla; 2 June 1943 – 1 June 1944; 7th U-boat Flotilla; 1 June – 31 July 1944; 11th U-boat Flotilla; 1 August – 4 November 1944; 13th U-boat Flotilla; 5 November 1944 – 28 February 1945; 14th U-boat Flotilla; 1 March – 8 May 1945
- Identification codes: M 52 216
- Commanders: Oblt.z.S. Carl-Gabriel Graf von Gudenus; 2 June 1943 – 9 May 1945
- Operations: 5 patrols: 1st patrol: 25 September – 1 October 1944; 2nd patrol: a. 30 October – 8 November 1944; b. 11 – 14 November 1944; 3rd patrol: a. 4 December 1944 – 23 February 1945; b. 23 – 24 February 1945; 4th patrol: 9 – 20 April 1945; 5th patrol: a. 21 April – 2 May 1945; b. 5 May 1945; c. 15 – 19 May 1945
- Victories: None

German submarine U-427 was a Type VIIC U-boat of Nazi Germany's Kriegsmarine during World War II.

== Design ==
German Type VIIC submarines were preceded by the shorter Type VIIB submarines. U-427 had a displacement of 769 tonnes (757 long tons) when at the surface and 871 tonnes (857 long tons) while submerged. She had a total length of 67.10 m (220 ft 2 in), a pressure hull length of 50.50 m (165 ft 8 in), a beam of 6.20 m (20 ft 4 in), a height of 9.60 m (31 ft 6 in), and a draught of 4.74 m (15 ft 7 in). The submarine was powered by two Germaniawerft F46 four-stroke, six-cylinder supercharged diesel engines producing a total of 2,800 to 3,200 metric horsepower (2,060 to 2,350 kW; 2,760 to 3,160 shp) for use while surfaced, two Siemens-Schuckert GU 343/38–8 double-acting electric motors producing a total of 750 metric horsepower (550 kW; 740 shp) for use while submerged. She had two shafts and two 1.23 m (4 ft) propellers. The boat was capable of operating at depths of up to 230 metres (750 ft).

The submarine had a maximum surface speed of 17.7 knots (32.8 km/h; 20.4 mph) and a maximum submerged speed of 7.6 knots (14.1 km/h; 8.7 mph). When submerged, the boat could operate for 80 nautical miles (150 km; 92 mi) at 4 knots (7.4 km/h; 4.6 mph); when surfaced, she could travel 8,500 nautical miles (15,700 km; 9,800 mi) at 10 knots (19 km/h; 12 mph). U-427 was fitted with five 53.3 cm (21 in) torpedo tubes (four fitted at the bow and one at the stern), fourteen torpedoes, one 8.8 cm (3.46 in) SK C/35 naval gun, 220 rounds, and two twin 2 cm (0.79 in) C/30 anti-aircraft guns. The boat had a complement of between forty-four and sixty.

== Service history ==
Built by Danziger Werft, Danzig, the U-boat was laid down on 27 July 1942, launched on 6 February 1943 and commissioned on 2 June 1943 with a crew of 53 under their Austrian commander Oberleutnant Carl-Gabriel Graf von Gudenus. It survived until the end of the war.

Most U-boats achieved notoriety for the number of kills they achieved, or the total tonnage of the vessels they sank, but in the case of U-427, its fame was achieved differently.

From its first voyage, on 20 June 1944, until the end of the war, U-427 never destroyed any of its targets. It fired torpedoes at two vessels, HMCS Haida and HMCS Iroquois on 29 April 1945, missing both.

Instead, it became known for its ability to survive under harrowing circumstances. During April of 1945, around the time of its attacks on the two British ships, U-427 survived 678 depth charge attempts.

On 2 May 1945, U-427 returned to its base at Kilbotn, Norway, where it remained for the few remaining days before Germany's surrender.

U-427 surrendered at Narvik, Norway, on 9 May 1945, and was transferred to Loch Eriboll, Scotland, on 19 May, and later to Loch Ryan as part of "Operation Deadlight" when it was sunk on 21 December 1945 at 56°04′N 09°35′W.

== Bibliography ==
- Busch, Rainer; Röll, Hans-Joachim (1999). German U-boat commanders of World War II : a biographical dictionary. Translated by Brooks, Geoffrey. London, Annapolis, Md: Greenhill Books, Naval Institute Press. ISBN 1-55750-186-6.
- Busch, Rainer; Röll, Hans-Joachim (1999). Deutsche U-Boot-Verluste von September 1939 bis Mai 1945 [German U-boat losses from September 1939 to May 1945]. Der U-Boot-Krieg (in German). Vol. IV. Hamburg, Berlin, Bonn: Mittler. ISBN 3-8132-0514-2.
- Gröner, Erich; Jung, Dieter; Maass, Martin (1991). U-boats and Mine Warfare Vessels. German Warships 1815–1945. Vol. 2. Translated by Thomas, Keith; Magowan, Rachel. London: Conway Maritime Press. ISBN 0-85177-593-4.
