= German submarine U-294 =

German World War II submarine

History

Nazi Germany
- Name: U-294
- Ordered: 14 October 1941
- Builder: Bremer Vulkan Werft, Bremen-Vegesack
- Yard number: 59
- Laid down: 22 December 1942
- Launched: 27 August 1943
- Commissioned: 4 October 1943
- Fate: Surrendered on 9 May 1945; sunk as part of Operation Deadlight on 31 December 1945

General characteristics
- Class & type: Type VIIC/41 submarine
- Displacement: 759 tonnes (747 long tons) surfaced; 860 t (846 long tons) submerged
- Length: 67.10 m (220 ft 2 in) o/a; 50.50 m (165 ft 8 in) pressure hull
- Beam: 6.20 m (20 ft 4 in) o/a; 4.70 m (15 ft 5 in) pressure hull
- Height: 9.60 m (31 ft 6 in)
- Draught: 4.74 m (15 ft 7 in)
- Installed power: 2,800–3,200 PS (2,100–2,400 kW; 2,800–3,200 bhp) (diesels); 750 PS (550 kW; 740 shp) (electric)
- Propulsion: 2 shafts; 2 × diesel engines; 2 × electric motors
- Speed: 17.7 knots (32.8 km/h; 20.4 mph) surfaced; 7.6 knots (14.1 km/h; 8.7 mph) submerged
- Range: 8,500 nmi (15,700 km; 9,800 mi) at 10 knots (19 km/h; 12 mph) surfaced; 80 nmi (150 km; 92 mi) at 4 knots (7.4 km/h; 4.6 mph) submerged
- Test depth: 250 m (820 ft); Crush depth: 275–325 m (902–1,066 ft)
- Complement: 4 officers, 40–56 enlisted
- Armament: 5 × 53.3 cm (21 in) torpedo tubes (four bow, one stern); 14 × torpedoes; 1 × 8.8 cm (3.46 in) deck gun (220 rounds); 1 × 3.7 cm (1.5 in) Flak M42 AA gun; 2 × 2 cm (0.79 in) C/30 AA guns

Service record
- Part of: 8th U-boat Flotilla; 4 October 1943 – 31 July 1944; 11th U-boat Flotilla; 1 August – 5 November 1944; 13th U-boat Flotilla; 6 November – 28 February 1945; 14th U-boat Flotilla; 1 March – 8 May 1945
- Identification codes: M 52 122
- Commanders: Oblt.z.S. Heinz Schütt; 4 October 1943 – 9 May 1945
- Operations: 5 patrols: 1st patrol: a. 31 May – 23 June 1944; b. 12 – 13 July 1944; c. 31 August – 2 September 1944; d. 9 – 13 September 1944; 2nd patrol: 18 – 24 September 1944; 3rd patrol: a. 15 – 23 October 1944; b. 27 – 28 October 1944; c. 4 November 1944; d. 7 – 12 November 1944; 4th patrol: a. 12 – 14 November 1944; b. 15 – 17 November 1944; c. 25 – 27 December 1944; d. 15 – 18 March 1945; e. 20 – 22 March 1945; 5th patrol: a. 8 – 24 April 1945; b. 25 – 26 April 1945; c. 15 – 19 May 1945
- Victories: None

German submarine U-294 was a Type VIIC/41 U-boat of Nazi Germany's Kriegsmarine during World War II.

She was laid down on 22 December 1942 by the Bremer Vulkan Werft (yard) at Bremen-Vegesack as yard number 59, launched on 27 August 1943, and commissioned on 4 October with Oberleutnant zur See Heinz Schütt in command.

In five patrols, she sank or damaged no ships.

She surrendered at Narvik in Norway on 9 May 1945 and was sunk as part of Operation Deadlight on 31 December 1945.

== Design ==
German Type VIIC/41 submarines were preceded by the shorter Type VIIB submarines. U-294 had a displacement of 759 tonnes (747 long tons) when at the surface and 860 tonnes (850 long tons) while submerged. She had a total length of 67.10 m (220 ft 2 in), a pressure hull length of 50.50 m (165 ft 8 in), a beam of 6.20 m (20 ft 4 in), a height of 9.60 m (31 ft 6 in), and a draught of 4.74 m (15 ft 7 in). The submarine was powered by two Germaniawerft F46 four-stroke, six-cylinder supercharged diesel engines producing a total of 2,800 to 3,200 metric horsepower (2,060 to 2,350 kW; 2,760 to 3,160 shp) for use while surfaced, two AEG GU 460/8–27 double-acting electric motors producing a total of 750 metric horsepower (550 kW; 740 shp) for use while submerged. She had two shafts and two 1.23 m (4 ft) propellers. The boat was capable of operating at depths of up to 230 metres (750 ft).

The submarine had a maximum surface speed of 17.7 knots (32.8 km/h; 20.4 mph) and a maximum submerged speed of 7.6 knots (14.1 km/h; 8.7 mph). When submerged, the boat could operate for 80 nautical miles (150 km; 92 mi) at 4 knots (7.4 km/h; 4.6 mph); when surfaced, she could travel 8,500 nautical miles (15,700 km; 9,800 mi) at 10 knots (19 km/h; 12 mph). U-294 was fitted with five 53.3 cm (21 in) torpedo tubes (four fitted at the bow and one at the stern), fourteen torpedoes, one 8.8 cm (3.46 in) SK C/35 naval gun, (220 rounds), one 3.7 cm (1.5 in) Flak M42 and two 2 cm (0.79 in) C/30 anti-aircraft guns. The boat had a complement of between forty-four and sixty.

== Service history ==
The boat's service life began with training with the 8th U-boat Flotilla in October 1943. She was then transferred to the 11th flotilla for operations on 1 August 1944. She was reassigned to the 13th flotilla on 6 November and moved again to the 14th flotilla on 1 March 1945.

=== First and second patrols ===
U-294's first patrol took her to northeast of the Shetland Islands. It was preceded by a short voyage between Kiel in Germany and Stavanger in Norway in May 1944.

More brief sojourns followed, using Bergen, Flekkefjord and Kiel.

The boat's second 'official' patrol was between 18 and 24 September 1944.

=== Third and fourth patrols ===
The submarine's third sortie took her as far as the North Sea.

More short voyages were carried out, using Flekkefjord, Horten Naval Base and Tønsberg in October and November 1944.

Her fourth patrol started and finished in Bergen, but included a stop in Trondheim.

=== Fifth patrol and fate ===
U-294 departed Narvik and arrived at Harstad (northwest of Narvik), before going on to Skjomenfjord, in April 1945.

She arrived at Loch Eriboll in northern Scotland on 19 May 1945 and then moved to Lisahally (Londonderry port), for Operation Deadlight. She was sunk by gunfire from HMS Offa and HMS Zealous on 31 December.

== See also ==
- Battle of the Atlantic (1939–1945)

== Bibliography ==
- Busch, Rainer; Röll, Hans-Joachim (1999). German U-boat commanders of World War II : a biographical dictionary. Translated by Brooks, Geoffrey. London, Annapolis, Md: Greenhill Books, Naval Institute Press. ISBN 1-55750-186-6.
- Busch, Rainer; Röll, Hans-Joachim (1999). Deutsche U-Boot-Verluste von September 1939 bis Mai 1945 [German U-boat losses from September 1939 to May 1945]. Der U-Boot-Krieg (in German). Vol. IV. Hamburg, Berlin, Bonn: Mittler. ISBN 3-8132-0514-2.
- Gröner, Erich; Jung, Dieter; Maass, Martin (1991). U-boats and Mine Warfare Vessels. German Warships 1815–1945. Vol. 2. Translated by Thomas, Keith; Magowan, Rachel. London: Conway Maritime Press. ISBN 0-85177-593-4.
