= British Rail Class 43 =

British Rail Class 43 may refer to:

- British Rail Class 43 (Warship Class), diesel-hydraulic locomotives built from 1960 to 1962
- British Rail Class 43 (HST), the InterCity 125 High Speed Train power cars, built from 1975 to 1982
