= HMS Somme (1918) =

Destroyer that served in the Royal Navy

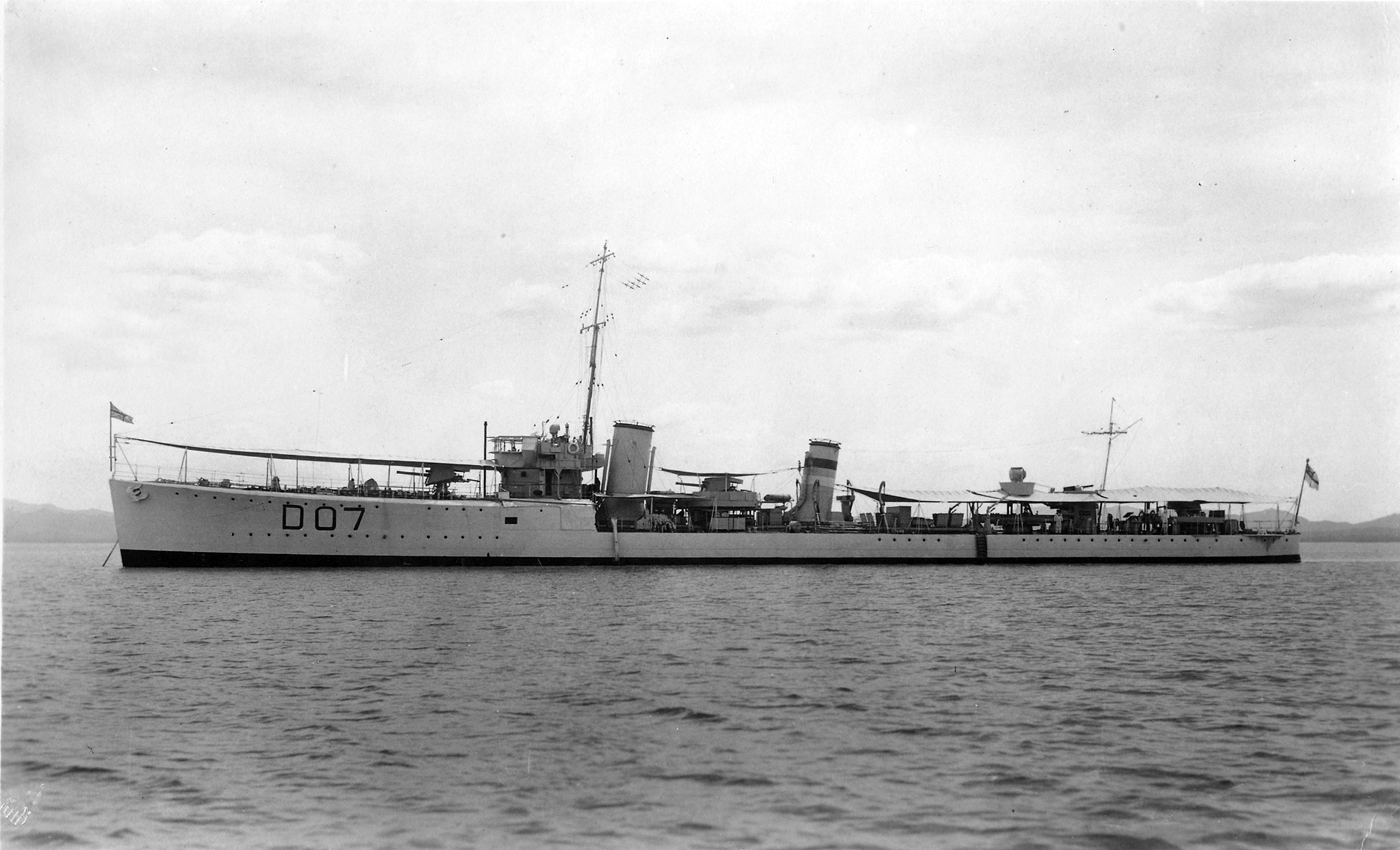
- Somme at anchor near Hong Kong, August, 1928

History

United Kingdom
- Name: Somme
- Ordered: 9 April 1917
- Builder: Fairfield Shipbuilding & Engineering, Govan
- Laid down: November 1917
- Launched: 10 September 1918
- Commissioned: 4 November 1918
- Fate: Sold for scrap, 25 August 1932

General characteristics (as built)
- Class & type: S-class destroyer
- Displacement: 1,000 long tons (1,016 t) (normal)
- Length: 276 ft (84.1 m) o/a
- Beam: 26 ft 8 in (8.1 m)
- Draught: 9 ft 10 in (3 m)
- Installed power: 3 × Yarrow boilers; 27,000 shp (20,000 kW)
- Propulsion: 2 Shafts; 1 steam turbine
- Speed: 34 knots (63 km/h; 39 mph)
- Range: 2,100 nmi (3,900 km; 2,400 mi) at 15 knots (28 km/h; 17 mph)
- Complement: 82
- Armament: 3 × single 4 in (102 mm) guns; 1 × single 2 pdr (40 mm (1.6 in)) AA guns; 2 × twin 21 in (533 mm) torpedo tubes; 2 × single 18 in (450 mm) torpedo tubes

HMS Somme was an Admiralty S-class destroyer built for the Royal Navy during World War I. Commissioned seven days before the end of the war, the ship was sold for scrap in 1932.

== Description ==
The Admiralty S class were larger and faster versions of the preceding R class. The ships had an overall length of 276 feet (84.1 m), a beam of 26 feet 8 inches (8.1 m) and a deep draught of 9 feet 10 inches (3 m). They displaced 1,000 long tons (1,016 t) at normal load. The ship's complement was 82 officers and ratings.

The ships were powered by a single Brown-Curtis geared steam turbine that drove two propeller shafts using steam provided by three Yarrow boilers. The turbines developed a total of 27,000 shaft horsepower (20,000 kW) and gave a maximum speed of 36 knots (67 km/h; 41 mph). Somme reached a speed of 33.7 knots (62.4 km/h; 38.8 mph) during her sea trials. The ships carried enough fuel oil to give them a range of 3,500 nautical miles (6,500 km; 4,000 mi) at 15 knots (28 km/h; 17 mph).

The Admiralty S-class ships were armed with three single QF 4-inch (102 mm) Mark IV guns. One gun was positioned on the forecastle, the second was on a platform between the funnels and the third at the stern. They were equipped with a single QF 2-pounder (40 mm (1.6 in)) "pom-pom" anti-aircraft gun on a platform forward of the mainmast. They were also fitted with two rotating twin mounts for 21-inch (533 mm) torpedoes amidships and two 18-inch (450 mm) torpedo tubes, one on each broadside abaft the forecastle.

== Construction and career ==
Somme, the first ship of her name to serve in the Royal Navy, was ordered on 9 April 1917 as part of the Eleventh War Programme from Fairfield Shipbuilding & Engineering Company. The ship was laid down at the company's Govan shipyard in November 1917, launched on 10 August 1918 and commissioned on 4 November, joining the 14th Destroyer Flotilla of the Grand Fleet. The Royal Navy was reorganised after the end of the First World War, with Somme joining the Seventh Destroyer Flotilla in March 1919. By January 1920, Somme had been transferred to the Mediterranean Fleet, being allocated to a reserve division of the Sixth Destroyer Flotilla.

Somme, along with sister ships Serapis and Steadfast was ordered to join the British forces in the Black Sea on 16 January 1920 and had arrived at Constantinople by the end of the month. She was recommissioned on 15 December 1920. The ship re-commissioned at Portsmouth with 2/5ths crew on 4 December 1923 for service with the Eighth Destroyer Flotilla of the Atlantic Fleet. Somme served on the China Station during 1927–1929 and conducted anti-piracy patrols. The ship was sold for breaking in August 1932.

== Bibliography ==
- Colledge, J. J.; Warlow, Ben (2006) [1969]. Ships of the Royal Navy: The Complete Record of All Fighting Ships of the Royal Navy from the 15th Century to the Present (3rd Rev ed.). London: Chatham Publishing. ISBN 978-1-86176-281-8. OCLC 67375475.
- Friedman, Norman (2009). British Destroyers: From Earliest Days to the Second World War. Barnsley, UK: Seaforth Publishing. ISBN 978-1-84832-049-9.
- Gardiner, Robert & Gray, Randal, eds. (1985). Conway's All The World's Fighting Ships 1906–1921. London: Conway Maritime Press. ISBN 0-85177-245-5.
- Halpern, Paul, ed. (2011). The Mediterranean Fleet, 1919–1929. Publications of the Naval Record Society. Vol. 158. Farnham, UK: Ashgate Publishing Limited. ISBN 978-1-4094-2756-8.
- Manning, T.D. (1961). The British Destroyer. London: Putnam and Co.
- March, Edgar J. (1966). British Destroyers: A History of Development, 1892–1953; Drawn by Admiralty Permission From Official Records & Returns, Ships' Covers & Building Plans. London: Seeley Service. OCLC 164893555.
