= German submarine U-299 =

German World War II submarine

History

Nazi Germany
- Name: U-299
- Ordered: 23 March 1942
- Builder: Bremer Vulkan Werft, Bremen-Vegesack
- Yard number: 64
- Laid down: 1 March 1943
- Launched: 6 November 1943
- Commissioned: 15 December 1943
- Fate: Surrendered on 9 May 1945; sunk as part of Operation Deadlight on 4 December 1945

General characteristics
- Class & type: Type VIIC/41 submarine
- Displacement: 759 tonnes (747 long tons) surfaced; 860 t (846 long tons) submerged
- Length: 67.10 m (220 ft 2 in) o/a; 50.50 m (165 ft 8 in) pressure hull
- Beam: 6.20 m (20 ft 4 in) o/a; 4.70 m (15 ft 5 in) pressure hull
- Height: 9.60 m (31 ft 6 in)
- Draught: 4.74 m (15 ft 7 in)
- Installed power: 2,800–3,200 PS (2,100–2,400 kW; 2,800–3,200 bhp) (diesels); 750 PS (550 kW; 740 shp) (electric)
- Propulsion: 2 shafts; 2 × diesel engines; 2 × electric motors
- Speed: 17.7 knots (32.8 km/h; 20.4 mph) surfaced; 7.6 knots (14.1 km/h; 8.7 mph) submerged
- Range: 8,500 nmi (15,700 km; 9,800 mi) at 10 knots (19 km/h; 12 mph) surfaced; 80 nmi (150 km; 92 mi) at 4 knots (7.4 km/h; 4.6 mph) submerged
- Test depth: 250 m (820 ft); Crush depth: 275–325 m (902–1,066 ft)
- Complement: 4 officers, 40–56 enlisted
- Armament: 5 × 53.3 cm (21 in) torpedo tubes (four bow, one stern); 14 × torpedoes; 1 × 8.8 cm (3.46 in) deck gun (220 rounds); 1 × 3.7 cm (1.5 in) Flak M42 AA gun; 2 × 2 cm (0.79 in) C/30 AA guns

Service record
- Part of: 8th U-boat Flotilla; 15 December 1943 – 31 July 1944; 11th U-boat Flotilla; 1 August – 4 November 1944; 13th U-boat Flotilla; 5 November 1944 – 28 February 1945; 14th U-boat Flotilla; 1 March – 8 May 1945
- Identification codes: M 05 506
- Commanders: Oblt.z.S. Helmuth Heinrich; 15 December 1943 – 9 August 1944; Oblt.z.S. Dietrich Zehle; 9 August – 3 September 1944; Oblt.z.S. Helmuth Heinrich; 3 September – 31 October 1944; Oblt.z.S. Bernhard Emde; 1 November 1944 – 9 May 1945
- Operations: 6 patrols: 1st patrol: a. 5 – 20 July 1944; b. 15 – 17 Aug 1944; c. 30 September – 1 October 1944; 2nd patrol: 11 – 28 October 1944; 3rd patrol: 13 – 16 November 1944; 4th patrol: 21 November – 31 December 1944; 5th patrol: 18 – 21 January 1945; 6th patrol: 24 January – 15 April 1945
- Victories: None

German submarine U-299 was a Type VIIC/41 U-boat of Nazi Germany's Kriegsmarine during World War II.

She was laid down on 1 March 1943 by the Bremer Vulkan Werft (yard) at Bremen-Vegesack as yard number 64, launched on 6 November 1943 and commissioned on 15 December with Oberleutnant zur See Helmuth Heinrich in command.

In six patrols, she sank no ships. She was a member of one wolfpack.

She surrendered at Kristiansand-Sud on 9 May 1945 and was sunk as part of Operation Deadlight on 4 December 1945.

== Design ==
German Type VIIC/41 submarines were preceded by the heavier Type VIIC submarines. U-299 had a displacement of 759 tonnes (747 long tons) when at the surface and 860 tonnes (850 long tons) while submerged. She had a total length of 67.10 m (220 ft 2 in), a pressure hull length of 50.50 m (165 ft 8 in), a beam of 6.20 m (20 ft 4 in), a height of 9.60 m (31 ft 6 in), and a draught of 4.74 m (15 ft 7 in). The submarine was powered by two Germaniawerft F46 four-stroke, six-cylinder supercharged diesel engines producing a total of 2,800 to 3,200 metric horsepower (2,060 to 2,350 kW; 2,760 to 3,160 shp) for use while surfaced, two AEG GU 460/8–27 double-acting electric motors producing a total of 750 metric horsepower (550 kW; 740 shp) for use while submerged. She had two shafts and two 1.23 m (4 ft) propellers. The boat was capable of operating at depths of up to 230 metres (750 ft).

The submarine had a maximum surface speed of 17.7 knots (32.8 km/h; 20.4 mph) and a maximum submerged speed of 7.6 knots (14.1 km/h; 8.7 mph). When submerged, the boat could operate for 80 nautical miles (150 km; 92 mi) at 4 knots (7.4 km/h; 4.6 mph); when surfaced, she could travel 8,500 nautical miles (15,700 km; 9,800 mi) at 10 knots (19 km/h; 12 mph). U-299 was fitted with five 53.3 cm (21 in) torpedo tubes (four fitted at the bow and one at the stern), fourteen torpedoes, one 8.8 cm (3.46 in) SK C/35 naval gun, (220 rounds), one 3.7 cm (1.5 in) Flak M42 and two 2 cm (0.79 in) C/30 anti-aircraft guns. The boat had a complement of between forty-four and sixty.

== Service history ==
The boat's service life began with training with the 8th U-boat Flotilla in December 1943. She was then transferred to the 11th flotilla for operations on 1 August 1944. She was reassigned to the 13th flotilla on 5 November and moved again to the 14th flotilla on 1 March 1945.

=== First and second patrols ===
U-295's first patrol was notable in that she came under air attack on 16 July 1944. The commander was wounded. She had been part of a defence line off the Norwegian coast.

She then embarked on a pair of short journeys between Bergen, Larvik and Kristiansand.

Her second foray, between Kristiansand and Bergen was uneventful.

=== Third and fourth patrols ===
The submarine's third sortie took her into the Barents Sea, off Murmansk.

Her fourth patrol started in Trondheim and finished in Bogenbrucht, (west of Narvik).

=== Fifth patrol ===
She departed Bogenbrucht on 18 January 1945 and arrived at Trondheim on the 21st.

=== Sixth patrol and fate ===
The boat departed Trondheim on 24 January 1945. Her route covered the North and Norwegian Seas. She docked in Kristiansand on 15 April. She was at sea for 84 days, her longest patrol.

She surrendered at Kristiansand-sud on 9 May 1945 and in accordance with the terms, she was transferred to Loch Ryan in western Scotland for Operation Deadlight on the 29th. Having been towed out to the scuttling area by HMS Obedient, she was sunk without ceremony on 4 December.

== See also ==
- Battle of the Atlantic (1939-1945)

== Bibliography ==
- Busch, Rainer; Röll, Hans-Joachim (1999). German U-boat commanders of World War II : a biographical dictionary. Translated by Brooks, Geoffrey. London, Annapolis, Md: Greenhill Books, Naval Institute Press. ISBN 1-55750-186-6.
- Busch, Rainer; Röll, Hans-Joachim (1999). Deutsche U-Boot-Verluste von September 1939 bis Mai 1945 [German U-boat losses from September 1939 to May 1945]. Der U-Boot-Krieg (in German). Vol. IV. Hamburg, Berlin, Bonn: Mittler. ISBN 3-8132-0514-2.
- Gröner, Erich; Jung, Dieter; Maass, Martin (1991). U-boats and Mine Warfare Vessels. German Warships 1815–1945. Vol. 2. Translated by Thomas, Keith; Magowan, Rachel. London: Conway Maritime Press. ISBN 0-85177-593-4.
