= HMS Serapis (1918) =

Royal Navy S class destroyer

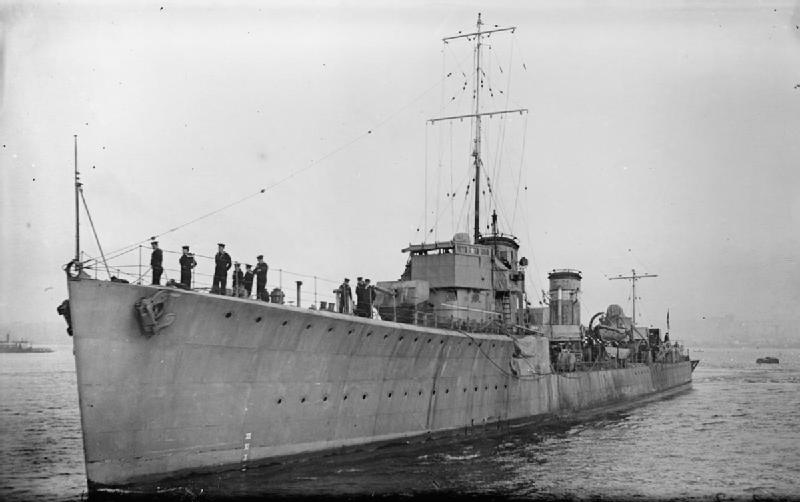
- Sister ship Serene in 1919

History

United Kingdom
- Name: HMS Serapis
- Namesake: Serapis
- Ordered: June 1917
- Builder: Denny, Dumbarton
- Yard number: 1101
- Laid down: 4 December 1917
- Launched: 17 September 1918
- Completed: 21 March 1919
- Out of service: 25 January 1934
- Fate: Sold to be broken up

General characteristics
- Class & type: S-class destroyer
- Displacement: 1,075 long tons (1,092 t) normal; 1,221 long tons (1,241 t) deep load
- Length: 265 ft (80.8 m) p.p.
- Beam: 26 ft 8 in (8.13 m)
- Draught: 9 ft 10 in (3.00 m) mean
- Propulsion: 3 Yarrow boilers; 2 geared Brown-Curtis steam turbines, 27,000 shp
- Speed: 36 knots (41.4 mph; 66.7 km/h)
- Range: 2,750 nmi (5,090 km) at 15 kn (28 km/h)
- Complement: 90
- Armament: 3 × QF 4-inch (101.6 mm) Mark IV guns, mounting P Mk. IX; 1 × single 2-pounder (40-mm) "pom-pom" Mk. II anti-aircraft gun; 4 × 21 in (533 mm) torpedo tubes (2×2)

HMS Serapis was an S-class destroyer, which served with the Royal Navy during the Greco-Turkish and Russian Civil Wars. Launched on 17 September 1918, the vessel was not completed until after the closing of the First World War. The ship joined the Seventh Destroyer Flotilla in the Reserve Fleet at Rosyth. The ship was then commissioned and sent to Constantinople to support refugees escaping from the conflicts in the Black Sea. The destroyer assisted in the evacuation of the Crimea in 1919 and helped rescue about nine hundred people from Smyrna in 1922. In 1929, Serapis was transferred to Hong Kong to serve in China. However, the signing of the London Naval Treaty in 1930 meant that the Royal Navy looked to retire older vessels. Serapis was sold to be broken up on 25 January 1934.

== Design and development ==
Serapis was one of thirty-three Admiralty S class destroyers ordered by the British Admiralty in June 1917 as part of the Twelfth War Construction Programme. The design was a development of the R class introduced as a cheaper and faster alternative to the V and W class. Differences with the R class were minor, such as having the searchlight moved aft.

Serapis had a overall length of 276 ft (84 m) and a length of 265 ft (81 m) between perpendiculars. Beam was 26 ft 8 in (8.13 m) and draught 9 ft 10 in (3.00 m). Displacement was 1,075 long tons (1,092 t) normal and 1,221 long tons (1,241 t) deep load. Three Yarrow boilers fed steam to two sets of Brown-Curtis geared steam turbines rated at 27,000 shaft horsepower (20,000 kW) and driving two shafts, giving a design speed of 36 knots (67 km/h; 41 mph) at normal loading and 32.5 knots (60.2 km/h; 37.4 mph) at deep load. Two funnels were fitted. A full load of 301 long tons (306 t) of fuel oil was carried, which gave a design range of 2,750 nautical miles (5,090 km; 3,160 mi) at 15 knots (28 km/h; 17 mph).

Armament consisted of three QF 4-inch (102 mm) Mk IV guns on the ship's centreline. One was mounted raised on the forecastle, one on a platform between the funnels and one aft. The ship also mounted a single 40-millimetre (1.6 in) 2-pounder pom-pom anti-aircraft gun for air defence. Four 21-inch (533 mm) torpedo tubes were fitted in two twin rotating mounts aft. The ship was designed to mount two additional 18-inch (457 mm) torpedo tubes either side of the superstructure but this required the forecastle plating to be cut away, making the vessel very wet, so they were removed. The weight saved enabled the heavier Mark V 21-inch torpedo to be carried. The ship had a complement of 90 officers and ratings.

== Construction and career ==
Laid down on 4 December 1917 by William Denny and Brothers in Dumbarton with the yard number 1101, Serapis was launched on 17 September 1918 and completed on 21 March 1919. The vessel was the fourth that served in the Royal Navy to be named after Serapis, the Egyptian god of healing. With the First World War closing, the destroyer saw no action before the Armistice. Instead, Serapis was commissioned into the Seventh Destroyer Flotilla as part of the Reserve Fleet at Rosyth.

However, Serapis did not remain there long. Although the war had ended, fighting then started between Greece and Turkey and, in Russia, the civil war continued. The United Kingdom decided to send units of the Royal Navy to the front line. Serapis was one of the ships chosen, and was commissioned and sailed to Constantinople. On 16 January 1920, Serapis, along with sister ships Somme and Steadfast, sailed into the Black Sea to assist in the evacuation of Russian officers' families. The destroyer arrived in Sevastopol in February. The evacuation of the Crimea continued until November. Meanwhile, the city of Smyrna had been occupied by the Greeks since 15 May 1919, but was retaken by the Turkish Army on 9 September 1922. The destroyer was called upon to support the evacuation of refugees from the city, which was complete by 30 September. Overall, the ship helped to evacuate about nine hundred people.

On 27 January 1927, the destroyer joined the Eighth Destroyer Flotilla to operate under the Commander-in-Chief, China, and was transferred to Hong Kong. Serapis was recommissioned in Hong Kong on 1 October 1929. However, the posting did not last long. On 22 April 1930, the United Kingdom signed the London Naval Treaty, which limited the total destroyer tonnage that the navy could operate. The S class was deemed out of date and ripe to be replaced with more modern ships. Serapis returned to the United Kingdom and, on 25 January 1934, the destroyer was sold to Rees of Llanelly to be broken up.

== Pennant number ==
Penant number
Pennant number	Date
F21	September 1919
D58	1922
