= 14th U-boat Flotilla =

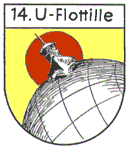
- Active: 15 December 1944–8 May 1945
- Country: Nazi Germany
- Branch: Kriegsmarine
- Type: U-boat flotilla
- Garrison/HQ: Narvik, Norway

Commanders
- Notable commanders: Kptlt. Helmut Möhlmann

The 14th U-boat Flotilla (German 14. Unterseebootsflottille) was a short-lived unit of Nazi Germany's Kriegsmarine during World War II.

The flotilla was formed on 15 December 1944 in Narvik, Norway, under the command of Kapitänleutnant Helmut Möhlmann. It was disbanded in May 1945 when Germany surrendered.

== Assigned U-boats ==
Eight U-boats were assigned to this flotilla during its service.

- U-294
- U-295
- U-299
- U-318
- U-427
- U-716
- U-995
- U-997
