= German submarine U-318 =

German World War II submarine

Coordinates: 55.7833°N 8.5000°W

History

Nazi Germany
- Name: U-318
- Ordered: 14 October 1941
- Builder: Flender Werke, Lübeck
- Yard number: 318
- Laid down: 14 October 1942
- Launched: 25 September 1943
- Commissioned: 13 November 1943
- Fate: Surrendered on 9 May 1945; sunk on 21 December 1945 as part of Operation Deadlight

General characteristics
- Class & type: Type VIIC/41 submarine
- Displacement: 759 tonnes (747 long tons) surfaced; 860 t (846 long tons) submerged
- Length: 67.10 m (220 ft 2 in) o/a; 50.50 m (165 ft 8 in) pressure hull
- Beam: 6.20 m (20 ft 4 in) o/a; 4.70 m (15 ft 5 in) pressure hull
- Height: 9.60 m (31 ft 6 in)
- Draught: 4.74 m (15 ft 7 in)
- Installed power: 2,800–3,200 PS (2,100–2,400 kW; 2,800–3,200 bhp) (diesels); 750 PS (550 kW; 740 shp) (electric)
- Propulsion: 2 shafts; 2 × diesel engines; 2 × electric motors
- Speed: 17.7 knots (32.8 km/h; 20.4 mph) surfaced; 7.6 knots (14.1 km/h; 8.7 mph) submerged
- Range: 8,500 nmi (15,700 km; 9,800 mi) at 10 knots (19 km/h; 12 mph) surfaced; 80 nmi (150 km; 92 mi) at 4 knots (7.4 km/h; 4.6 mph) submerged
- Test depth: 250 m (820 ft); Crush depth: 275–325 m (902–1,066 ft)
- Complement: 4 officers, 40–56 enlisted
- Armament: 5 × 53.3 cm (21 in) torpedo tubes (four bow, one stern); 14 × torpedoes; 1 × 8.8 cm (3.46 in) deck gun (220 rounds); 1 × 3.7 cm (1.5 in) Flak M42 AA gun; 2 × 2 cm (0.79 in) C/30 AA guns

Service record
- Part of: 4th U-boat Flotilla; 13 November 1943 – 31 July 1944; 11th U-boat Flotilla; 1 August – 4 November 1944; 13th U-boat Flotilla; 5 November 1944 – 28 February 1945; 14th U-boat Flotilla; 1 March – 8 May 1945
- Identification codes: M 54 549
- Commanders: Oblt.z.S. Josef Will; 13 November 1943 – 10 May 1945
- Operations: 6 patrols: 1st patrol: a. 31 October 1944; b. 31 October – 9 November 1944; c. 12 – 16 November 1944; 2nd patrol: a. 18 November – 19 December 1944; b. 21 – 24 December 1944; 3rd patrol: a. 7 – 10 January 1945; b. 24 – 28 January 1945; 4th patrol: a. 1 – 2 February 1945; b. 3 February – 6 March 1945; 5th patrol: 14 – 24 March 1945; 6th patrol: a. 1 – 10 May 1945; b. 12 May 1945; c. 15 – 19 May 1945
- Victories: None

German submarine U-318 was a Type VIIC/41 U-boat of Nazi Germany's Kriegsmarine during World War II.

The submarine was laid down on 14 October 1942 by the Flender Werke yard at Lübeck as yard number 318, launched on 25 September 1943, and commissioned on 13 November under the command of Oberleutnant zur See Josef Will.

She served with the 4th U-boat Flotilla for training, the 11th U-boat Flotilla from 1 August 1943 to 4 November 1944, the 13th flotilla from 5 November 1944 to 28 February 1945 and the 14th flotilla from 1 March to 8 May 1945 for operations.

She completed six patrols, but did not sink any ships.

She was a member of two wolfpacks.

The boat surrendered at Narvik in Norway on 9 May 1945. She was sunk on 21 December 1945 as part of Operation Deadlight.

== Design ==
German Type VIIC/41 submarines were preceded by the heavier Type VIIC submarines. U-318 had a displacement of 759 tonnes (747 long tons) when at the surface and 860 tonnes (850 long tons) while submerged. She had a total length of 67.10 m (220 ft 2 in), a pressure hull length of 50.50 m (165 ft 8 in), a beam of 6.20 m (20 ft 4 in), a height of 9.60 m (31 ft 6 in), and a draught of 4.74 m (15 ft 7 in). The submarine was powered by two Germaniawerft F46 four-stroke, six-cylinder supercharged diesel engines producing a total of 2,800 to 3,200 metric horsepower (2,060 to 2,350 kW; 2,760 to 3,160 shp) for use while surfaced, two Garbe, Lahmeyer & Co. RP 137/c double-acting electric motors producing a total of 750 metric horsepower (550 kW; 740 shp) for use while submerged. She had two shafts and two 1.23 m (4 ft) propellers. The boat was capable of operating at depths of up to 230 metres (750 ft).

The submarine had a maximum surface speed of 17.7 knots (32.8 km/h; 20.4 mph) and a maximum submerged speed of 7.6 knots (14.1 km/h; 8.7 mph). When submerged, the boat could operate for 80 nautical miles (150 km; 92 mi) at 4 knots (7.4 km/h; 4.6 mph); when surfaced, she could travel 8,500 nautical miles (15,700 km; 9,800 mi) at 10 knots (19 km/h; 12 mph). U-318 was fitted with five 53.3 cm (21 in) torpedo tubes (four fitted at the bow and one at the stern), fourteen torpedoes, one 8.8 cm (3.46 in) SK C/35 naval gun, (220 rounds), one 3.7 cm (1.5 in) Flak M42 and two 2 cm (0.79 in) C/30 anti-aircraft guns. The boat had a complement of between forty-four and sixty.

== Service history ==
Her patrols used a variety of bases in Norway: e.g. Egersund, Bergen, Kristiansand, Arendal, Trondheim, Bogenbucht, Kilbotn, Harstad and Narvik, but none of them was longer than 32 days.

=== Fate ===
At the end of World War II, she surrendered at Narvik on 10 May 1945. She was moved to Skjomenfjord, then Loch Eriboll in Scotland, arriving there on 19 May. She was moved again to Loch Ryan for Operation Deadlight and sunk on 21 December north of Northern Ireland.

== See also ==
- Battle of the Atlantic (1939-1945)

== Bibliography ==
- Gröner, Erich; Jung, Dieter; Maass, Martin (1991). U-boats and Mine Warfare Vessels. German Warships 1815–1945. Vol. 2. Translated by Thomas, Keith; Magowan, Rachel. London: Conway Maritime Press. ISBN 0-85177-593-4.
- Busch, Rainer; Röll, Hans-Joachim (1999). German U-boat commanders of World War II : a biographical dictionary. Translated by Brooks, Geoffrey. London, Annapolis, Md: Greenhill Books, Naval Institute Press. ISBN 1-55750-186-6.
- Busch, Rainer; Röll, Hans-Joachim (1999). Der U-Boot-Krieg, 1939-1945: Deutsche U-Boot-Verluste von September 1939 bis Mai 1945 [German U-boat losses from September 1939 to May 1945] (in German). Vol. IV. Hamburg, Berlin, Bonn: Mittler. ISBN 3-8132-0514-2.
