= HMS Thruster =

Three ships of the British Royal Navy have been named HMS Thruster:

- HMS Thruster (1917) was a R-class destroyer launched in 1917 and broken up in 1937.
- HMS Thruster (F131) was a Landing Ship, Tank launched in 1942 and transferred to the Royal Netherlands Navy in 1947 and named Pelikaan.
- HMS Thruster (1945) was a Landing Ship, Tank launched in 1945 as HMS LST 3520. She was renamed HMS Thruster in 1947. Transferred to the Ministry of Transport in 1956 and renamed Empire Petrel. She was sold in 1968.
