= HMS Pathfinder =

Two ships of the Royal Navy have borne the name HMS Pathfinder.

- HMS Pathfinder (1904), launched in 1904, was a scout cruiser, the lead ship of her class. She was sunk at the start of World War I by U-21, becoming the first ship to ever be sunk by a torpedo fired by submarine.
- HMS Pathfinder (G10), launched in 1941, was a P-class destroyer. She served in World War II, sank the German submarines U-162 and U-203, and was rendered a constructive loss by air attack off Ramree Island, Burma on 11 February 1945, she was finally broken up at Milford Haven in November 1948.
