= HMS Spartan =

HMS Spartan may refer to one of these vessels of the British Royal Navy named in recognition of the military abilities of the Spartans of ancient Greece.

- HMS Spartan (1806) was a 38-gun fifth rate launched in 1806 and broken up in 1822
- HMS Spartan was to have been a 46-gun fifth rate; ordered from Plymouth Dockyard in 1824, the ship was cancelled in 1831
- HMS Spartan (1841) was a 26-gun sixth rate launched in 1841 and sold in 1862
- HMS Spartan (1868) was an Eclipse-class wooden screw sloop launched in 1868 and sold in 1882
- HMS Spartan (1891) was a second class cruiser launched in 1891, sent to harbour service in 1907, renamed Defiance in 1921, and sold in 1931
- HMS Spartan (95) was a Dido-class cruiser launched in 1942 and sunk in 1944 by a Hs 293 guided bomb
- HMS Spartan (S105) is a nuclear-powered Swiftsure-class submarine launched in 1978

== Battle Honours ==
- Bay of Naples, 1810
- Burma, 1853
- China, 1856–57
- Atlantic, 1943
- Mediterranean, 1944
- Anzio, 1944
- Falklands, 1982

== See also ==
- HMS Spartiate
