= HMS Steadfast =

Royal Navy S class destroyer

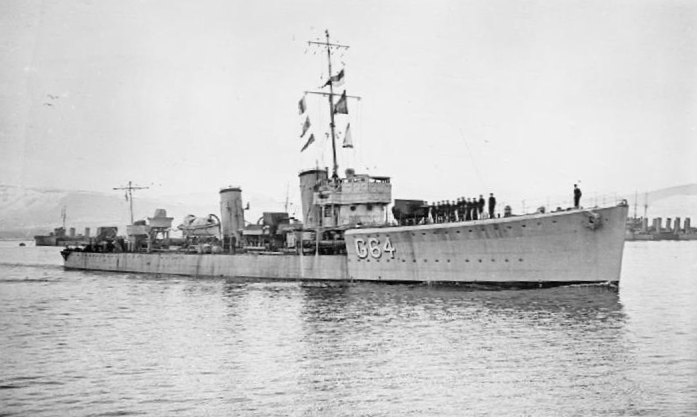
- Sister ship Strenuous

History

United Kingdom
- Name: Steadfast
- Ordered: 7 April 1917
- Builder: Palmers, Jarrow
- Laid down: September 1917
- Launched: 8 August 1918
- Completed: March 1919
- Out of service: 28 July 1934
- Fate: Sold to be broken up

General characteristics
- Class & type: S-class destroyer
- Displacement: 1,075 long tons (1,092 t) normal; 1,221 long tons (1,241 t) deep load
- Length: 265 ft (80.8 m) p.p.
- Beam: 26 ft 9 in (8.15 m)
- Draught: 9 ft 10 in (3.00 m) mean
- Propulsion: 3 Yarrow boilers; 2 geared Parsons steam turbines, 27,000 shp
- Speed: 36 knots (41.4 mph; 66.7 km/h)
- Range: 2,750 nmi (5,090 km) at 15 kn (28 km/h)
- Complement: 90
- Armament: 3 × single QF 4 in (102 mm) guns; 1 × single 2-pdr 40 mm (2 in) Mk. II AA gun; 2 × twin 21 in (533 mm) torpedo tubes; 4 × depth charge chutes

HMS Steadfast was an Admiralty S-class destroyer that served with the Royal Navy in the Russian Civil War. The S class was a development of the R class created during the First World War as a cheaper alternative to the V and W class. Launched in 1918 just before the Armistice, the ship was commissioned into the Mediterranean Fleet and was soon in action as part of the Royal Navy operation supporting the White Russians in the Black Sea. In 1919, Steadfast accompanied the monitor M29 in bombarding a Russian battery in Ochakiv and, the following year, took part in action north of the Georgian city of Poti alongside the light cruiser Caradoc. Soon afterwards, the destroyer returned to Chatham and was placed in reserve at Nore. Steadfast was retired and sold to be broken up in 1934.

== Design and development ==
Steadfast was one of 33 Admiralty S-class destroyers ordered by the British Admiralty on 7 April 1917 as part of the Eleventh War Construction Programme. The design was a development of the R class introduced at the same time as, and as a cheaper and faster alternative to, the V and W class. Differences with the R class were minor, such as having the searchlight moved aft and being designed to mount an additional pair of torpedo tubes.

The destroyer had a overall length of 276 ft (84 m) and a length of 265 ft (81 m) between perpendiculars. Beam was 26 ft 8 in (8.13 m) and mean draught 9 ft 10 in (3.00 m). Displacement was 1,075 long tons (1,092 t) normal and 1,221 long tons (1,241 t) deep load. Three Yarrow boilers fed steam to two sets of Parsons geared steam turbines rated at 27,000 shaft horsepower (20,000 kW) and driving two shafts, giving a design speed of 36 knots (67 km/h; 41 mph) at normal loading and 32.5 knots (60.2 km/h; 37.4 mph) at deep load. Two funnels were fitted. A full load of 301 long tons (306 t) of fuel oil was carried, which gave a design range of 2,750 nautical miles (5,090 km; 3,160 mi) at 15 knots (28 km/h; 17 mph).

Armament consisted of three QF 4 in (102 mm) Mk IV guns on the ship's centreline. One was mounted raised on the forecastle, one on a platform between the funnels, and one aft. The ship also mounted a single 2-pounder 40 mm (1.6 in) "pom-pom" anti-aircraft gun for air defence. Four 21 in (533 mm) torpedo tubes were carried in two twin rotating mounts aft. Four depth charge chutes were also fitted aft. Initially, typically ten depth charges were carried. The ship was designed to mount two additional 18 in (457 mm) torpedo tubes either side of the superstructure but this required the forecastle plating to be cut away, causing excess water to come aboard at sea, so they were removed. The weight saved enabled the heavier Mark V 21-inch torpedo to be carried. Fire control included a training-only director, single Dumaresq and a Vickers range clock. The ship had a complement of 90 officers and ratings.

== Construction and career ==
Laid down in September 1917 during the First World War by Palmers at their dockyard in Jarrow, Steadfast was launched on 8 August 1918 shortly before the Armistice that ended the war and completed in March the following year. The ship was the first to be given the name, and the hundredth warship supplied by the shipyard, to the Royal Navy. Steadfast was commissioned into the Sixth Destroyer Flotilla, joining the Mediterranean Fleet under the dreadnought battleship Iron Duke. The destroyer was soon in action supporting the Southern Russia intervention in support of the White Russians in the Russian Civil War. On 2 May, Steadfast accompanied the monitor M29 to patrol in the Bay of Arabat and off the coast of Feodosia. On the 13 August, the warships destroyed part of an onshore battery of 6 in (150 mm) guns at Ochakiv. The vessel served again off Crimea on 23 August.

Steadfast started the following year based at Malta on a break from the fighting. The respite was short and, on 16 January, the destroyer joined Iron Duke, sister ships Serapis and Somme on a sortie from the island back into the Black Sea. On 7 March, the warship 31 refugees fleeing the conflict to Tuapse, although the authorities refused to allow them to land and so they were transhipped to a Russian vessel to continue their flight. On 26 March, the destroyer helped evacuate British personnel from Sevastopol. The vessel was back in action north of the Georgian city of Poti along with the light cruiser Caradoc on 15 April. It was clear, however, that the situation was increasingly turning away from the White Russians and the British government withdrew support for military action two months later. The destroyer returned to Chatham on 16 June.

On 20 June, Steadfast was re-commissioned into the Reserve Fleet at Nore. The destroyer was allocated to Plymouth, serving there until after 27 December 1933. Since 22 April 1930, the London Naval Treaty had limited total destroyer tonnage in the Navy and, with new warships entering service, there was a need to retire some of the older vessels. On 28 July 1934, it was Steadfast's turn and the destroyer was sold to be broken up by Metal Industries at Charlestown.

== Pennant numbers ==
Penant numbers
Pennant number	Date
F24	November 1919
F78	January 1919
F99	March 1919
H37	January 1922
