= German submarine U-995 =

German World War II submarine

Coordinates: 54°24′45″N 10°13′44″E

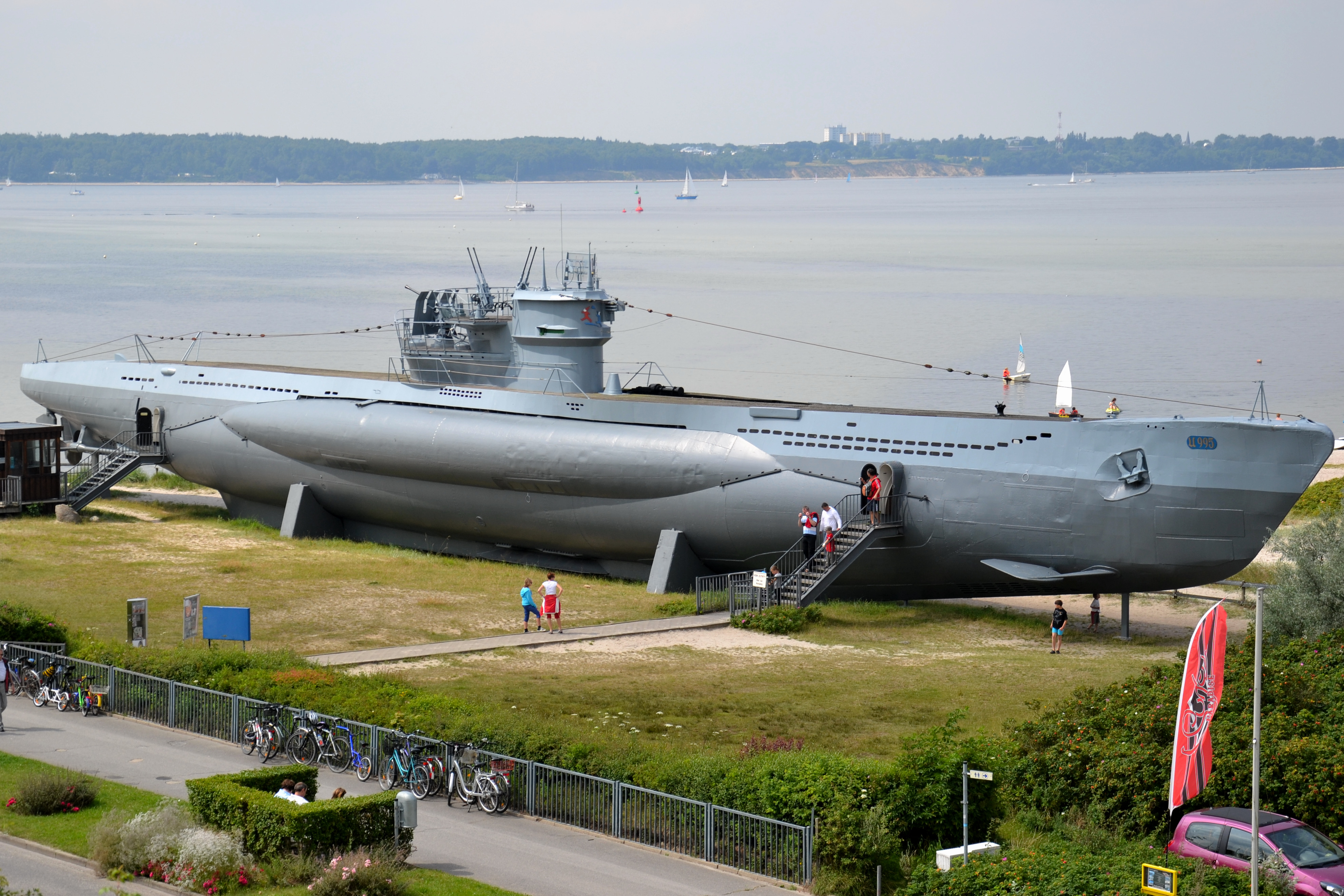
- U-995 Type VIIC/41 at the Laboe Naval Memorial

History

Germany
- Name: U-995
- Ordered: 14 October 1941
- Builder: Blohm & Voss, Hamburg
- Yard number: 195
- Laid down: 25 November 1942
- Launched: 22 July 1943
- Commissioned: 16 September 1943
- Reclassified: S 309 (October 1948)
- Identification: M 55 055
- Fate: Surrendered on 9 May 1945

Norway
- Name: Kaura
- Namesake: Kaura Lighthouse
- Acquired: October 1948
- Commissioned: 1 December 1952
- Decommissioned: 1965
- Status: Museum ship at Laboe Naval Memorial since October 1971
- Notes: Otherwise same as built

General characteristics
- Class & type: Type VIIC/41 submarine
- Displacement: 759 tonnes (747 long tons) surfaced; 860 t (846 long tons) submerged
- Length: 67.10 m (220 ft 2 in) o/a; 50.50 m (165 ft 8 in) pressure hull
- Beam: 6.20 m (20 ft 4 in) o/a; 4.70 m (15 ft 5 in) pressure hull
- Draught: 4.74 m (15 ft 7 in)
- Installed power: 2,800–3,200 PS (2,100–2,400 kW; 2,800–3,200 bhp) (diesels); 750 PS (550 kW; 740 shp) (electric)
- Propulsion: 2 shafts; 2 × diesel engines; 2 × electric motors
- Speed: 17.7 knots (32.8 km/h; 20.4 mph) surfaced; 7.6 knots (14.1 km/h; 8.7 mph) submerged
- Range: 8,500 nmi (15,700 km; 9,800 mi) at 10 knots (19 km/h; 12 mph) surfaced; 80 nmi (150 km; 92 mi) at 4 knots (7.4 km/h; 4.6 mph) submerged
- Test depth: 230 m (750 ft); Calculated crush depth: 250–295 m (820–968 ft)
- Complement: 4 officers, 40–56 enlisted
- Armament: 5 × 53.3 cm (21 in) torpedo tubes (4 bow, 1 stern); 14 × torpedoes

Service record (Kriegsmarine)
- Part of: 5th U-boat Flotilla; 16 September 1943 – 31 May 1944; 13th U-boat Flotilla; 1 June 1944 – 28 February 1945; 14th U-boat Flotilla; 1 March – 8 May 1945
- Identification codes: M 55 055
- Commanders: Oblt.z.S. / Kptlt. Walter Köhntopp; 16 September 1943 – 9 October 1944; Oblt.z.S. Hans-Georg Hess; 10 October 1944 – 9 May 1945
- Operations: 9 patrols: 1st patrol: a. 18 – 23 May 1944; b. 30 June – 1 July 1944; 2nd patrol: a. 3 – 28 July 1944; b. 30 July – 2 August 1944; c. 17 – 19 August 1944; d. 23 – 24 August 1944; e. 26 August 1944; 3rd patrol: a. 29 August – 11 September 1944; b. 12 – 14 September 1944; 4th patrol: 25 September – 3 October 1944; 5th patrol: 14 October – 11 November 1944; 6th patrol: 30 November – 9 December 1944; 7th patrol: 11 December 1944 – 7 January 1945; 8th patrol: 2 February – 6 March 1945; 9th patrol: a. 13 – 25 March 1945; b. 26 – 28 March 1945
- Victories: 3 merchant ships sunk (1,560 GRT); 1 warship sunk (105 tons); 1 auxiliary warship sunk (633 GRT); 1 merchant ship total loss (7,176 GRT)

German submarine U-995 is a Type VIIC/41 U-boat of Germany's Kriegsmarine. She was laid down on 25 November 1942 by Blohm & Voss in Hamburg, Germany, and commissioned on 16 September 1943 with Oberleutnant zur See Walter Köhntopp in command. She is preserved at Laboe Naval Memorial near Kiel, Germany.

== Design ==
German Type VIIC/41 submarines were preceded by the heavier Type VIIC submarines. U-995 had a displacement of 759 tonnes (747 long tons) when at the surface and 860 tonnes (850 long tons) while submerged. She had a total length of 67.10 m (220 ft 2 in), a pressure hull length of 50.50 m (165 ft 8 in), a beam of 6.20 m (20 ft 4 in), a height of 9.60 m (31 ft 6 in), and a draught of 4.74 m (15 ft 7 in). The submarine was powered by two Germaniawerft F46 four-stroke, six-cylinder supercharged diesel engines producing a total of 2,800 to 3,200 metric horsepower (2,060 to 2,350 kW; 2,760 to 3,160 shp) for use while surfaced, two Brown, Boveri & Cie GG UB 720/8 double-acting electric motors producing a total of 750 metric horsepower (550 kW; 740 shp) for use while submerged. She had two shafts and two 1.23 m (4 ft) propellers. The boat was capable of operating at depths of up to 230 metres (750 ft).

The submarine had a maximum surface speed of 17.7 knots (32.8 km/h; 20.4 mph) and a maximum submerged speed of 7.6 knots (14.1 km/h; 8.7 mph). When submerged, the boat could operate for 80 nautical miles (150 km; 92 mi) at 4 knots (7.4 km/h; 4.6 mph); when surfaced, she could travel 8,500 nautical miles (15,700 km; 9,800 mi) at 10 knots (19 km/h; 12 mph). U-995 was fitted with five 53.3 cm (21 in) torpedo tubes (four fitted at the bow and one at the stern), fourteen torpedoes, and three anti-aircraft guns. The boat had a complement of between forty-four and sixty.

== Armament ==
=== FLAK weaponry ===
U-995 was mounted with a single 3.7 cm Flak M42 gun on the LM 42U mount. The LM 42U mount was the most common mount used with the 3.7 cm Flak M42U. The 3.7 cm Flak M42U was the marine version of the 3.7 cm Flak and was also used by the Kriegsmarine on other Type VII and Type IX U-boats.

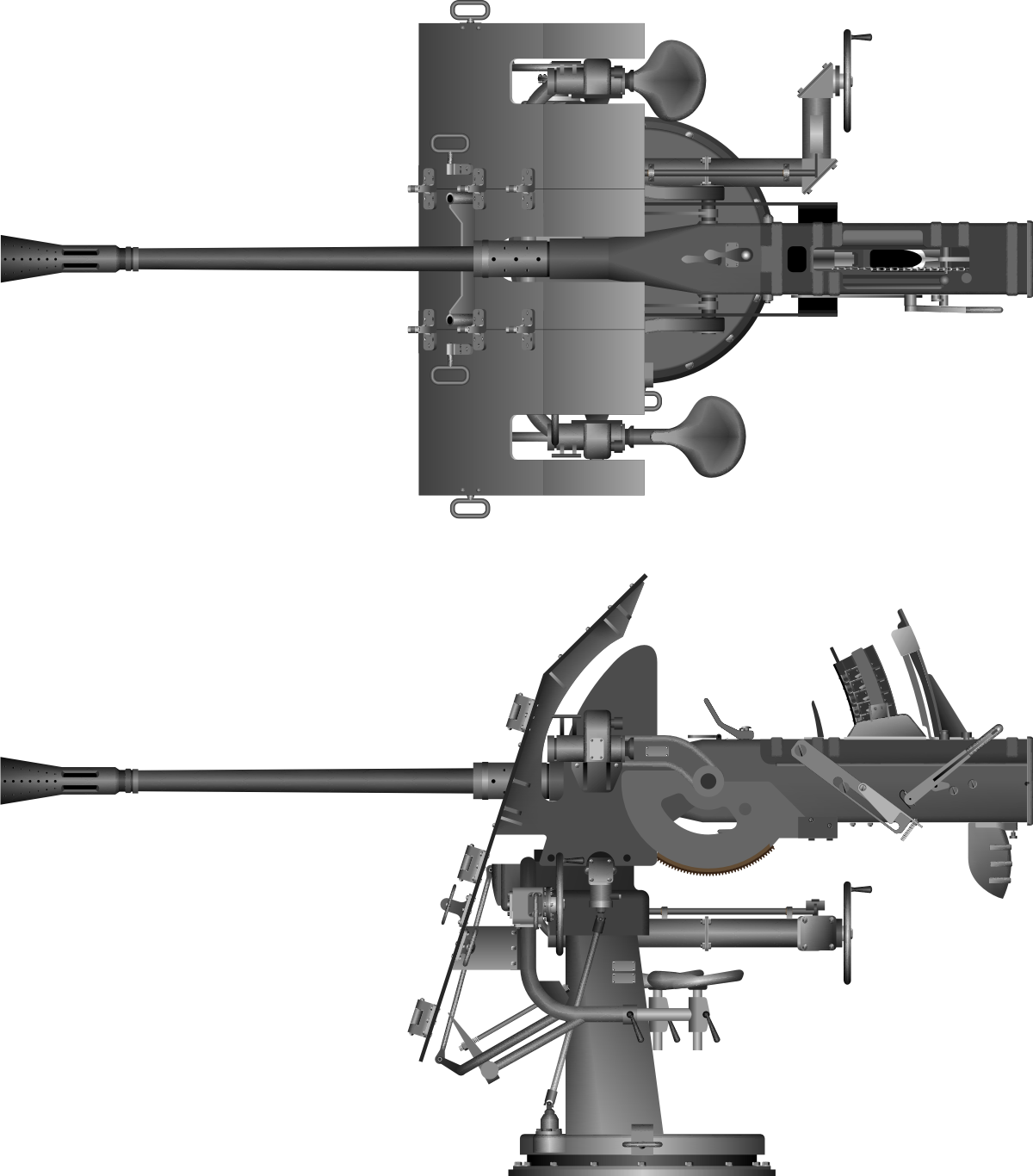
A single 3.7 cm Flak M42U gun on the LM 42U mount.

Additionally, the boat was armed with a pair of twin Flak 38 20mm "Flakzwilling" mounts immediately adjacent to the 37mm gun mount.

== Sonar ==
=== Passive sonar ===
U-995 was fitted with a Royal Norwegian Navy design Balkongerät sometime during the 1960s and then removed sometime between 4 November 1971 and 13 March 1972.

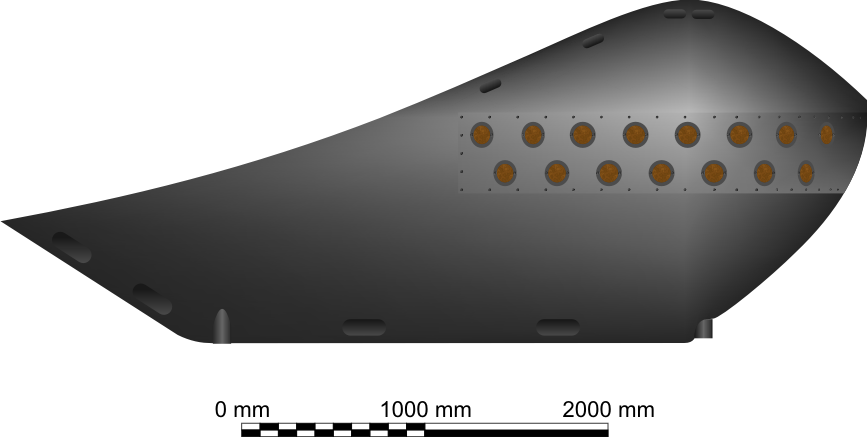
An exterior view of a U-995 Balkongerät

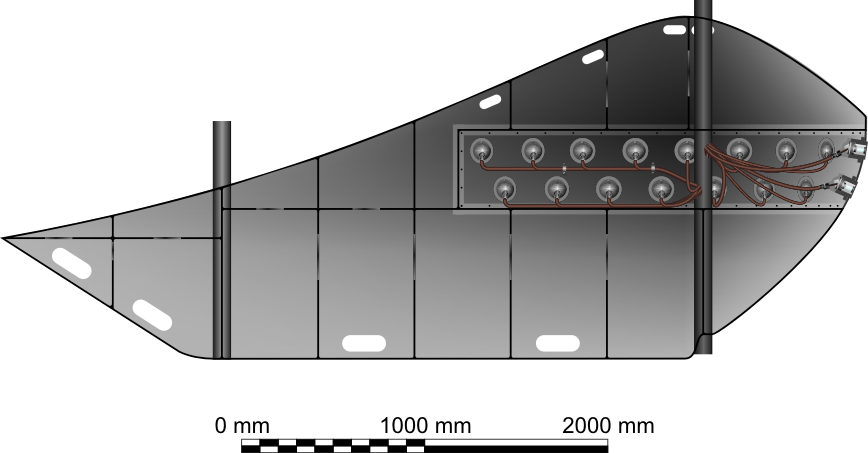
An interior view of a U-995 Balkongerät

== Service history ==
The boat's career began with training at 5th Flotilla on 16 September 1943, followed by active service on 1 June 1944 as part of the 13th Flotilla. She later transferred to 14th Flotilla on 1 March 1945.

=== Wolfpacks ===
U-995 took part in five wolfpacks, namely:

- Dachs (1–5 September 1944)
- Zorn (26 September – 1 October 1944)
- Panther (16 October – 10 November 1944)
- Stier (11 December 1944 – 6 January 1945)
- Hagen (17–21 March 1945)

=== Fate ===
At the end of the war, on 8 May 1945, U-995 was stricken at Trondheim, Norway. She was surrendered to the British on 9 December and then transferred to Norwegian ownership in October 1948. On 1 December 1952 U-995 became the Norwegian submarine Kaura (Norwegian K class) and in 1965 she was stricken from service by the Royal Norwegian Navy. She then was offered to the West German government for the ceremonial price of one Deutsche Mark. The offer was refused; however, the boat was saved by the German Navy League, DMB. U-995 became a museum ship at Laboe Naval Memorial in October 1971.

== Summary of raiding history ==
Date	Ship Name	Nationality	Tonnage (Note: Merchant ship tonnages are in gross register tons. Military vessels are listed by tons displacement.)	Fate
5 December 1944	Proletarij	Soviet Union	1,123	Sunk
21 December 1944	Reshitel'nyj	Soviet Union	20	Sunk
26 December 1944	RT-52 Som	Soviet Union	417	Sunk
29 December 1944	T-883 (No 37)	Soviet Navy	633	Sunk
2 March 1945	BO-224	Soviet Navy	105	Sunk
20 March 1945	Horace Bushnell	United States	7,176	Total loss

== Gallery ==
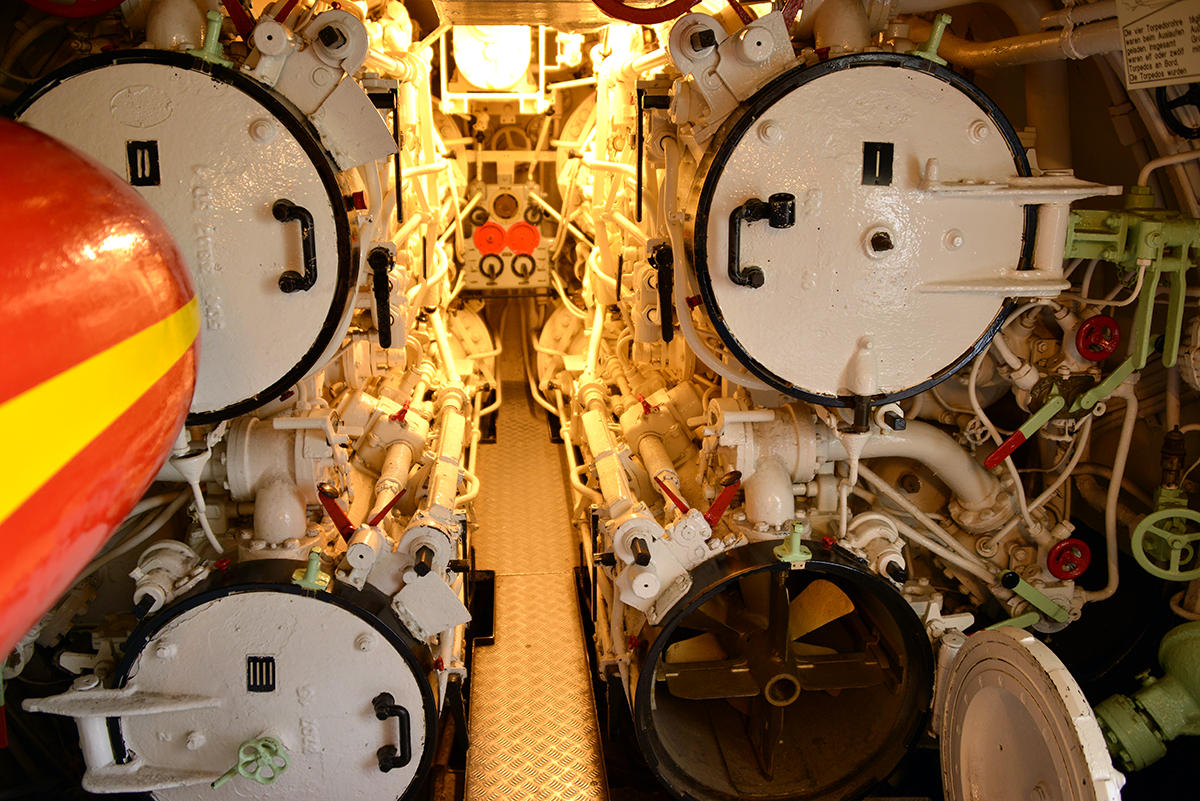
U-995 forward torpedo tubes

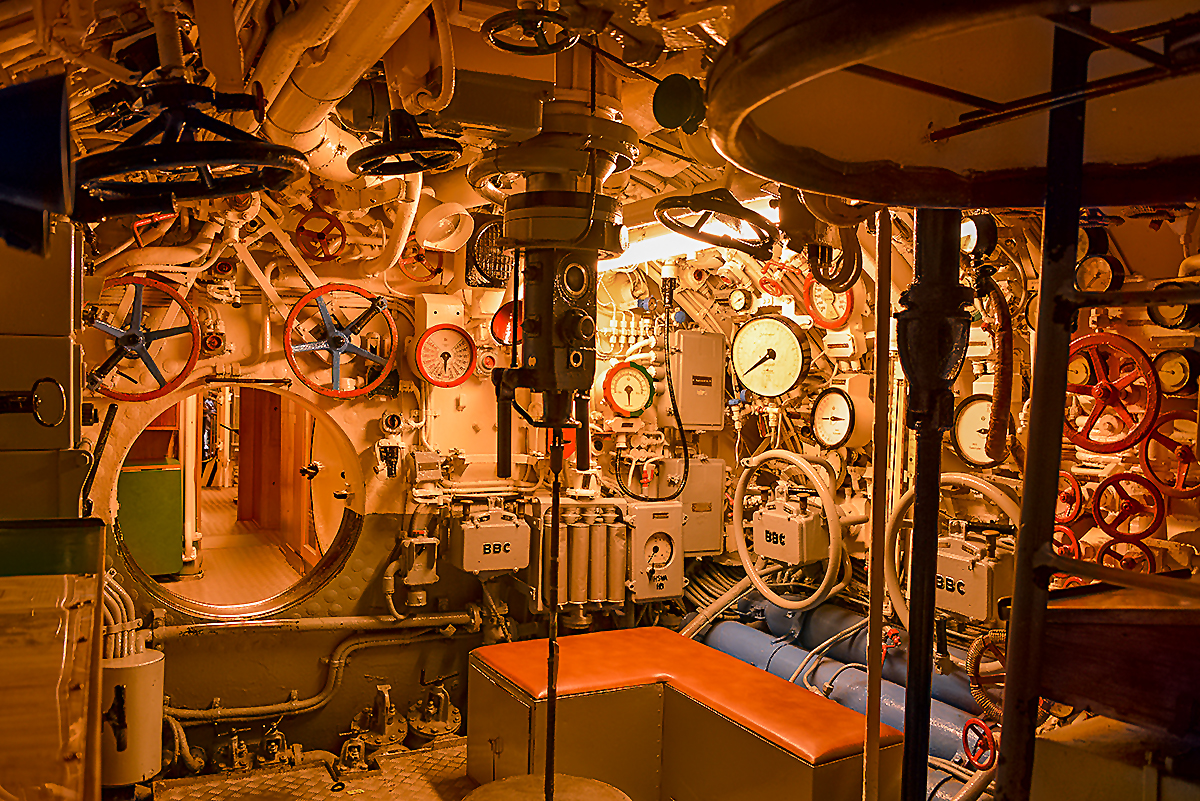
U-995 control room

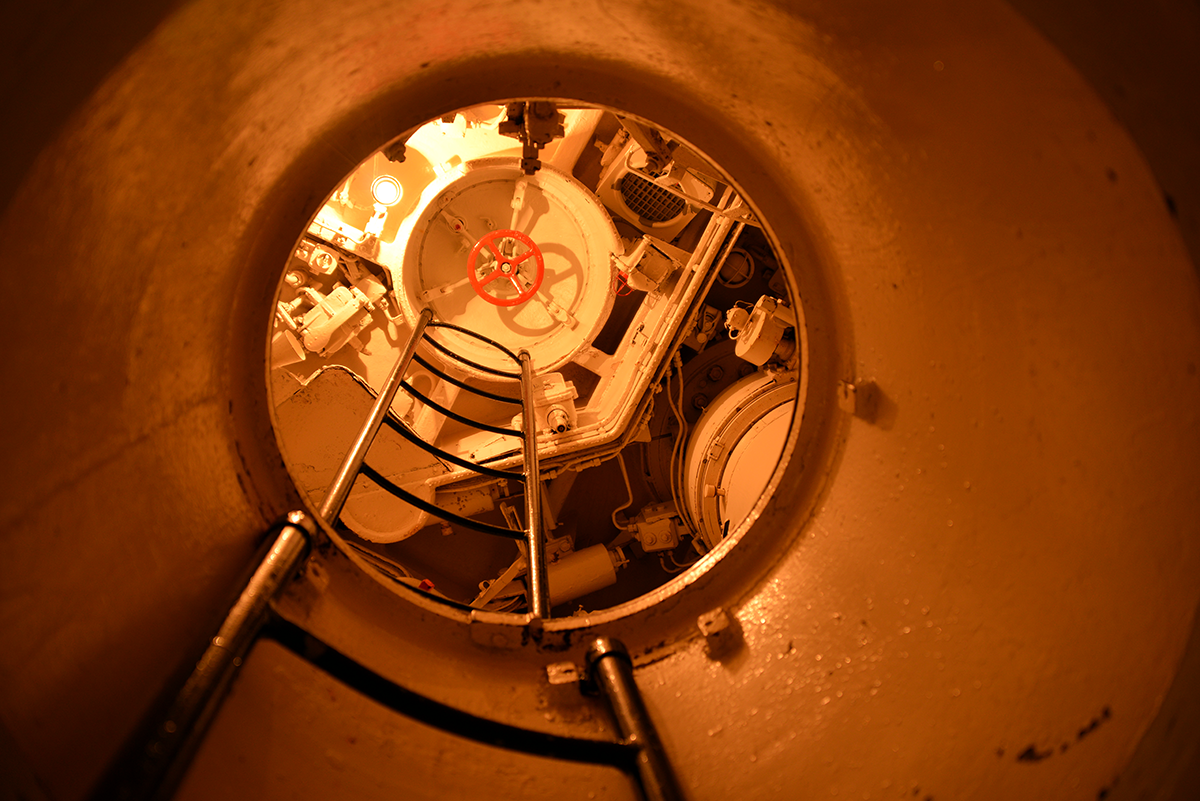
U-995 hatches

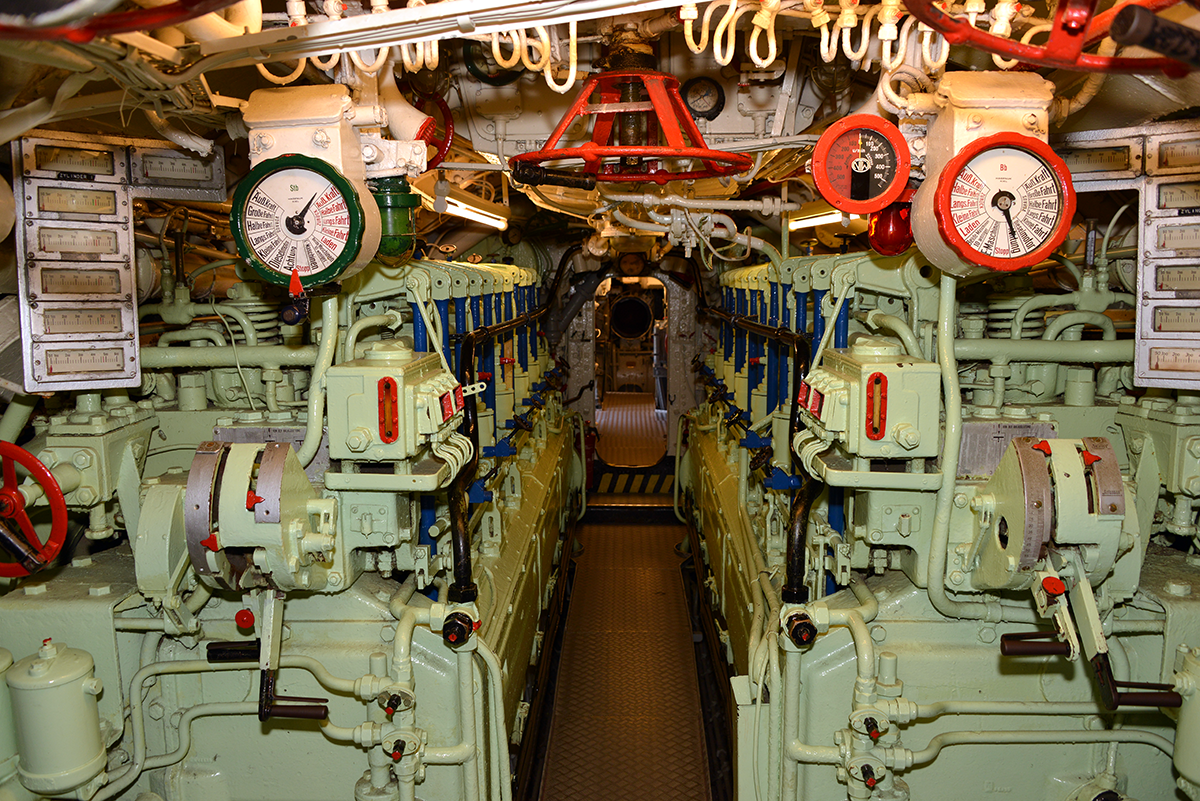
U-995 diesel engine room

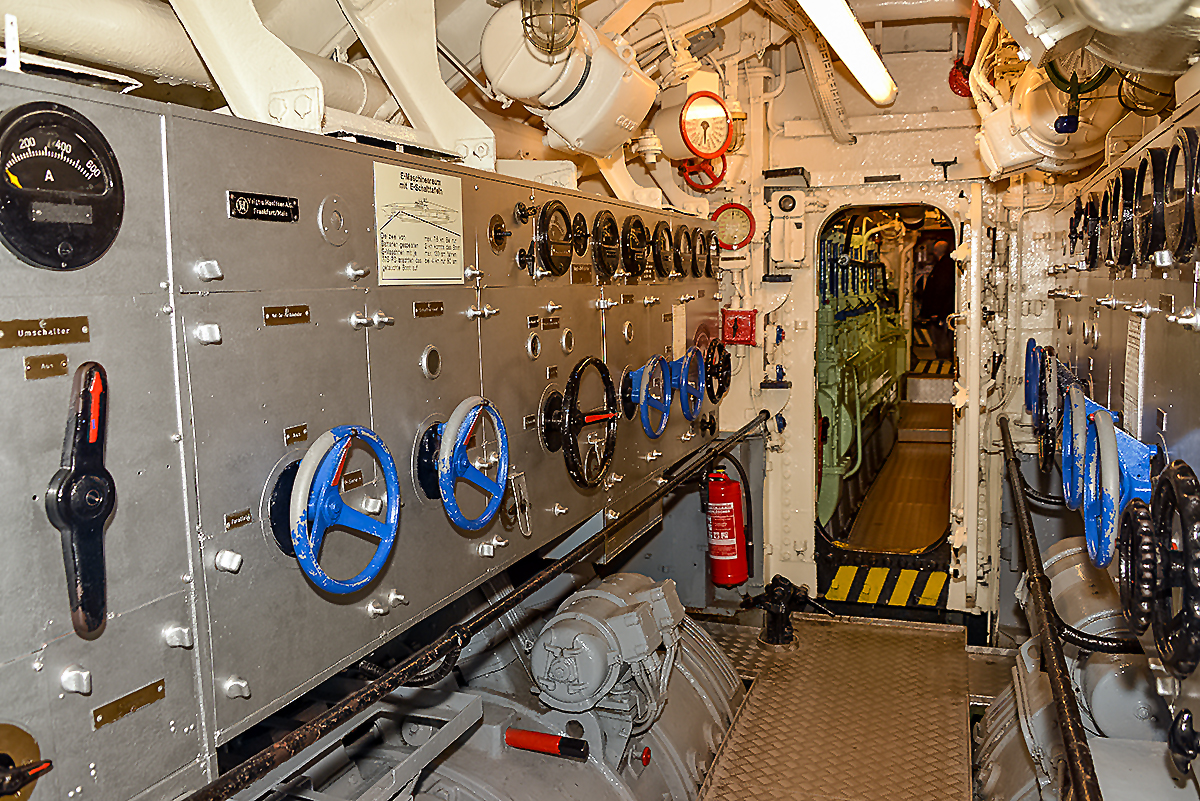
U-995 electric motor compartment

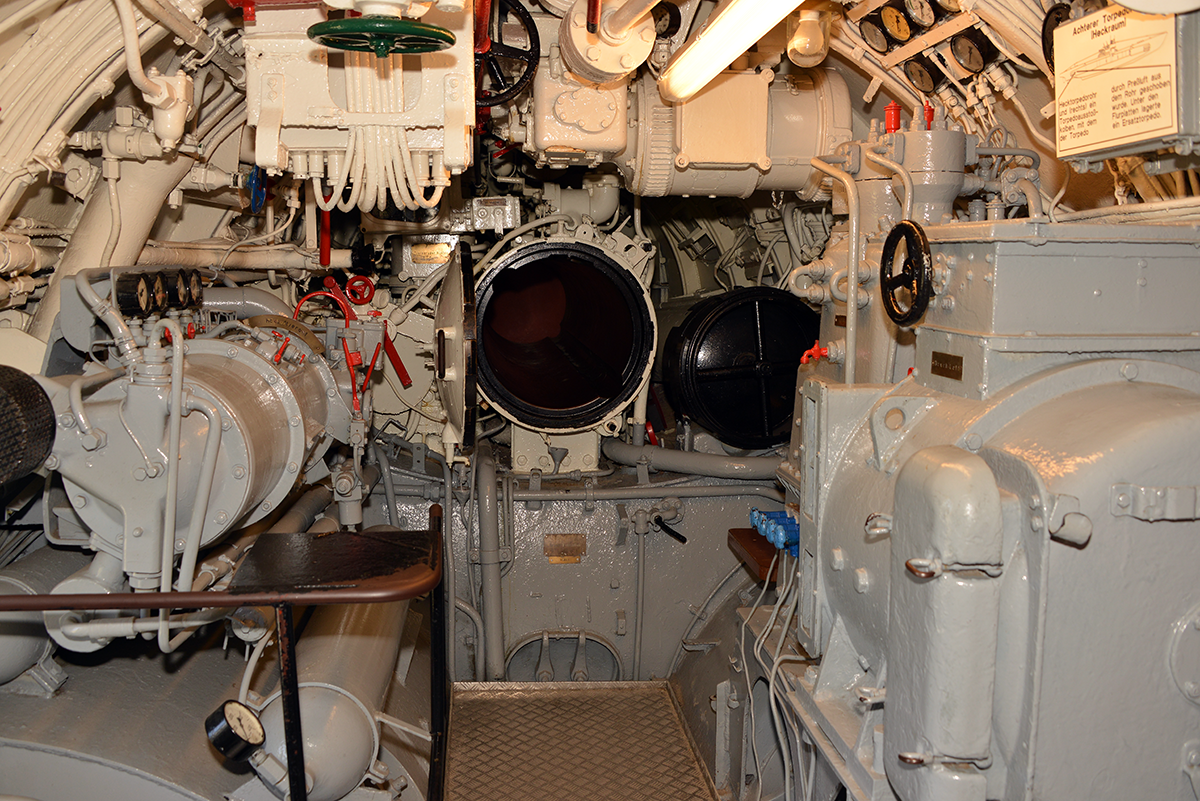
U-995 aft torpedo compartment

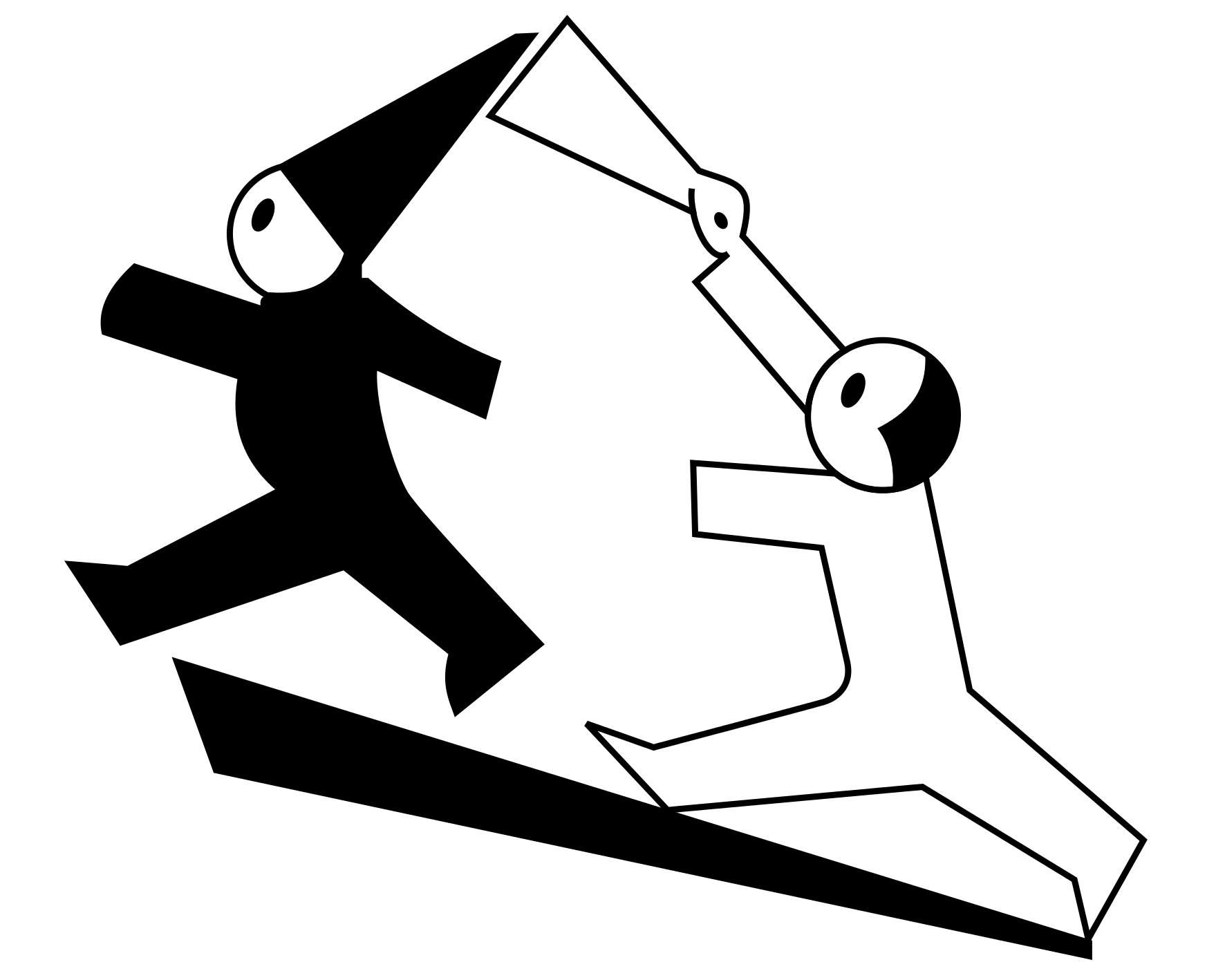
Turret logo of U-995, referencing the board game Fang den Hut!

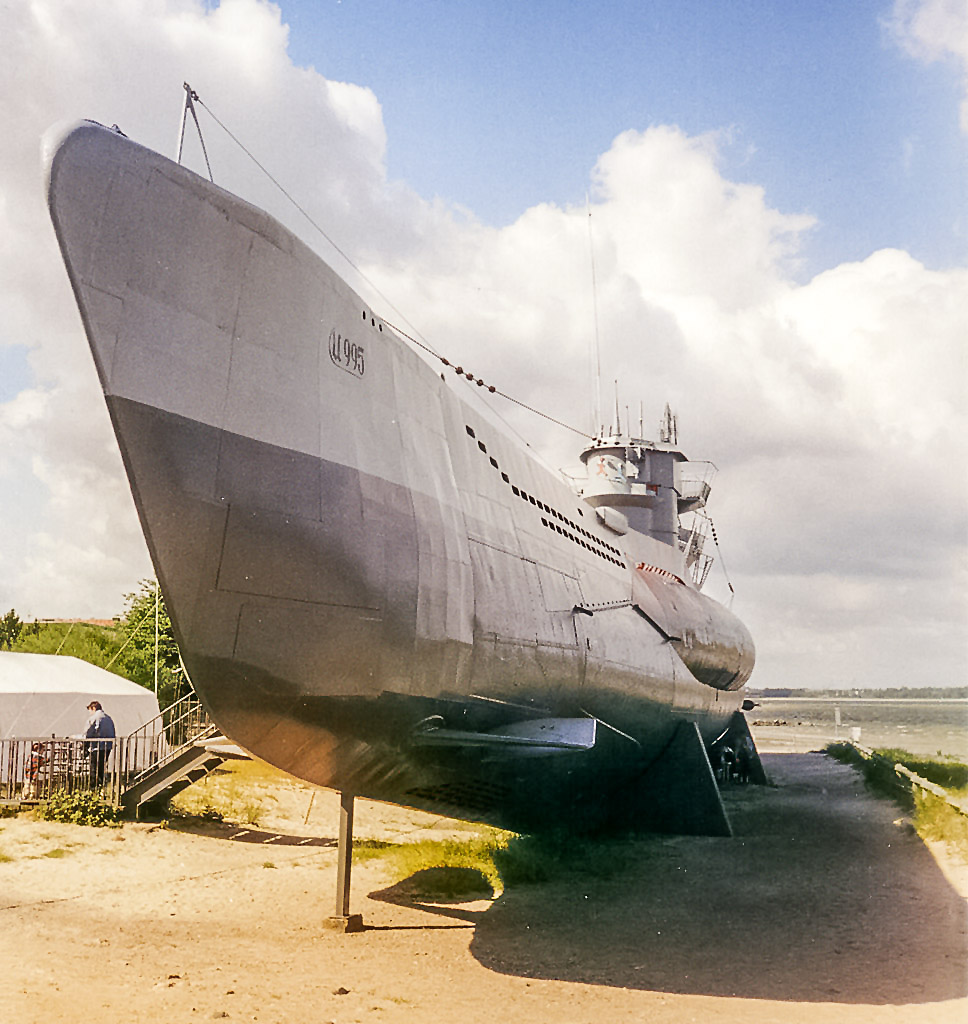
View of the bow

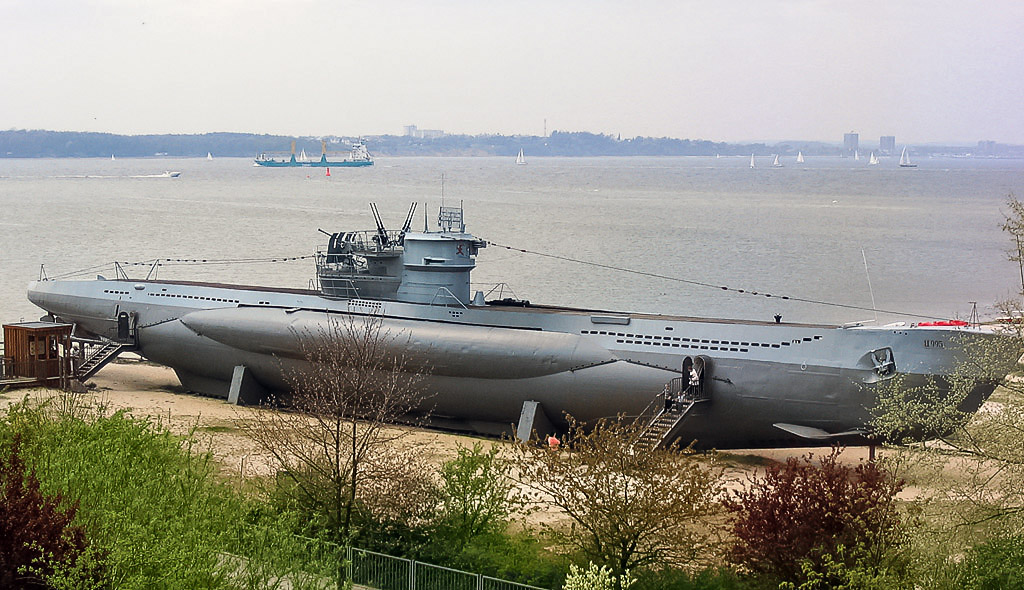
Starboard view

== See also ==
- List of submarine museums

=== Other surviving U-boats ===
- SM U-1
- U-505
- U-534
- U-2540

== Bibliography ==
- Clay Blair : Hitler's U-Boat War Vol II (1998). ISBN 978-0-394-58839-1
- Gröner, Erich; Jung, Dieter; Maass, Martin (1991). German Warships 1815–1945, U-boats and Mine Warfare Vessels. Vol. 2. Translated by Thomas, Keith; Magowan, Rachel. London: Conway Maritime Press. ISBN 0-85177-593-4.
- Busch, Rainer; Röll, Hans-Joachim (1999). German U-boat commanders of World War II : a biographical dictionary. Translated by Brooks, Geoffrey. London, Annapolis, Md: Greenhill Books, Naval Institute Press. ISBN 1-55750-186-6.
- Busch, Rainer; Röll, Hans-Joachim (1999). Deutsche U-Boot-Verluste von September 1939 bis Mai 1945 [German U-boat losses from September 1939 to May 1945]. Der U-Boot-Krieg (in German). Vol. IV. Hamburg; Berlin; Bonn: Mittler. ISBN 3-8132-0514-2.
