= HMS Powerful =

Four ships of the Royal Navy have borne the name HMS Powerful.

Ships

- HMS Powerful (1783) was a 74-gun third rate launched in 1783 and broken up in 1812.
- HMS Powerful (1826) was an 84-gun second rate launched in 1826. She was used as a target from 1860 and was broken up by 1864.
- HMS Powerful (1895) was a Powerful-class protected cruiser launched in 1895. She became a training ship in 1919 and was renamed HMS Impregnable, and was sold in 1929.
- HMS Powerful (R95) was a Majestic-class aircraft carrier laid down in 1943 and launched in 1945. Work was suspended in 1946, but resumed in 1952 and sold to Canada. She was relaunched in 1956 and renamed HMCS Bonaventure. She was broken up in 1971.

Establishments

- HMS Powerful II was a training establishment at Devonport aboard HMS Andromeda between 1913 and 1919.
- HMS Powerful III was training establishment at Devonport aboard HMS Caroline between 1913 and 1919.
