= USS Undaunted =

USS Undaunted may refer to the following ships of the United States Navy:

- USS Undaunted (AT-58) an Undaunted-class fleet tug built in 1917 and struck in 1946
- USS Undaunted (ATA-199) Sotoyomo-class tugboat built in 1944 and transferred to NOAA in 1963

== See also ==
- HMS Undaunted
