= HMS Vigilant =

Thirteen ships of the Royal Navy have borne the name HMS Vigilant:

- HMS Vigilant (1745) ex-French Vigilant captured 19 May 1745, sold 1759.
- HMS Vigilant (1755) was a schooner that served on the Canadian lakes. The French captured her in 1756.
- HMS Vigilant (1774) was a 64-gun third rate ship of the line, built in 1774. She was converted to a prison ship in 1799, and sank in 1806. She was raised several months later, and broken up in 1814.
- HMS Vigilant (1777) was an armed ship purchased in 1777, formerly Empress of Russia. She was burnt as unfit in 1780.
- HMS Vigilant (1803) was a schooner, purchased in 1803 and sold in 1808.
- HMS Vigilant (1806) was previously the French schooner Impériale, that the packet Duke of Montrose and HMS Cygnet captured in 1806. The Royal Navy initially named her Vigilant, and later that year, renamed her Subtle. She was wrecked off Bermuda in 1807.
- HMS Vigilant (1821) was a cutter built in 1821 and sold in 1832.
- HMS Vigilant (1846) was a wood screw frigate, ordered in 1846, but cancelled in 1849.
- HMS Vigilant (1856) was a wood screw gunvessel, built in 1856 and sold in 1869.
- HMS Vigilant (1871) was a wood paddle dispatch boat, built in 1871, and sold in 1886 to serve as a dispatch boat in Hong Kong.
- HMS Vigilant (1900) was a C-class destroyer, built speculatively by the yards of John Brown & Company, launched in 1900 and bought that year by the navy. She was sold in 1920 for breaking up.
- HMS Vigilant (R93) was a V-class destroyer that saw service during World War II. She was later converted into a Type 15 fast anti-submarine frigate.
- HMS Vigilant (1975) was a patrol boat launched in March 1975, and renamed Meavy in July 1986.
- HMS Vigilant (S30) is a Vanguard-class submarine, commissioned in November 1996 and currently in service.

== See also ==
- Two similarly named ships, HMS Vigilante
