= HMS Zealous =

Three ships of the Royal Navy have borne the name HMS Zealous, whilst another had been planned, but was cancelled.

- HMS Zealous (1785), a 74-gun ship, launched in 1785 and broken up in 1816. She served at the Battle of the Nile.
- HMS Zealous (1864), a second-rate ship of the line, later converted to an ironclad.
- HMS Zealous (1919), was a planned modified W-class destroyer, cancelled in 1919.
- HMS Zealous (R39) was a Z-class destroyer built in 1944. She was commissioned into the Israeli Navy as Eilat and sunk in 1967.
