= HMS Undaunted =

Nine ships of the Royal Navy have borne the name HMS Undaunted:

- HMS Undaunted (1794) was a 28-gun sixth rate, formerly the French storeship and prison ship Bienvenue, captured by the British in 1794 and sold in 1795.
- HMS Undaunted was previously HMS Arethusa, a 38-gun fifth rate captured from the French in 1793. She was renamed HMS Undaunted in 1795 and was wrecked in 1796.
- HMS Undaunted (1799) was a schuyt captured from the Dutch in 1799 by HMS Pylades, turned into a temporary gunvessel, and sold in 1800.
- HMS Undaunted (1807) was a 38-gun fifth rate launched in 1807, used as a target from 1856 and broken up by 1860.
- HMS Undaunted (1861) was a wood screw frigate launched in 1861 and sold in 1882.
- HMS Undaunted (1886) was an Orlando-class cruiser launched in 1886 and broken up in 1907.
- HMS Undaunted (1914) was an Arethusa-class light cruiser launched in 1914 and scrapped in 1923.
- HMS Undaunted (N55) was U-class submarine launched in 1940 and sunk in 1941.
- HMS Undaunted (R53) was a U-class destroyer launched in 1943, converted into an anti-submarine frigate between 1952 and 1954, and sunk as a target in 1978.

== See also ==
- USS Undaunted
