= Montgreenan =

Manor house in North Ayrshire, Scotland

Coordinates: 55°40′21.6″N 4°38′14.5″W

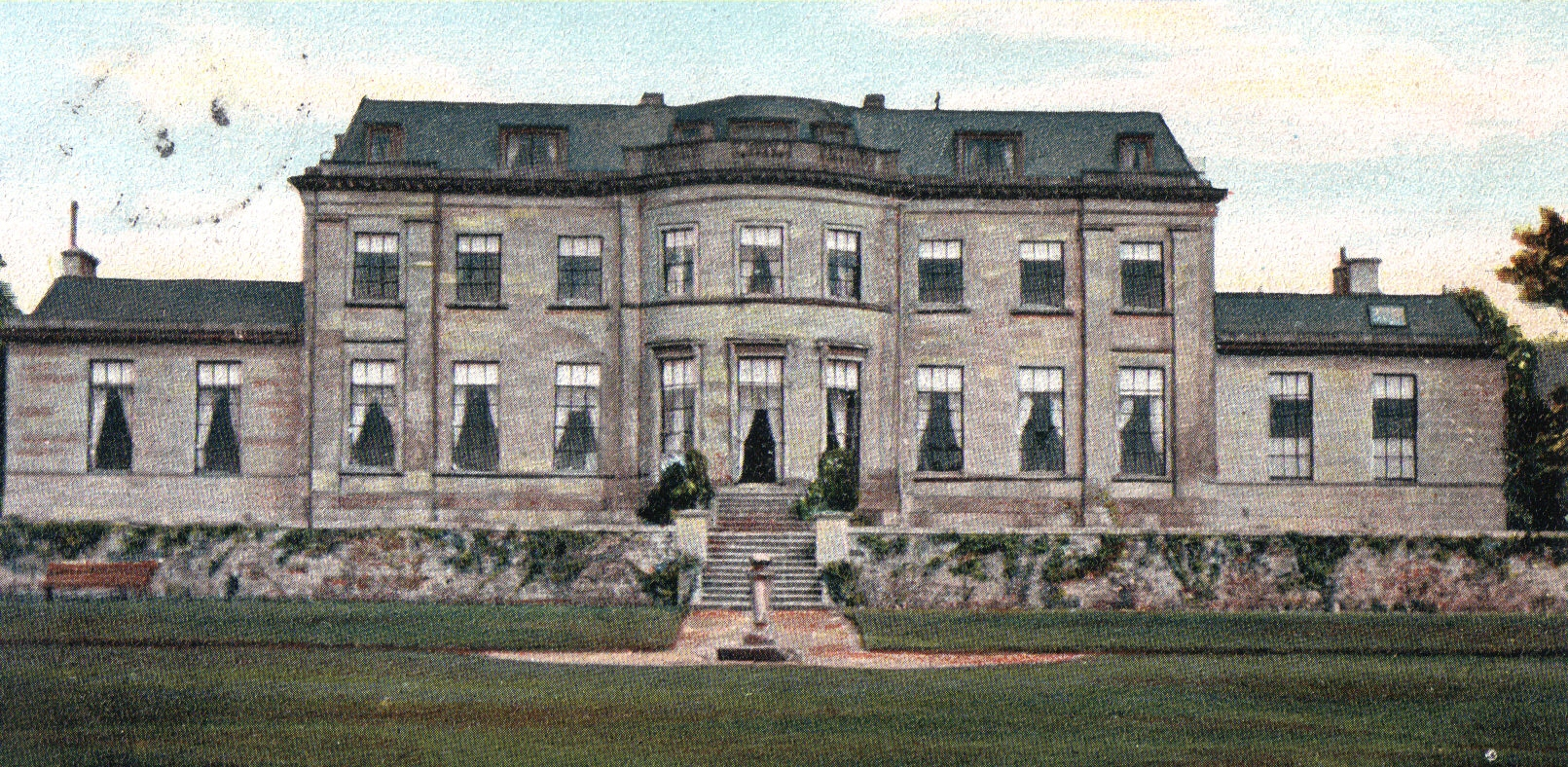
- Montgreenan House

- Location within North Ayrshire Location within East Ayrshire

Listed Building – Category A
- Designated: 14 April 1971
- Reference no.: LB7577

Montgreenan is an estate in North Ayrshire, Parish of Kilwinning, Scotland. The Lugton Water runs through the policies and farmland of Montgreenan. Nearby are the hamlets of Torranyard and Auchentiber.

== The Lands of Montgreenan ==
Location of the Lands of Montgreenan, Kilwinning, North Ayrshire

The name 'Grenane' is recorded in 1480, however the first detailed reference to Montgreenan is contained in the description of the ancient county of Cuninghame by Timothy Pont in the period 1604–1608. In it he describes 'Mongrynen Castle' as "…ane old strong Dunijon veil and pleasantly planted ye inheritance of Cuninghame Laird thereof sone to the abott of Kilwinin quho wes brother to James Earle of Glencairne". The 10 merk land of Montgreenan was held in the 15th century by the Ross family, who had many lands in Ayrshire, such as those of Dunlop and its castle. The Rosses held their lands as vassals of the De Morvilles.

Etymology
Montgreenan means 'Mound of the Sun' / 'Sunny Mound'. or 'Hill of the Hall or Palace.'

Following the murder of James III of Scotland, Sir John Ross de Montgreenan lost all his lands, only to rapidly return to royal favour under the rule of James IV and regain the Manor or Barony of Montgreenan. The manor or barony is said to have passed to the Monastery of Kilwinning and then to Alexander Cunninghame and his wife Jean Blair in 1582 – 83 following the reformation, of which, Alexander had been a prominent supporter. Alexander Cunninghame, the Commendator of Kilwinning Abbey, was shot and killed at his gate at Montgreenan by Sir Robert Montgomerie of Skelmorlie (better known for building the Skelmorlie Aisle as his burial place) on 1 August 1586, as a direct result of the assassination of Hugh Montgomerie, 4th Earl of Eglinton at Stewarton in April of that year. Lady Jean Cunninghame died in 1621, leaving the lands to her son William, and by 1632 Alexander Cunninghame, a grandson of Lady Jean was the owner, succeeded by his son Thomas in 1656. Thomas's son, of the same name, fought at the Battle of Bothwell Bridge and was sentenced to death for his actions. His life was spared, however his lands were forfeited and given to Lieutenant-General Douglas who sold it on to High Stevenson, clerk to the Privy Council. In 1691 the Hearth Tax records show the mansion house with seven and five other dwellings associated with the 'Lands of Montgreenan'.

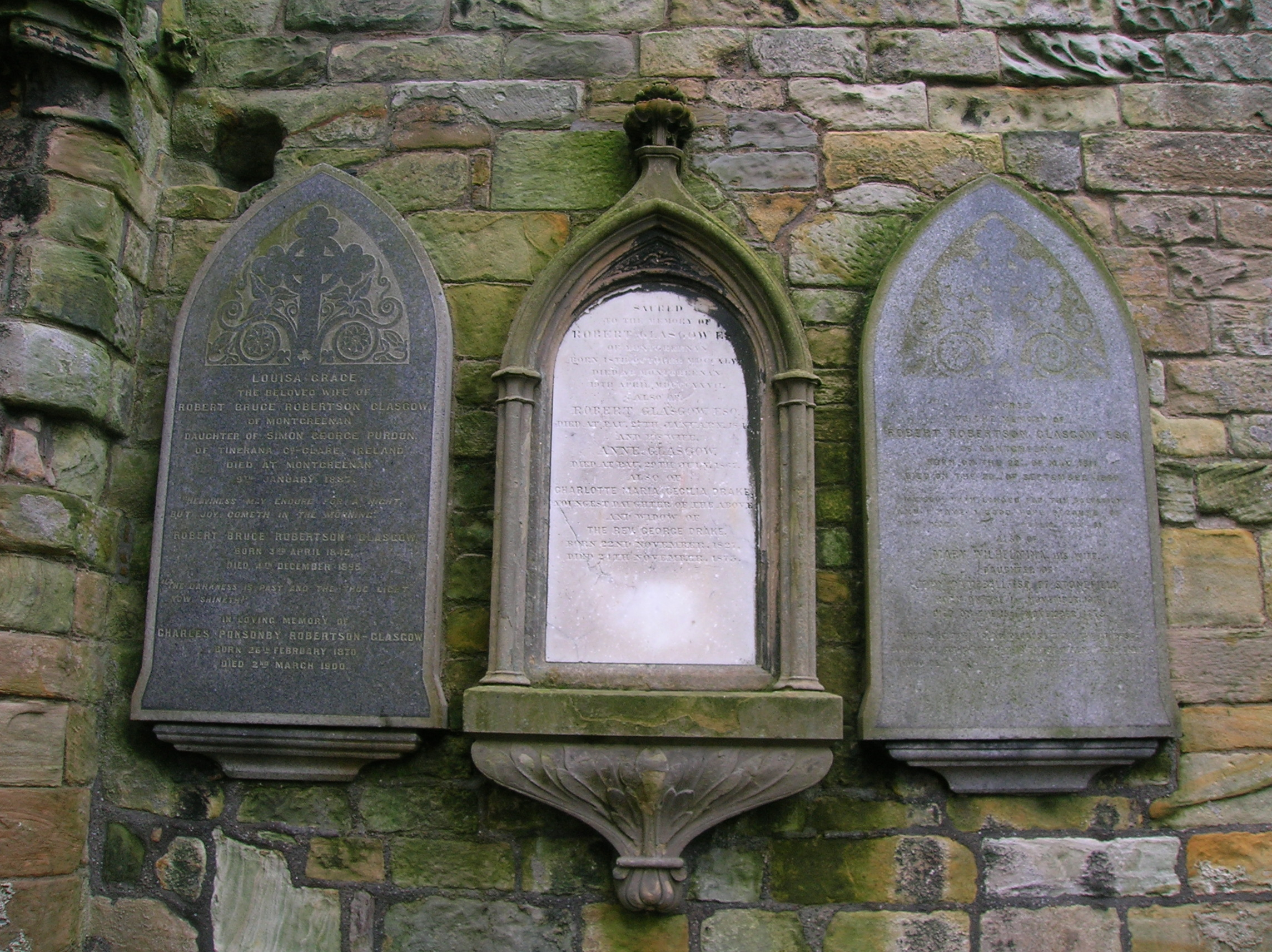
The Glasgow family memorials at Kilwinning Abbey.

The estate remained with the Stevensons until 1778, when they sold it to John Bowman of Ashinyards, who in turn sold it to Dr. Robert Glasgow. The doctor married a daughter, Rachel, of John Dunlop of that Ilk, but they had no offspring; he died in 1827. The funeral was famous for the generosity shown to 616 poor people of the parish.

Mrs. Rachel Glasgow was an artist and an author with great literary taste and she died at Pau, in the Pyrenees, on 19 July 1828. She is mentioned by Robert Burns in relation to a painting or sketch she made of Coila, the poet's muse. Mrs Glasgow was commemorated by the erection of a well in Kilwinning's Howgate; she had given £200 to the poor of the town. Robert Robertson of Prenderguest, a son-in-law, inherited the estate, changing his surname to 'Glasgow'. Robert Robertson Glasgow, his son, inherited in 1845 and in 1860 his son, Robert Bruce Robertson Glasgow inherited Montgreenan in his turn. In 1873 R. B. Robertson-Glasgow was Lieutenant-Colonel commanding the 1st Volunteer Battalion, Royal Scots Fusiliers and in 1896, R. P. Robertson-Glasgow was likewise Lieutenant-Colonel commanding the 2nd Volunteer Battalion, Royal Scots Fusiliers.

Sir James Bell, shipowner and former Lord Provost of Glasgow bought the estate in 1895. He was Chairman of the G&SWR from 1915 to 1920. He died at Montgreenan in 1929.

=== The Castle or Bishop's Palace ===
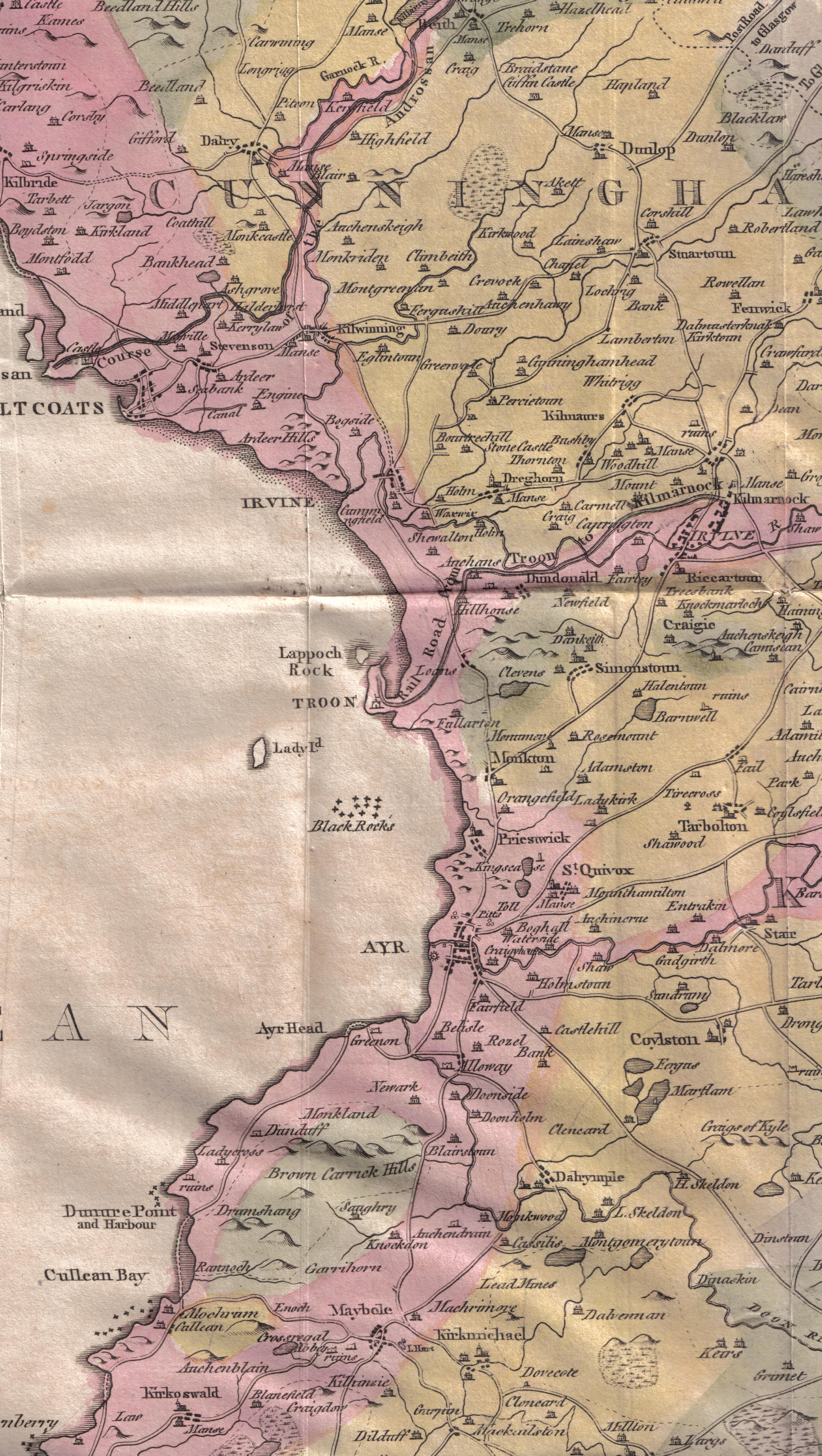
William Aiton's 1811 map showing Montgreenan.

The ruins of the old Montgreenan Castle or Bishop's Palace lie in a loop of the Lugton Water at its confluence with the Cowlinn Burn. The name Dunach Brae for the strip of woodlands nearby, suggests that a hill fort or 'Dun' may have been in the vicinity at a much earlier date. Alexander Cunninghame, the Commendator of Kilwinning Abbey, was shot at his gate at Montgreenan by Sir Robert Montgomerie of Skelmorlie (better known for building the Skelmorlie Aisle as his burial place) on 1 August 1586, as a direct result of the assassination of the Fourth Earl of Eglinton at Stewarton in April of that year.

John Smith in 1895 recorded that in the Montgreenan Woods are the remains of a Bishop's Palace, sometimes called a castle, of which little appears to be known. Not far away is part of an ancient gateway, and just South of the house there are the remains of a mound which once contained an ice-house. All that remains at this site is a small piece of wall at the side of the stream, and a slight hollow, partly surrounded by a bank formed by the rubbish of the old walls. Mr R. Glasgow, the proprietor, stated in the 1856 Name Book of the Ordnance Survey that the dwelling probably became disused in 1680, when the last Cunninghame of Montgreenan was forfeited. Much of its remains were removed about 1765 by the previous proprietor, Mr Stevenson, to build a house at Kilwinning.

A visit in 1956 recorded that in the thick vegetation were traces of buildings, enclosed by a wall on the West and South sides. The details were unclear, but the castle plan seemed to be that of a courtyard with internal buildings on all sides except perhaps the East, where there is a wall running along the edge of the Lugton Water. Such a building design with a central courtyard was called a 'Place' or 'Palace' due to its construction, not its size. All the walls were merely heaps of rubble, and the drystone "courtyard" wall seemed to be of later construction than the internal remains, acting as a revetment to the mass of rubble inside. This wall was 1.4m high. No clear evidence was encountered for this being a "Bishop's Palace". About 65.0m to the South was a mound, 1.5m high, which had been cut through by a track, and may be the ice-house referred to by Smith, although no stone-work exists. No trace of a gateway was found, although the possible entrance shown on OS plan may be the gateway referred to.

=== Views of Montgreenan Castle or Bishop's Palace in 2007 ===
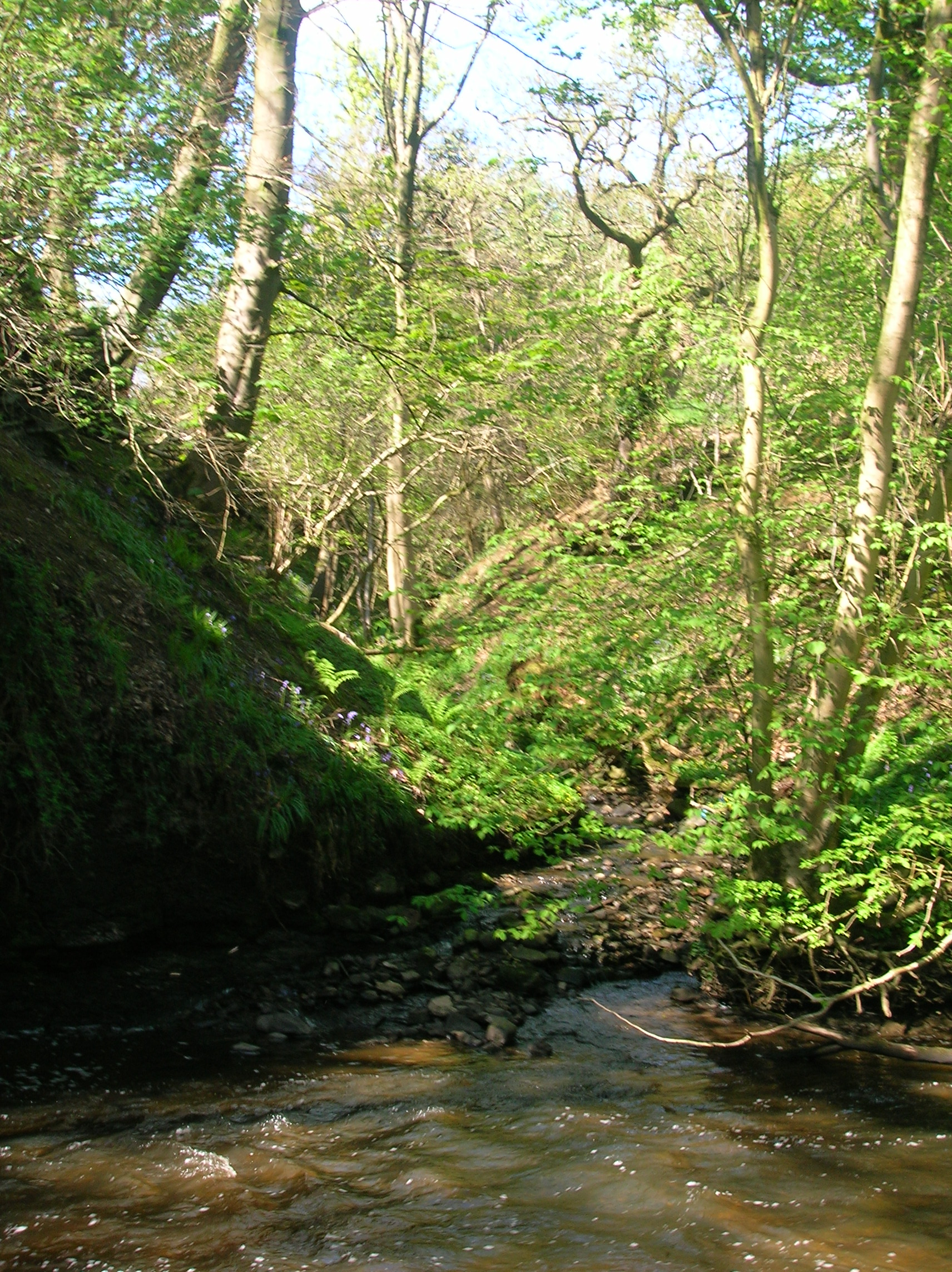
The Cowlinn Burn from Clonbeith joining the Lugton Water at Montgreenan Castle.

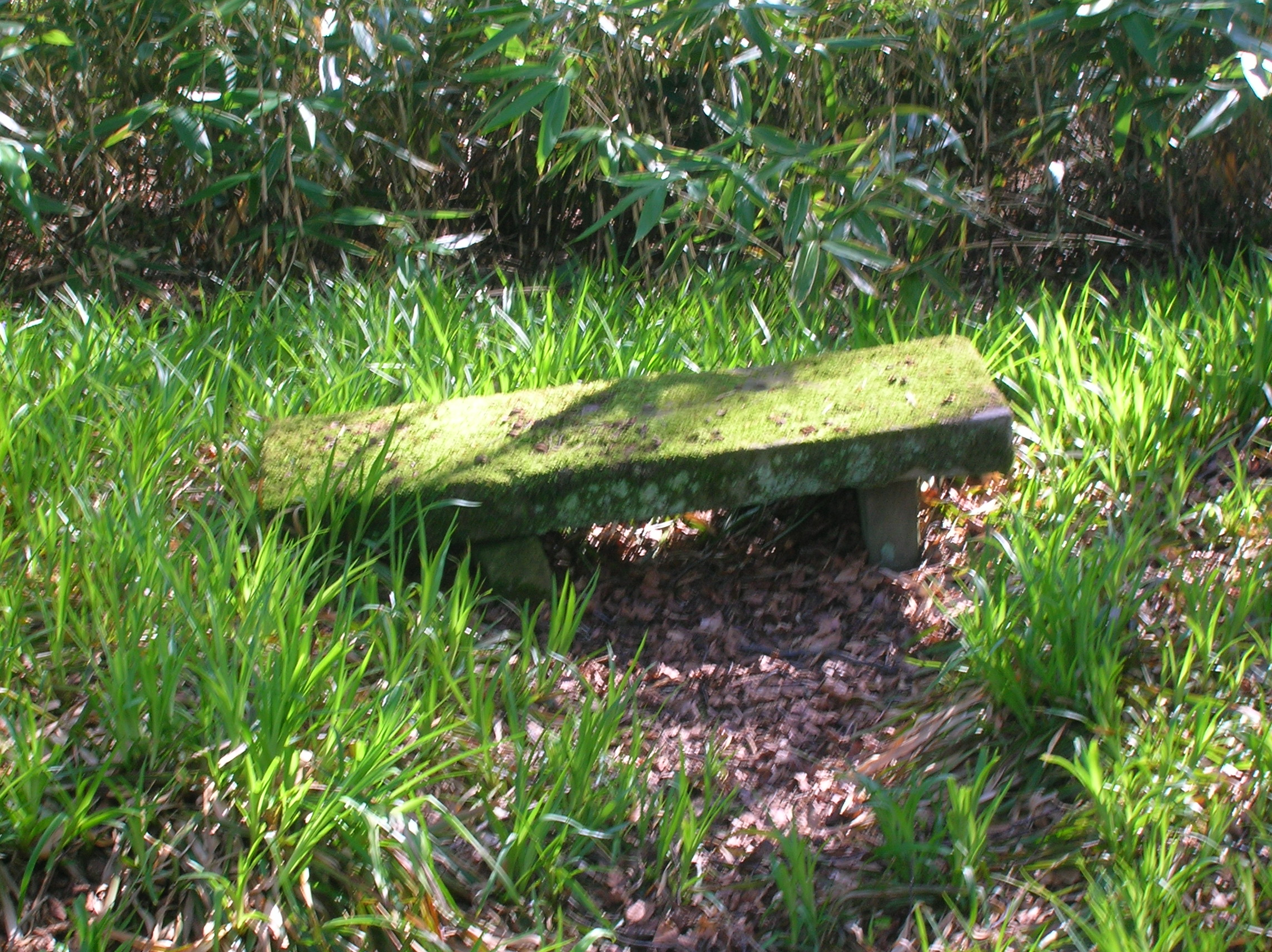
A seat near the old castle at an old entrance gate.

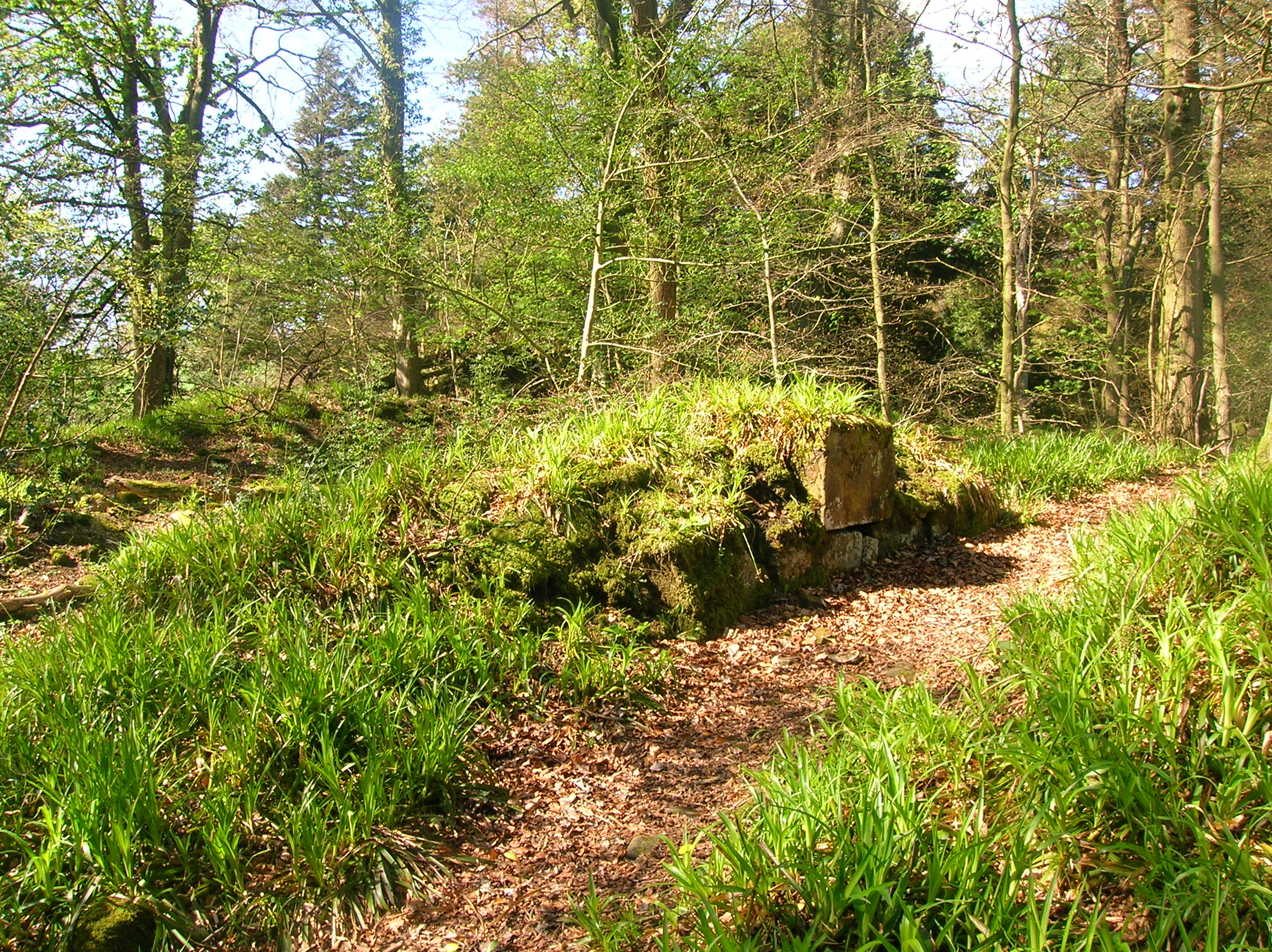
A possible entrance way into the old castle.

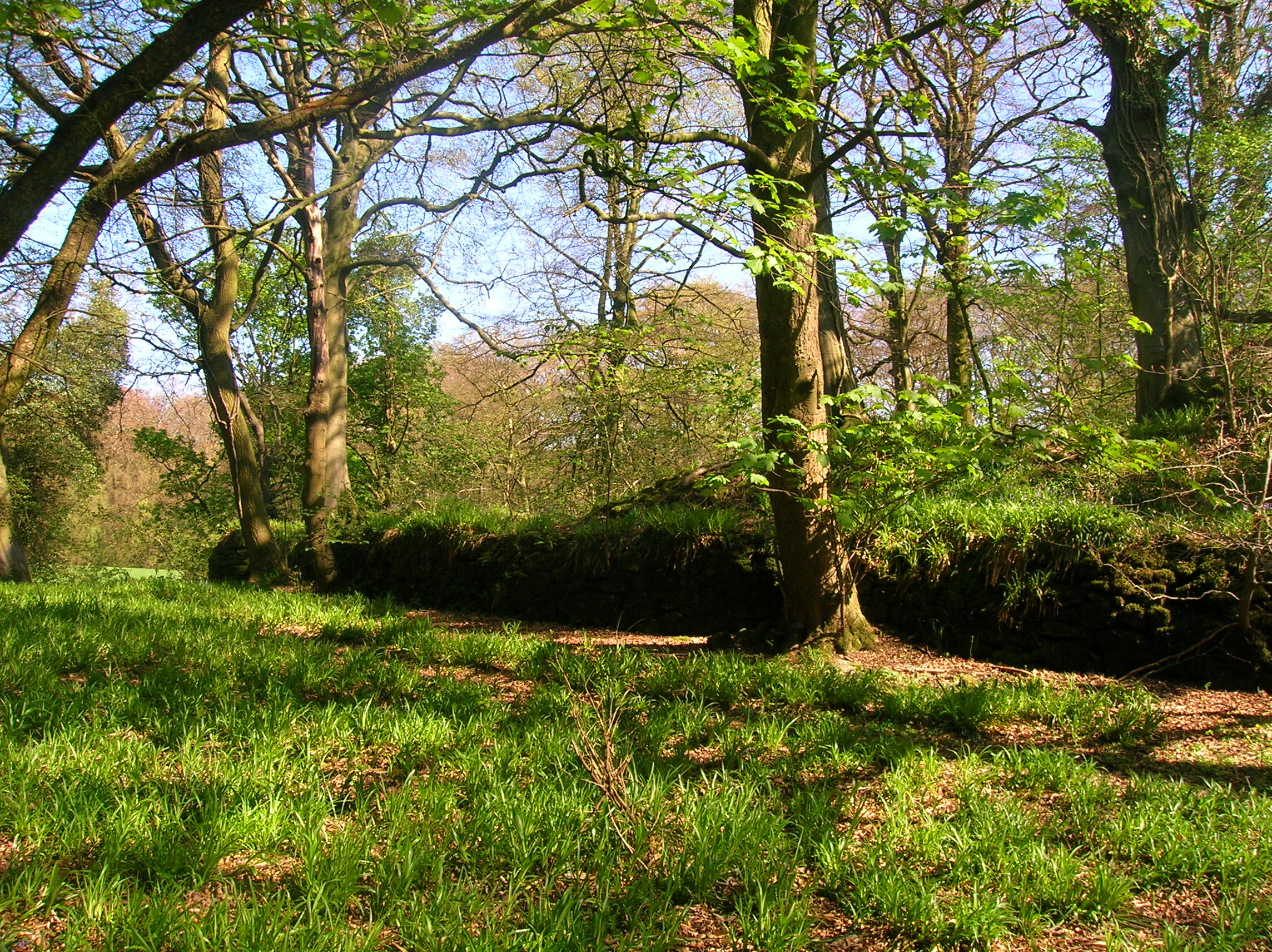
Possibly Victorian walling around the outside of the old castle.

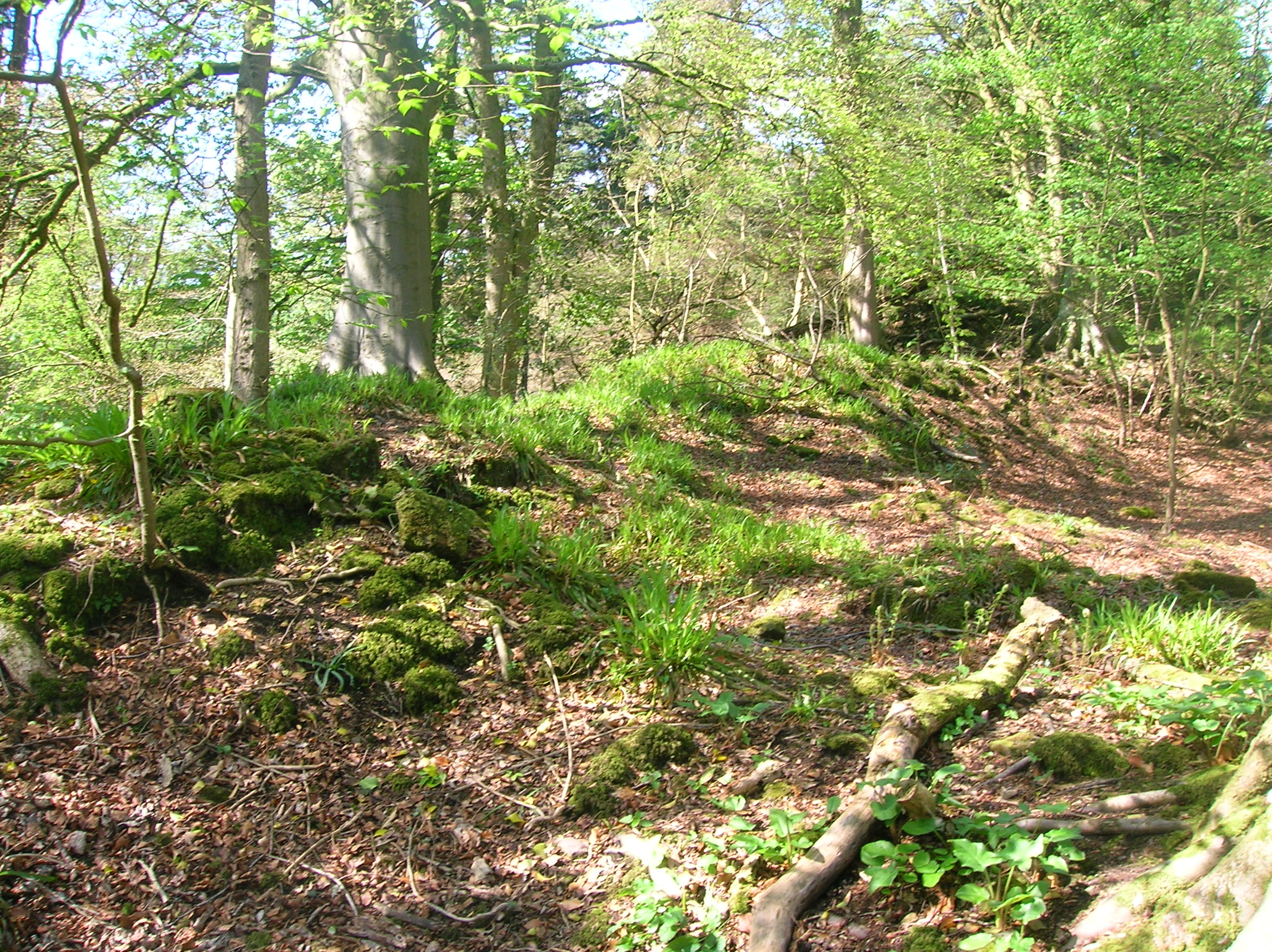
An inside view of the old castle.

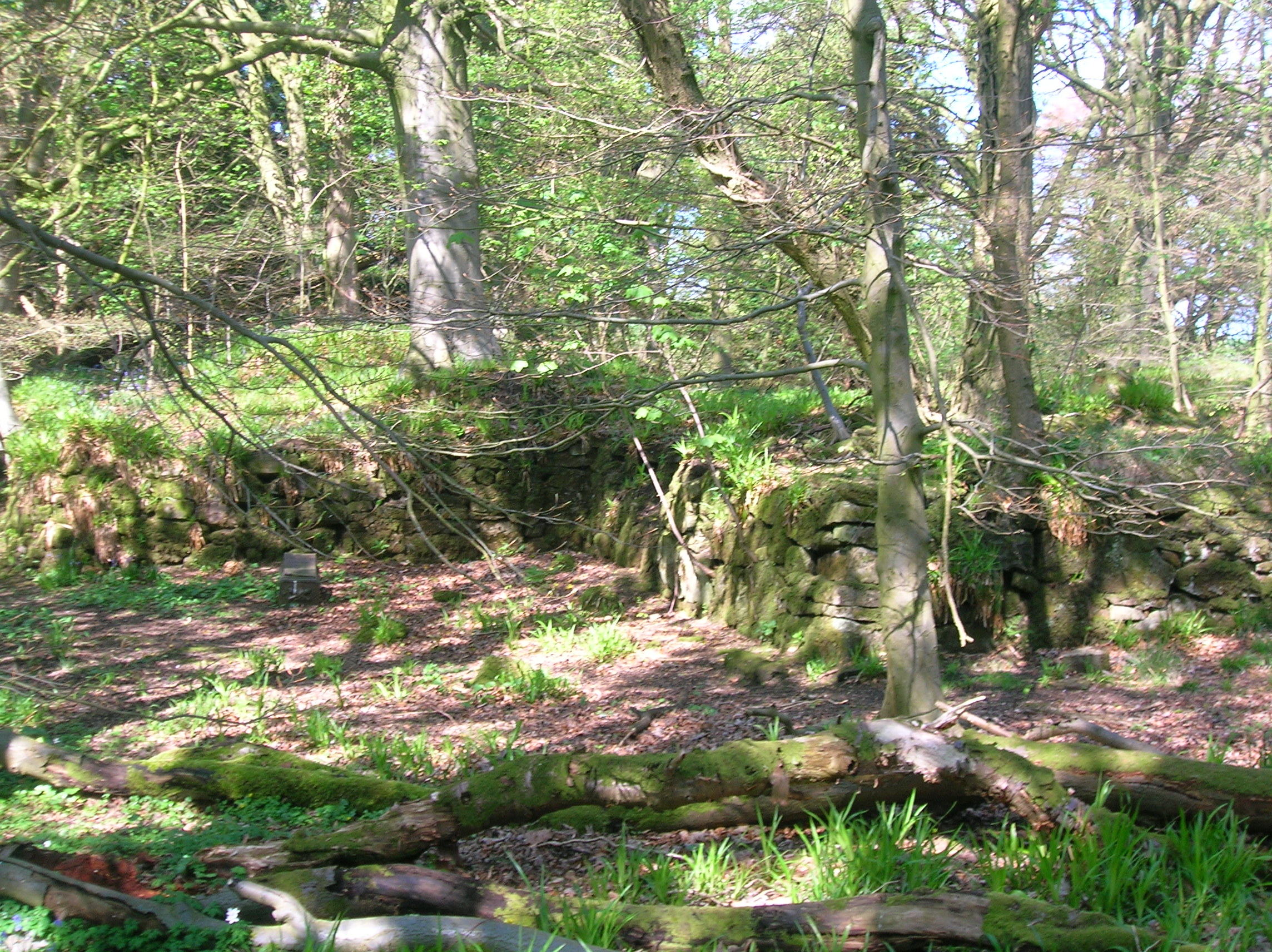
A view of the outside wall of the old castle.

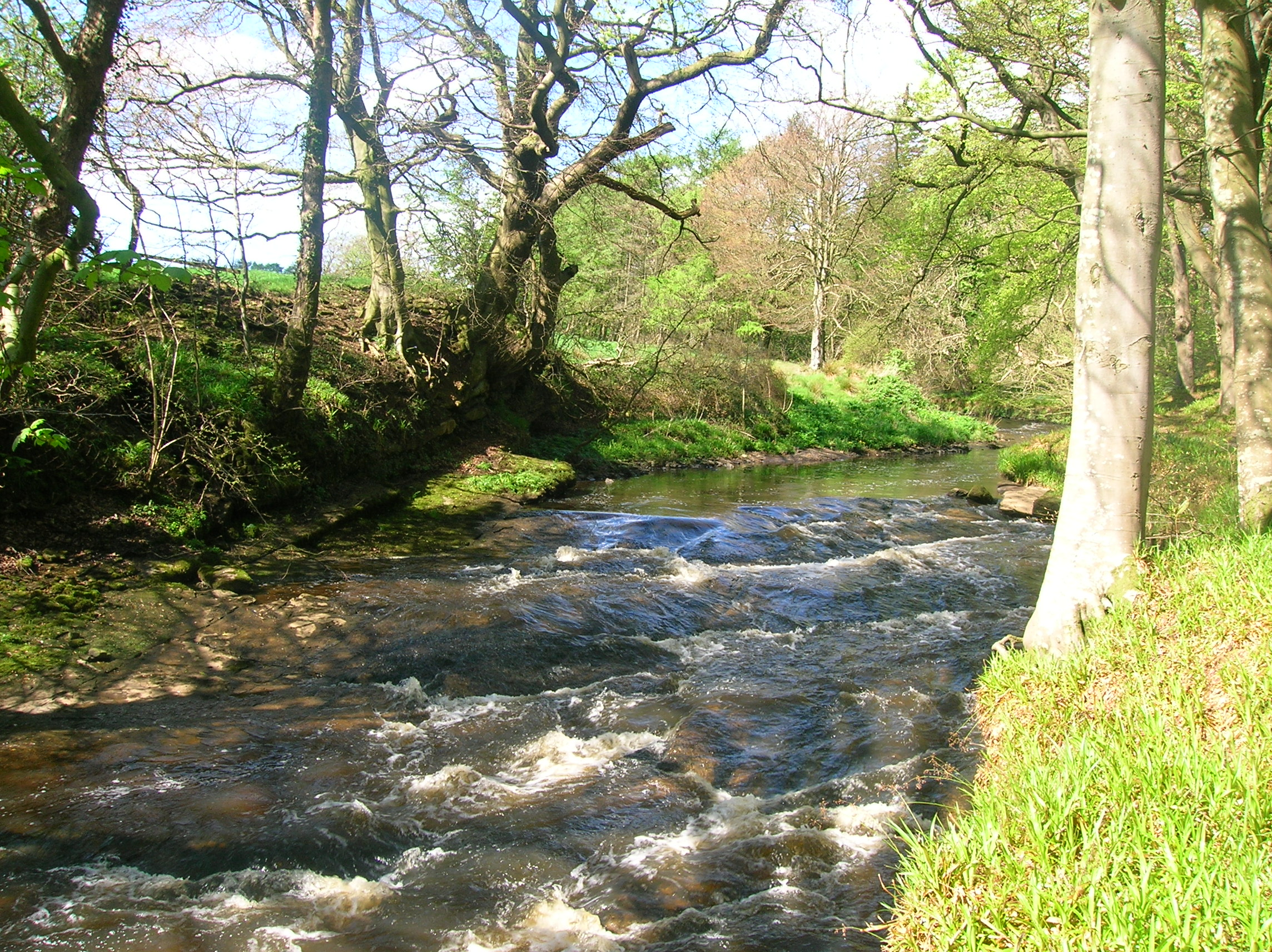
A dike on the Lugton Water near old Montgreenan castle.

=== The Mansion House and estate ===
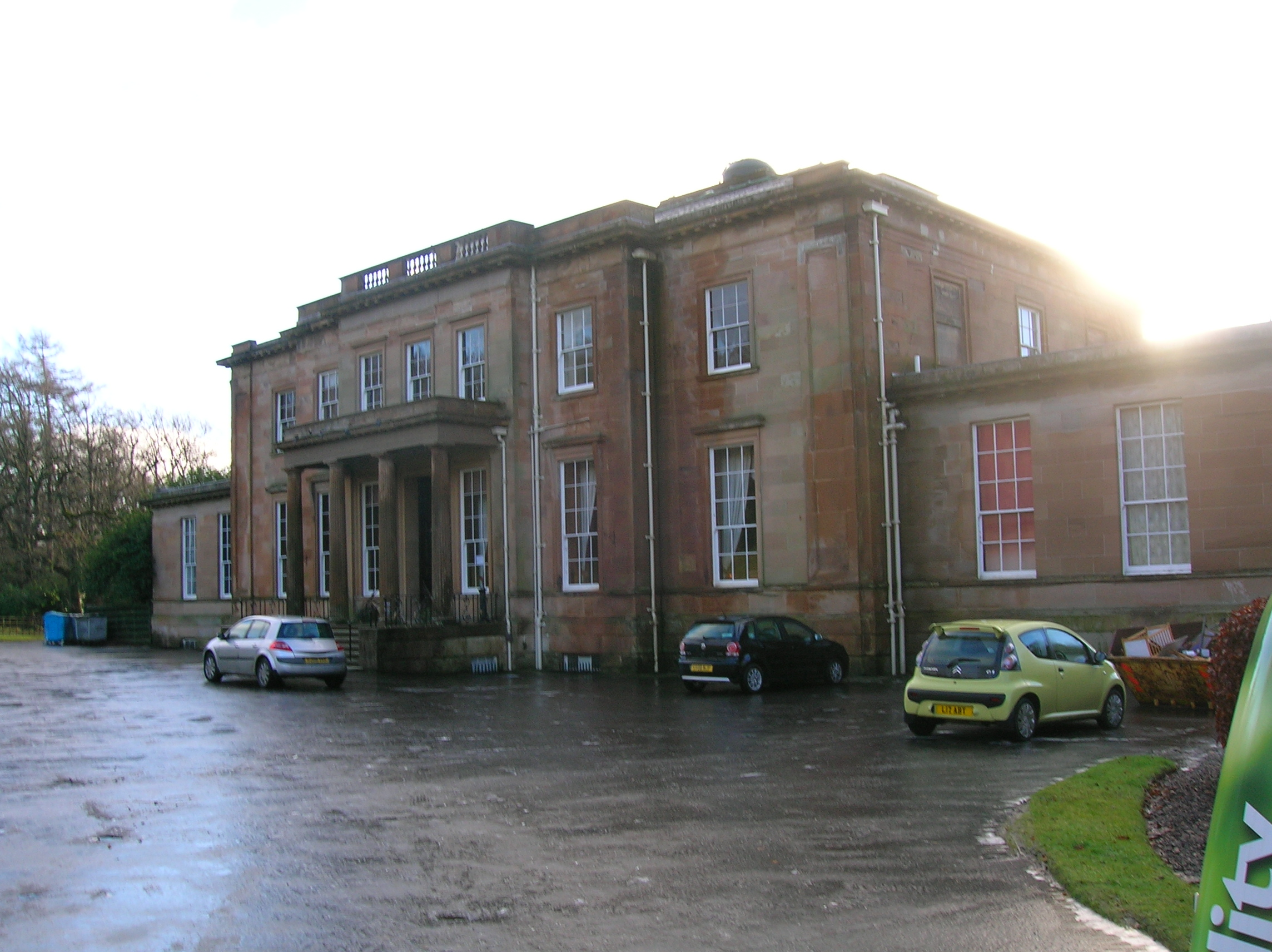
Montgreenan Mansion house.

Location of the Lands of Montgreenan, Kilwinning, North Ayrshire

The present Georgian mansion with architectural features by Alexander 'Greek' Thompson was built by Sir Robert Glasgow in 1817. Sir Robert, in common with other entrepreneurs from the Glasgow area, made his fortune through a shipping company based in St Vincent in the West Indies, undoubtedly trading between Britain, Africa and the sugar plantations of the West Indies. Montgreenan was the home of the Viscounts Weir until 1982, when it was sold and became a hotel. The building is Category A listed by Historic Scotland.

Alexander Craufurd of Fergushill inherited Fergushill from his father and it next passed by inheritance to the Kincaid family who alienated the lands to Neil Macvicar and his wife Elizabeth Montgomerie in 1728. The Macvicars retained the lands until 1802 when they were acquired by Robert Glasgow of Montgreenan. Archibald Stevenson acquired Montgreenan in 1755 and sold it to Mr. Bowman in 1778, a Provost of Glasgow and builder of Ashgrove House at Ashinyards near Kilwinning.

The estate had a curling pond, a fine stable block, offices, a mains farm and a walled garden. The buildings still survive as private dwellings (2008). Caven Mill is likely to have been the barony mill to which the tenants were thirled; this building is now a ruin.

=== Corporal John Smith ===
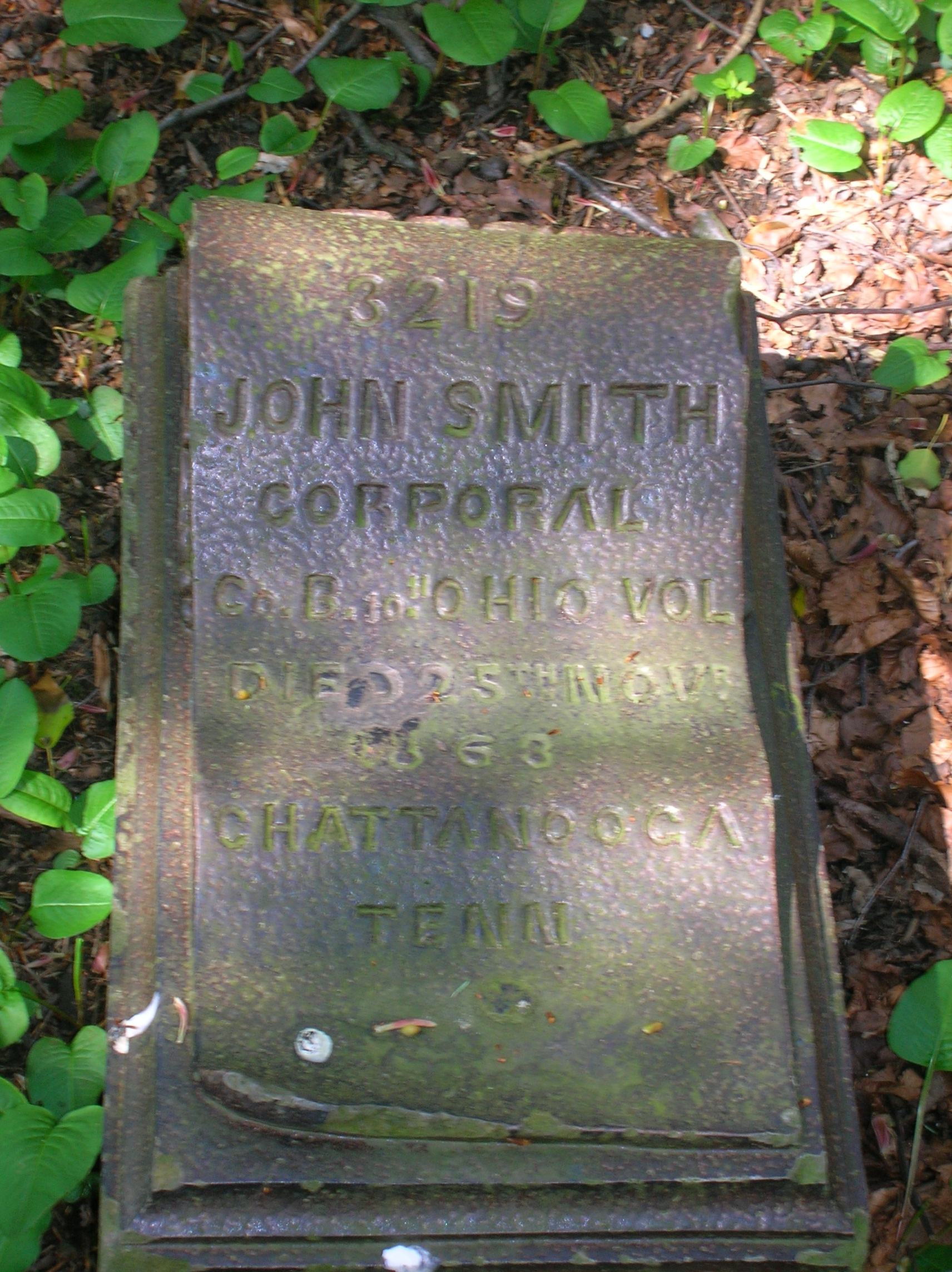
A memorial stone to Corporal John Smith at Montgreenan old castle.

An unusual memorial is located next to the ruins of the Bishop's Palace or Castle of Montgreenan. The memorial is formed from glazed fireclay much like that used for wall coping stones and pipes and has the appearance of a corbel laid horizontally. The oblong structure has crossed canons at one end and bunches of olive or laurel leaves at the other end. The scroll on the upper surface reads "3219 – John Smith – Corporal – Co. B. 10th Ohio Vol – Died 25th Novr – 1863 – Chattanooga – Tenn". It appears therefore that John died whilst fighting in the Chattanooga campaign of November 1863 and being in the Ohio Volunteers he was on the Union side and not a Confederate soldier. It can be surmised that John Smith had a close link with the Montgreenan estate.

=== The Montgreenan milestones ===
Beside the driveways running to the Montgreenan mansion house from the Lodges are a number of red sandstone pillars, these are milestones. They look like gatepost-like and were 'rescued' after they became redundant or 'in the way' as a result of road widening works, etc. They have been brought from various places in Ayrshire. Sir James Bell of Montgreenan had a hobby of collecting milestones and other stones. Many Ayrshire milestones were buried during the Second World War as an invasion precaution. Two are near the West Lodge and three of these milestones are near the East Lodge at Montgreenan Mains.

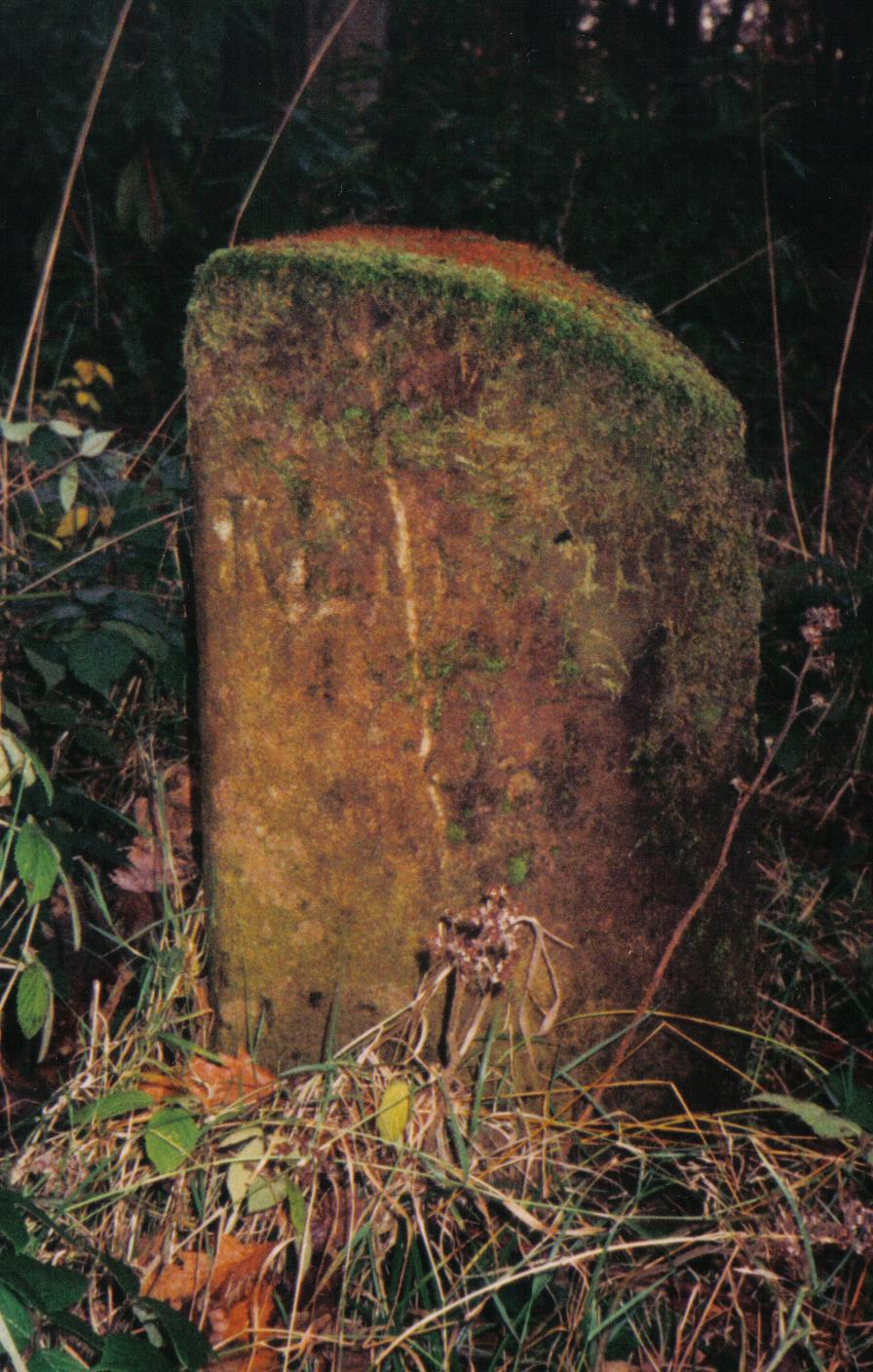
One of a pair of milestones re-erected at Montgreenan near the West lodge.

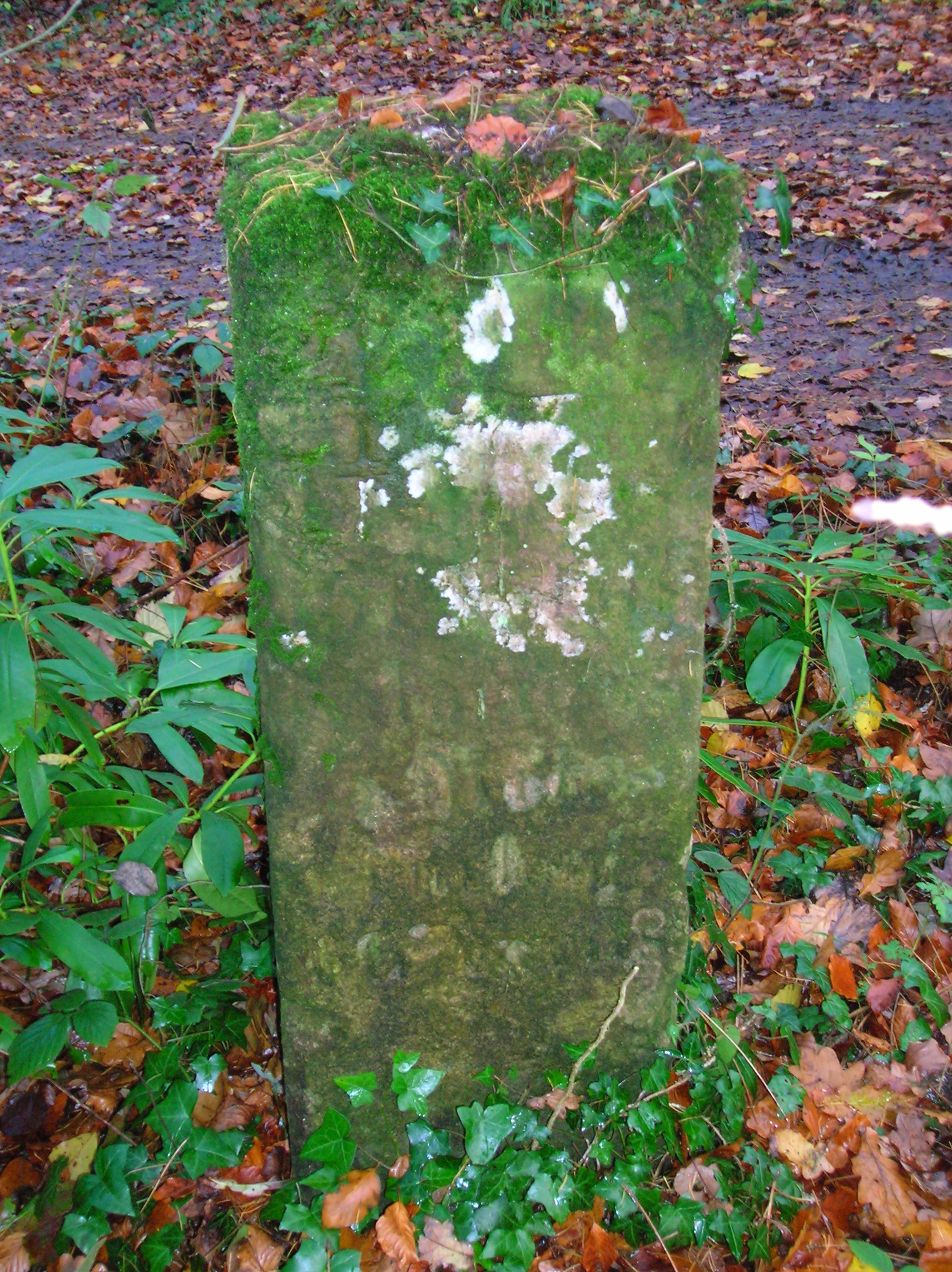
A milestone at the entrance to Montgreenan Mains.

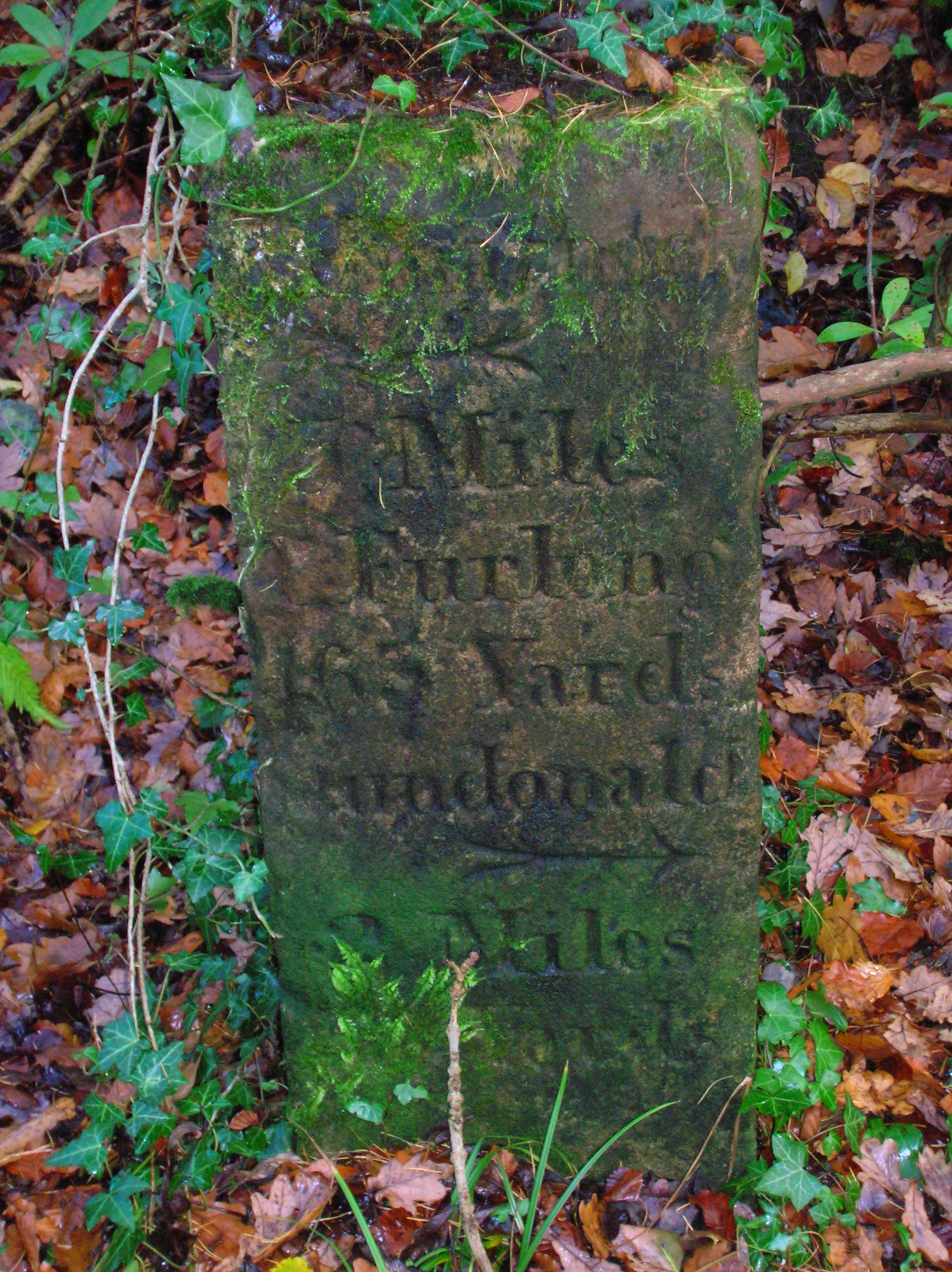
A Kilmarnock to Dundonald milestone at the entrance to Montgreenan Mains.

=== The Montgreenan to Auchentiber carriageway ===
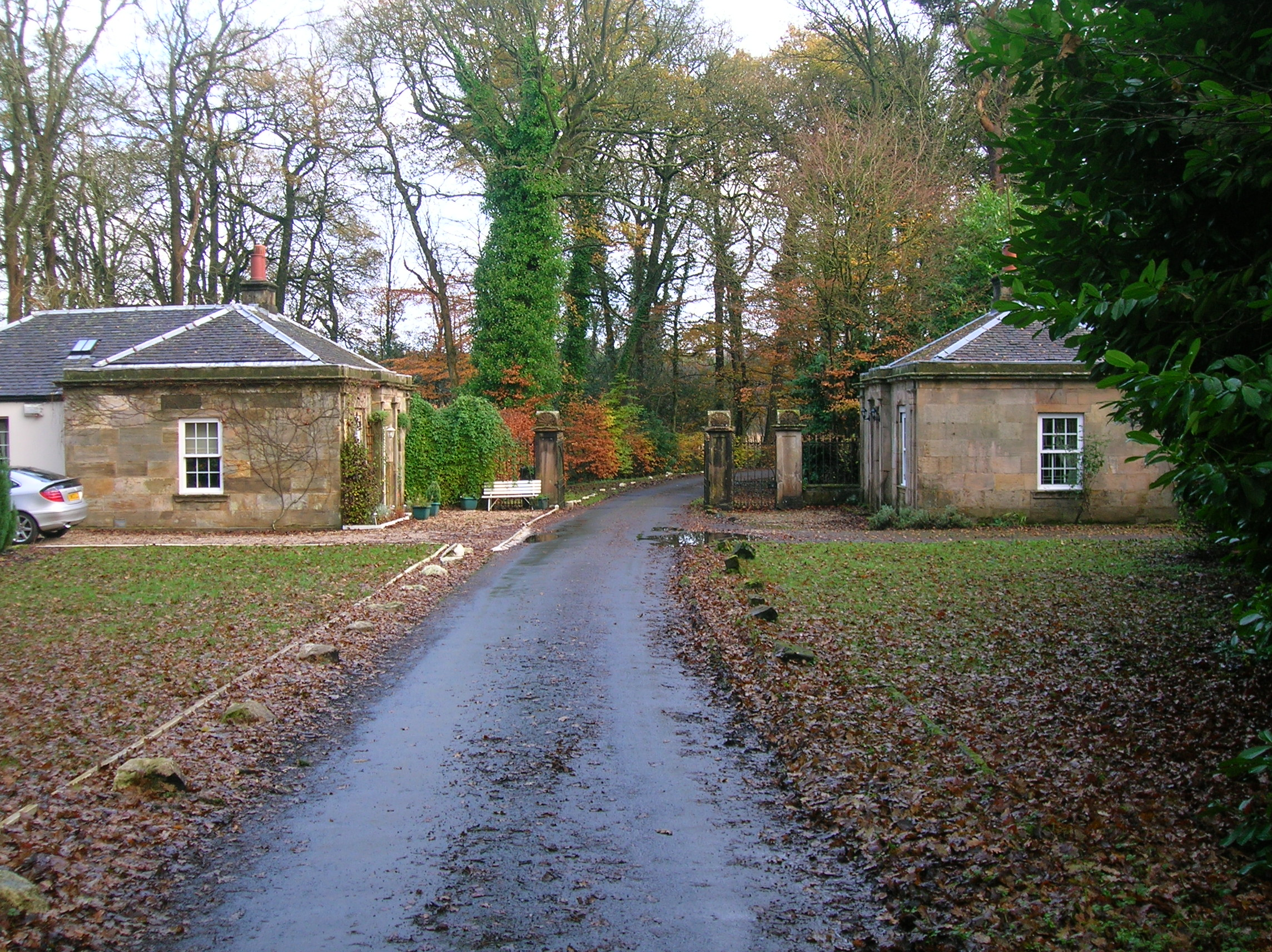
Montgreenan East Lodge.

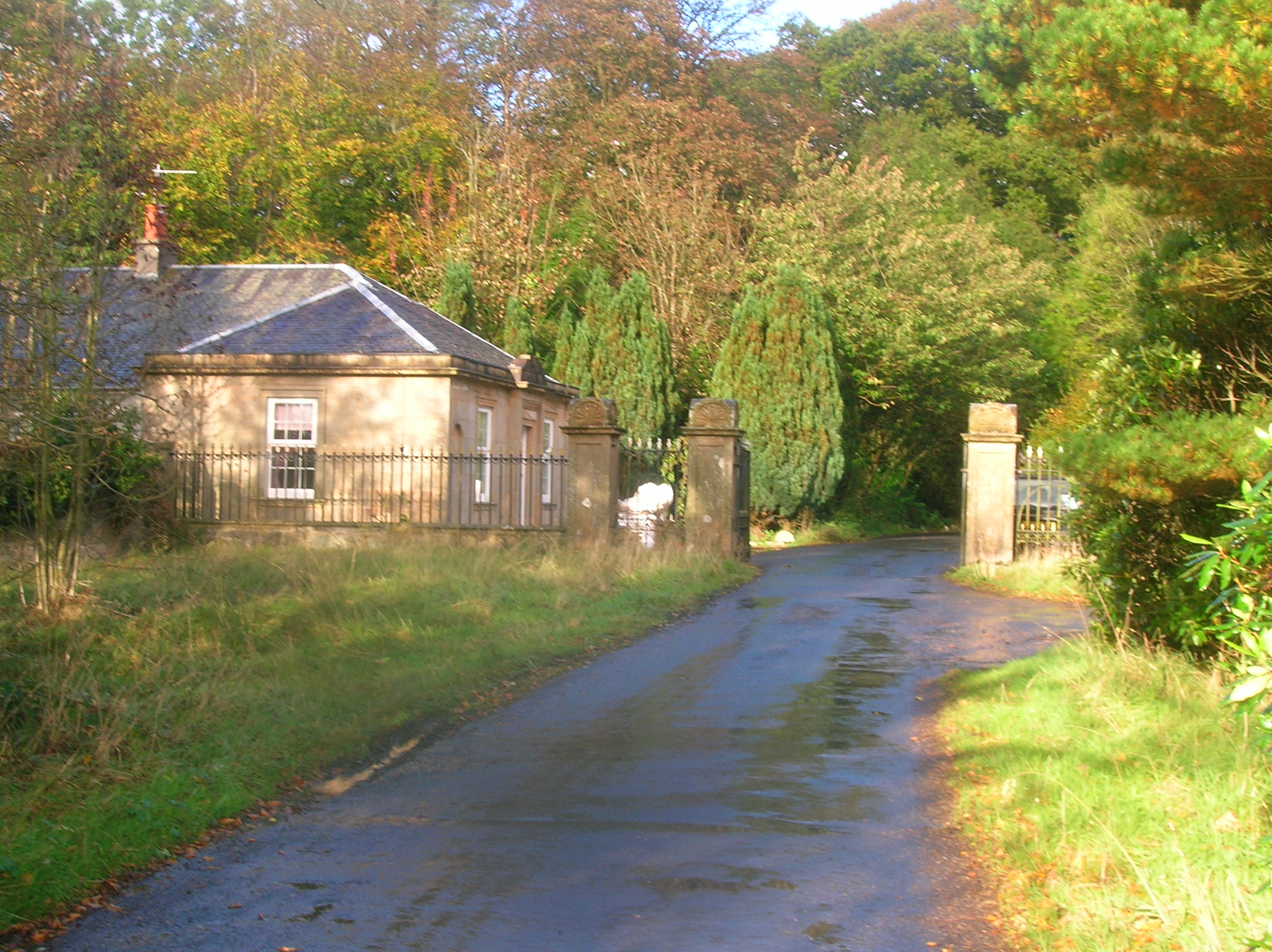
Montgreenan West Lodge.

The 1858 OS map shows a carriage or driveway running from close to the surviving Auchentiber schoolhouse on the Lochlibo road, passed the old Murchland farm site (Murghland in 1747; Murchen is the Scots for a hare) through the Montgreenan plantations, crossing the road near Cavan Mill and finally running on down to Montgreenan house. A track and later a road ran from Auchenharvie Castle across the Lochlibo toll road and up to Megswells (Meggs Walls in 1747), crossing the Lugton Water by stepping stones and later by a ford. This route ran under the aforementioned Montgreenan carriageway via a bridge which has an embankment leading up to it. The area near the old Mosside farm has been the site of several limestone quarries and limekilns in 1858 (OS), but by 1897 these had closed.

Mosside bridge is of a very high quality of workmanship and ornamentation. It has false windows, diamond / lozenge-shaped embellishments, a thistle on the keystones and raised random patterns and other designs which represent leaves.

The Ness Papers state that the false windows were for the insertion of a coat of arms and that the old coach road ran across this bridge on its way to Cavan Mill and beyond.

==== Views of the Mosside bridge and carriageway ====
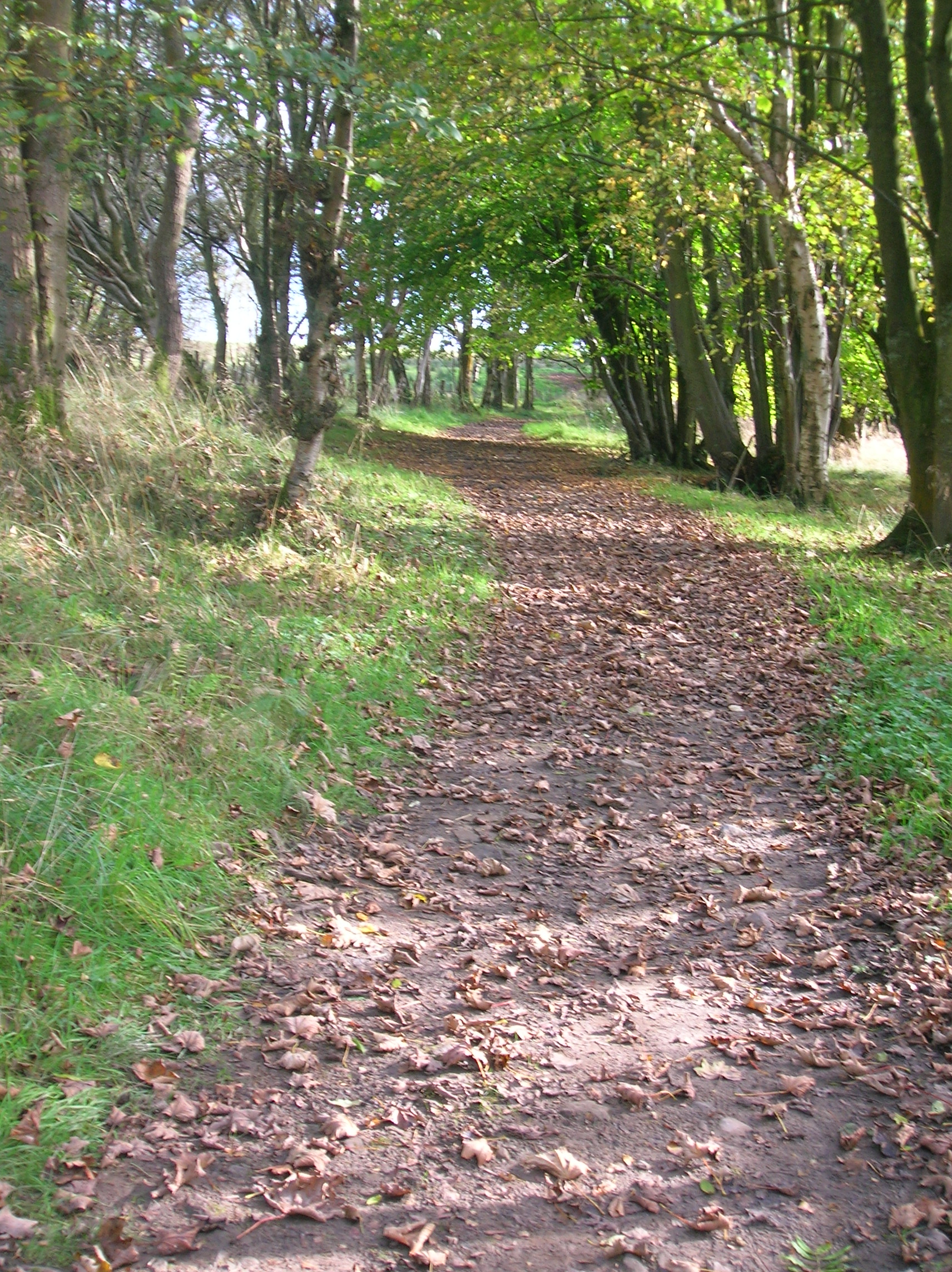
The old carriage looking towards Auchentiber.

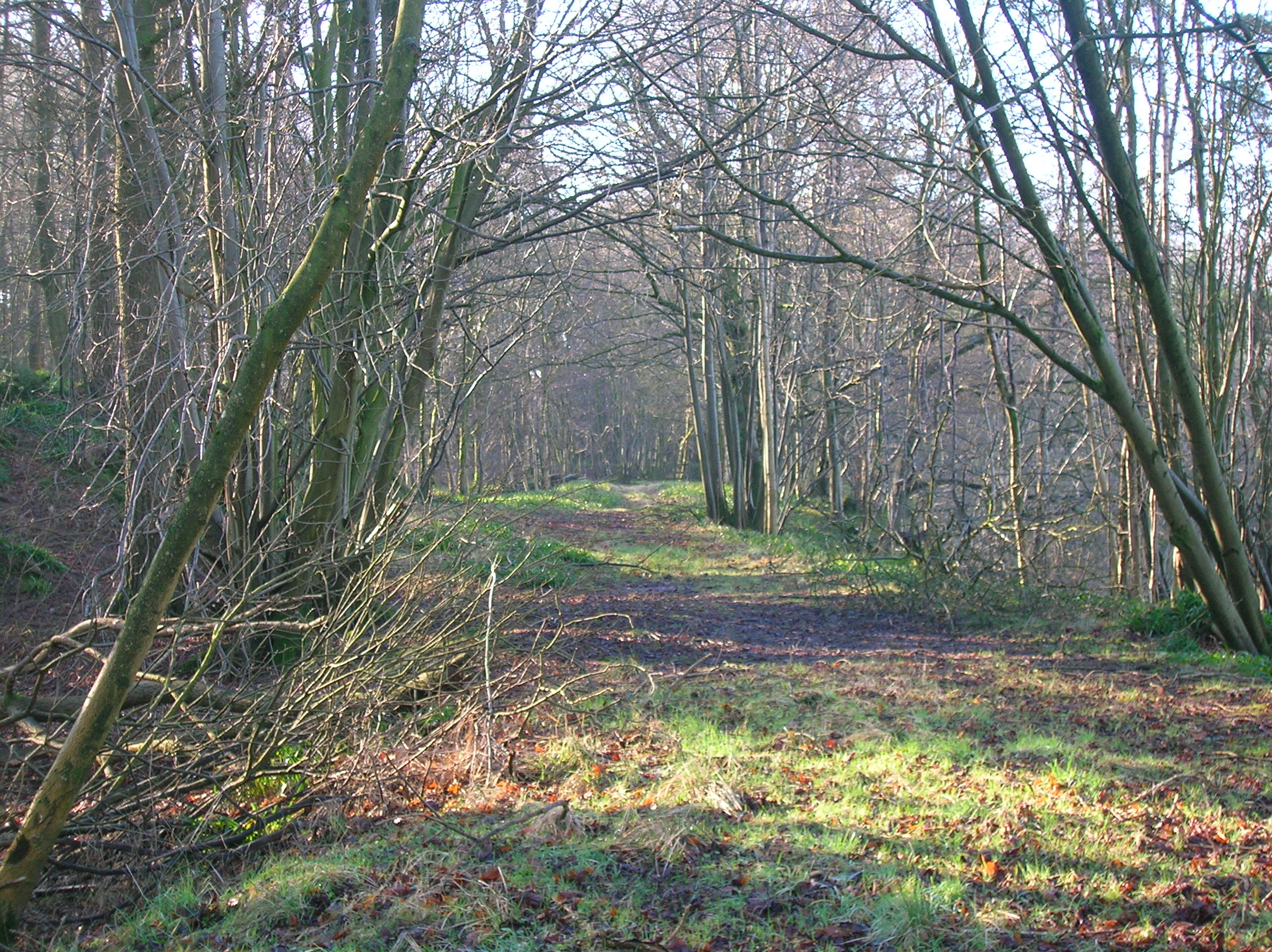
The old carriageway looking towards Caven Mill.

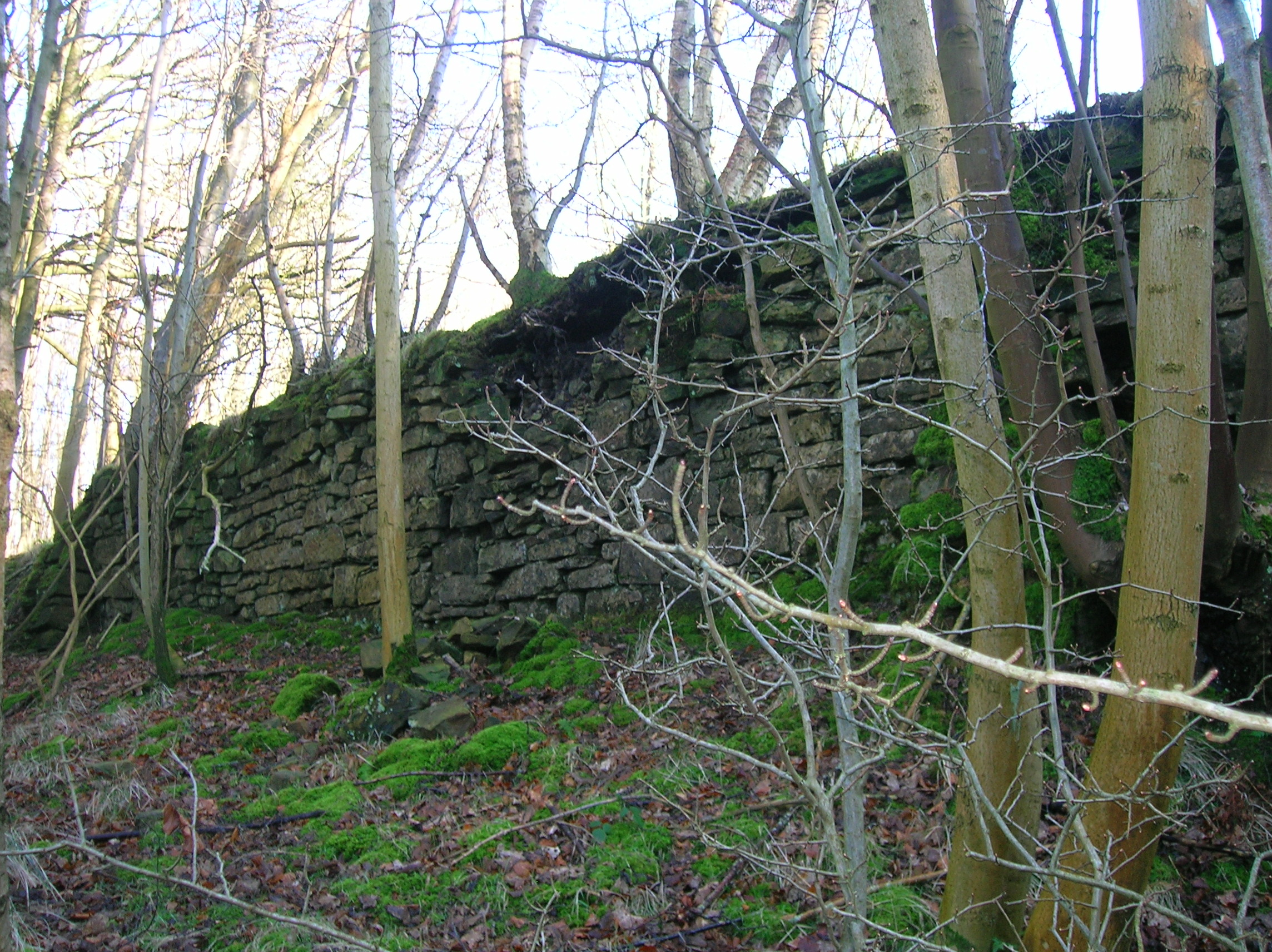
The retaining wall of the embankment.

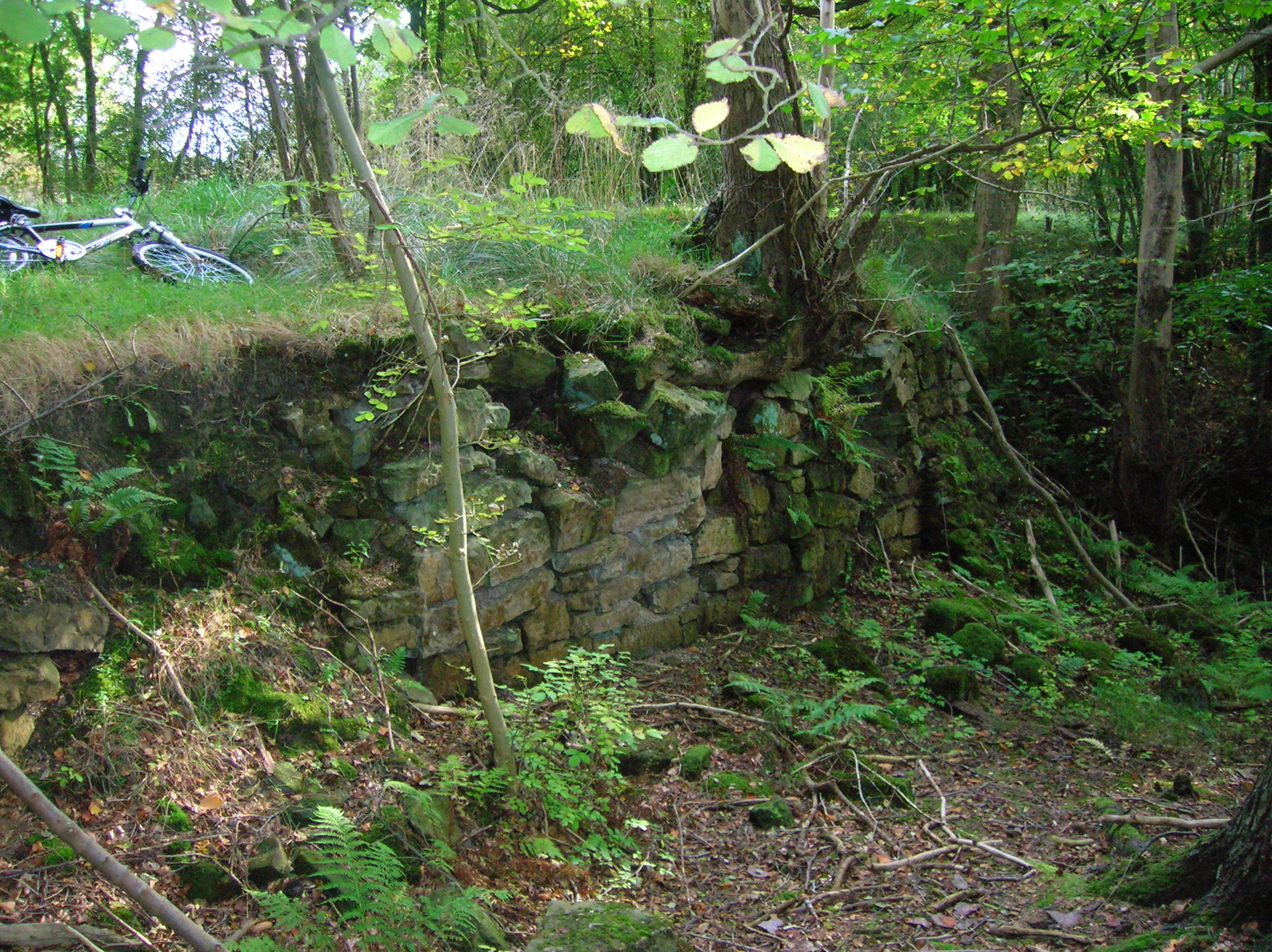
The embankment running up towards Mosside bridge.

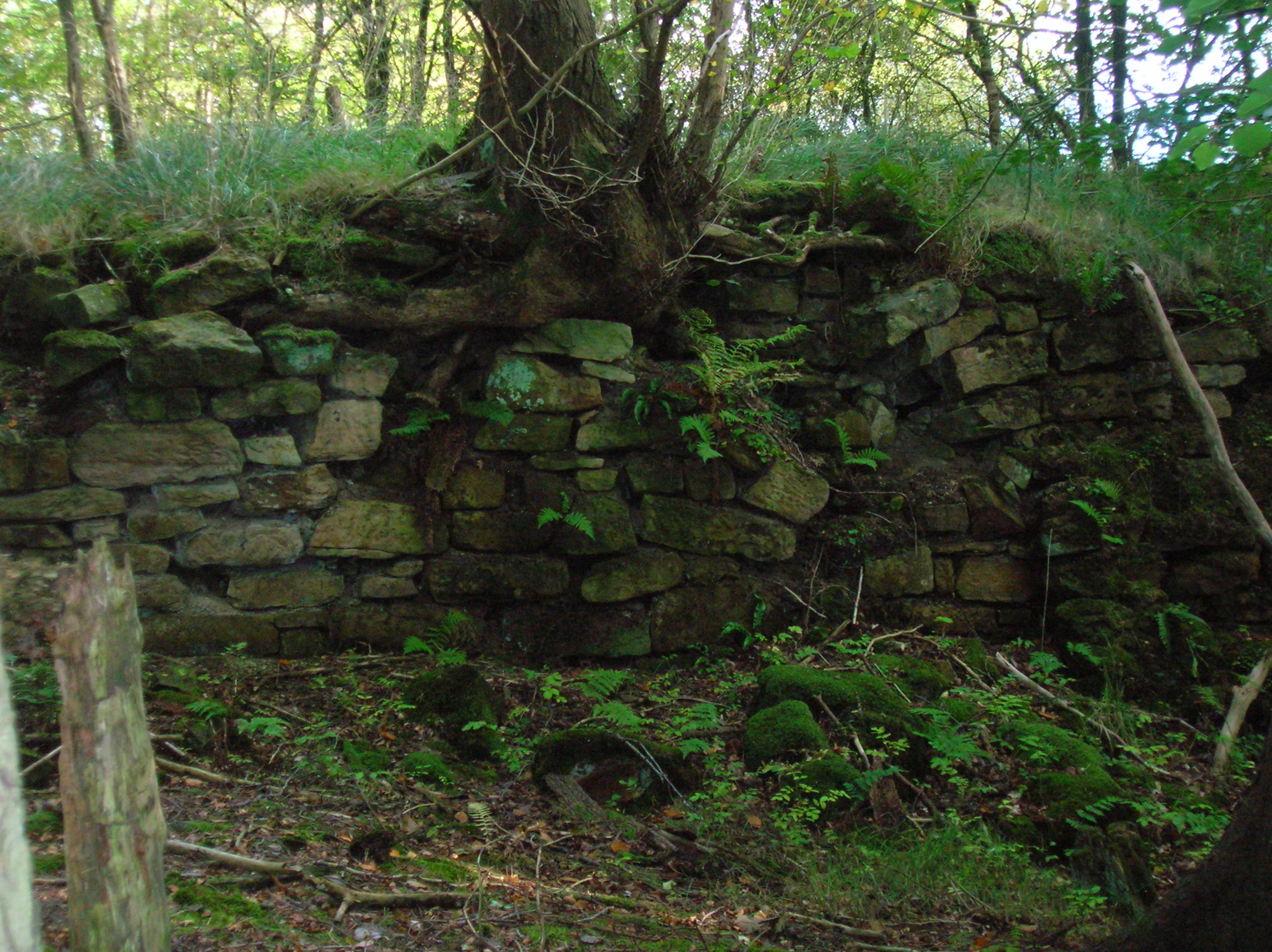
Detail of the stonework on the embankment.

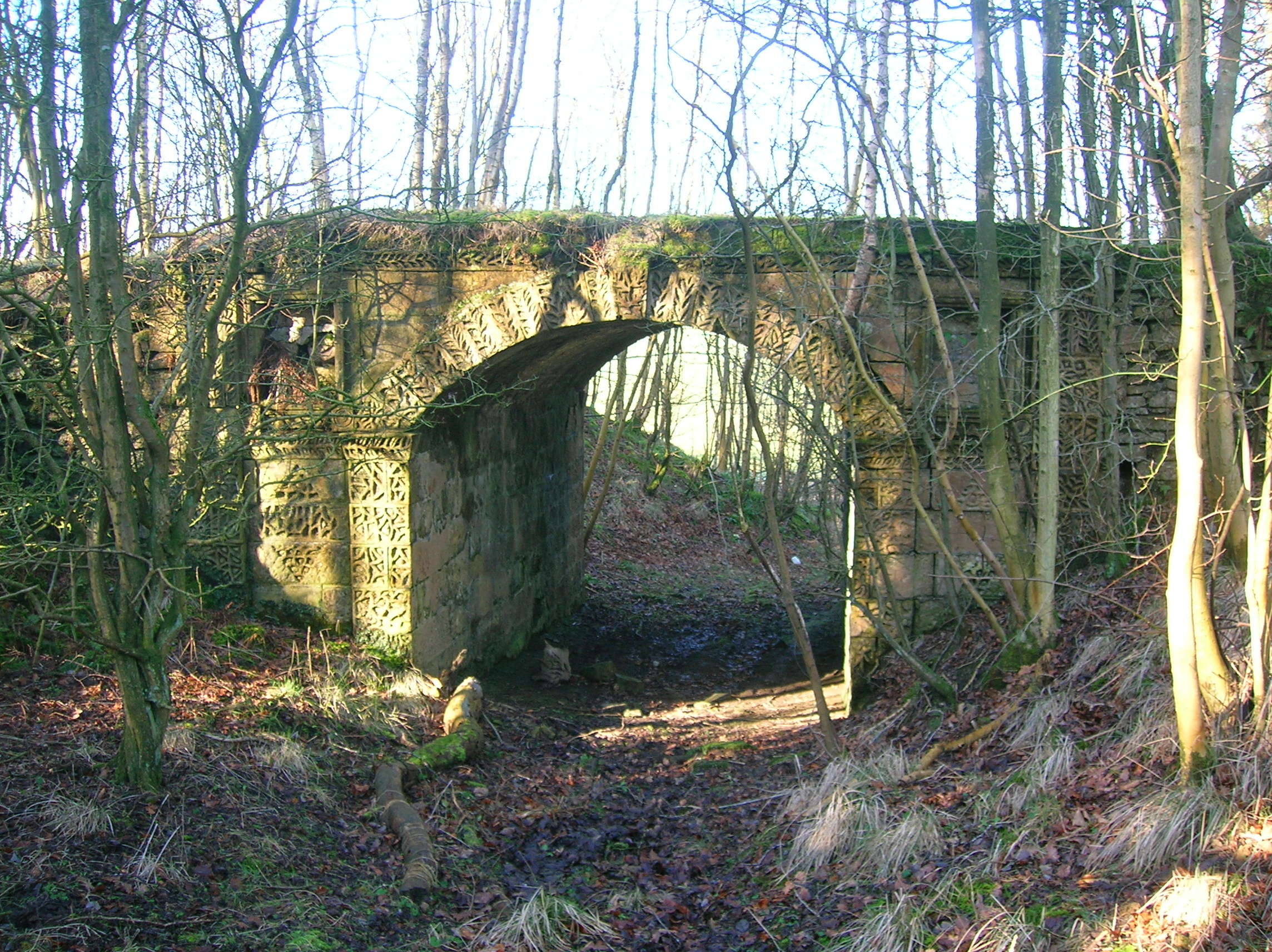
A view of the whole bridge looking towards the Lugton Water ford.

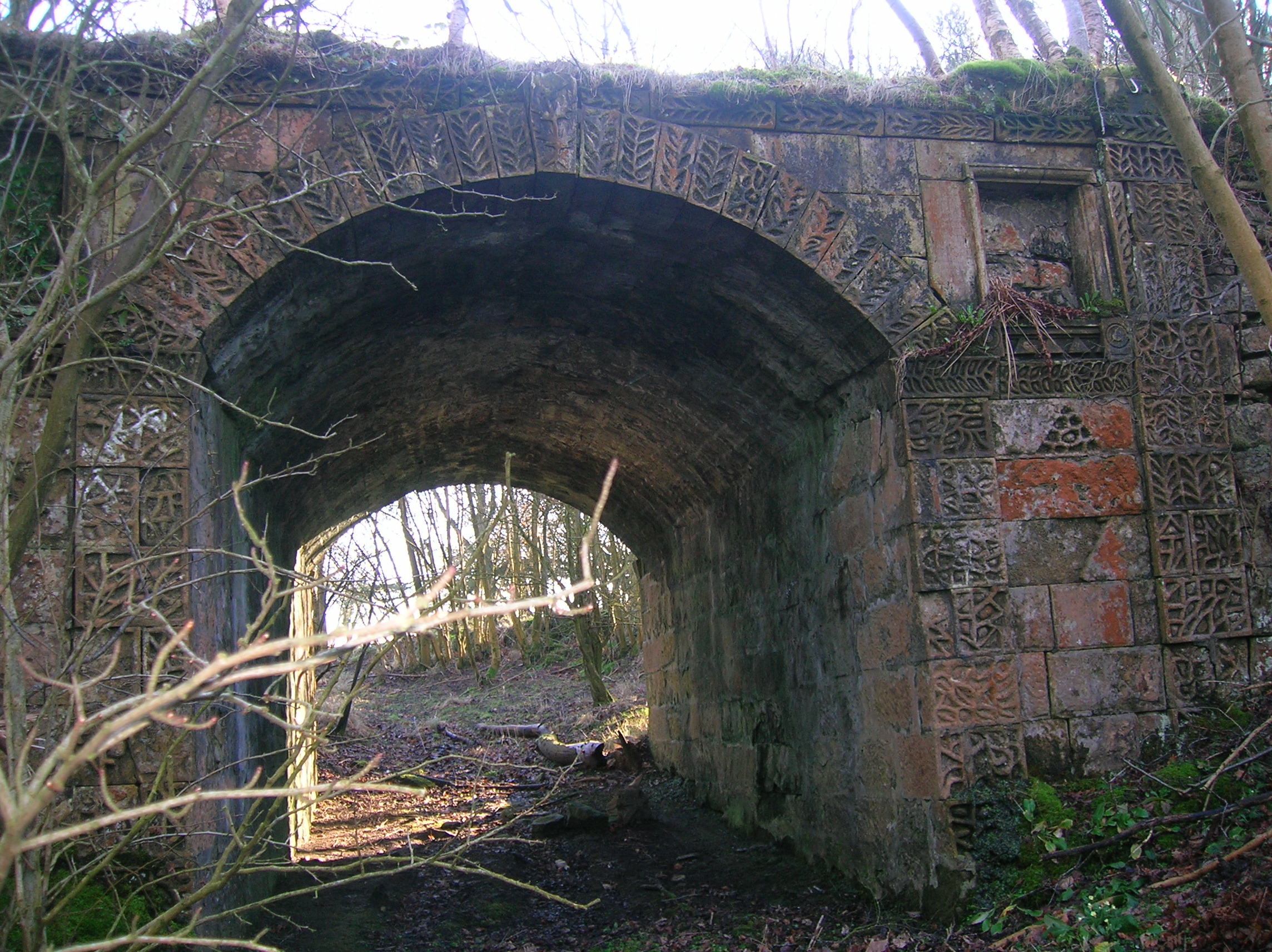
Detail of the bridge and its decoration from the Lugton Water side.

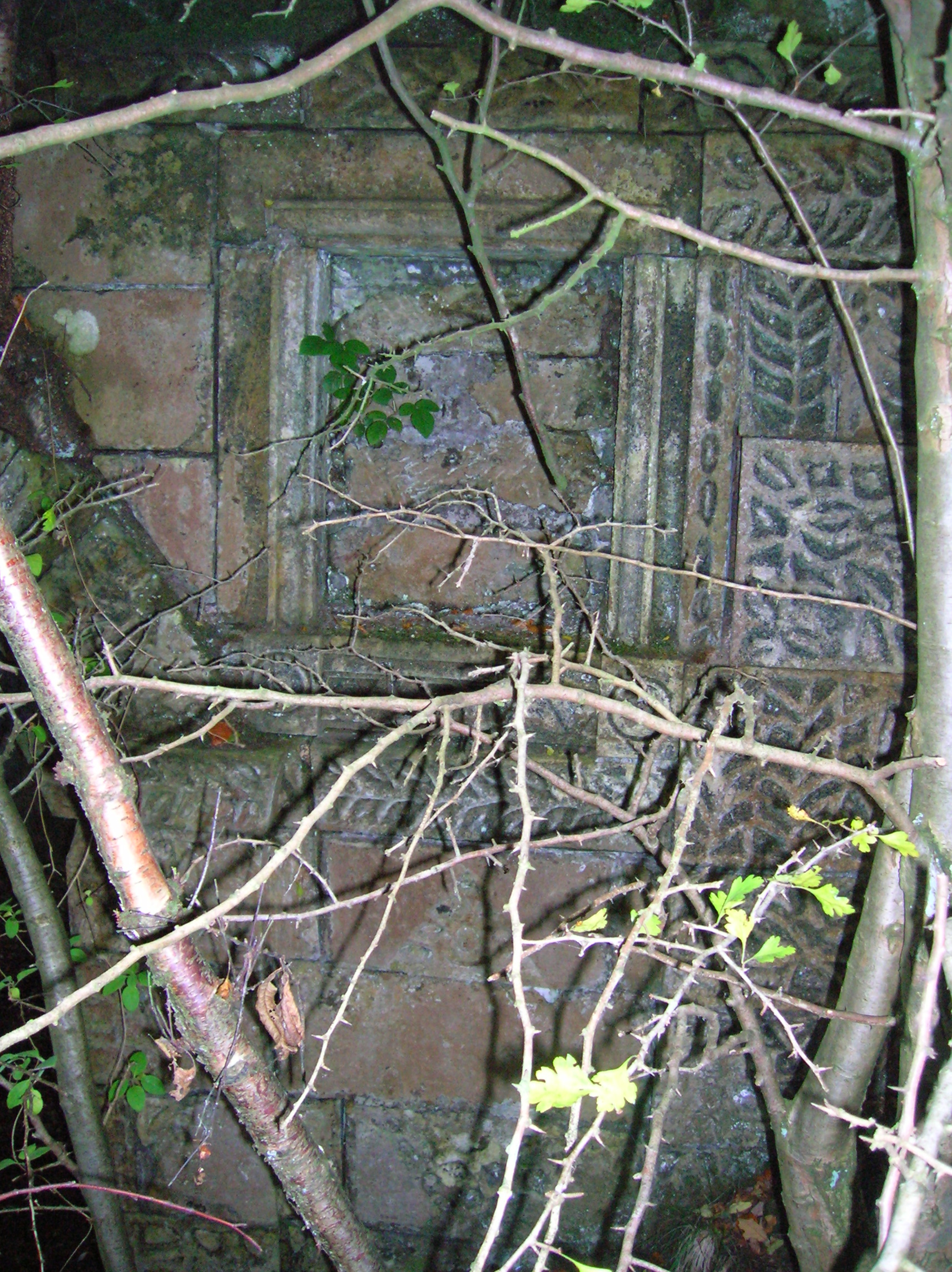
An insert for a coat of arms and other designs.

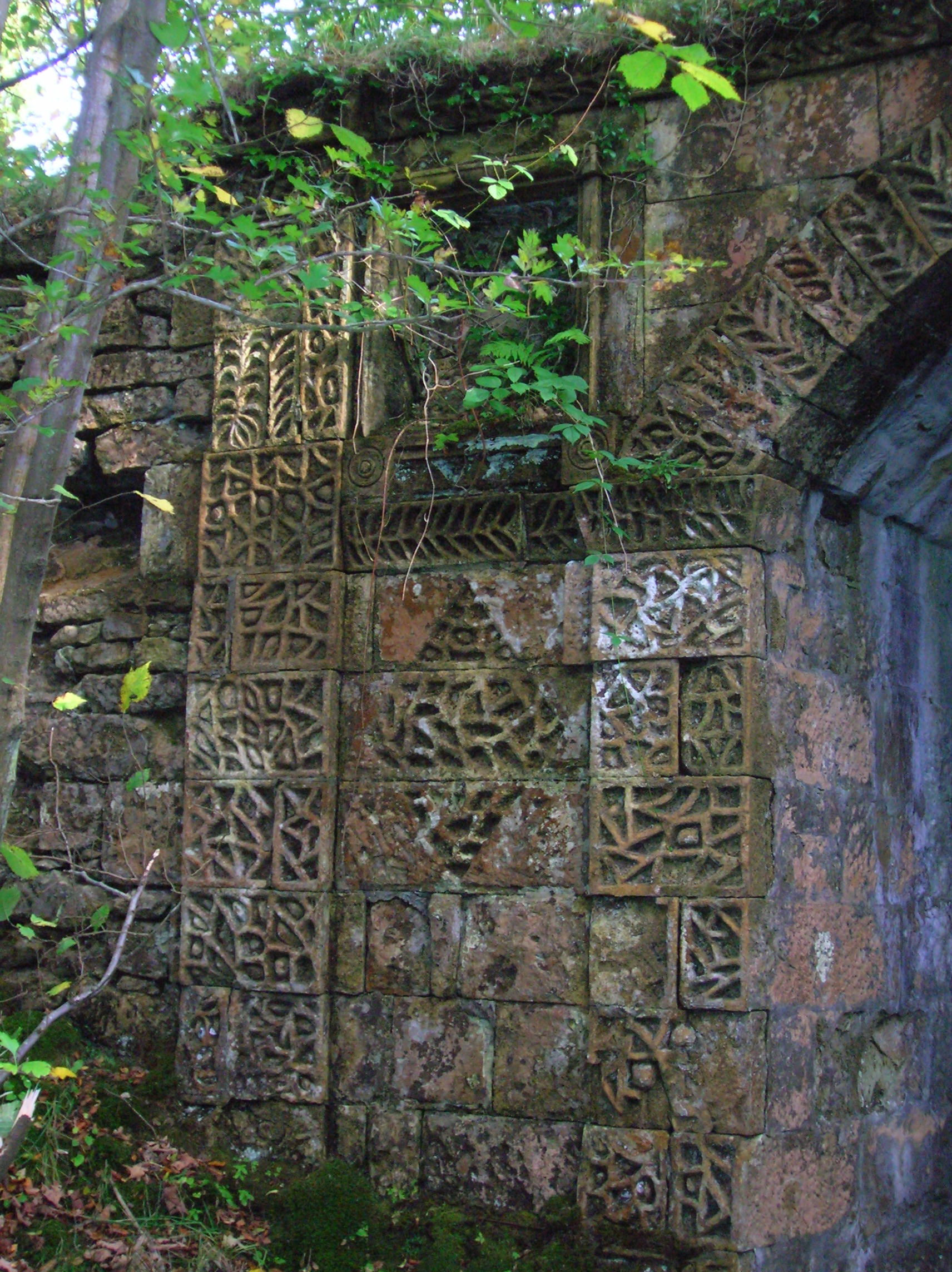
Coat of arms insert, diamond, leaf, vermiculate and other designs.

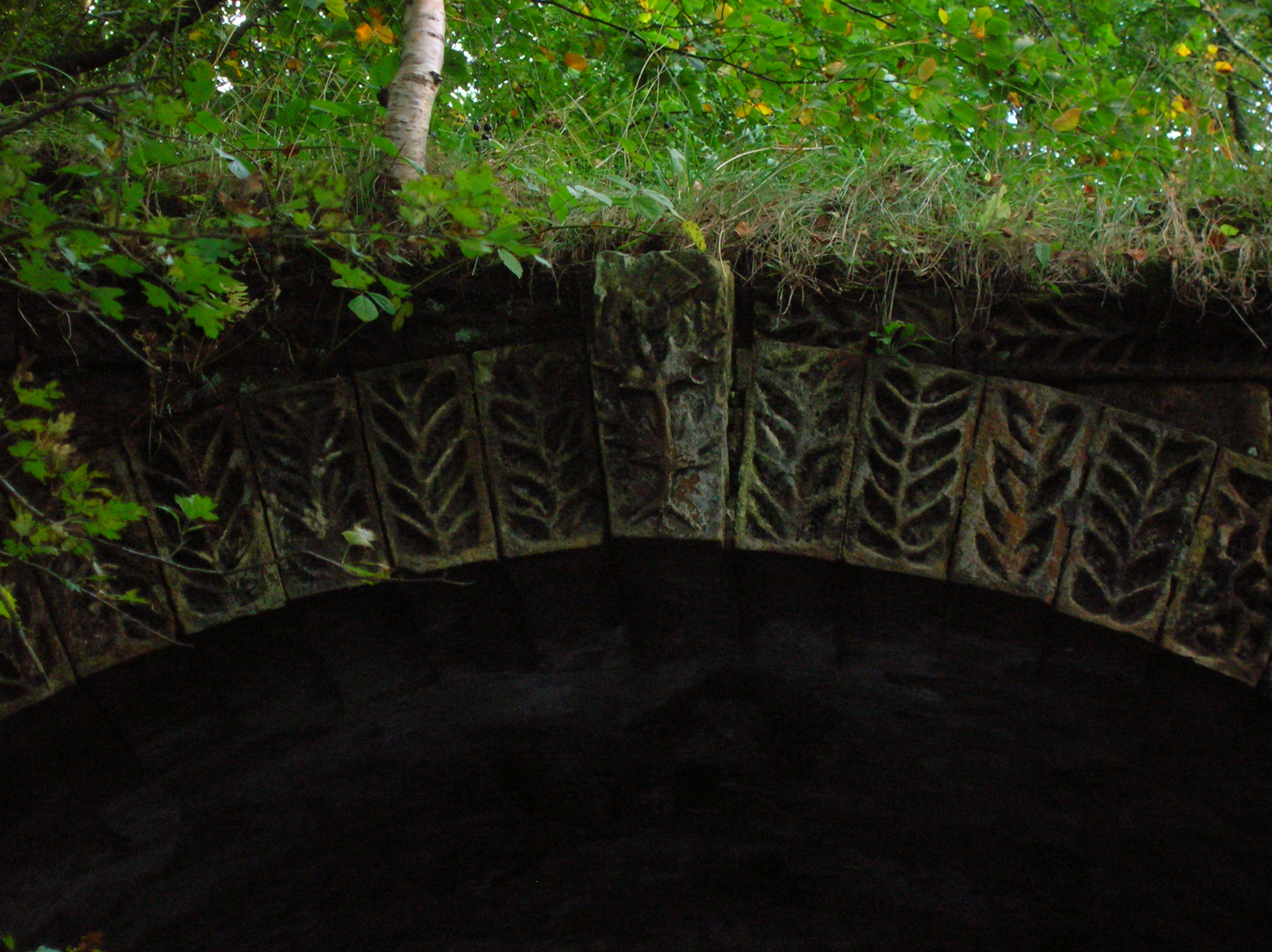
The thistle motif on the keystone and leaf-like designs.

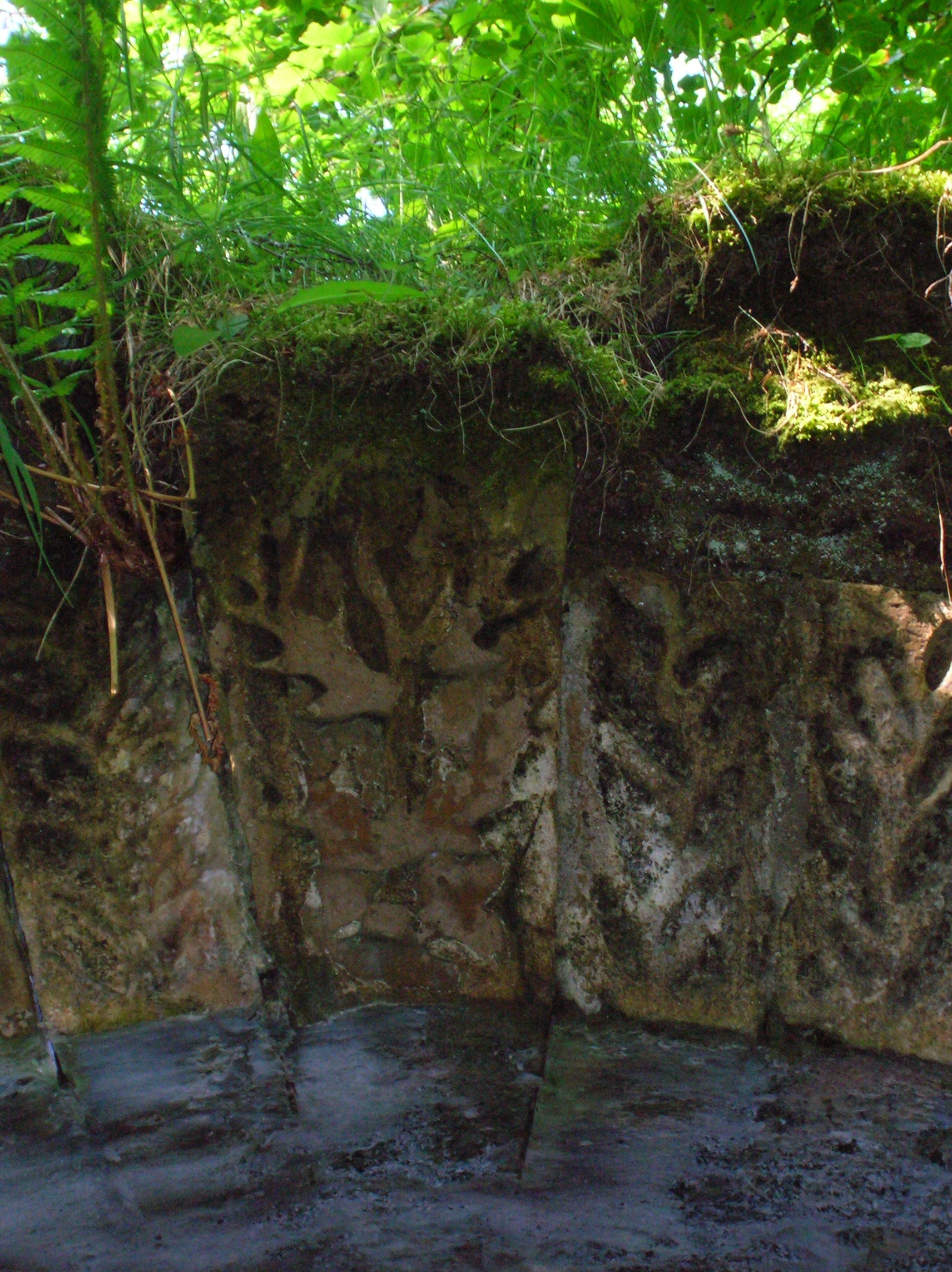
A close up of the thistle keystone.

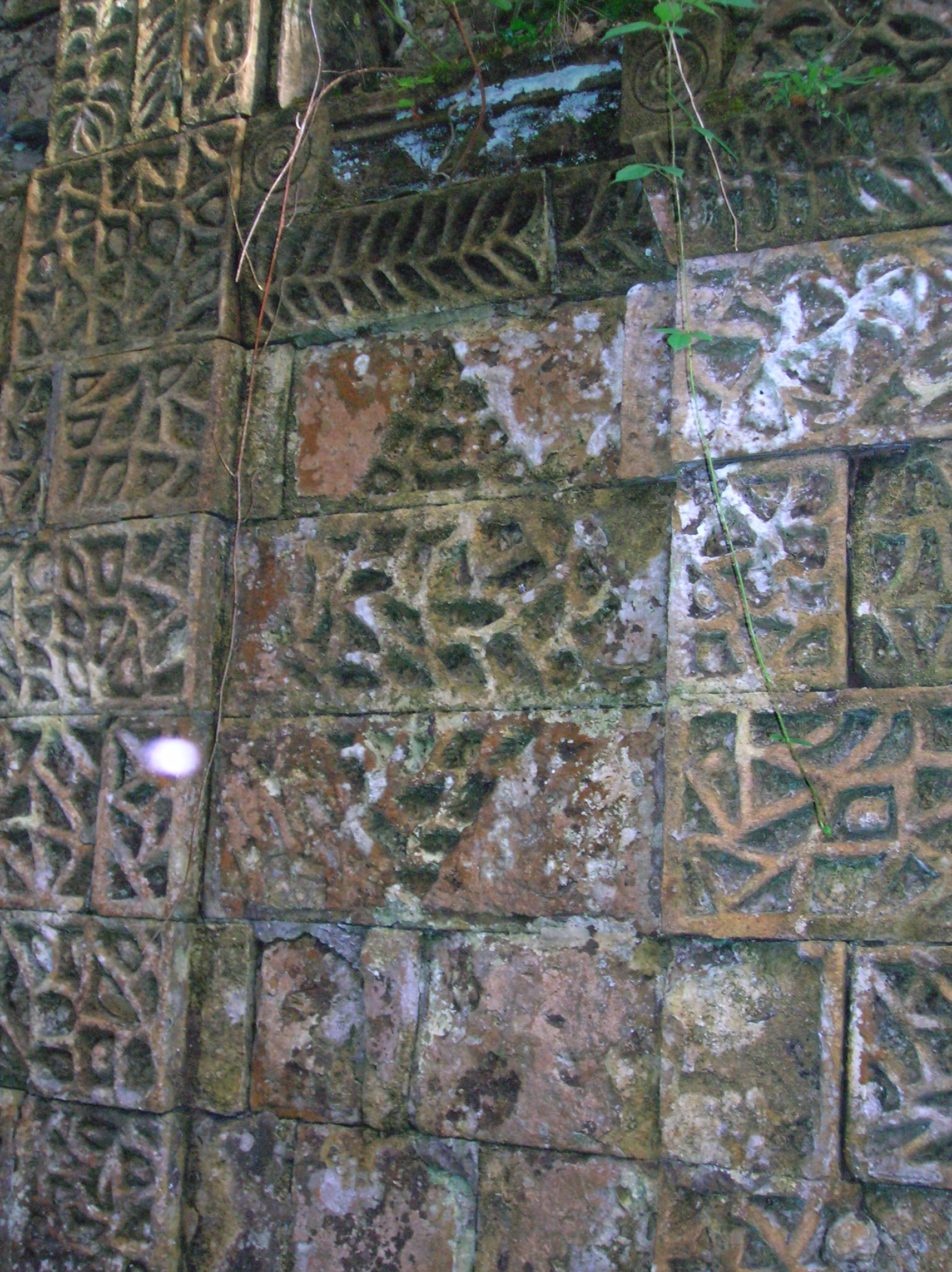
Diamond shape embellishments and other vermiculate designs and details.

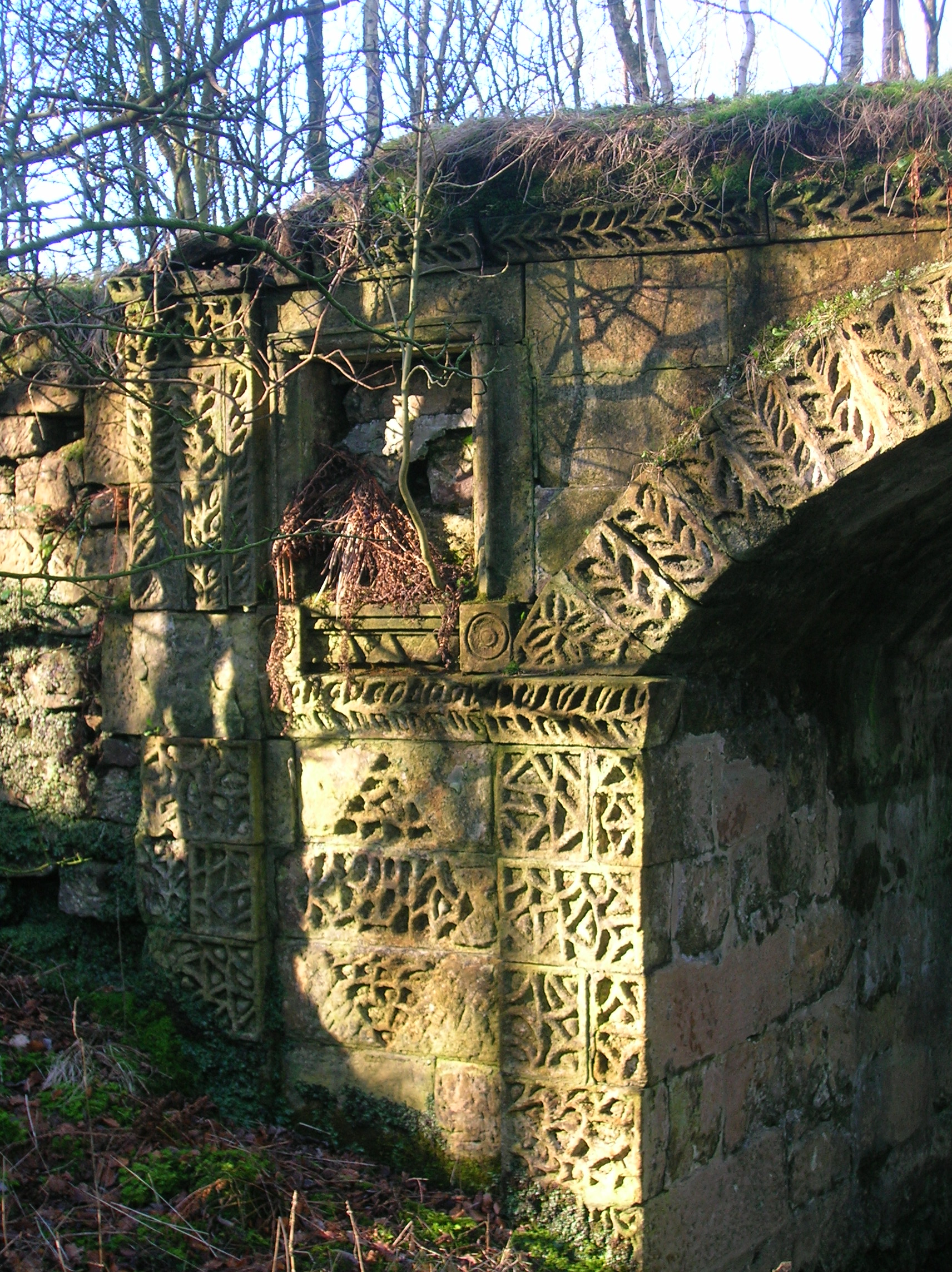
Detail of decorative carving.

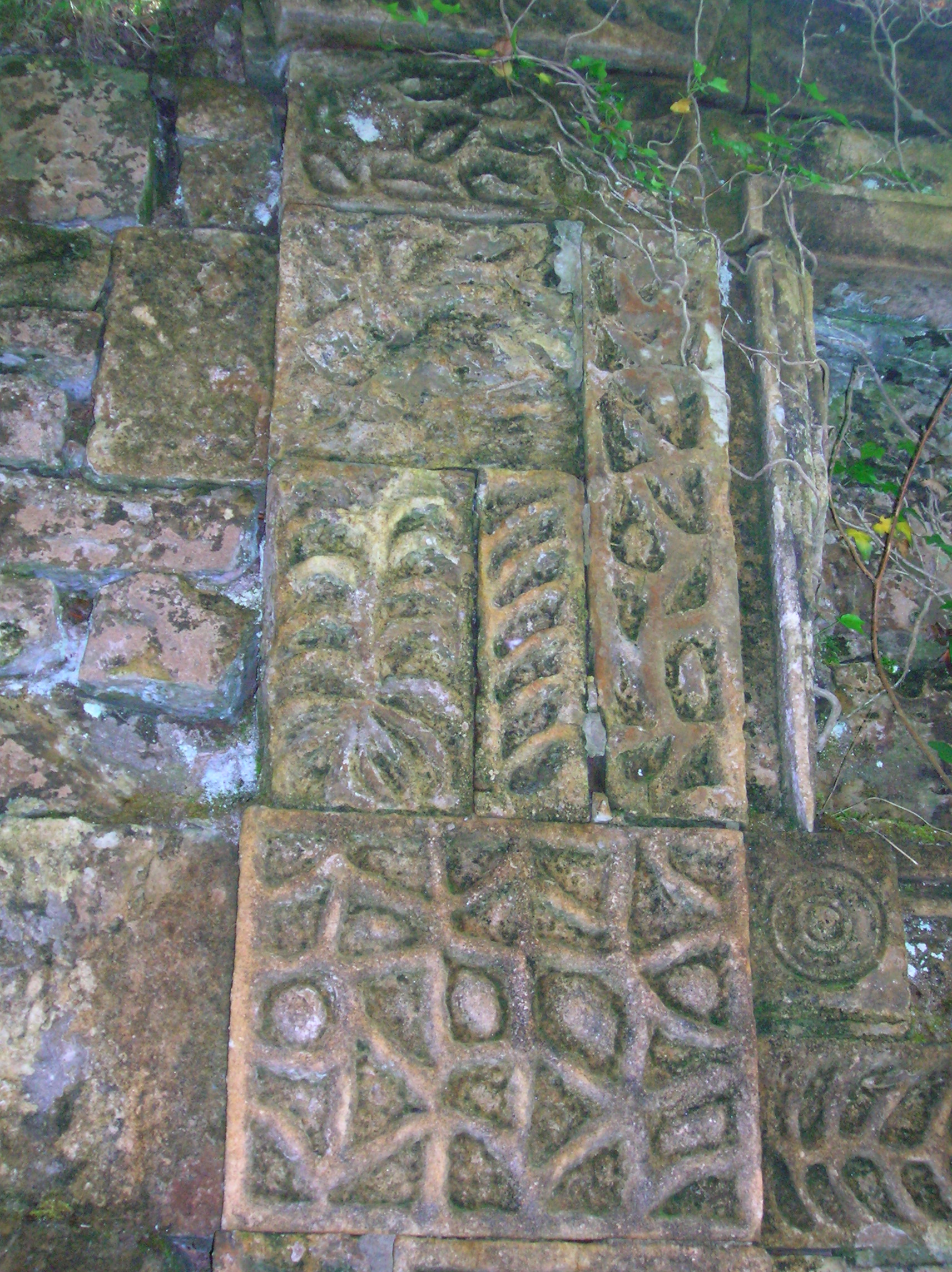
Detail of the ornate carving on the bridge abutment.

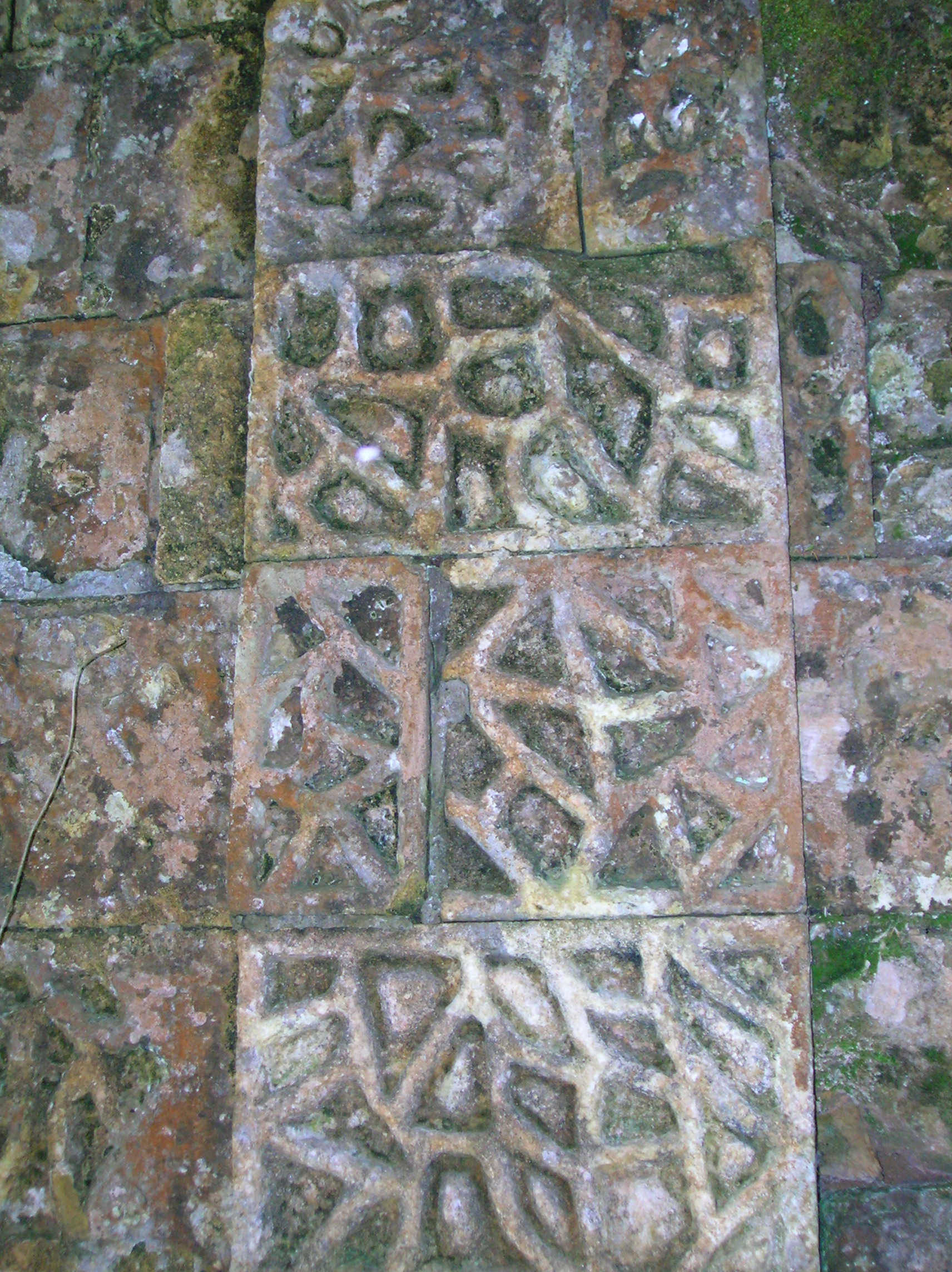
Further abutment detail.

== Montgreenan railway station ==
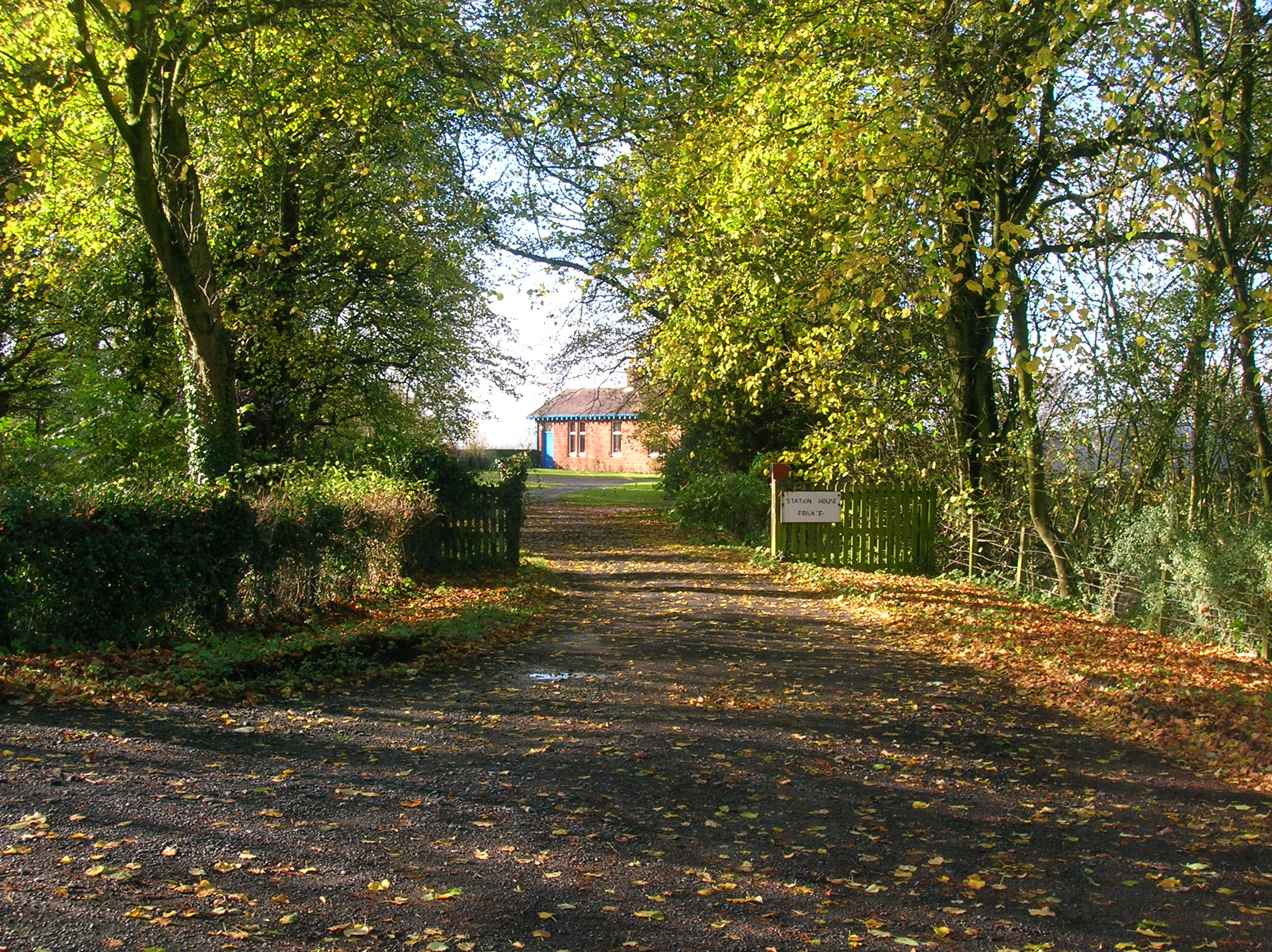
Montgreenan railway station and driveway.

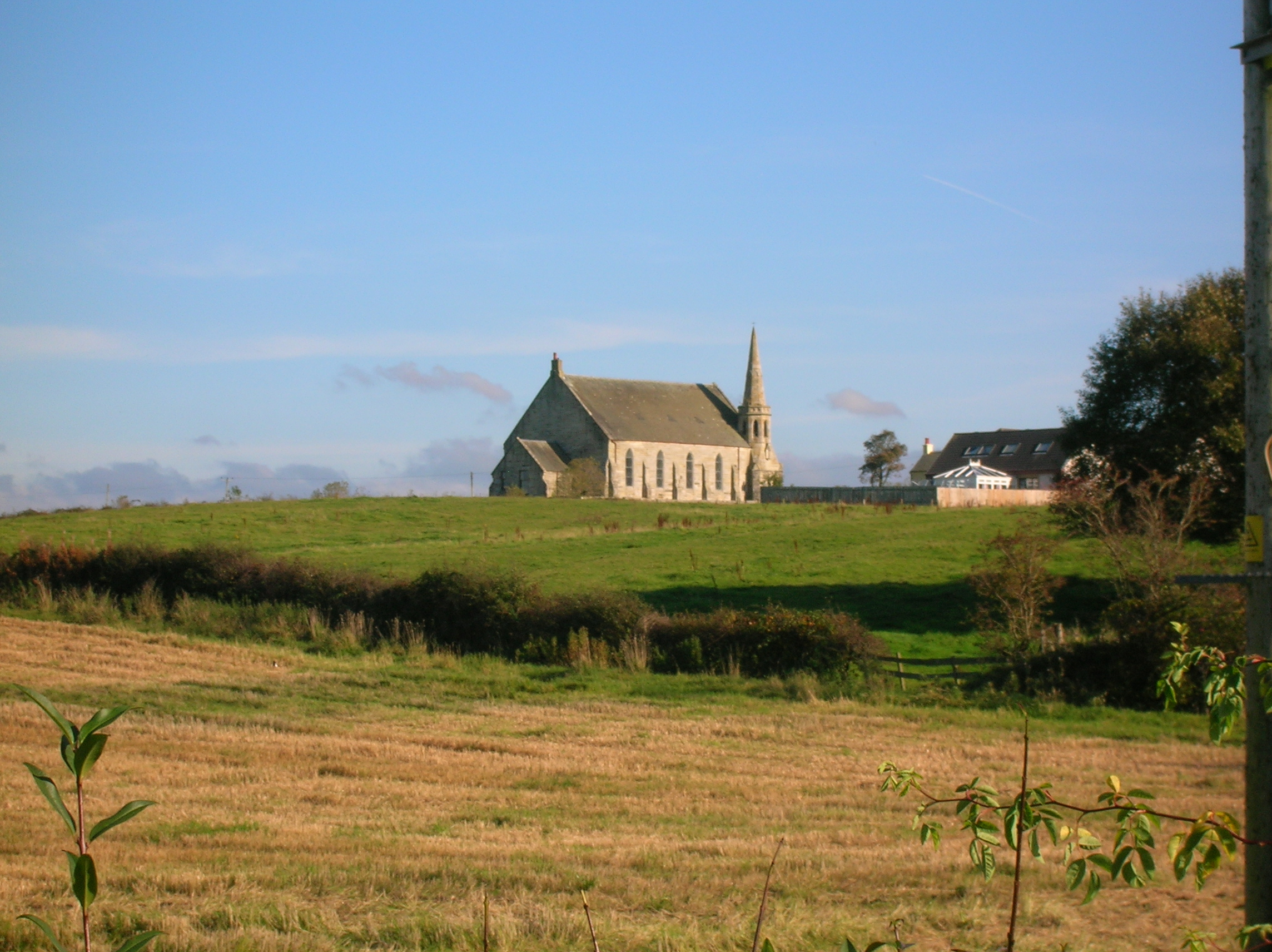
The old South Fergushill church at Benslie.

The Glasgow and South Western Railway built a station at Montgreenan which opened on 1 February 1878 and closed permanently to passengers on 7 March 1955. The station building is now a private residence. The house near the old entrance was the manse for the old Fergushill church at Benslie at one point and was previously used by the railway as a dwelling for their agent.

== The Lady in the peat ==
Dr. Duguid in around the 1840s records that near Clumbeith (Clonbeith) on the way to 'Meg'swa's' he met Pate Glunch cutting peats. Pate was normally a still, dour man, but on this occasion he was highly animated and took the doctor to see the long dead corpse of a 'bonnie lady' lying in a hole in the peat. She was around 18 to 20 years of age, had rosy cheeks, a sweet smile playing around her lips and blonde hair. Her identity was unknown, but a rumour linked her to the family of the Montgreenan estate.

== Natural history ==
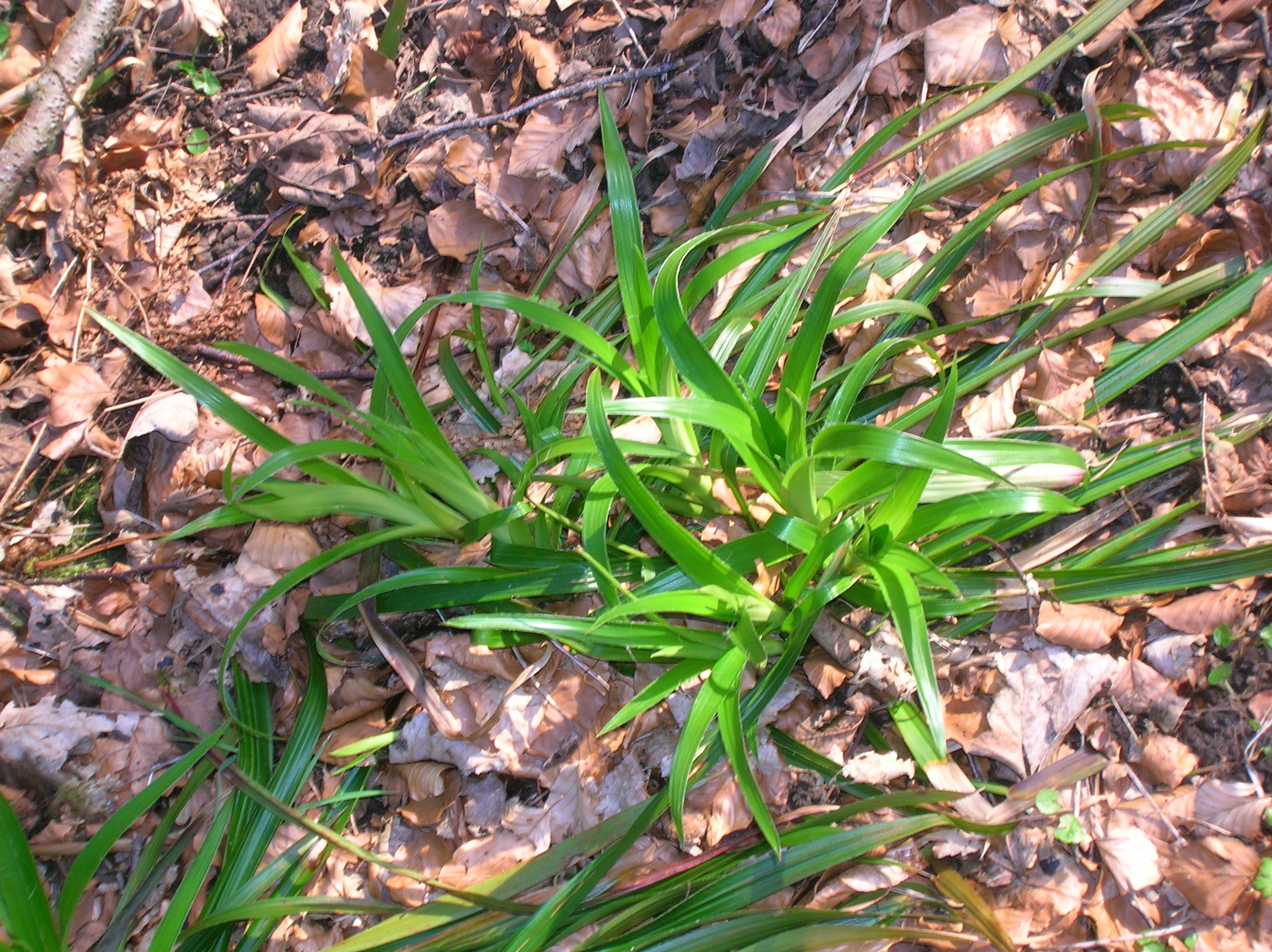
Greater Woodrush (Luzula sylvatica)in Spring.

The Old Wood in particular has a high biodiversity, some of the species noted in 2007 being Woodruff, Bird cherry, Primrose, Common violet, Oak, Stitchwort, Opposite-leaved Golden saxifrage, Bluebell, Greater Woodrush, Dog's mercury, Broad buckler fern, Lord and Ladies, Lady fern, Male shield fern, Easter ledges, Wood-rush, Wood-sedge, blackthorn, hawthorn, elm, alder, Wood anemone, Wood sorrel, Wood avens, Herb Robert, Red campion, and many liverworts. A number of badger setts are present.

== Legends and archaeology ==
It is said that a large part of the monks treasure from Kilwinning Abbey was found at Montgreenan circa 1740 by the laird, consisting of seven crocks of coins, rings, brooches, candlesticks, crosses, necklasses, pomanders, beads, etc. A local legend was that Alexander Cunninghame, the commendator of the abbey and living at Montgreenan had buried the abbey treasure, knowing that his life was in danger following the murder of the 4th Earl of Eglinton. He was murdered at the entrance to his home in 1586 and his ghost was said to protect the treasure.

John Smith in 1895 recorded that a pot of silver coins was found in the Chapel Park, on Montgreenan lands (NS 343 445). The existence of a pre-reformation chapel is not recorded other than this field name record.

== Micro history ==
The OS maps show that Benslie village was named 'Montgreenan' up until at least 1938, with the name Benslie given to the wood, the old farmhouse on the 'island' created by the three roads and the term Benslie Square. The postal address may have been the direct cause of the name change, preventing confusion with the Montgreenan estate.

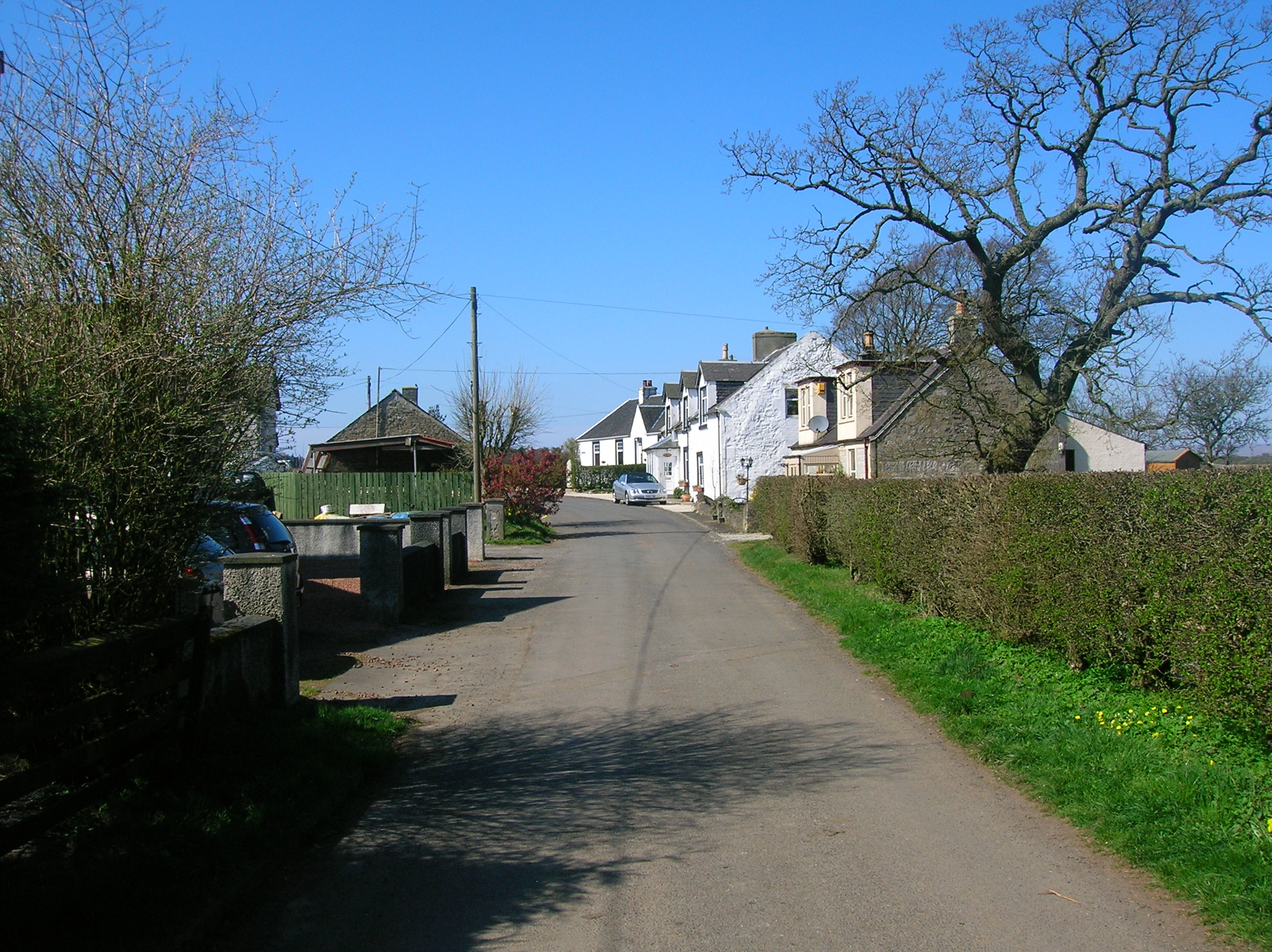
Auchentiber mainstreet looking towards the main road.

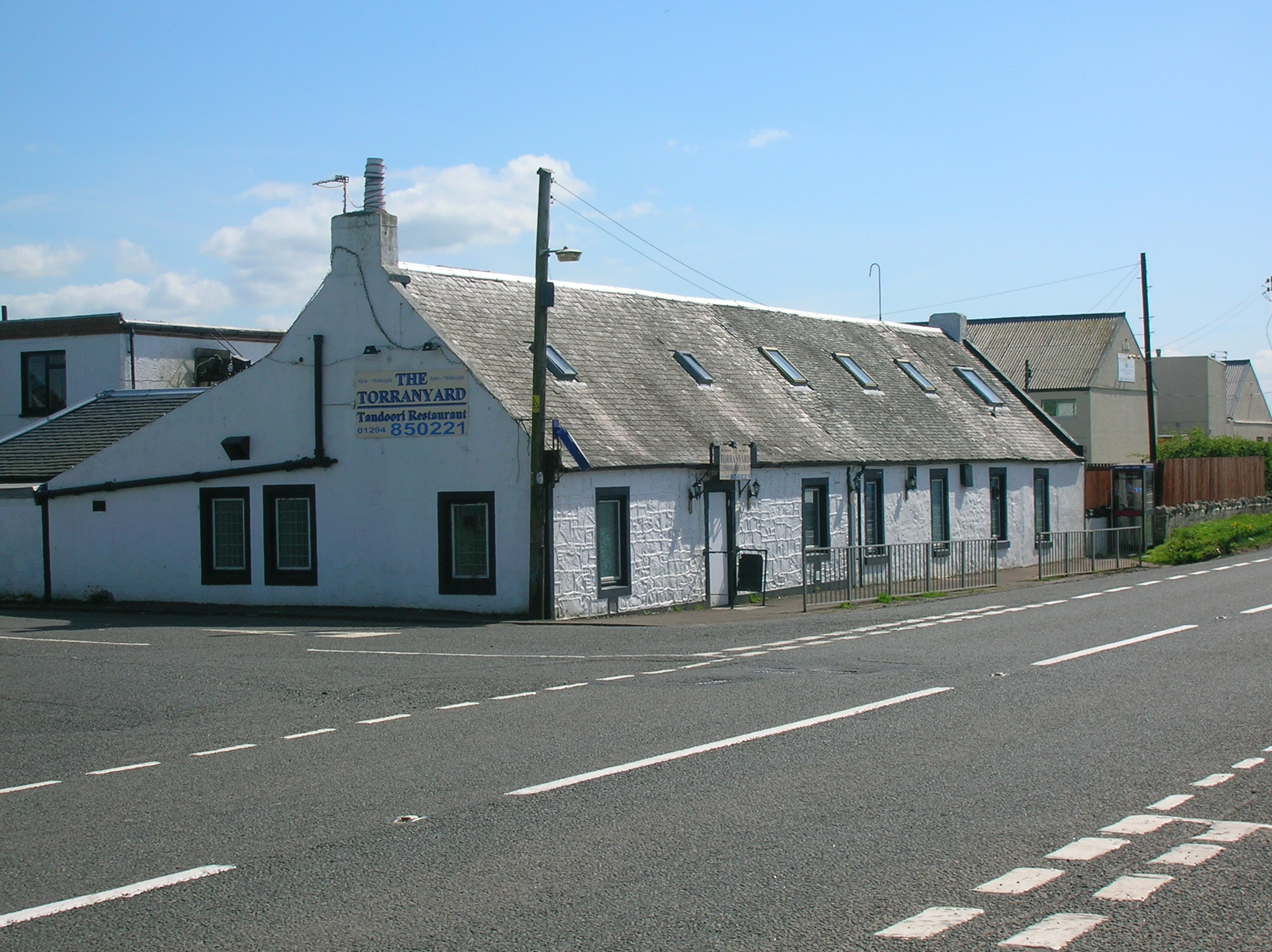
The Torranyard Inn.

Opposite Janburrow in Benslie is Burnbrae cottage, built as the Montgreenan Estate factor's house in 1846. Adjacent to Burnbrae is Burnbank Cottage which was built in 1882 for Mathew Kirkland, a former gamekeeper on the Eglinton estate. Burnbrae appears on General Roy's 18th century map and Aitkens map of 1828. The ruin of Auchenharvie Castle is a prominent feature of this flat landscape in the Torranyard area.

Bloak Moss has been scientifically investigated to ascertain its vegetational history through the analysis of core samples.

South Fergushill church in Benslie was built to serve Montgreenan, Fergushill, Doura and Benslie. It was consecrated on Sunday, 3 November 1879 and the first minister was then Rev. William McAlpine.

The Montgreenan coal mine was served by the railway that ran up via Sevenacres. It was abandoned prior to 1875.

== References and Bibliography ==
=== Sources ===
- Mines Department (1931). Catalogue of Plans of Abandoned Mines. London : HMSO.
- Service, John (1913). The Memorables of Robin Cummell. Paisley : Alexander Gardner.
- Service, John (1890). Thir Notandums, being the literary recreations of the Laird Canticarl of Mongrynen. Edinburgh : Y. J. Pentland.

== See also ==
- River Irvine
- Eglinton Country Park
- Auchentiber
- William Weir, 1st Viscount Weir Previous owners
