= Largs =

Town in North Ayrshire, Scotland

Coordinates: 55°47′42″N 04°52′12″W

Largs: Scottish Gaelic: An Leargaidh Ghallda
- Town
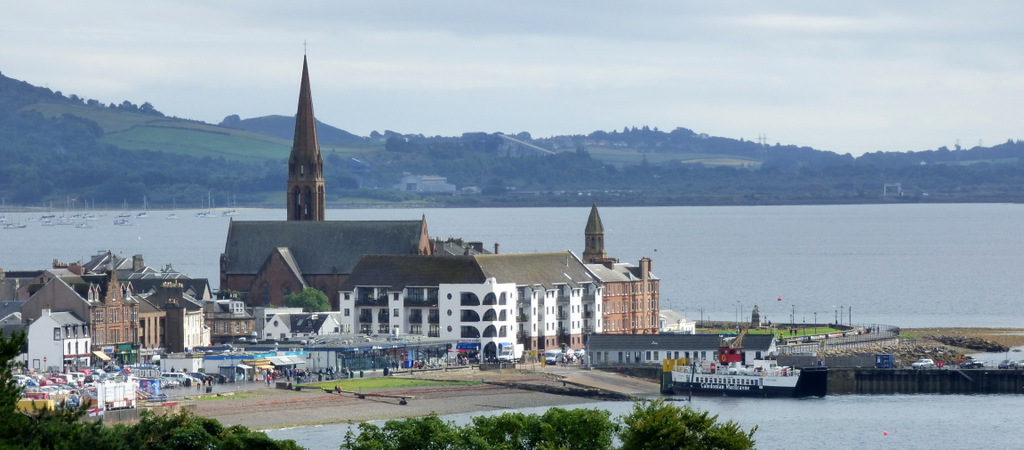
- Largs as viewed from Netherhall

- Location within North Ayrshire
- Population: 10,917 (2022)
- OS grid reference: NS203592
  - Edinburgh: 66 mi (106 km)
  - London: 354 mi (570 km)
- Council area: North Ayrshire
- Lieutenancy area: Ayrshire and Arran
- Country: Scotland
- Sovereign state: United Kingdom
- Post town: LARGS
- Postcode district: KA30
- Dialling code: 01475
- Police: Scotland
- Fire: Scottish
- Ambulance: Scottish
- UK Parliament: North Ayrshire and Arran
- Scottish Parliament: Cunninghame North

Largs (Scottish Gaelic: An Leargaidh Ghallda) is a coastal town on the Firth of Clyde in North Ayrshire, Scotland. The original name means "the slopes" (An Leargaidh) in Scottish Gaelic. A popular seaside resort with a pier, the town's population was 10,917 in 2022.

The town markets itself on its historic links with the Vikings and an annual festival is held each year in early September. In 1263, it was the site of the Battle of Largs between the Norwegian and the Scottish armies.

== History ==
=== Early origins ===
There is evidence of human activity in the vicinity of Largs which can be dated to the Neolithic era. The Haylie Chambered Tomb in Douglas Park dates from c. 3000 BC. Largs evolved from the estates of North Cunninghame over which the Montgomeries of Skelmorlie became temporal lords in the seventeenth century. Sir Robert Montgomerie built Skelmorlie Aisle in the ancient kirk of Largs in 1636 as a family mausoleum. Today the monument is all that remains of the old kirk. From its beginnings as a small village around its kirk, Largs evolved into a busy and popular seaside resort in the nineteenth century. Large hotels appeared and the pier was constructed in 1834. It was not until 1895, however, that the railway made the connection to Largs, sealing the town's popularity.

It also became a fashionable place to live in and several impressive mansions were built, the most significant of which included 'Netherhall', the residence of William Thomson, Lord Kelvin, the physicist and engineer.

=== Battle of Largs ===
Largs has historical connections much further back, however. It was the site of the Battle of Largs in 1263, in which parts of a Scottish army attacked a small force of Norwegians attempting to salvage ships from a fleet carrying the armies of King Magnus Olafsson of Mann and the Isles and his liege lord King Haakon IV of Norway, beached during a storm. The Norwegians and islemen had been raiding the Scottish coast for some time, and the Scots under Alexander III had been following the fleet, attempting to catch its raiding parties. The outcome of this confrontation is uncertain, as both sides claim victory in their respective chronicles and sagas and the only independent source of the war fails to mention the battle at all. The battle was followed soon after by the death of the 59 year old King Haakon in Bishop's Palace on Orkney. Following the king's demise, his more lenient son Magnus VI of Norway agreed the Treaty of Perth in 1266, under which the Hebrides were sold to Scotland, as was the Isle of Man after the demise of Magnus Olafsson.

The Largs war memorial dates from 1920 and was designed by Sir Robert Lorimer.

=== During World War II ===
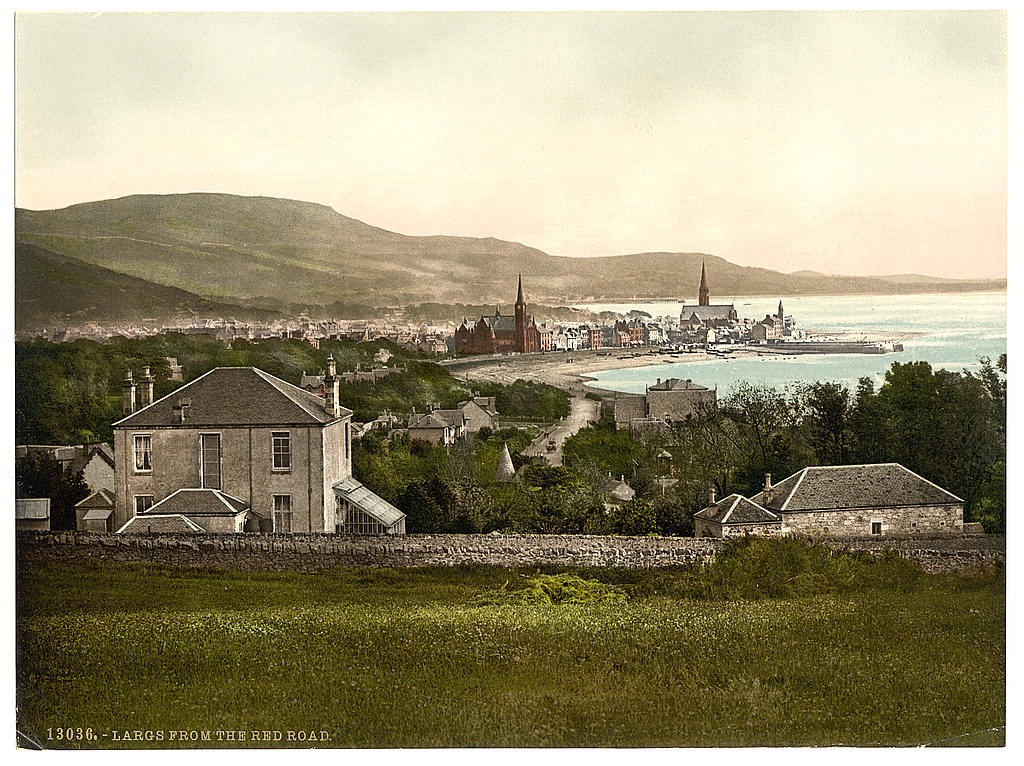
Largs, Scotland, ca. 1890 - 1900.

During World War II, the Hollywood Hotel was designated HMS Warren, which was Headquarters, Combined Training. A conference was held there between 28 June 1943 and 2 July 1943, code name RATTLE, under Lord Louis Mountbatten. It was known as the "Field of the Cloth of Gold" (named after a famous historic event) because of the number of high-ranking officers taking part. The decision that the invasion of Europe would take place in Normandy was made at this conference. Churchill and Eisenhower attended the conference, staying at St Phillans which later became the Manor Park Hotel.

King Haakon VII of Norway, then in exile in Britain due to the German occupation of his kingdom, visited Largs in 1944 and was made the town's first honorary citizen.

== Demography ==
=== Culture ===
The Largs Viking Festival is an annual event held in the town, to commemorate the Battle of Largs, a pivotal conflict between the Scots and the Norsemen. First held in 1980, the festival takes place each year between late August to early September. It features traditional Viking crafts and displays, parades, live music, markets, and fairground rides. The closing night of the festival features a battle reenactment, the burning of a Viking longship and a fireworks display. The festival attracts thousands of visitors each year, celebrating the towns Viking heritage and history. Barrfields Pavilion, as it was originally known, was officially opened on 11 April 1930, as a popular variety theatre to cater for the thousands of summer tourists who visited the town. Originally seating 1003, it was home to the lavish Barrfields Summer Season Revues. Many international Scottish entertainers and actors have played the theatre over the years including Rikki Fulton, Jack Milroy, Jimmy Logan, Stanley Baxter, The Krankies, Ronnie Corbett, Johnny Beattie, Billy Connolly and from south of the border, Frankie Vaughan and Pat Kirkwood. In 1995, the pavilion was refurbished and reconstructed into a visitor centre known as “Vikingar!”.

Since 2012, Largs hosts the popular Largs Live on the last weekend in June with live music around pubs, restaurants and other venues over Friday, Saturday and Sunday.

The Kelburn Garden Party is an annual music and arts festival that takes place over 4 days in the grounds of Kelburn Castle each summer. Established in 2009, the festival has become increasing popular and often sells out the 4,000 tickets available. Largs hosted the National Mòd in 1956, 1965 and 2002.

=== Transport ===
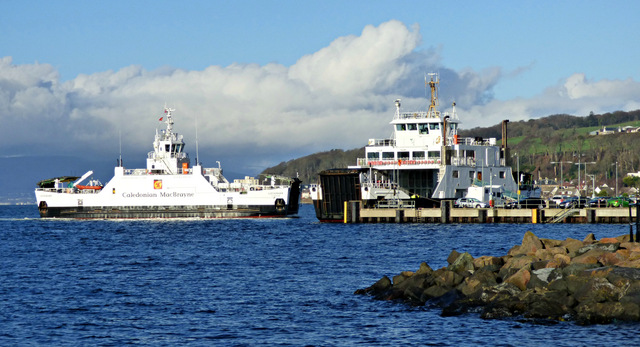
Ferries docked at Largs Pier and Harbour

The town is served by Largs railway station with regular services to and from Glasgow Central station. A Caledonian MacBrayne ferry service runs from Largs to Great Cumbrae. Since 2007, the route has been operated by MV Loch Shira. During the summer months, the paddle steamer Waverley also calls in at Largs pier during cruises. Largs lies on the main A78 road.

Stagecoach West Scotland run bus services from Largs towards Irvine and Ayr along with McGill’s Bus Services running services to Greenock, Paisley and Glasgow. The town also has a local bus service, operated by Shuttle Buses.

=== Geography and climate ===
The Noddsdale Water flows from the north to reach the sea at the north end of Largs, and Brisbane House sited in the dale about 1.5 km (0.93 mi) up the river was the birthplace of the soldier and Governor of New South Wales Sir Thomas Brisbane, whose name was given to the city of Brisbane in Queensland, Australia, and, in 1823, to "Brisbane Water" on the NSW Central Coast. Noddsdale was renamed Brisbane Glen in his honour.

Largs has an oceanic climate (Köppen: Cfb).

Climate data for Largs (1991–2020)
Month	Jan	Feb	Mar	Apr	May	Jun	Jul	Aug	Sep	Oct	Nov	Dec	Year
Mean daily maximum °C (°F)	8.3 (46.9)	8.2 (46.8)	9.7 (49.5)	12.0 (53.6)	15.7 (60.3)	17.8 (64.0)	19.9 (67.8)	19.4 (66.9)	16.4 (61.5)	13.4 (56.1)	10.2 (50.4)	8.8 (47.8)	13.3 (55.9)
Mean daily minimum °C (°F)	2.9 (37.2)	3.5 (38.3)	3.7 (38.7)	5.3 (41.5)	7.9 (46.2)	10.6 (51.1)	12.7 (54.9)	11.7 (53.1)	10.3 (50.5)	7.4 (45.3)	4.9 (40.8)	3.2 (37.8)	7.0 (44.6)
Average rainfall mm (inches)	148.5 (5.85)	108.2 (4.26)	114.7 (4.52)	82.0 (3.23)	74.9 (2.95)	84.1 (3.31)	91.9 (3.62)	103.9 (4.09)	113.0 (4.45)	150.2 (5.91)	146.4 (5.76)	141.1 (5.56)	1,358.8 (53.50)
Mean monthly sunshine hours	52.1	74.8	101.2	157.7	200.1	167.0	164.0	141.8	110.1	80.0	49.4	34.9	1,333.1
Source: Met Office

=== Sports ===
Largs Thistle Football Club, nicknamed The Theesel, were formed in 1889. Since 1930 they have played at Barrfields Park which has a capacity of 4,500. Currently playing in the Lowland League West, they wear gold and black strips. Their main rivals are Beith Juniors and Kilbirnie Ladeside. Largs Thistle notably lifted the Scottish Junior Cup on 15 May 1994 after beating Glenafton Athletic 1–0 in the final at Ibrox Stadium in front of 8,000 spectators. They have reached two further Scottish Junior Cup finals in 2010 and 2019, however they lost on both occasions.

Inverclyde Sports Centre is a sports training facility in Largs which caters for both elite athletes and the local community in a range of sports and activities. It was officially opened in 1958 by Queen Elizabeth II and her husband Prince Philip. Largs is home to two golf courses. Largs Golf Club was opened on the south end of the town in 1891. Routenburn Golf Club was opened on the north end of the town in 1914, and was designed by renowned golf architect James Braid.

=== Education ===
Since 2018, Largs has been served by Largs Campus, an amalgamation of Secondary, Early Years and Primary schools which includes; Largs Academy, Largs Primary, St Mary's Primary and Largs Early Years. Built at a cost of £52 million, the state of the art facility supports 2,120 students between ages 3-18. It was officially opened by First Minister of Scotland Nicola Sturgeon in June 2018.

== Places of interest ==
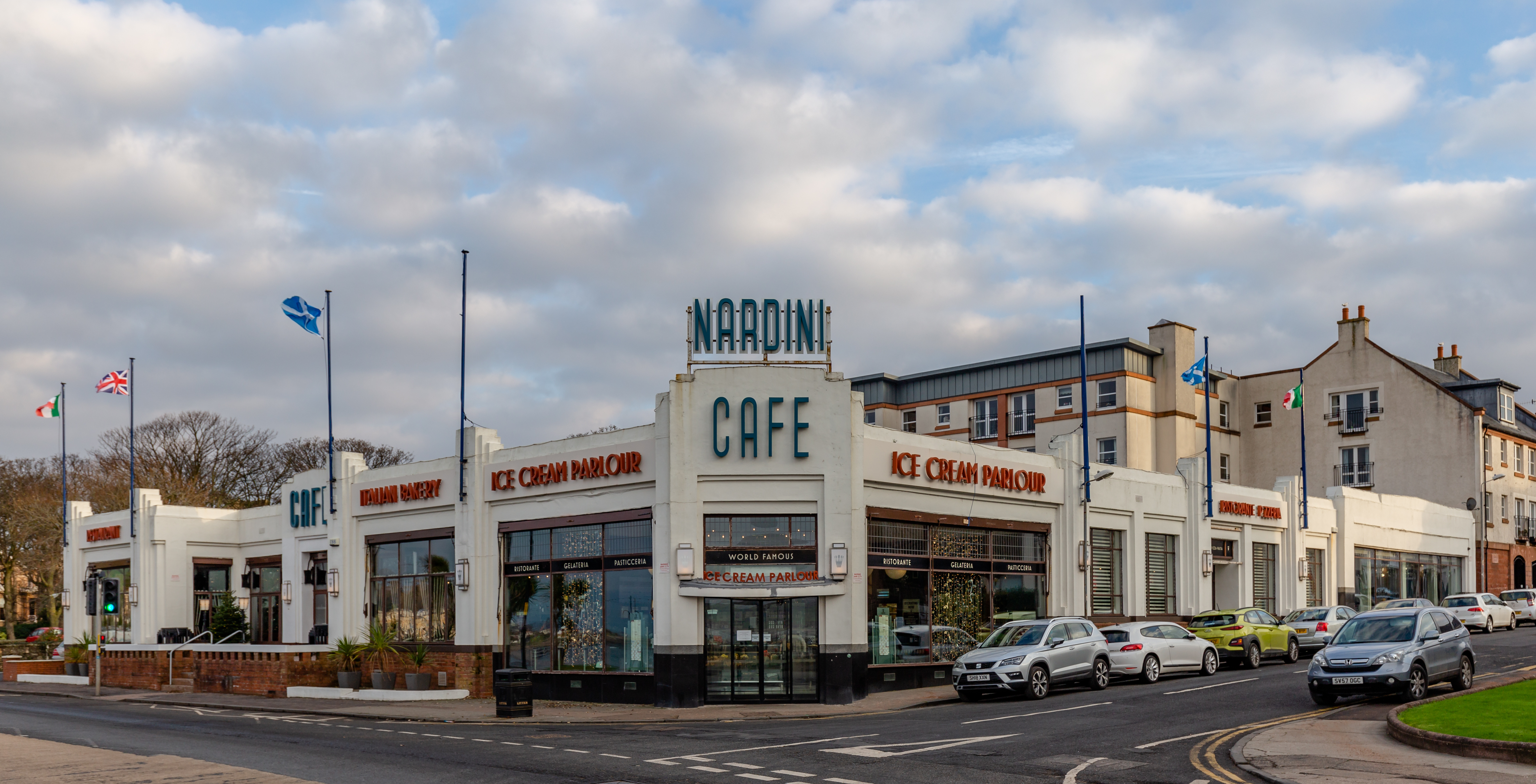
Nardini Lounge (2018)

Despite its diminished status as a holiday resort, much of Largs is still geared towards tourism. The Vikingar Centre at Barrfields is an interactive look into the history of Viking life; Kelburn Country Centre, Barrfields Pavilion Theatre, Largs Swimming Pool, Douglas Park and Inverclyde National Sports Training Centre are other attractions. Nardinis is a famous ice cream parlour, cafe and restaurant, that dominates the Esplanade and which reopened in late 2008 following clearance from Historic Scotland and major renovation works. St. Columba's Parish Church is situated opposite Nardinis and contains a Heritage Centre. The church itself was built in 1892 and is notable for its stained glass windows and Willis organ.

There is a Neolithic tomb behind Douglas Park. Known as the Haylie Chambered Tomb, it was once covered by a cairn of stones (known as Margaret's Law). When it was uncovered in the early twentieth century the tomb was dated to around 3000 to 2000 BC. Skelmorlie Aisle, adjoining the local museum, is in the care of Historic Scotland and is open during the summer. Kelburn Castle, situated between Largs and Fairlie, is the ancestral home of the Boyle (originally de Boyville) family, the hereditary Earls of Glasgow. Kelburn is believed to be the oldest castle in Scotland to have been continuously inhabited by the same family. The de Boyvilles who originated in Caen in Normandy came up after the Norman Conquest of England in 1066. The forebears of the modern day Boyles settled at Kelburn around 1140.

The 'Prophet's Grave' is located in the Brisbane Glen close to Middleton Farm. In 1647 the Reverend William Smith died from the 'plague' whilst ministering to his parishioners who had temporarily forsaken Largs as a result of the aforementioned plague. William asked to be buried in the glen next to the Noddsdale Water and prophesied that if the two rowan trees planted at either end of his grave were prevented from touching then the plague would never return to Largs. The grave is in a delightful spot during the day and was a popular tourist attraction with postcards available and a thorough restoration in 1956. Night visits, however, have resulted in reports of ghost sightings and unusual phenomenon. The prophecy has been of debatable efficacy. However it has meant that his grave has been well looked after for around four hundred years.

== Notable people ==
- Abby Kane (born 2003), Paralympic swimmer, won the silver medal in the 100m backstroke S13 event at the 2016 Summer Paralympics in Rio de Janeiro.
- Benny Gallagher (born 1945), of Gallagher and Lyle, was born in the town and has held Songwriting Masterclasses in the Vikingar to encourage local musicians to embrace their talent.
- Daniela Nardini (born 1966), actress, was born in Largs.
- Graham Lyle (born 1944) was brought up in the town.
- John Scott and his younger brother Robert Sinclair Scott were influential shipbuilders of the Scotts Shipbuilding and Engineering Company
- Lord Kelvin (William Thomson) lived in Largs, in Netherall mansion, and died there in 1907.
- Sam Torrance (born 1953), golfer, was born in Largs.
- Sir Thomas Brisbane (1773–1860), 6th Governor of New South Wales
- William Smith, minister
- William Wilton (1865–1920), football manager and first manager of Rangers Football Club.

== Twin towns ==
Largs is twinned with:

- Andernos-les-Bains, Gironde, France.

== See also ==
- HMS Largs
- Largs Academy
- Stones of Scotland
