= Largs Academy =

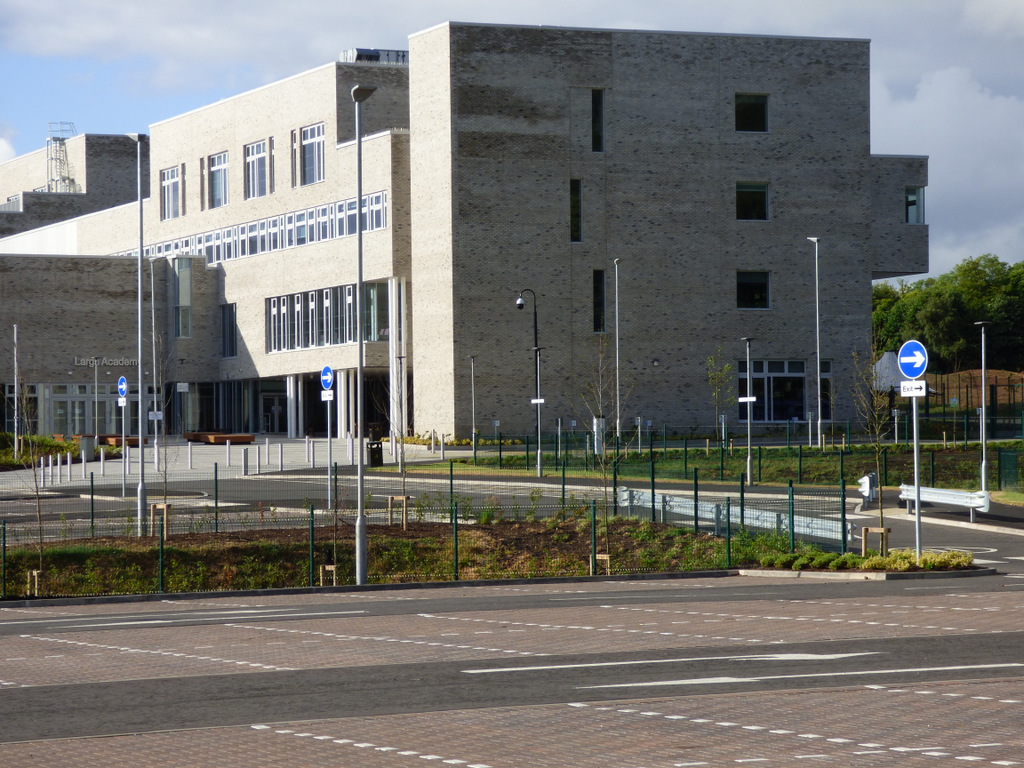
- School badge Largs Academy section of the Largs Campus

Location
- Largs Campus, Alexander Avenue; Largs, North Ayrshire, KA30 9DR; Scotland; 55.800°N 4.8539°W

Information
- Type: Secondary School
- Mottoes: Labora et Disce (English: Work and Learn)
- Established: 1970
- Headteacher: John Docherty
- Staff: 84 FTE
- Gender: Mixed
- Age: 11 to 18
- Enrollment: 1,076 (2012)
- Houses: Arran; Bute; Cowal; Kintyre; Mull
- Colour
- School years: S1-S6
- Website: http://largsacademy.com

Largs Academy is an 11–18 secondary school in Largs, North Ayrshire, Scotland, which opened in August 1970. It serves the towns of Largs, Fairlie, Skelmorlie and the island of Cumbrae, as well as taking placement requests from across Scotland, from places such as West Kilbride, Beith and Renfrewshire. As of March 2017, Largs Academy was in the top 30 schools for Higher Results in Scotland, sitting at number 27.

== Overview ==
=== Feeder schools ===
Largs Academy has five feeder schools, St. Mary's Primary School, Largs Primary (an amalgamation of the previous Brisbane and Kelburn Primaries), Cumbrae Primary School, Fairlie Primary School, and Skelmorlie Primary School. Children from West Kilbride, Beith and Renfrewshire can also attend Largs Academy by placement request.

=== Head Teachers ===
As of January 2020 the new Headteacher is John Docherty. The previous Headteacher, Heather Burns, retired at the end of the first term of the 2019/2020 session after seven years as Headteacher.

Name	Period
Mr H. McGhee	1970–1974
Mr W. Inglis	1974–1994
Mr G. Maxwell	1994–2003
Mr A. Jones	2003–2012
Mrs H. Burns	2012–2019
Mr B. Wilson	2019
Mr J. Docherty	2020–present

== History ==
=== Bus Crash ===
During a school trip to Barcelona 27 June 2002, a coach that was carrying a party of students and teachers from Largs Academy, crashed on the A6 motorway link road at Bierre-les-Semur, near Dijon, France at about 4 am BST.

Two pupils and four teachers were hospitalised with serious injuries, with at least five others suffering minor injuries. One of the injured teachers lost an arm as the bus rolled. One life was also lost in the crash, Katherine Fish, who was a 4th year student at the school.

After the crash, a memorial plaque was put up in the Old Largs Academy Music Department in memory of Katherine.

=== Largs Campus ===
Largs Academy and surrounding schools St Mary's RC Primary School and amalgamated Brisbane and Kelburn Primary School as Largs Primary, as well as a new nursery, will be accommodated in a new £50m campus, aimed to be complete by early 2018, allowing the previous school locations to be used for housing. North Ayrshire Council approved the proposals following a pre-determination meeting was held to give objectors and all stakeholders involved in the process a chance to make representation. The facility provides an environment for learning for 1200 Secondary school pupils, 210 denominational primary pupils, 610 non-denominational Primary pupils and 100 Early Years places, as well as core leisure and community provision to the surrounding area due to a partnership with SportsScotland.

The campus' construction was completed in March 2018, with the schools transferring into the new building at the end of the 2018 Easter break. The Largs Campus is the current site in use for Largs Academy, Largs Primary, St. Mary's Primary and Largs Early Years Centre as of 2020.

== Pupils ==
- Colin Birss – a judge of the High Court of Justice of England and Wales.
- Abby Kane – Silver medalist winner for backstroke at 2016 Paralympic games.
- Creag Little – Footballer.
- Kevin McKay (musician) – Scottish DJ, electronic musician, record label owner and record producer.
- Ryan Moir – theatre director and performer.
- Daniela Nardini – Scottish actress
