= Skelmorlie Castle =

Castle in North Ayrshire, Scotland

- Skelmorlie, North Ayrshire, Scotland; UK
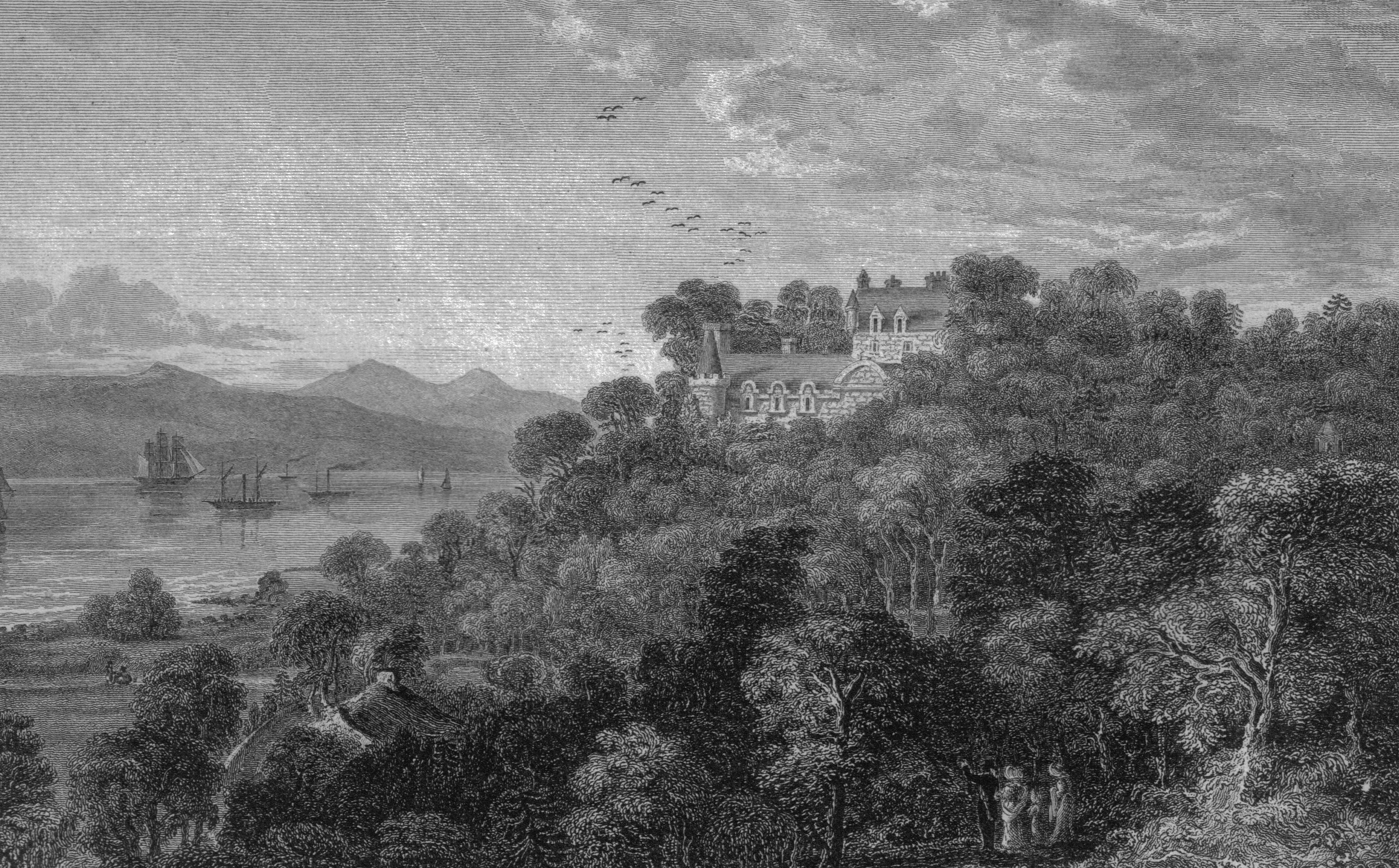
- Skelmorlie Castle in 1829

Site information
- Type: Scottish Tower House
- Open to the public: No
- Condition: in excellent repair

Location
- Shown within Scotland
- Location within Scotland
- Coordinates: 55.8520°N 4.8847°W
- Grid reference: NS 19524 65838

Site history
- Built: end 15th/early 16th century
- Built by: George Montgomerie, First of Skelmorlie
- In use: Private dwelling in routine use
- Materials: Red Sandstone block & rubble

Skelmorlie Castle stands on the eastern shore of the Firth of Clyde, Scotland, at the north-western corner of the county of Ayrshire. The structure dates from 1502, and was formerly the seat and stronghold of the Montgomery Clan. The modern village of Skelmorlie lies to the north of the castle.

== History ==
The name is given as 'North Skelmoirluy' on Robert Gordon's map of 1636–52; 'Skelmurly' on John Adair's map of 1685; and 'Skelmorly' on William Roy's map of 1745–47. The origin of the name may be 'shelter leeside of the great rock' and 'Skel-' may be equivalent to 'Skeir' and 'Skerries.'

=== The Cunninghame family ===
During the reign of Robert III (1390–1406) the lands of Skelmorlie were held by the Cunninghames of Kilmaurs; in about 1460 the northern portion passed into the hands of the Montgomeries as Skelmorlie-Montgomerie, the remainder continuing as Skelmorlie-Cunninghame. Anne, sister of Alexander de Montgomerie married a Cunninghame of Kilmaurs and this may explain the division of the lands.

=== The Montgomerie family ===
==== The Lairds or Barons ====
On 6 June 1461 Sir Alexander de Montgomerie of Ardrossan, the first Lord Montgomerie, granted the lands of Skelmorlie to his second son by Margaret Boyd (daughter of Sir Thomas Boyd of Kilmarnock), George, thereby was the founder of the cadet branch, the Montgomeries of Skelmorlie. George was also granted the lands of Lochliboside, Hartfield, and Colpy in the Barony of Renfrew. Another view is that Skelmorlie Castle was built by a brother of Hugh, the first Earl of Eglinton. This Hugh was the son of the second Lord Montgomerie and the grandson of the first Lord Montgomerie. John was the second laird and he married Marion Dalzel, by whom he had a son, Cuthbert, the third laird. Cuthbert married Elizabeth, daughter of Patrick Houston of that Ilk and their eldest son George became the fourth laird. George married Lady Catherine Montgomerie, youngest daughter of Hugh, first Earl of Eglinton. They had a large family and the eldest, Thomas, became the fifth laird. Thomas died in 1566 and his brother Robert inherited Skelmorlie, as well as Lochransay, Synnock, and Lochliboside.

Robert Montgomerie, seventh laird, was knighted by James VI and in 1628 created a baronet by Charles I. He was the son of another Robert; his mother was Dorothy, daughter of Lord Sempill. This Sir Robert married Margaret, daughter of Sir William Douglas of Drumlanrig.

The sixth laird, Robert, murdered Alexander Cunninghame, commendator of Kilwinning Abbey at his castle and palace of Montgreenan in 1586, following the murder, by the Cunninghames, of the fourth Earl of Eglinton. The elder Sir Robert and his eldest son were killed in revenge by Patrick Maxwell of Newark Glasgow.

==== The Baronets ====
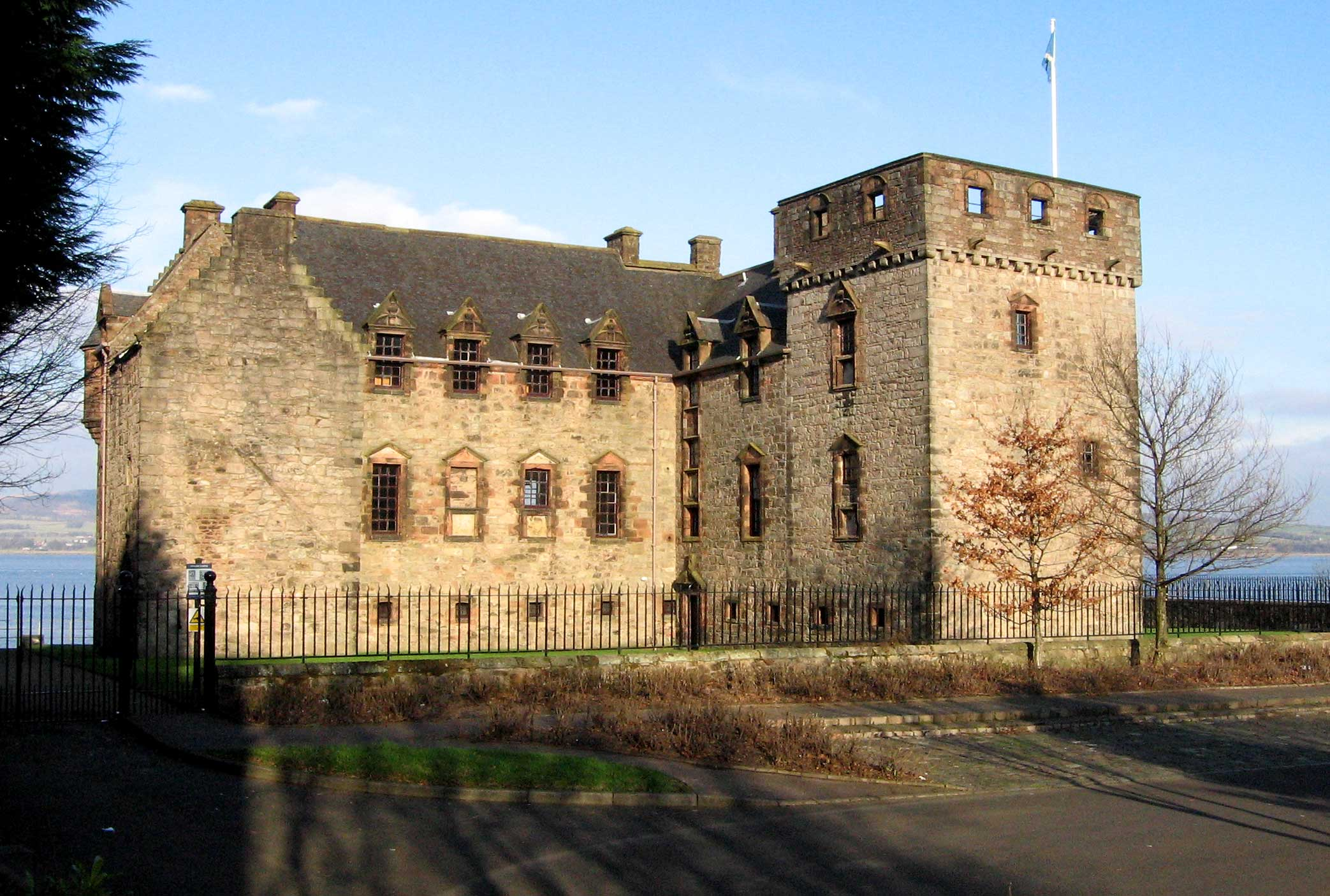
Newark Castle, Port Glasgow.

Sir Robert, the seventh laird and first baronet, was one day discovered by Patrick Maxwell in Newark Castle; presumably also bent on revenge for his father and brother. Patrick is recorded as saying Come down Robin, out o' that corner, come down, man, to me, who did you so good a turn as to make you young laird and auld laird o' Skelmorlie in one day. Patrick and Sir Robert in fact became friends. Sir Robert married Margaret, daughter of Sir William Douglas of Drumlanrig. She was a famous beauty and the subject of ballads by Alexander Montgomerie of Hessilhead.

The third baronet and ninth laird, Sir Robert, married Antonia, co-heiress of Sir James Scott of Rossie in Fife, by whom he had four sons and four daughters. This lady was an ardent covenanter and her husband was repeatedly fined for her attendance at conventicles. Robert died in 1685 and was succeeded by his son James. They had seven sons and four daughters.

Sir James, fourth baronet and tenth laird, was a member of the 1689 Parliament and Convention, like his father Robert. It is recorded that his mother wrote in 1684, severely chastising him for not providing for her and her four fatherless children. He was one of those chosen to administer the oath (the offer of the Crown) to King William and Queen Mary in London. He was dissatisfied with his reward of Lord Justice-Clerk and become a supporter of the deposed King James II, joining him at St Germains in France; despite this support Sir James, a Protestant, was not fully welcome by the Catholic King James and despite a promise to create him Earl of Ayr, he died, of 'vexation', in September 1694 in London. He had married Lady Margaret Johnston, daughter of a co-conspirator, the Earl of Annandale They had two sons, Robert the elder and William.

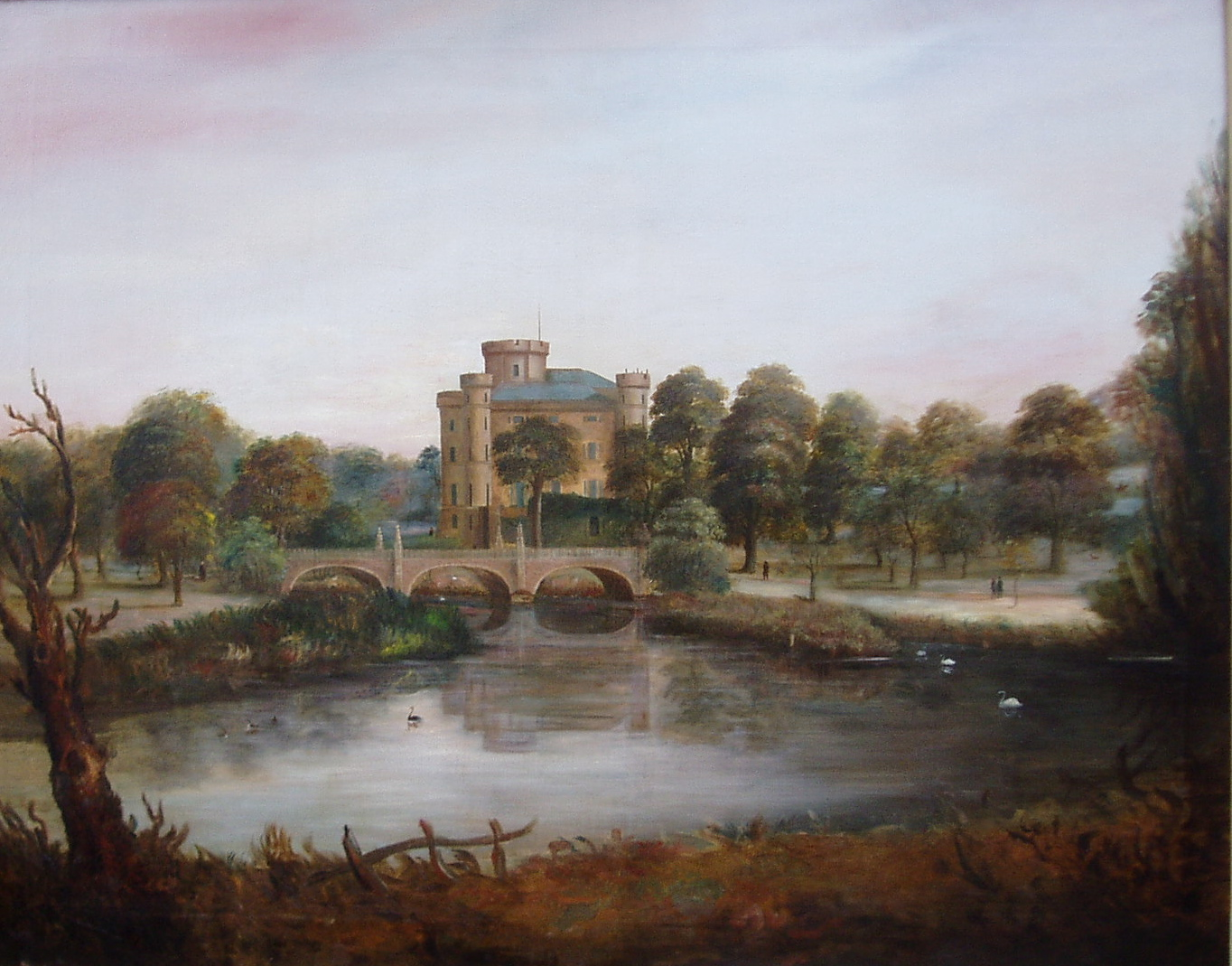
Eglinton Castle, built by the 12th Earl of Eglinton.

The Lord Provost of Glasgow, Hugh Montgomerie of Busbie, purchased the estate from the fourth baronet; taking possession in 1731 and inheriting the title as 6th baronet and eleventh laird. In 1687 he married Lilias Gemmel, daughter of Peter Gemmel, merchant in Glasgow and Christian Boyd his wife. Hugh was one of the commissioners appointed to negotiate the union with England, serving as a member of Scotland's last parliament. He was appointed to the first parliament of the United Kingdom as the representative for Glasgow. Hugh died in 1735 without issue and being the last direct descendant, the title became extinct.

The Skelmorlie estate passed to the 4th baron's daughter, Lilias, who married Alexander Montgomerie of Coilsfield. Lilias's son Hugh became the 12th Earl of Eglinton and his brother held the property of Annick Lodge. Lilias had five sons and three daughters and died in 1783, a few weeks before her husband. She sold her lands in Renfrewshire and purchased lands contiguous with Skelmorlie.

==== Heraldry ====
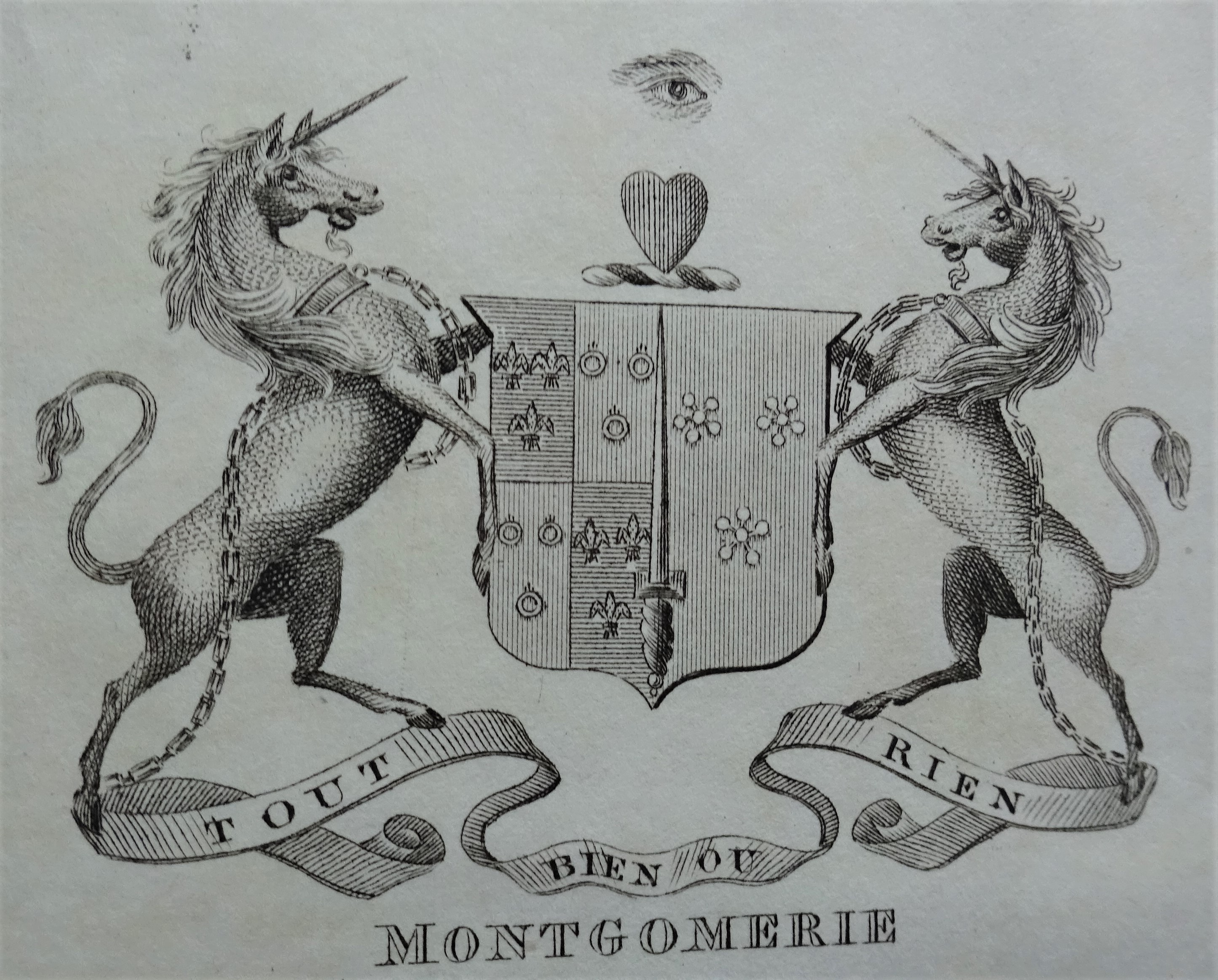
The arms and supporters of Montgomerie of Skelmorlie

Arms – Montgomerie of Skelmorlie are the combined arms of Montgomerie (quarterly, first and fourth on blue, with three fleur de lis in gold) and Eglinton (quarterly, second and third on red, three gold rings with each with a gem stone. A white sword, point downwards, in the middle of the quarters.) Crest – a heart with an eye over it. Motto – Tout bien ou rein (everything well (done) or nothing (attempted))

==== Skelmorlie Aisle ====
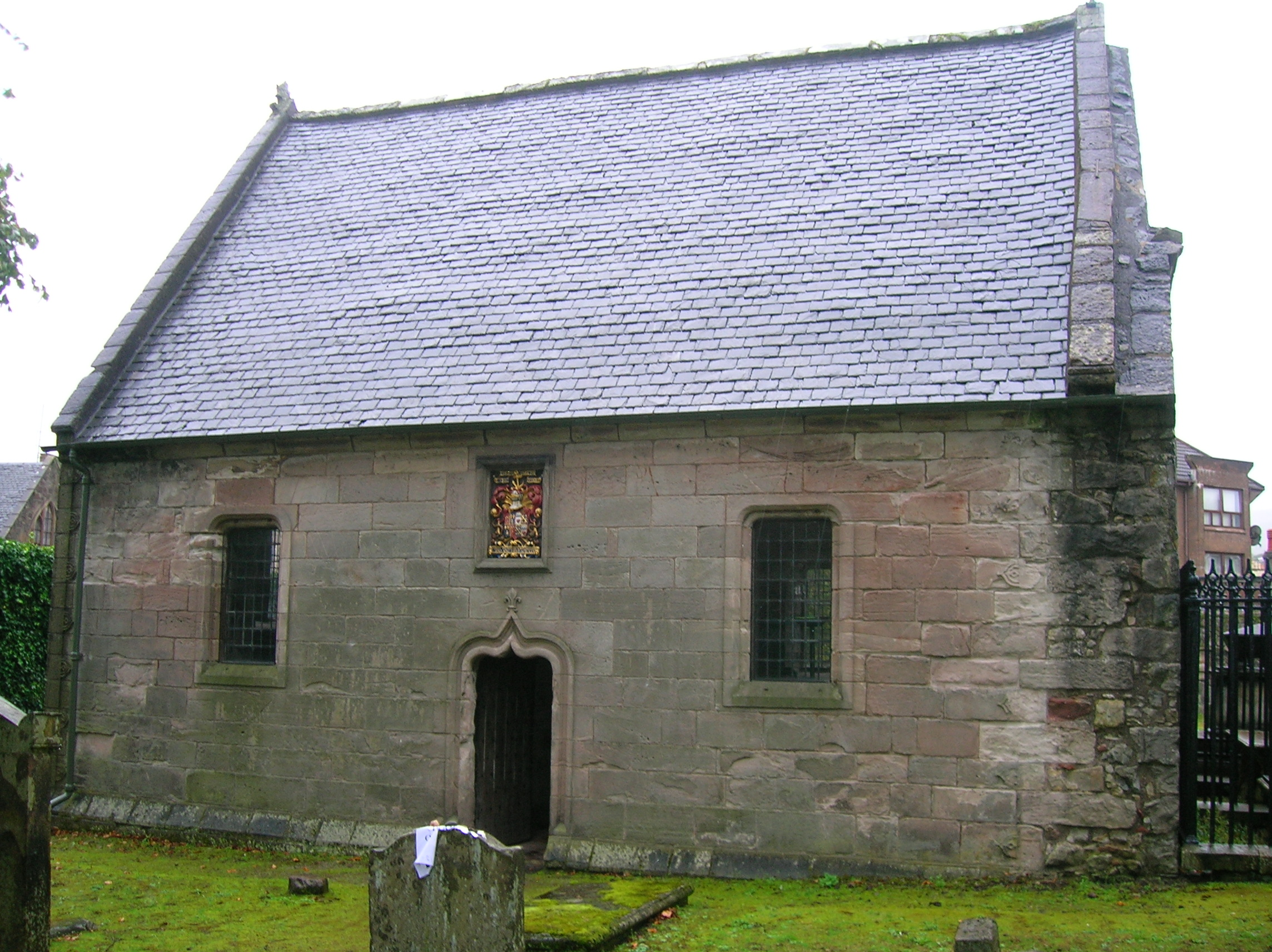
The Skelmorlie Aisle, Largs.

The ornate tomb in the Skelmorlie Aisle at Largs was built by Sir Robert Montgomerie of Skelmorlie, as a resting place and memorial to his beautiful wife Margaret Douglas, killed in a riding accident; kicked by her horse, following a fall in public at the Colm Fair. Her presence was said to haunt Skelmorlie Castle, but reputedly the presence left after the fire of 1959. Sir Robert is also interred at the aisle in a lead coffin. A third coffin within the tomb is said to be that of Sir Hugh Montgomerie of Eaglesham, a hero of the Battle of Otterburn.

Sir Robert is said to have carried out many acts of charity and mortification of his person following a change of character following his wife's death. He spent many nights praying for his salvation in the vault. His lead coffin carries the inscription (translated from the Latin) – I was dead before myself; I anticipated my proper funeral; alone, of all mortals, following the example of Caesar. This Caesar was Charles V who had his obsequies carried out before his death. This unusual inscriptions may be explained by his habit of praying alone in the burial vault for excessively long periods of time, as if he was already 'dead' and occupying his tomb.

A story is told of a local warlock bringing the Devil along with him to do a mischief to Sir Robert, however the laird was deep in prayer as usual and the Devil was forced to give up on his evil intent.

A stylised view of Skelmorlie Castle is seen in one of the painted panels on the ceiling of the aisle.

=== The castle and grounds ===
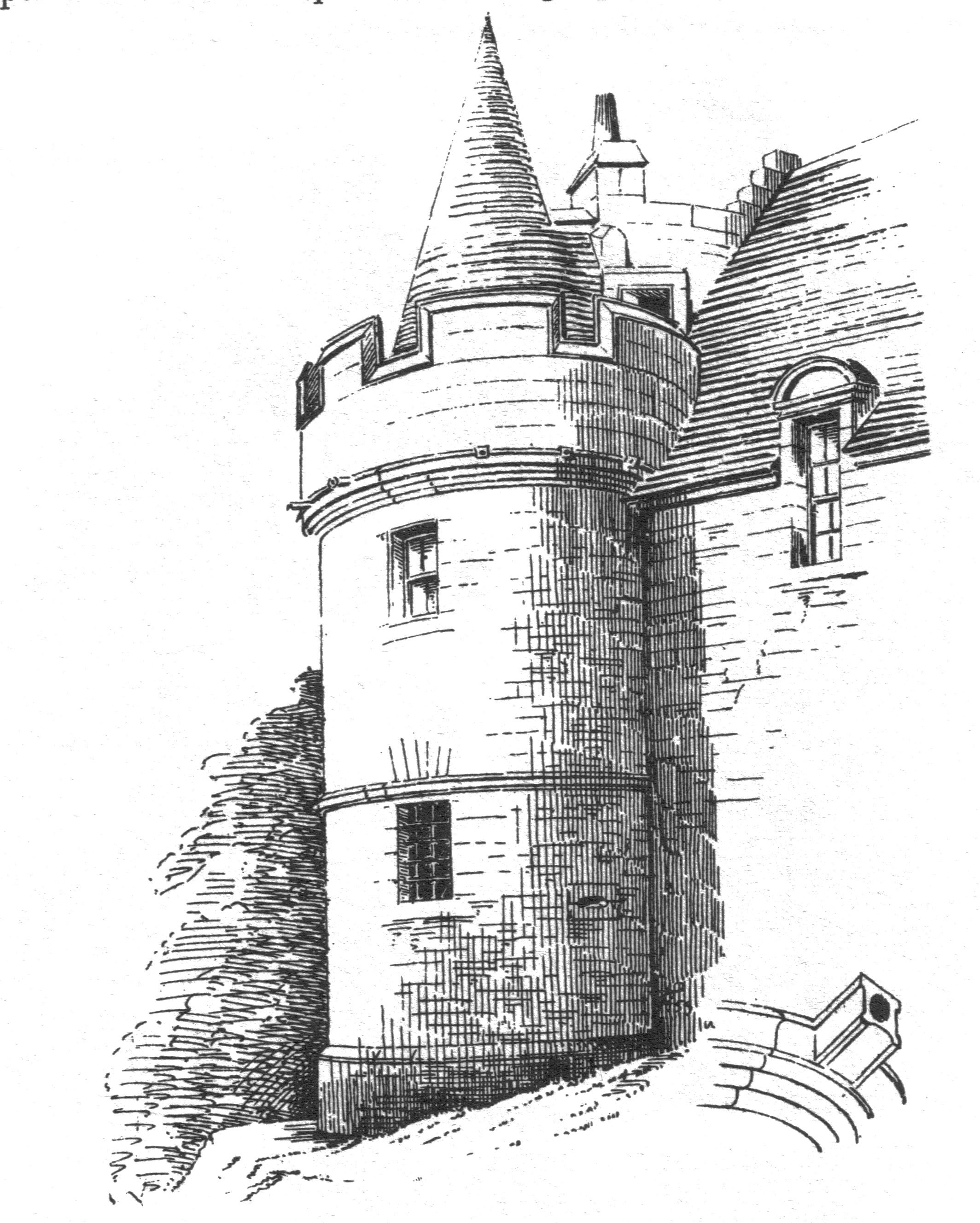
The castle from the southeast in the 1880s.

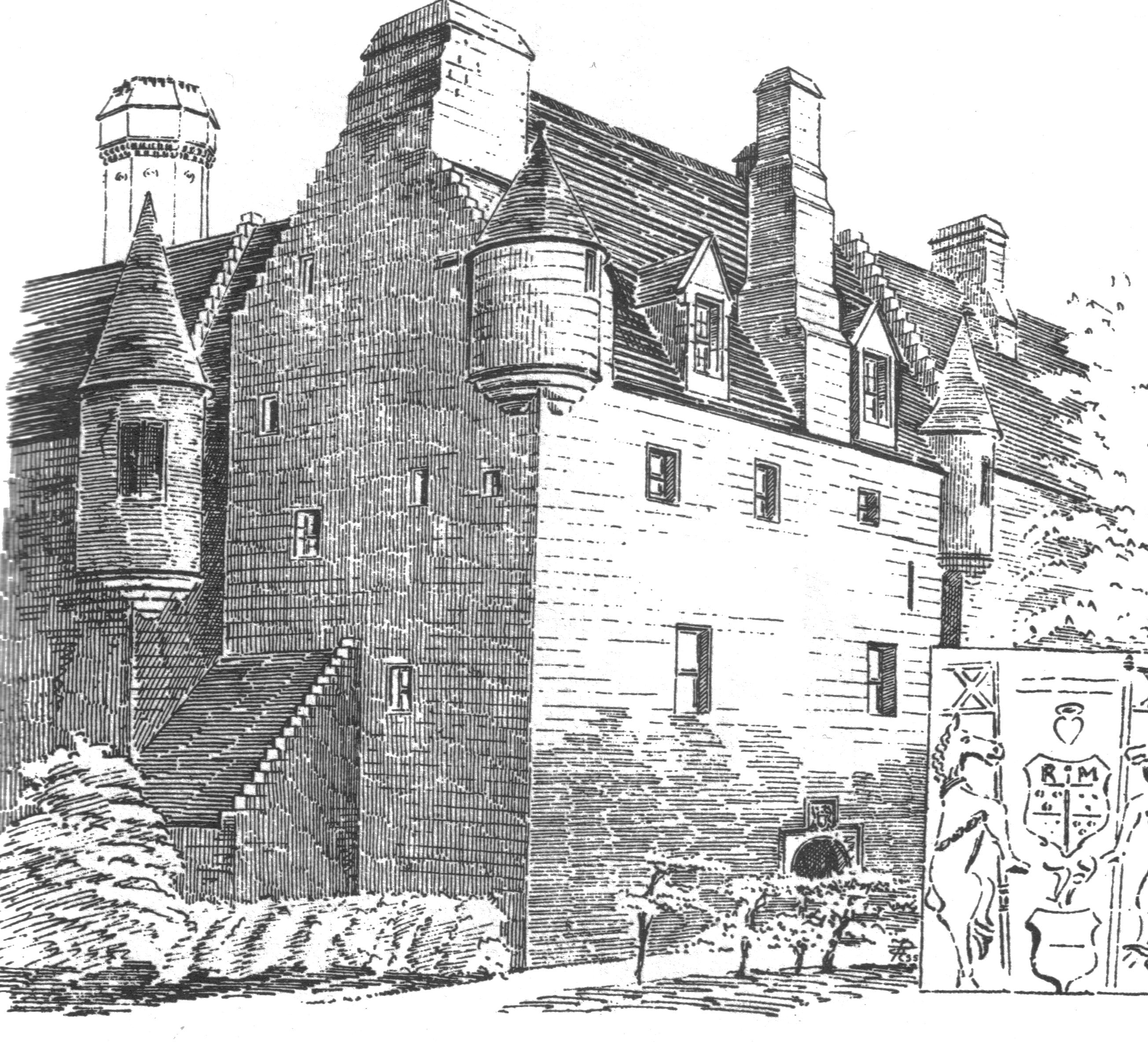
The castle frontage from the northeast in the 1880s.

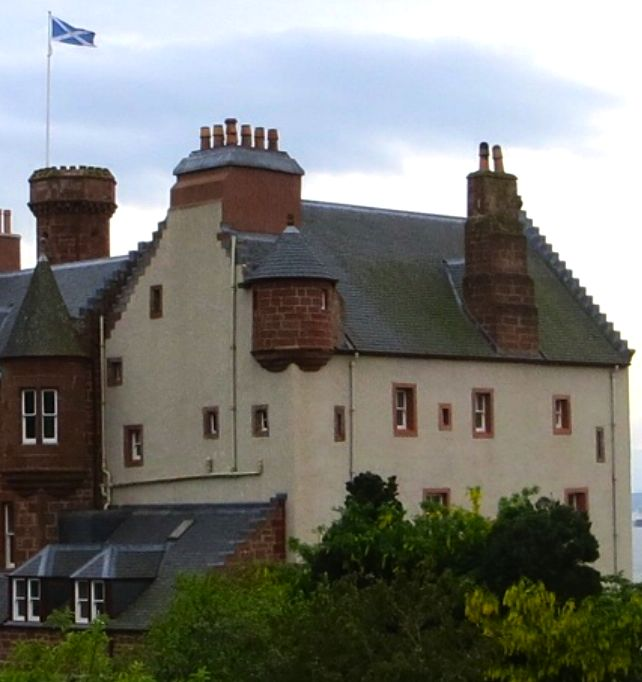
The frontage from the northeast, 2014.

The original Skelmorlie Castle may have stood on a motte which is situated in a defensive position on a promontory on ground lying between a small burn and the Skelmorlie Water at NS 213 660.

The oldest portion of the present day castle was built in 1502 and added to in 1636, when corbelling and parapets were removed, whilst angle turrets, later roofed, were added. Timothy Pont in his survey of Cunninghame around the year 1600 describes Skelmorlie Castle as "a fair well built house. It is certainly, in point of situation, a very pleasant and most delightful place, with its old-fashioned gardens, terrace and shrubbery. The view from it over the Firth of Clyde, to the opposite islands of Bute, Arran and Cumbraes, is not to be surpassed in picturesque scenery by any prospect in Britain". The baronial hall was on the first floor and as a more modern day dining room it had the Montgomerie coat of arms on the roof with the date 1762. The castle chapel, converted in the 19th century to stables and servants' quarters, still stands at the western side of the southern courtyard. Sir Robert's 17th range survives in part.

Skelmorlie tower is very similar in dimensions and internal arrangements to those towers at Little Cumbrae, Fairlie, and Law.

The grounds in the early 19th century are described as "beautifully laid out, and covered with rich and luxuriant woods. The principal disadvantage of this fine old mansion, as a modern residence, is certainly the difficulty of ascent to it, from the steepness of the hill on which it stands; but otherwise an agreeable, nay, delightful summer retreat." In the 1855 OS survey a bowling green and a sundial, possibly a Scottish sundial, are shown. The old baronial mill still exists in the name 'Milnburn' close to the Skelmorlie Water and Skelmorlie Mains is marked.

The silhouette of the keep has remained largely unchanged for over five centuries. This red sandstone rubble construction was rough-cast harled in the early 1960s following a fire in 1959, which burnt out the upper floors of the keep and of the west wing. The wing was demolished and the keep restored; the architects were Noad and Wallace of Glasgow.

Historic Scotland listed Skelmorlie Castle and the separate subsidiary buildings (17th Century Turret House and former Chapel, and Victorian Mews) on the south side of the southern courtyard as "Category B" in 1971.

==== Occupants since the 19th century ====
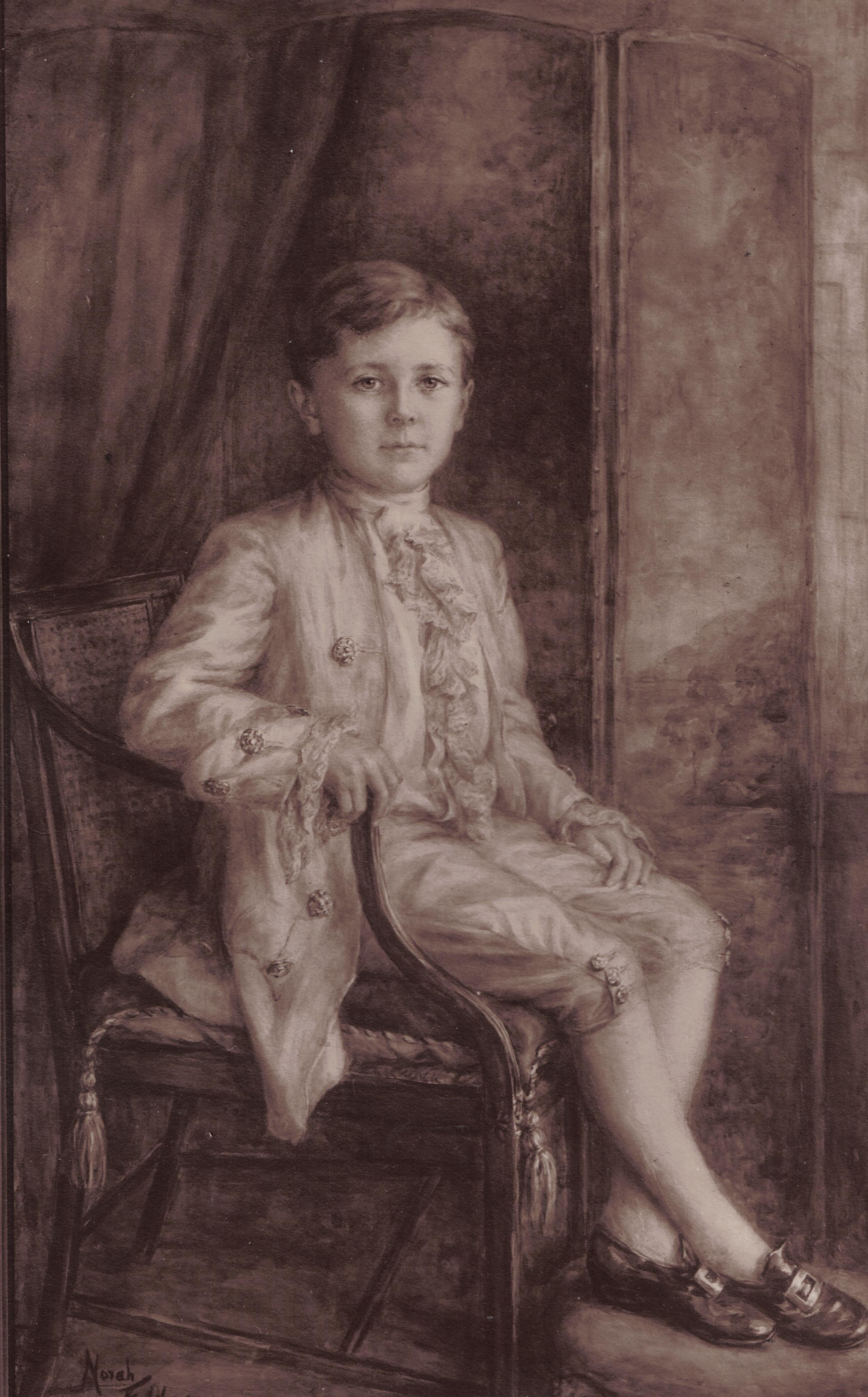
Archibald William in 1921, the first Earl to have inherited the title whilst dwelling at Skelmorlie Castle.

Major-General James Montgomerie, of Wrighthill, M.P. for Ayrshire lived at the castle for a long period in the early 19th century, being the brother of the 12th earl and grand-uncle to the 13th earl. During this time the castle remained as a little altered, but run down example of a tower castle.

The castle was tenanted during the period 1852 to 1890 by John Graham (1797–1886) of Glasgow, a textile and Port wine merchant (W. & J. Graham & Co. of Oporto established 1820), who was also a great patron of the Arts with an outstanding collection. He rebuilt the castle in 1856 by restoring the old tower at his own expense, and adding the mansion house which joined two old buildings, with the permission of the Earl of Eglinton. His architect was William Railton of Kilmarnock.

The 16th Earl of Eglinton moved here from the abandoned Eglinton Castle Montgomerie family seat in the mid-1920s, but it was sold by the 18th Earl of Eglinton, having been leased to the Wilson family since 1956. The 16th Earl died at Skelmorlie Castle in 1945. The castle became the property of the Wilson family in the mid-1970s, also the owners of the meat canning factory at Eglinton Castle, Kilwinning.

The castle was advertised for sale in 2007 and passed to new private owners in the summer of 2009.

== Archaeology ==
The RCAHMS record that a stone axe, about inches long, was found in a field at Skelmorlie (NS 19 67) and is now preserved in the Hunterian Museum, Glasgow. A 'Judge's Mound', a possible Moot hill existed at the top of the Shaw Glen.

=== The Serpent Mound ===
Near to the castle at Meigle is a 100-foot-high artificial mound, said to have been the site of Sun and serpent worship. A Dr Phenè discovered this structure, and excavations revealed a paved platform shaped like a segment of a circle, together with many bones and charcoal. The mound itself may well be entirely natural; however, the paved platform is a genuine artifact; it is not listed by the relevant authorities.

== Micro-history ==
In 1666 the feu duties payable on the lands of Ormescheoch (Armsheugh) held by the Laird of Skelmorlie were £00 16s 08d.
