= Largs Campus =

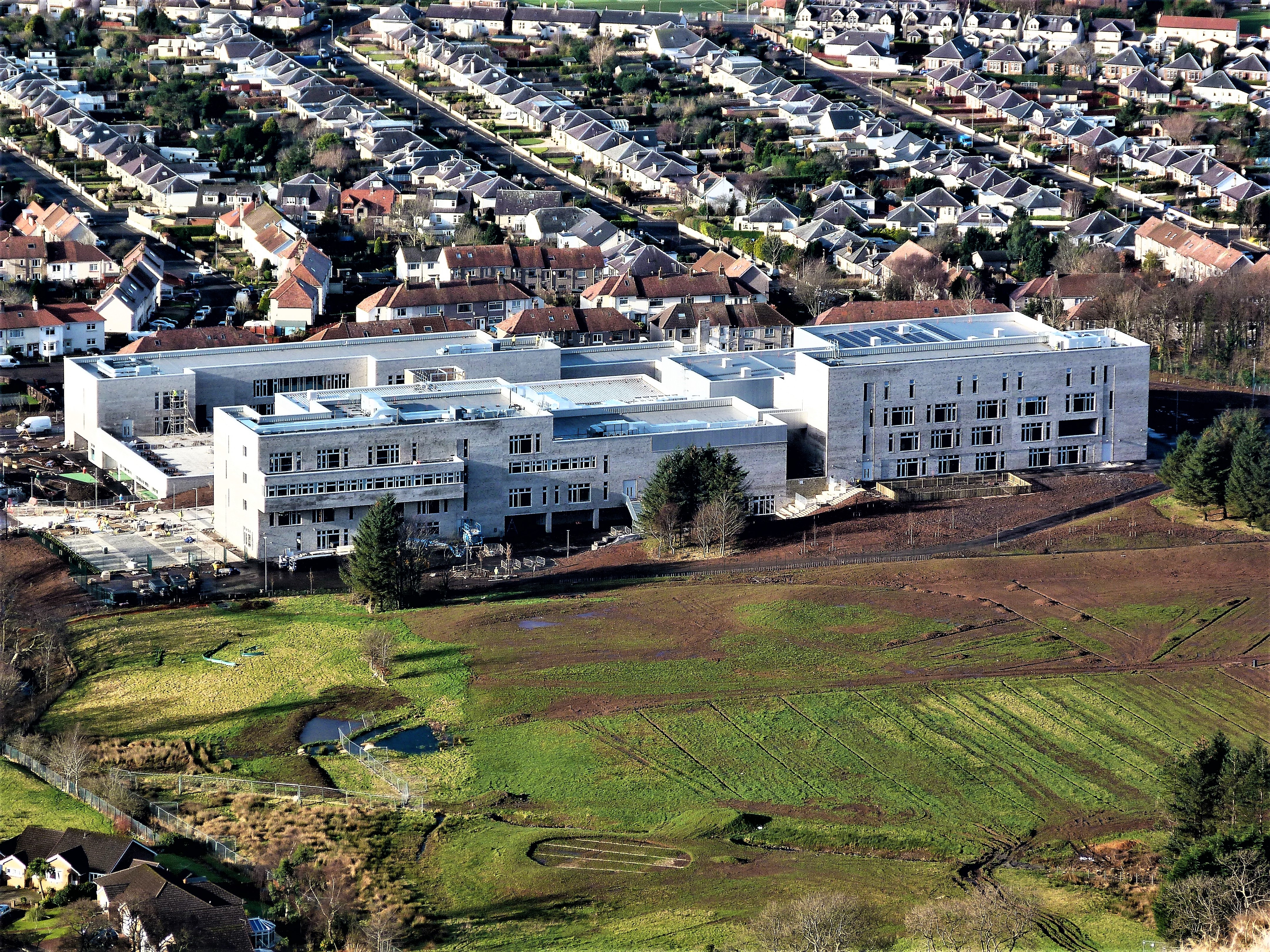
- Largs Campus whilst still under construction (2018)

Location
- Alexander Avenue; Largs, North Ayrshire, KA30 9DR; Scotland

Information
- Type: Nursery, Primary School, Secondary School
- Established: March 2018
- Head teacher: Largs Academy: John Doherty; Largs Primary: Kirsty Carson; St Mary's Primary: Stephanie Fisher; Largs Early Years: Alicia Train
- Gender: Mixed
- Age: 3 to 18
- Enrollment: 2,120
- Website: Largs Academy
- Website: Largs Primary

Largs Campus is an amalgamation of Secondary, Early Years and Primary schools which includes; Largs Academy, Largs Primary School, St Mary's Primary School and Largs Early Years Centre.

It opened in March 2018, serving the towns of Largs, Fairlie, Skelmorlie and the island of Cumbrae, the academy takes placement requests from across Scotland, from places such as West Kilbride, Beith and Renfrewshire. The campus is in partnership with SportsScotland, providing what is believed to be the largest Fitness and Sports gym in the United Kingdom.

== Early years ==
Work on the Campus began in August 2016 with a budget of £52 million in partnership with North Ayrshire Council, Hub South West and Morrison Construction. The state of the art facility will support more than 2,000 students ranging from age 3 to 18, merging Brisbane and Kelburn Primary into Largs Primary as well as including St Mary's Primary School, Largs Academy and an Early Years Nursery.

Largs Primary, St Mary's Primary and Early Years nurseries moved into the new Campus on 12 March 2018, with Largs Academy moving on 18 April 2018.

== The Academy departments ==
The Academy has 2 main buildings, the North Building and South Building. The North Building houses the Art, Modern Languages & RE, Social Subjects, English, Drama, PE and Drama The south building houses Maths, Home economics, Design & Technology Business Computing Science and the school offices.

== Feeder schools ==
Largs Campus’ feeder schools are Cumbrae Primary School, Fairlie Primary School, Largs Primary, St Mary's Primary and Skelmorlie Primary School.
