= William Smith (minister) =

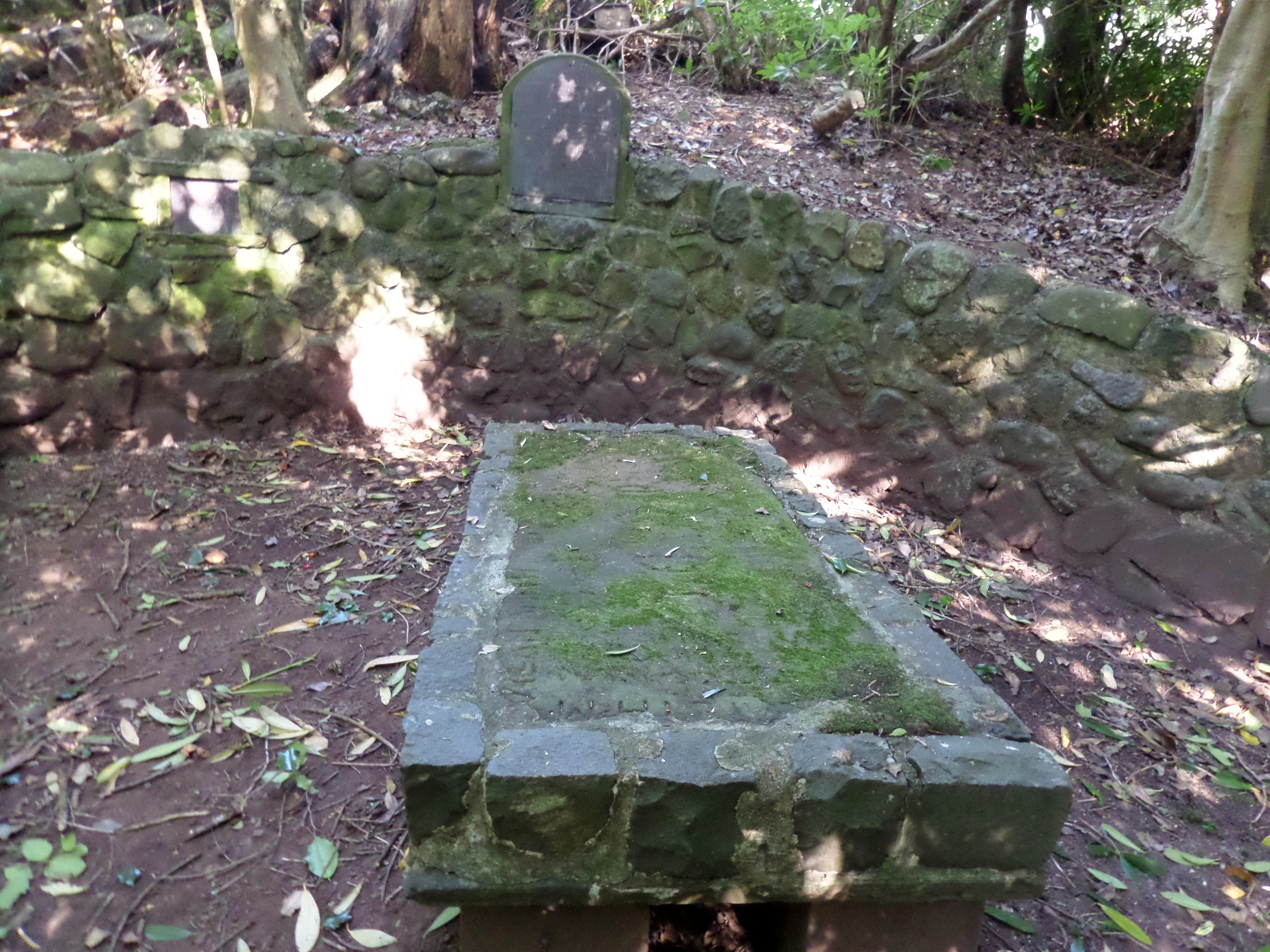
- The 'Prophet's Grave'
- Died: 28 September 1647; Middleton Farm, Largs, Scotland
- Occupation: Minister of the Church of Scotland

The Reverend William Smith died aged 28 from the plague in 1647, possibly from Typhoid Fever and was buried at a site that has become known as the Prophet's Grave, Minister's Grave or Smith's Grave (NS 2125 6226) in the Brisbane Glen near Largs, North Ayrshire, Scotland.

== Life and character ==
Succeeding Thomas Craig, a gifted preacher, pious and sociable, William was inducted to minister at Largs in 1644 and had been a schoolmaster in Irvine and/or Kilwinning (1641). Hugh Smith, minister of Eastwood, was the younger brother of William. He never married and records show that he died with very few possessions, just his books and his clothes. His education had been at the University of Glasgow where he had graduated in 1639 with a Master of Arts degree.

Such was his dedication that he continued to minister to his parishioners even after he had contracted the plague. In times past many diseases were thought to be more of an act of God than a result of contact with micro-organisms as their existence at that time was unknown. William Smith ministering to his flock whilst suffering from the 'plague' must be seen in this context as the power of prayer was sincerely believed to be capable of healing the sick. It wasn't until 1875 that Robert Koch demonstrated that disease was caused by micro-organisms that were too small to be seen by the naked eye.

== The pestilence ==
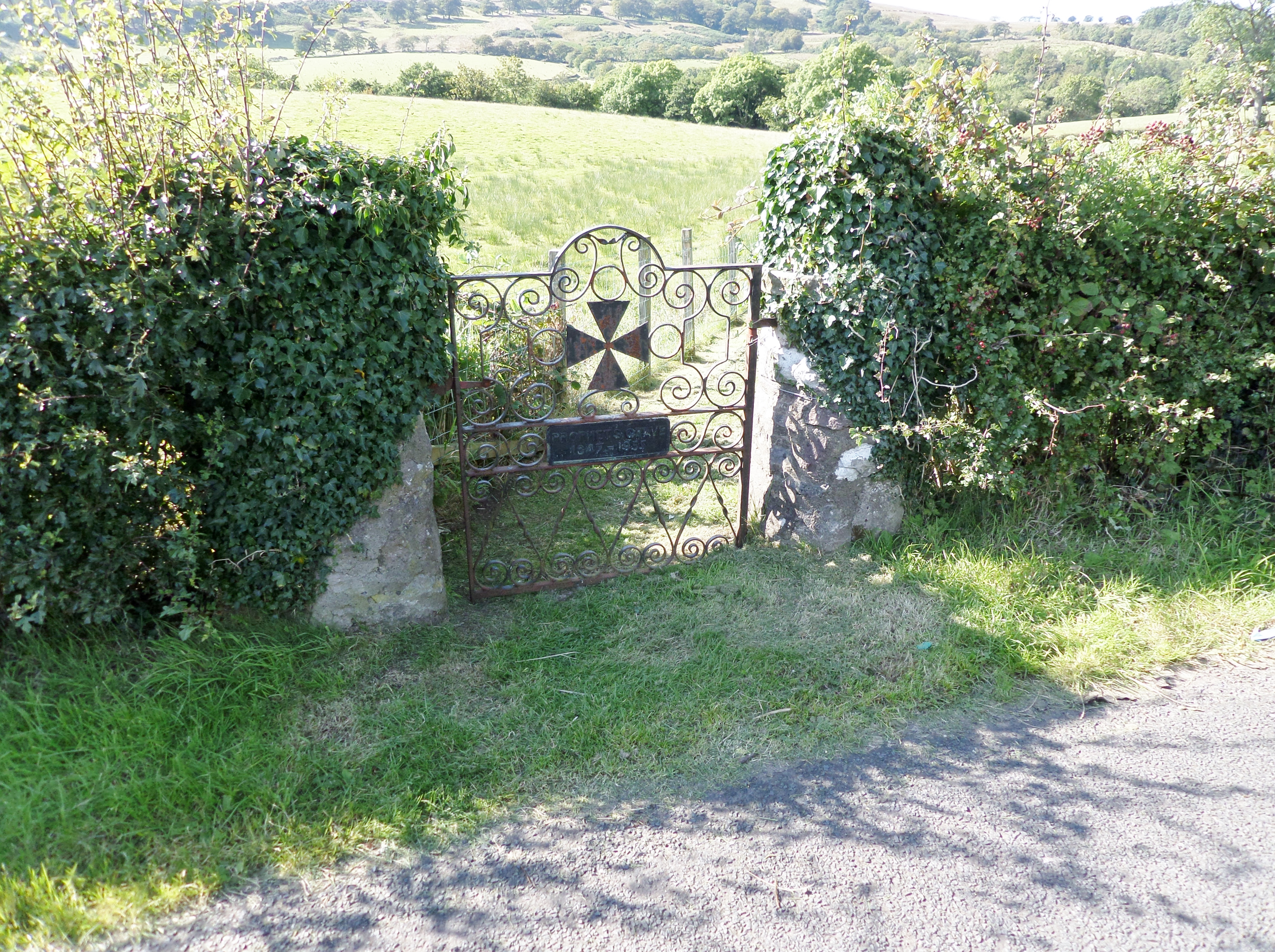
The entry to the Prophet's Grave site

The Reverend William Smith had been the minister in the then village of Largs for only three years when he died, aged about 28 years of age, at Middleton in the Brisbane Glen whilst tending to his flock who had moved to nearby Outerwards and then built temporary dwellings in this secluded site in the hope of escaping the pestilence or plague that was in all probability Typhus. Considerable help was organised at the time by the Irvine Presbytery for the relief of the parishioners of Largs, with the active support from the Laird of Bishopton.

== The prophecy and the prophet's grave ==
The grave site now consists of a recumbent stone standing on stone blocks near the Middleton Burn that runs down to the Noddsdale Water in the vicinity of the old Noddsdale corn and flour mill. The old OS maps show that the path that now runs to the grave through what was a wind break of trees is of relatively recent origin and that the grave used to be reached via a path from Noddsdale Mill. The site was close to the old Brisbane Estate.

It is recounted that he became known as the 'Prophet' because upon his deathbed William Smith prophesied that if the two holly trees growing at his grave were prevented from touching then the plague or pestilence would never return to the parish of Largs. Older records indicate that the holly trees were located at the 'head' and 'foot' of the grave, however today (datum 2014) two trees are located either side of the 'head' and 'three' at the foot. The records show that relatives and others maintained the grave site and the result, intended or otherwise, of his prophecy is that the site has been maintained and his name has never been forgotten.

Asiatic Cholera came to Largs at least twice in the 1830s, however it is not recorded whether the holly trees were touching or maybe the 'Prophet' was specifically referring to typhoid fever.

The grave is located in a fairly remote location as was typical of burials of plague victims such as those who died from cholera. Many Cholera pits exist in Ayrshire, such as at Dalry, Stevenston, Monkcastle, Beith, Barrmill, Kilmarnock, Cleeve Cove, etc. It is unknown where those members of his flock who died from the plague are buried.

The original gravestone bore the following inscription:

Heir layeth M William Smith, minister of Larges, a faithful
minister of the gospell, removed by the pestilence 1647.
Conditus in tumulo hoc jaceo juvenisque senexque;
nempe annis juvenis, sed pietate senex, Divino eloquio,
coelestia dogmata vidi abstersi tenebras, mentibus, ore
tonans. Altoniloque haesit animo per vera malorum
colluvies, verbis improba facto meis. Renewed by James
Smith, his nephew, in the year 1710. Renewed 1760.;

The Latin inscription translates as -

"Buried in this tomb I lie, at the same time a youth and an old man – young in years and old in piety. By the divine spirit I have seen divine truths, and have dispersed darkness from the mind, thundering with loud voice. There cleaved to my feelings a very horror of wickedness, and to my words reproach of wicked deeds."

=== Restorations ===
The stone and later copy of the inscription records that the grave of 1647 was restored or 'renewed' by his nephew James Smith in 1710 and again in 1760. In 1942 the Revd Baxter had expressed a desire to have the grave site restored and enhanced, for at this time the original pillars had gone and the stone simply rested unevenly on a grass slope with no dedicated pathway running to it, making it hard to find. In 1956 Saint Columba's Parish Church and the Largs Business Club carried out an extensive restoration and on Sunday, 20 May the people of Largs, accompanied by the Provost, Burgh councillors and local clergy re-dedicated the grave site with prayers and psalms sung to 17th-century tunes. The cost was £372 6s 5d and a church elder, Alexander Hill, pulled back the saltire flag to reveal the new engraved plaque. Mr John Campbell of Auchengarth donated the land and Messrs. Blackie crafted the bespoke wrought iron gate with its stone piers built by Mr Alexander Campbell. Largs Town Council took on the responsibility for maintaining the site in good condition.

At one point the grave was much neglected and is said to have been little more than a marshy swamp. Being a popular place for holidaymakers to visit a number of postcards of the grave were produced and the earliest show that the stone was originally recumbent and set into the ground, however by 1905 it was raised up onto four stout stone pillars. Postcards show that the site was entirely remodelled in 1956 and the landscaping included the small bridge on the 'new' path, drystone dyking and planting of ornamental hedges, etc.

In August 2014 the Redburn Activity Agreement Group (RAAG) assisted by the NAC Ranger Service carried out a programme of vegetation removal so that William Smith's grave became more open and the five holly trees were not all touching. The ornamental iron gate at the roadside entrance was also sanded and repainted by RAAG in the same year.

== Aftermath ==
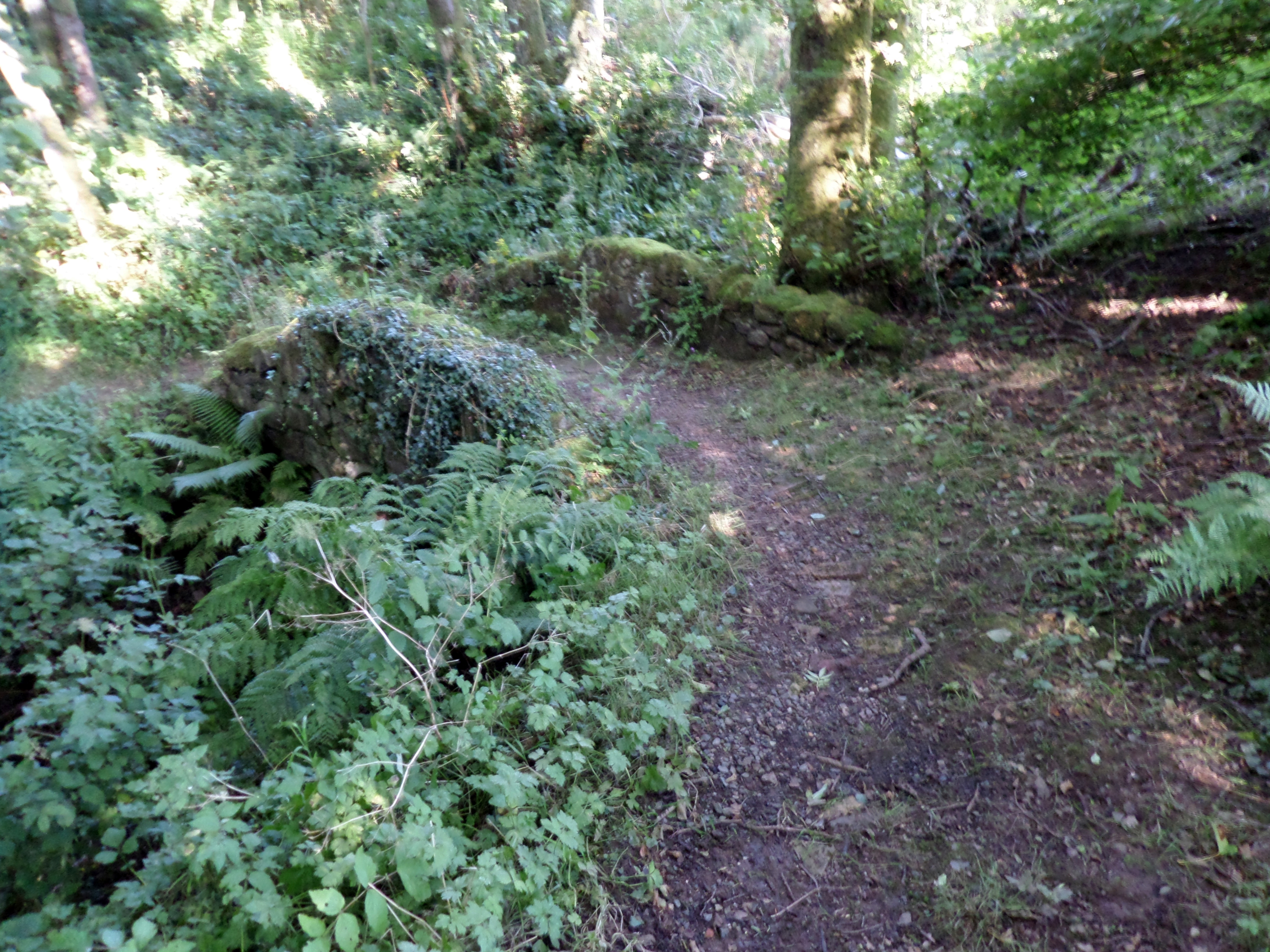
The bridge over the Middleton Burn on the 'new' path to the grave.

The presbytery of Irvine acted quickly following William Smith's death and the minutes for 28 September 1647 record that:

"The Presbiterie laying to heart the lamentable and calamitous condition of the paroch of Larges partly by the reason of the hand of God that is lying heavy upon them, and partly by the reason of the removal of their minister by death think it expedient that Mr Wm. Lyndsay be sent to visit them and to take notice of their desires, and to enquire ane overture of themselves how they may be gotten helpit and supplied, and the said Mr William to make report of his diligence."

Perhaps in his delirium the minister recalled pre-Christian beliefs for holly trees were thought to have protective qualities and even today the tree forms a major part of the Christmas festivities with its red berries and bright shiny green leaves that echo the energy of nature and of sacrifice, both within nature and of religion as reflected in Christmas Carols, etc.

== Tourist attraction ==
It is clear from old photographs and comments by William Dobie in 1855 that the grave was a very popular tourist attraction and had a regular stream of visitors who walked up to the site from the town.

== Micro-history ==
William Smith was somewhat lame in one foot.

The remains of several huts, found at Outerwards (NS 234 661) on the Noddle Burn may be those of the temporary dwellings of those who left Largs during the outbreak of pestilence.

Whilst renewing the inscription the date of Smith's death was accidentally given on the tombstone as 1644 instead of 1647. The presbytery records make it clear that Smith died between 29 June and 28 September 1647.

A Geocache located at the grave site has helped to bring more visitors to this location, which is not widely known.

The St Columba's Church Heritage Centre in Largs gives details of the life and works of William Smith.
