= Meigle, North Ayrshire =

Coordinates: 55.85240173°N 4.88388064°W

Meigle: Scots: Meagle
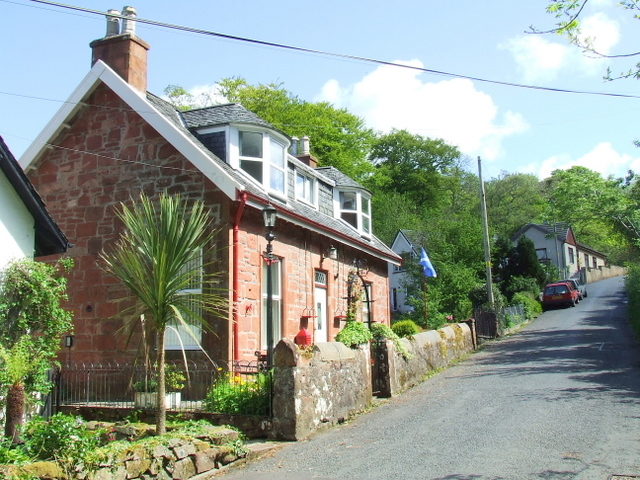
- The hamlet of Meigle

- Location within North Ayrshire
- OS grid reference: NS 1957 6589
- Council area: North Ayrshire
- Lieutenancy area: Ayrshire and Arran
- Country: Scotland
- Sovereign state: United Kingdom
- Post town: Largs
- Police: Scotland
- Fire: Scottish
- Ambulance: Scottish
- UK Parliament: North Ayrshire and Arran
- Scottish Parliament: Cunninghame North

Meigle or Meagle is a hamlet on the Meigle Burn in North Ayrshire, Parish of Largs, Scotland. The settlement lies close to the road to Greenock and is named after the bay where the Skelmorlie Burn flows into the Firth of Clyde. Meigle once stood on the old toll road from Largs to Greenock. It lies 41 m (135 ft) above sea level. Skelmorlie Castle and glen lie nearby. The Meigle Burn has its confluence with the Skelmorlie Burns to the east of Skelmorlie Bridge. The modern spelling 'Meigle' will be used for consistency. There is also a village called Meigle in Perth & Kinross.

== History ==
In the 1750s a mill stood close to the Meigle Burn and Skelmorlie Water, the mills presence surviving as the place-name 'Millburn'.

The first OS maps gives the spelling as 'Meagle'. In 1855-57 Meagle (sic) consisted of a cottage house and buildings leased by the late A.H.Campbell Esq from the Earl of Glasgow.

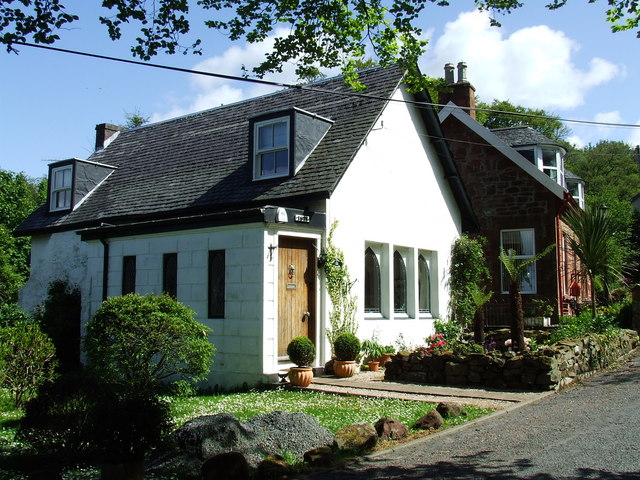
The old Meigle Chapel.

Meagle (sic) was an ordinary country school without an endowment, its costs being covered by voluntary Contributions and by the pupils parents. In 1855-57 Mr Lorgan was the teacher.

Meigle Bay is a small and shallow and lies in the Firth of Clyde in front of Skelmorlie Castle. It was a famous haunt of smugglers who found safe hiding places here in the Rocks, Caves and neighbourhood.

In 1876 a chapel was built, using the medium of mass concrete, as a gift from the Stewart sisters of Ashcraig House. It was converted and extended to become a private dwelling. A mission hall is shown on the OS map of 1909.

In 1855 a new road had been built close to the coast and Bridgend House and its grounds stand on the old toll road route. A bathing house is shown on the north side of the Skelmorlie Burn with a footpath leading to it. A school is also shown on the outskirts of the hamlet that served Meigle and the surrounding farms.

In 1909 the post office is no longer shown on OS maps, but a letter box is present as it still is. The school is also not indicated, however the boat house is marked. A mission hall is however still present.

=== Transport ===
The old road in the 1750s from Largs to Greenock via Inverkip used to run mainly inland, close to Skelmorlie Castle on its eastern side, crossing a rather narrow Bridge over Skelmorlie Water and then running further inland via Knock Castle to Largs, Irvine, etc. With the establishment of the coast road a new bridge was built over the Skelmorlie Water and the old bridge and that section of the old road became an entrance to Bridgend House. The 1832 Thomson's map shows the new coastal toll road with a new bridge at Meagle (sic) named Haining Bridge End.

=== The Serpent Mound ===
Above the hamlet lies the 'Serpent Mound', named after the curved shape of the earthwork. It is said to have been had connections with the cult of sun worship. Smith records that despite the serpentine shape it is a natural stratified structure formed from stratified deposits on the old raised beach eroded by streams that run on either side. A Dr Phenè discovered this structure and excavations revealed a paved platform shaped like a segment of a circle, together with many bones and charcoal. As stated, the mound itself may well be entirely natural; however, the paved platform is a genuine artifact; it is not listed by the relevant authorities.

=== Ashcraig House ===
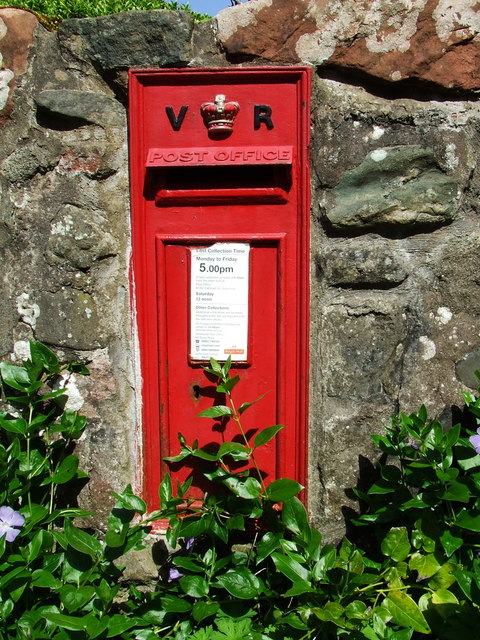
The Victorian letterbox

Ashcraig House on the Firth of Clyde had a boat house and a bathing house. Spacious formal gardens are overlooked by a circa 1840 pink stone marine villa.

== Etymology ==
The place-name Meigle in Perth and Kinross may be from the Old English for 'midge gill'. The Meigle hamlet in North Ayrshire that has links with the Scandinavian influences that are common on the west coast of Scotland, is thought to be derived from the Norse ' mjo gil' meaning 'narrow gill' or 'narrow opening'.

== Meigle Bay ==
One of the markers for the 'Arran Measured Mile' is located on the beach at Meigle. In the 19th century a boat house and bathing houses were located here.
