= Scotts Shipbuilding and Engineering Company =

Scottish shipbuilding company

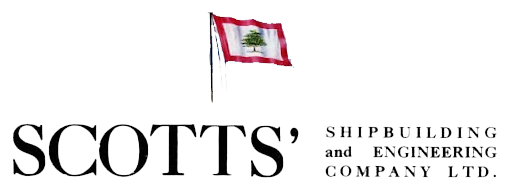
- Company type: Private
- Industry: Shipbuilding
- Founded: 1711
- Defunct: 1993
- Fate: Merged into Scott Lithgow (1967)
- Successor: Trafalgar House
- Headquarters: Greenock, Scotland
- Parent: Scott Lithgow (1967–1977); British Shipbuilders (1977–1983); Trafalgar House (1983–1993)
- Subsidiaries: Greenock Dockyard Co.

Scotts Shipbuilding and Engineering Company Limited, often referred to simply as Scotts, was a Scottish shipbuilding company based in Greenock on the River Clyde. In its time in Greenock, Scotts built over 1,250 ships.

== History ==
John Scott founded the company in 1711. He built herring busses and small craft. He was succeeded by his son William Scott (1722–1769) and another son. In 1765 they built their first square-rigged vessel. William's son John (1752–1837) expanded the shipyard to a major shipbuilding company.

The Scott family took over the Greenock Foundry in 1790. In 1791, Scott & Co. built Brunswick, of 624-ton (bm), for the Newfoundland trade. She and Caledonia, built in 1794, were the largest ships built in Scotland in their years. They marked the beginning of increased activity by Scott & Co., particularly with respect to large, ocean-going ships.

C. G. Scott started building at Cartsdyke Dockyard in 1850, as Scott & Company.

John Scott (II) and Robert Scott bought the adjacent yard of Robert Steele & Company in 1883, to create the Cartsburn Dockyard, which was laid out for naval shipbuilding. By 1900, John Swire & Company were major shareholders and Henry Scott was a director of Swire Scotts. In 1900–1901, he specified and oversaw construction of Swire's Taikoo Dockyard in Hong Kong.

In 1925, Scotts took over Ross & Marshall's Cartsdyke Mid Yard. In 1934, they exchanged their Cartsdyke East yard for Cartsdyke Mid yard with Greenock Dockyard Ltd. In June 1965, the Company took over Scott's & Sons (Bowling) Ltd, and in December 1965, Scott's merged with the Greenock Dockyard Company and the Cartsburn and Cartsdyke Dockyards were fully integrated in 1966. In 1967, the Company merged with Lithgows to form Scott Lithgow Ltd, operating as Scotts Shipbuilding Co (1969) Ltd. Scott Lithgow Ltd was absorbed into the nationalised British Shipbuilders in 1977.

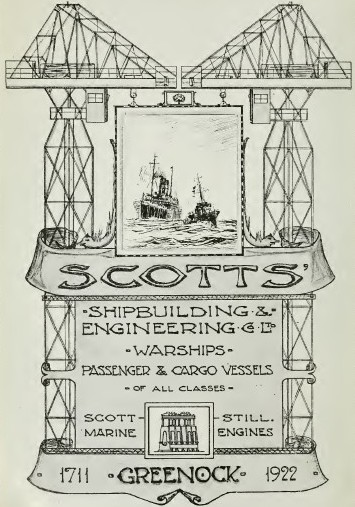
Advertisement in Brassey's Naval Annual, 1923

Cartsdyke Shipyard was closed in 1979 and Cartsburn in 1984. In 1983, the Scott Lithgow company and yards were sold to Trafalgar House. No further shipbuilding was undertaken and the 270-year-old Scott shipbuilding company finally ceased trading in 1993. Between 1988 and 1997, the Cartsburn and Cartsdyke shipyards were gradually demolished and redeveloped as insurance offices, computer warehouses and fast food restaurants.

In 2011, Greenock's McLean Museum and Art Gallery celebrated the tercentenary of Scotts' foundation.

== Notable ships ==
Notable vessels built included the early Royal Mail Steam Packet Company liners Clyde, Dee, Solway and Tweed in 1841, SS Thetis of 1857, which John Scott (1830–1903) financed himself to test his theory about high pressure steam in the compound engine, which worked at about 120 lb_{f}/in^{2} in Thetis, the early tanker Narragannsett in 1903, the barque Archibald Russell, the British S-class submarines, in 1914, the cruiser HMS Glasgow in 1937, and the drilling ship Ben Ocean Lancer in 1977.

Principal customers of Scotts were Alfred Holt & Co (Blue Funnel Line) (88 ships), The China Navigation Company / John Swire Ltd (95 ships - including MS Changsha and MS Taiyuan) and the Royal Navy (114 ships). Scotts Assistant Manager James Richardson devised an early "Snorkel" for submarines, for which they were granted British Patent No.106330 of 1917. It was not taken up by the Admiralty for use by the Royal Navy.

== In popular culture ==
Pictures of some Scotts-built vessels were painted by the Greenock marine artist William Clark. (Glasgow Museum of Transport). A painting of the launch in 1818 from Scotts yard of the wood ship Christian was painted by the Anglo-US marine artist Robert Salmon. (Glasgow Museum of Transport).
