= Swimming at the 2016 Summer Paralympics – Women's 100 metre backstroke S13 =

Women's 100 metre backstroke S13 at the XV Paralympic Games
- Venue: Olympic Aquatics Stadium
- Dates: 17 September 2016
- Competitors: 14 from 11 nations

Medalists
1st place, gold medalist(s)		Anna Stetsenko	Ukraine
2nd place, silver medalist(s)		Abby Kane	Great Britain
3rd place, bronze medalist(s)		Katja Dedekind	Australia

The women's 100 metre backstroke S13 event at the 2016 Paralympic Games took place on 17 September 2016, at the Olympic Aquatics Stadium. Two heats were held. The swimmers with the eight fastest times advanced to the final.

== Heats ==
=== Heat 1 ===
10:43 17 September 2016:

Rank	Lane	Name	Nationality	Time	Notes
1	4	Abby Kane	Great Britain	1:09.09	PR Q
2	3	Katja Dedekind	Australia	1:14.61	Q
3	5	Karina Petrikovicova	Slovakia	1:14.68	Q
4	6	Jenna Jones	Australia	1:15.62	Q
5	2	Marian Polo Lopez	Spain	1:16.41	
6	7	Naomi Ciorap	Romania	1:22.00	
7	1	Alani Ferreira	South Africa	1:24.60	

=== Heat 2 ===
10:47 17 September 2016:

Rank	Lane	Name	Nationality	Time	Notes
1	4	Anna Stetsenko	Ukraine	1:10.38	Q
2	5	Colleen Young	United States	1:13.44	Q
3	3	Sanne Hofman	Netherlands	1:15.00	Q
4	1	Anastasiya Zudzilava	Belarus	1:15.72	Q
5	2	Ariadna Edo Beltran	Spain	1:16.03	
6	6	Akari Kasamoto	Japan	1:17.98	
	7	Cailin Currie	United States		DSQ

== Final ==
19:00 17 September 2016:

Rank	Lane	Name	Nationality	Time	Notes
1st place, gold medalist(s)	5	Anna Stetsenko	Ukraine	1:08.30	PR
2nd place, silver medalist(s)	4	Abby Kane	Great Britain	1:09.30	
3rd place, bronze medalist(s)	6	Katja Dedekind	Australia	1:12.25	
4	3	Colleen Young	United States	1:12.93	
5	2	Karina Petrikovicova	Slovakia	1:14.61	
6	7	Sanne Hofman	Netherlands	1:14.70	
7	1	Jenna Jones	Australia	1:15.14	
8	8	Anastasiya Zudzilava	Belarus	1:16.32	
