= Barrfields Pavilion =

Theatre at Barrfields, Largs, North Ayrshire

Coordinates: 55°48′03″N 4°52′06″W

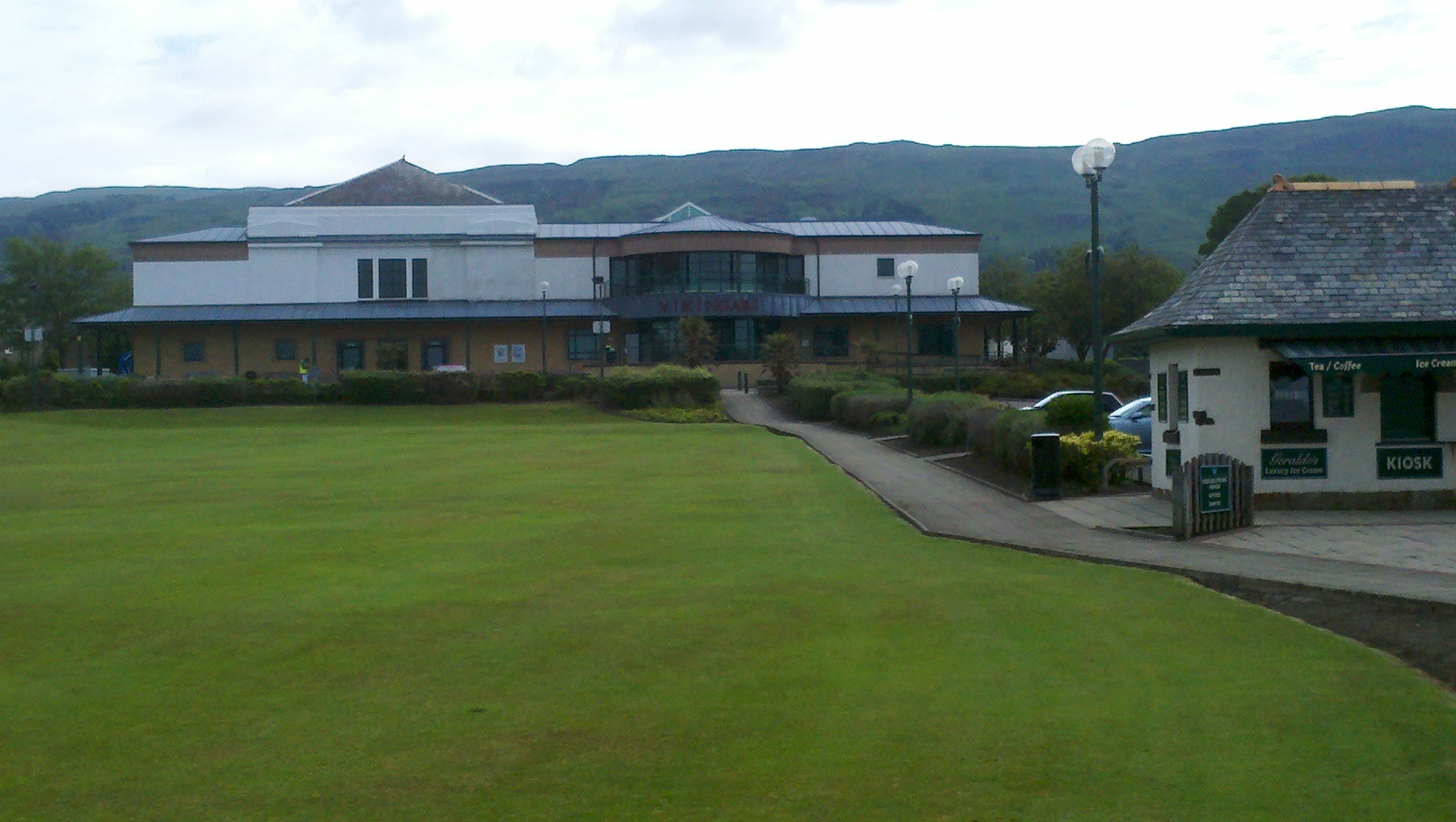
Vikingar Centre

The Barrfields Pavilion Theatre (Barrfields Theatre, Barrfields Pavilion Theatre) is a 500-seat theatre at Barrfields, Largs, North Ayrshire.

== Background ==
Barrfields Pavilion, as it was originally known, was officially opened on 11 April 1930, as a popular variety theatre to cater for the thousands of summer tourists who visited the town of Largs, North Ayrshire. Originally seating 1003, it was home to the lavish Barrfields Summer Season Revues. Many international Scottish entertainers and actors have played the theatre over the years including Rikki Fulton, Jack Milroy, Jimmy Logan, Stanley Baxter, The Krankies, Ronnie Corbett, Johnny Beattie, Billy Connolly and from south of the border, Frankie Vaughan and Pat Kirkwood.

Over the past 80 years, it has also been home to local companies who present pantomimimes, musicals, operettas, variety and plays in the theatre throughout the year. It is now a busy touring venue thanks to the efforts of its associated Barrfields Theatre User Group.

== Refurbishment ==
The theatre was refurbished in 1995, reconstructed alongside a new centre at Barrfields Theatre and Pool called Vikingar. Seating was reduced to 500, and new spacious foyers were created along with dressing room block, Winter Garden Cafe Bar, and new stage facilities.

The theatre is now owned by North Ayrshire Council and under the management of North Ayrshire Leisure Entertainments.

The Barrfields Theatre has a programme which has a strong tradition of amateur dramatic productions, popular children's entertainments, variety, Scottish plays, ballet and touring productions and more staged throughout the year.

== Revival ==
In March 2012, a new voluntary group, Barrfields User Group, was set up to develop and promote the Barrfields Theatre facility.

== Location ==
The theatre is situated as part of the Vikingar leisure Centre, Barrfields, Greenock Road, Largs.

This is part of the municipal policies of Barrfields along with the sports ground and putting green.
