= John Scott (shipbuilder) =

Scottish engineer and shipbuilder

John Scott CB FSA Scot FRSE MICE MINA (5 September 1830, Greenock – 19 May 1903, Ayrshire) was a Scottish engineer and shipbuilder.

== Life ==
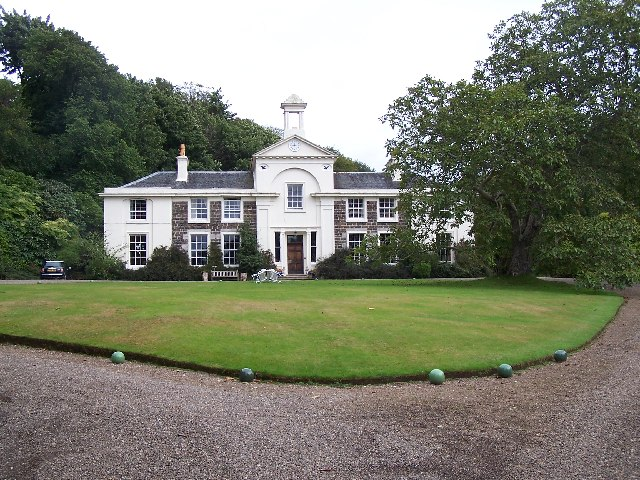
Halkshill House, Ayrshire

He was born at Greenock on 5 September 1830, and was eldest son in the family of five sons and six daughters of Charles Cuningham Scott of Halkshill, Largs, Ayrshire, and his wife, Helen Rankin. His father was partner of Messrs. Scott & Co., a leading firm of shipbuilders on the Clyde, which was founded by an ancestor in 1710.

After education at Edinburgh Academy and then studying at Glasgow University, John served an apprenticeship to his father, and, on attaining his majority, was admitted to partnership in the firm. In 1868, he became its responsible head, in association with his brother, Robert Sinclair Scott, and directed its affairs for thirty-five years. The ships constructed in the Scott yard during his charge of it included many notable vessels for the mercantile marine as well as for the British navy; others, such as the battleships HMS Canopus (1897) and HMS Prince of Wales (1902), were engined there.

Scott was closely connected with the development of the marine steam-engine. At an early date he recognised the economy likely to result from the use of higher steam-pressures, and about 1857 he built the Thetis, of 650 tons, which was fitted with a two-cylinder engine of his own design and with water-tube boilers of the Rowan type, the working-pressure being 125 lbs. per square inch. The result was satisfactory so far as economy of fuel was concerned, though internal corrosion of the tubes rendered it necessary to withdraw the boilers after a short time. A little later, with the assent of Henri Dupuy de Lôme, then head of the French navy department, Scott introduced the water-tube boiler into a corvette which his firm built for the French navy – the first French warship fitted with compound engines. Similar boilers and engines were proposed by him and accepted for a corvette for the British navy, but owing to the impossibility of complying with the requirement that the tops of the boilers should be at least one foot below the load-line, the adoption of the water-tube boiler was deferred. Further pursuit of the question of higher steam-pressures brought him the acquaintance of Samson Fox, with whom he was associated for many years in the development of the corrugated flue. He became chairman of the Leeds Forge Company, and carried out in conjunction with Fox the first effective tests of the strength of circular furnaces.

Although his business claimed the greater part of his attention, Scott had several other interests. He made three unsuccessful attempts to enter Parliament as conservative candidate for Greenock – in 1880, 1884, and 1885. For many years he was deputy chairman of the Greenock Harbour Trust, and for twenty-five years chairman of the local marine board. He was a lover of books and formed one of the finest private libraries in Scotland, containing some rare first editions and early manuscripts as well as literature relating to his own profession. An ardent yachtsman, he was a member of many Scottish yacht clubs, and commodore of the Royal Clyde Yacht Club.

Scott also took an active interest in the volunteer movement, and in 1859 he raised two battalions of artillery volunteers. From 1862 to 1894, he was lieutenant-colonel of the Renfrew and Dumbarton artillery brigades, and on relinquishing active duty in the latter year he was made honorary colonel. For his services in connection with the movement he was made C.B. in 1887.

He was one of the original members of the Institution of Naval Architects, established in 1860, and became a member of council in 1886, and a vice-president in 1903. In 1889, he contributed to the Society's Transactions a paper, 'Experiments on endeavouring to burst a Boiler Shell made to Admiralty Scantlings,' which was the outcome of some tests made by him with boilers for the gunboats Sparrow and Thrush built by his firm for the British navy. He was elected a member of the Institution of Civil Engineers in 1888, and was also a member of the Institution of Engineers and Shipbuilders in Scotland, F.R.S. of Edinburgh and F.S.A. Scotland.

He died at Halkshill House on 19 May 1903, and was buried at Largs.

Scott's library, which was rich in works connected with Scotland and the Stuarts as well as in naval and shipbuilding literature, was sold at Sotheby's (27 March-3 April 1905).

== Family ==
He married in Sept. 1864 Annie Spalding, eldest daughter of Robert Spalding of Kingston, Jamaica, and had by her two sons and a daughter.

== See also ==
- Robert Sinclair Scott
- Scotts Shipbuilding and Engineering Company
