= Skelmorlie =

Village in North Ayrshire, Scotland

Coordinates: 55.88°N 4.89°W

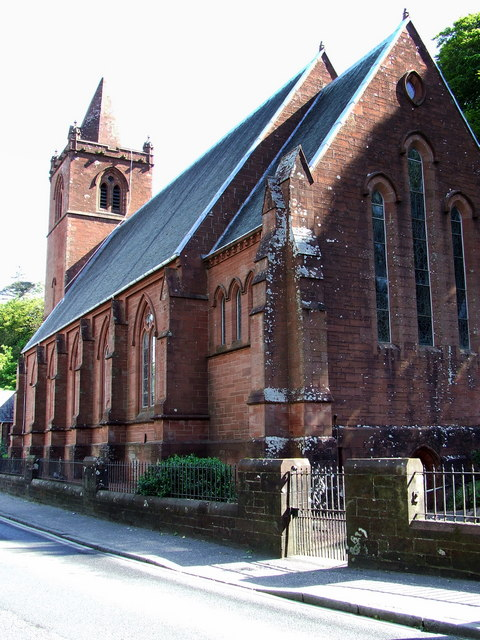
- Skelmorlie and Wemyss Bay Parish Church

- Location within North Ayrshire
- Population: 2,060 (2020)
- OS grid reference: NS195688
- Council area: North Ayrshire
- Lieutenancy area: Ayrshire and Arran
- Country: Scotland
- Sovereign state: United Kingdom
- Post town: SKELMORLIE
- Postcode district: PA17
- Dialling code: 01475
- Police: Scotland
- Fire: Scottish
- Ambulance: Scottish
- UK Parliament: North Ayrshire and Arran
- Scottish Parliament: Cunninghame North

Skelmorlie is a village in North Ayrshire in the southwest of Scotland. Although it is the northernmost settlement in the council area of North Ayrshire it is contiguous with Wemyss Bay, which is in Inverclyde, and has a PA zone postcode unlike the rest of Ayrshire which is in the KA zone. The dividing line is the Kelly Burn, which flows into the Firth of Clyde just south of the Rothesay ferry terminal and Wemyss Bay train station. Despite their proximity, the two villages have historically been divided, Skelmorlie in Ayrshire and Wemyss Bay in Renfrewshire.

Skelmorlie itself is divided into two sections, Lower and Upper Skelmorlie. There is one primary school in the village, with secondary age pupils going to Largs Academy in North Ayrshire. In common with this part of the Clyde foreshore, the rich red sandstone is a prominent feature of the landscape and housing in Skelmorlie.

== Early Skelmorlie ==
The village is nestled on a plateau and is situated 30–60 m above sea level. It overlooks the four-mile-wide (six-kilometre) Firth of Clyde, with views across to the beginning of the Scottish Highlands. The outstanding panoramic view from the area stretches from Arran and the "sleeping warrior" in the south-west to the mountains either side of Loch Long to the North.

It is known that "a significant population" lived around the area behind the present-day Manor Park Hotel in the 9th to 11th century, and evidence supports the theory that an early Celtic church existed there before the arrival of the Cluniac Monks (who formed Paisley Abbey in 1163) and the foundation of the Roman Church.

The land on which the modern day village now stands was passed from King Malcolm III to the Cunninghames, and was subsequently acquired by Sir Alexander de Montgomerie of Ardrossan on 25 March 1453, when his sister Anne married Sir Robert Cunninghame of Kilmaurs.

The Montgomeries were Normans, descended from William the Conqueror's great grandmother. There were thirteen Montgomeries of Skelmorlie, the line being founded in 1461 by George Montgomerie, 2nd son of the first Lord Montgomerie.

The earliest known record of a "building" in the village is a building in the shape of a simple keep, which was built around 1502 on the site of what is now called Skelmorlie Castle. This keep was in the corner of the castle nearest Stirrats Farm.

There were six baronets (a holder of a hereditary title awarded by the British Crown titled Sir, but never entitled to sit in the House of Lords), starting with Sir Robert Montgomerie in 1628 (knighted by King James VI, who attended his funeral and wept with the mourners in 1651) and ending with Sir Hugh Montgomerie, who was very active in the political affairs of Glasgow, being both Provost and MP for Glasgow; he was also a commissioner of the Treaty of the Union.

Sir Hugh's nephew Robert had an elder daughter called Lilias, whose marriage united the estate to the senior branch of the Family of Eglinton. The Cunninghames held the northern part of Skelmorlie for a while before passing it to the Montgomeries, the split being the burn at the Meigle. The southern half was further split in two - nearest the south was Blackhouse (on or near to the site of the Manor Park Hotel) and nearest the north was Thirdpart, Barr, Moat and Auchengarth.

The area of Knock entered into the possession of John, 1st Montgomerie of Blackhouse, when his son Patrick married a Frazer of Knock. A feu charter in favour of "Patrick Montgomerie of Blackhous" can still be seen in the Manor Park Hotel.

Patrick was succeeded by Hugh Montgomerie and then by John Montgomerie. John was a Lieutenant Colonel in the Covenanters who was killed fighting Cromwell at Dunbar, his heir, also Patrick sold the estate to the Bannatynes of Kelly in 1633 and was the last of the Montgomeries of Blackhouse. The estate stayed part of the Kelly estate until the 1800s

When Kelly Castle was burnt in 1740, the Bannatynes moved into Blackhouse which they had owned for a century. They sold it in 1780 and bought it back in 1795 after Kelly was sold.

The 18th Century saw the end of feudal society (where peasants worked the land and contributed work to their land'lords') and the growth of industry. Communities were beginning to form at Finnock (Inverkip), Kellybridge and Skelmorlie (Meigle). Simultaneously, some of this population was moving and accumulating in Largs.

Most significantly, the 18th century saw the rise in the importance of the River Clyde and the increase in trade that it brought.

The original road from Greenock went up Station Hill, up Skelmorlie Castle Road, down past the Castle, veered left (never reaching where the main road is now) then back up through Meigle to Largs. It was close to this road on the high ground that all the habitation existed.

The area between the Kelly Burn and the track from Innes Park Road to Skelmorlie Community Centre was renamed Oakfield.

== History ==
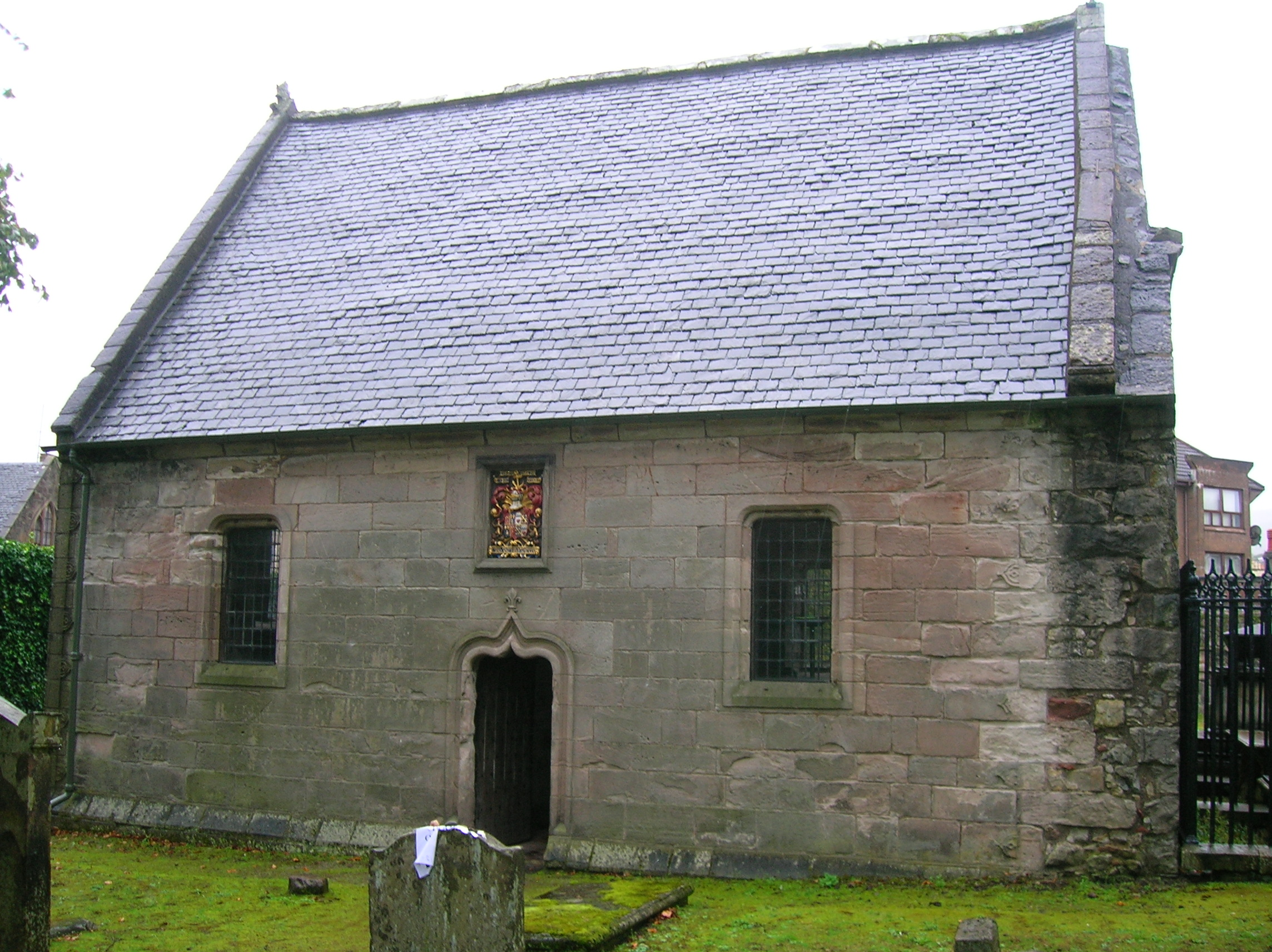
The Skelmorlie Aisle in Largs.

Skelmorlie's history is recorded as far back as the fifteenth century. Skelmorlie Castle, south of the village, is a tower house built on the site of an older structure in 1502. Much altered and added to since, it is an ancient seat of the Clan Montgomery (a notable burial tomb of the family can be seen at Skelmorlie Aisle in Largs). During the nineteenth century the village was once home to many Glasgow tea barons. On the cliff above the shore a large hydropathic institution once stood, with access from the main road via a lift whose shaft was hewn out of the rock face. The building later operated as a hotel, but was demolished in the 1990s.

To the south of Skelmorlie is the serpent mound, a prehistoric, perhaps druidic, site apparently carved either deliberately for religious uses or by nature then reused due to its natural shape.

On 18 April 1925, an embankment on the reservoir which belonged to the Eglinton Estate and provided the main water supply for the whole village gave way, releasing millions of gallons of water down through the village. After ten minutes many homes, streets and gardens were shattered and five people, four of them children, were killed.

The composer and arranger Brian Fahey and his wife Audrey lived in Skelmorlie from 1972 until her death in 2006.

== Skelmorlie Measured Mile ==
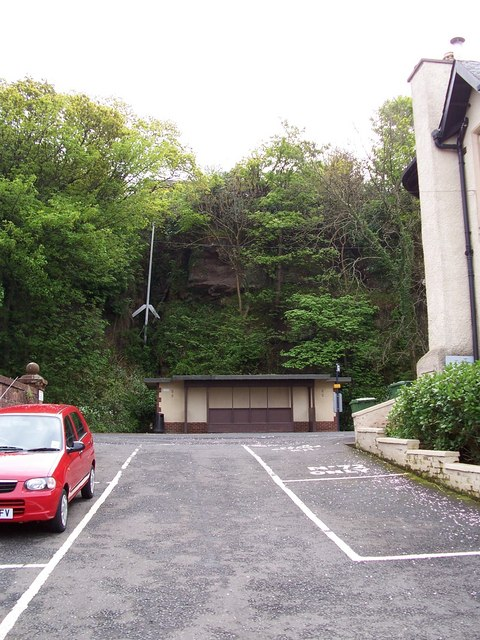
The inland northern marker and the old bus shelter at Shore Road. This marker is now badly damaged.

Before the introduction of GPS systems, measured nautical miles were used to measure the speed of new ships under sea trials before being handed over by the shipyard to the owner. In the early part of the 20th century, the Royal Navy used a measured nautical mile in the Firth of Clyde off Skelmorlie, known as the 'Skelmorlie Mile', as the range for speed trials of new warships. The mile was also used for merchant shipping trials well into the 1980s.

In simple terms, a nautical measured mile is a nautical mile which is marked by two pairs of posts on or near the shore. The ship, already at top speed and on the requisite bearing, sails from one pair of posts to the next. A stopwatch is started when the first two posts are aligned and then stopped when the next two posts are aligned. Each post has a 'V' or inverted V-shaped marker on it which forms an 'X' with its partner post when they are exactly aligned. To accurately measure performance, ships had to make several runs in both directions to compensate for variations in wind and tide.

The 'Skelmorlie Mile' is a Category B Listed Structure. It was established in 1866 by the Clyde shipbuilding firm of Robert Napier & Sons. It was surveyed by two different land surveyors, namely Kyle & Frew and Smith & Wharrie, and was checked by Admiralty staff.

It consists of two pairs of tall, white painted poles, each pair set 1 nautical mile (1,852 metres) from each other. The poles are set on concrete bases, with iron stays, and have sight markers at the upper level. The northern pair of posts can be found by the bus shelter at the foot of the Hydro Steps, near the turning point on Shore Road. One of these is on the shore and can be accessed by walking a couple of hundred metres south and entering the beach by the steps at the small pumping station. The other northern post is mounted halfway up a cliff behind the bus shelter and has fallen into severe disrepair, the top half having snapped and fallen to the side. The southern pair of posts are at the south end of Skelmorlie, immediately south of Skelmorlie Castle. One of these is on the rocky shore, near the A78 road, the other is in a field between the A78 and Meigle.
