= Robert Sinclair Scott =

Scottish shipbuilder.(1853–1905)

- Born: 23 September 1843; Largs, Ayrshire, Scotland
- Died: 28 February 1905 (aged 61); Glasgow, Scotland
- Occupation: Shipbuilder
- Spouse: Frances Jane Spalding
- Children: Harold Henry Sinclair Scott, Cedric Cunningham Sinclair Scott
- Parent(s): Charles Cuningham Scott, Helen Rankin

Robert Sinclair Scott (1843 – 1905) was a Scottish shipbuilder. Along with his brother John he built more than a thousand ships at the family firm Scotts Shipbuilding and Engineering Company.

== Biography ==
Robert Sinclair Scott was born into a family of shipbuilders: his father was Charles Cuningham Scott and his mother was Helen Rankin.

== See also ==
- John Scott (shipbuilder)
- Scotts Shipbuilding and Engineering Company

== Bibliography ==
- Johnman, Lewis (2005). Scott Lithgow : déjâ vu all over again! : the rise and fall of a shipbuilding company. St. John's, Newfoundland: International Maritime Economic History Association. ISBN 9780973893403.
- Scotts' Shipbuilding & Engineering Co. Ltd. (1906). Two centuries of shipbuilding by the Scotts at Greenock. London: Offices of "Engineering".
