= Abby Kane =

British Paralympic swimmer (born 2003)

Personal information
- Nationality: British
- Born: 4 August 2003 (age 22)

Sport
- Sport: Swimming
- Strokes: Backstroke
- Club: University of Stirling
- Coach: Josh Williamson
Medal record
Women's swimming
Representing Great Britain
Paralympic Games
Silver medal – second place	2016 Rio de Janeiro	100m backstroke S13

Abby Kane (born 4 August 2003) is a British Paralympic swimmer competing as a S13 classification swimmer, mainly in backstroke events.

Kane has Stargardt disease, a condition leading to progressive vision deterioration.

== Career ==
She competed at the 2016 Summer Paralympics in Rio de Janeiro, where she won the silver medal in the 100m backstroke S13 event. She also came 6th in the 400m Freestyle and finished 6th in the 50m freestyle heats. She was the youngest member of ParalympicsGB at the 2016 Paralympics.

Since 2018 Kane has been training with North Ayrshire Swimming coached by Jess Wilkie.
