= Sawers =

Sawers may refer to:

- Alexander Sawers, Scottish footballer
- Bill Sawers (1871–1960), Scottish footballer
- John Sawers (painter), 17th-century Scottish painter and decorator
- John Sawers (born 1955), British diplomat and civil servant
- Louisa Sawers (born 1988), British canoeist
- Rowan Sawers (born 1954), Australian rules football umpire
- William Sawers (1844–1916), Scottish–Australian politician
