= Lion Chambers =

Coordinates: 55°51′49″N 4°15′27″W

- Interactive map of Lion Chambers
- Location: Hope Street, Glasgow G2 2TU, Scotland
- Built: 1904–1907
- Built for: William George Black
- Architect: James Salmon Jnr (Salmon, Son & Gillespie)

Listed Building – Category A
- Official name: 170, 172 Hope Street, Lion Chambers
- Designated: 6 July 1966
- Reference no.: LB33059

The Lion Chambers is a building in the city centre of Glasgow, Scotland which began construction in 1904 and was completed in 1907. It was designated as a Category A listed building in 1966. It still stands today despite it recently being abandoned due to structural weakness. The building features stonework on the exterior showing a lion's head referencing the name, as well as the upper bodies of some Judges of the court, since the building was intended to comprise mainly lawyers' offices. It was made using a somewhat experimental method of construction called the Hennebique System which involves a reinforced concrete as its main material; the technique has fallen out of favour in modern times. Whether the building will be demolished or receive funding to be refurbished remains to be seen.

== History ==
The Lion Chambers was originally designed by James Salmon and John Gaff Gillespie, who together formed the partnership known as Salmon, Son & Gillespie. The two were commissioned by William George Black, a lawyer and writer based in Glasgow who was well-established within the Glasgow Art Club, which included some well-known artists such as James Abbott McNeill Whistler. Because of this he integrated into his plans artists' studios that would be located in the top floors. The Glasgow Corporation was known to have somewhat of a soft spot for the innovative club of which Black was a member, and it is thought this may have helped to get the Lion Chambers approved for construction.

The building was home to many lawyers and artists for most of the 20th century, until the majority had to be evacuated in 1995 due to the decision that it was too dangerous to regularly use. The ground floor and basement were still used up until 2009 when it was decided that they too should be evacuated. The building remains there to this day with no clear indication of its future – the sum needed to restore it back to safe condition is far too great for the multiple co-owners to afford, and no one else has shown enough interest to invest in it. The building has been threatened with demolition since 1991 when the co-owners were served with a "Dangerous Building Notice", but the threats fell through because the building is Category A listed. In April 1991, water-pooling, cracking and spalling affected the building due to its structural decay. The co-owners decide to pursue demolition, since the repairs were estimated at £1–1.5 million. Four years later, The Scotsman reported that due to the danger of collapsing, all the occupants had been evacuated. Building Control assessed the building. On 12 April 1995, The Independent reported that the owners of Lion Chambers has been served with a Dangerous Building Notice, after which they submitted a demolition application. A month later, The Herald reported that for only 20 more years life of the building, the repairs would cost around £1.5 million. A report by the Glasgow Building Preservation Trust was submitted to Glasgow City Council, proposing a longer-term but more expensive approach to repairs. On 29 August 1995 the permission to demolish was refused, giving the owners six more months to deal with the Dangerous Building Notice. Glasgow Building Preservation Trust entered discussions about undertaking repairs, and also requested for notice of other parties wishing to take on the building. In October 1997, Glasgow Building Preservation Trust reported that they wanted to develop a centre for young designers, including workshop and training spaces, called the Centre for Product Resource Innovation and Design Enterprise (PRIDE). In 1999, £5,000 was granted for a feasibility study, as reported by The Annual Report of the Architectural Heritage Fund, stating that re-using as dwellings and workshop space would be viable. Historic Scotland and Glasgow City Council agreed that more research would be required into the building's mode of construction.

== Architecture ==

Despite many common Glaswegian features such as typical corner turrets, careful modelling of the external walls and a pair of steep gables on the roof, the building was built using the Hennebique system by French Engineer, François Hennebique. This system involves mainly reinforced concrete offering an alternative to steel frames, making the building fireproof. The Hennebique system was designed to strengthen concrete to make it withstand forces which damage concrete the most and consists of using situ concrete (situ meaning 'cast in its place'). This allows the walls to be extremely thin – with a thickness of 100 millimetres (4 inches) – to maximise the amount of space within the rooms and avoid the need to have exterior scaffolding. The Hennebique system was first used in 1894 in Wiggen, Switzerland and the Lion Chambers was the second building in Scotland to adopt this system and one of the first buildings in the UK.

However, the Hennebique system is not as popular in the UK as in the 1900s because of its many negative attributes, including the complexity of the framework and moulding in the manufacturing process. The architecture of the building allows the concrete to weather away easily, considerably in weather in the United Kingdom, which was one of the main reasons the Lion Chambers had to be abandoned. Additionally, the building doesn't provide the heat qualities required to meet today's standards.

== Damages ==
Original design presented to the William George Black showed many weak points, including the lack of Thermal Insulation of the external walls and roof surfaces, causing condensation on the internal surfaces. Additionally, there was no external insulation against water penetration on the basement walls. This caused water to be able to penetrate the basement walls, which eventually led to the evacuation of the basement in 2009. In 2009, a feasibility study for the reparation of the Lion Chambers was instructed by Historic Scotland. The study advised there to be additional reparations to the building as further corrosion occurred due to the lack of activity in the building and the Glasgow City Council provided £156,000 to replace materials used in the building with wire mesh due to concerns over debris falling from the building. Furthermore, around 25% of the windows have been boarded over due to safety reasons and the northern and eastern walls have been vandalised at ground level

== Future of the Lion Chambers ==
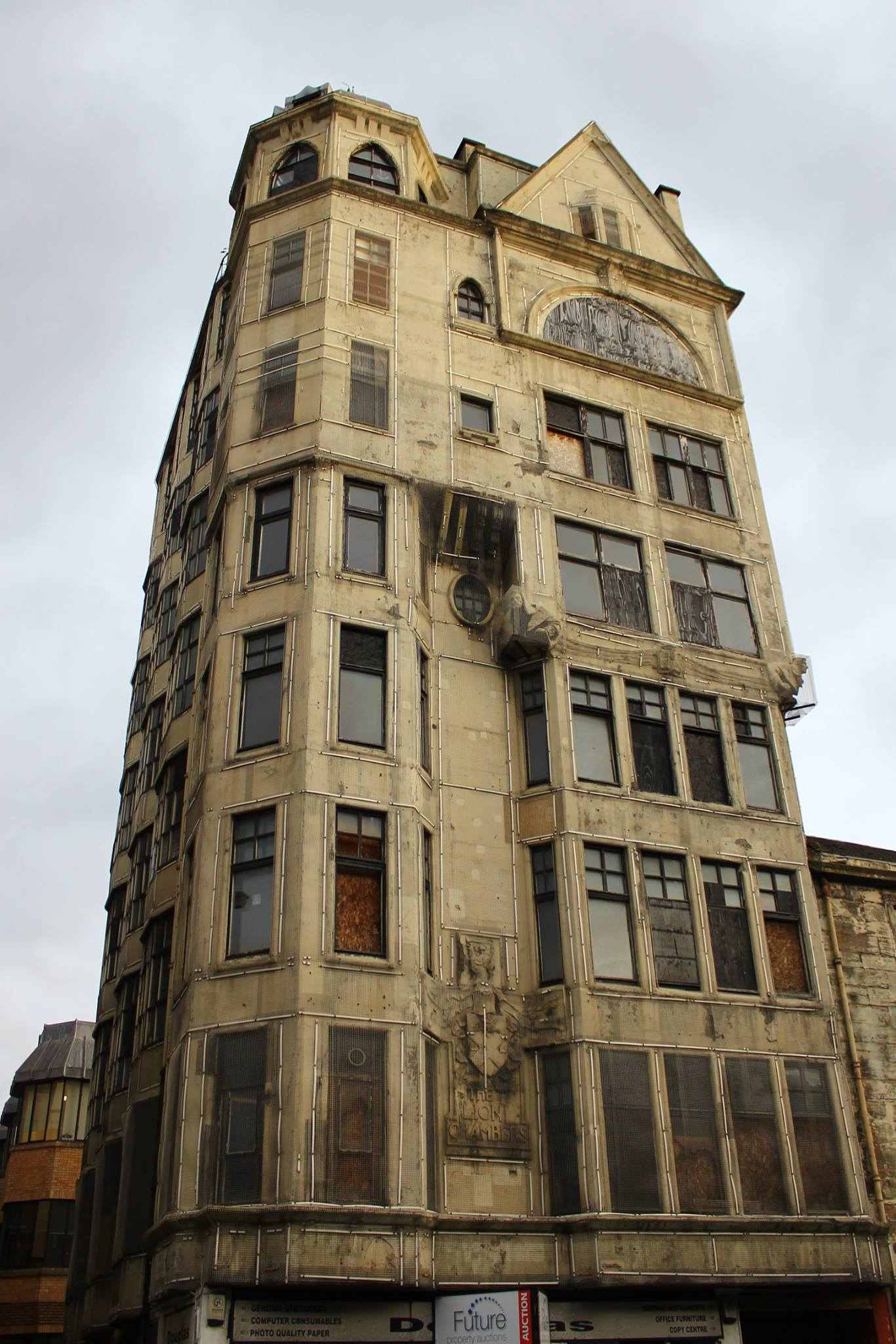
Exterior of the building in 2016

After the departure of the a tenant in 2016, Douglas, the owner of a supplies shop that occupied the ground floor, the 12,628-square-foot (1,173.2-square-metre) building lay vacant until a hair salon opened in the unit in September 2020. In 2016 it was valued and being sold at £113,000. Although the building has a relatively low value, the restoration of the building would cost more than £1.3m, which has led the owners of the building struggling to find a bidder. There have been other attempts by agencies to restore the Lion Chamber, such as Four Acres Charitable Trust and the Glasgow City Council, however, all attempts are yet to be successful. Despite the pursuit of finding a solution to Lion Chambers, Historic Scotland and Glasgow City Council are committed to finding a solution to save the building. However, in 2000 on 26 October the Scotsman reported that Glasgow City Council had approved funding of £156,000 to be used to replace current scaffolding with a wire mesh, allowing for a further two years in which for them to create a funding package. Also in 2001 the Annual Report of the Historic Buildings Council for Scotland reported that £22,958 had been awarded to aid costs with scaffolding. In 2002 the Annual Report of GBPT reported that the idea to raise wire mesh was still in talks and that if completed would mean that the Dangerous Buildings notice would be removed from the site. Due to two buses colliding with the scaffolding, the scaffolding had to be rebuilt around the site. In 2004 the scaffolding began to be taken down, leaving the wire mesh still up. It was also reported by local planners that the building was available but not for leasing. In 2006 the GBPT back out of any arrangements with the building. By 2007 the lower floor of the building was only being used as an office supplies shop. Despite that windows were still boarded over and many of the walls had been vandalised with graffiti. In 2010 the last business unit located within the building moves out, leaving the building empty, this is supposedly because of the poor condition of the building. It is reported that Glasgow City Council offered the building to multiple owners for restoration at the price of only £1, however no successful deal were made. Glasgow City Council and Historic Scotland are still strongly committed to finding a solution to save the building.

== See also ==
- List of Category A listed buildings in Glasgow
- List of listed buildings in Glasgow/2
