= Thomas Brisbane =

British Army officer and colonial administrator

Major-General Sir Thomas Brisbane GCB Bt GCH FRS FRSE
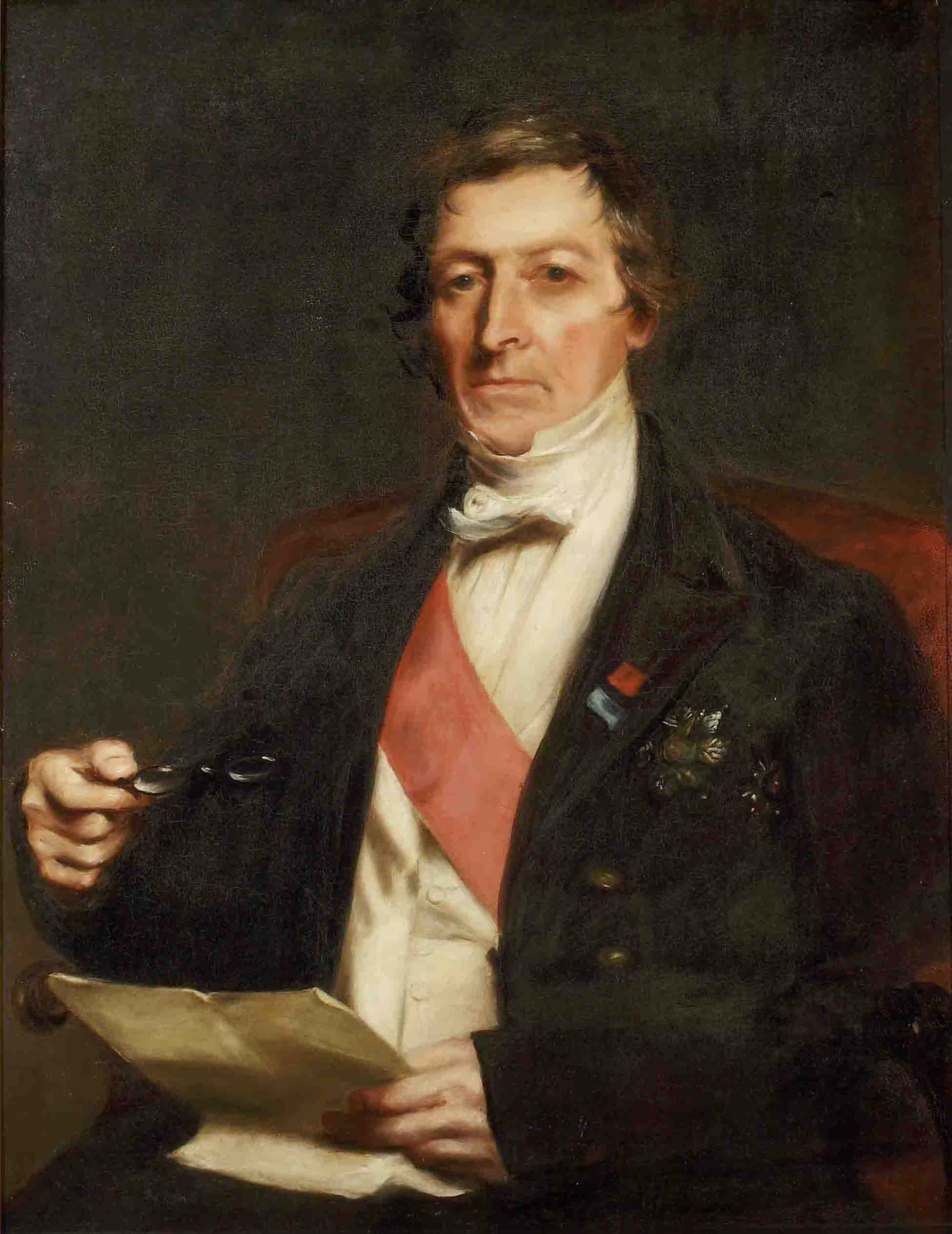
- Portrait by Friedrich T. Schenck, 1850

6th Governor of New South Wales
- In office 1 December 1821 – 1 December 1825
- Monarch: George IV
- Preceded by: Lachlan Macquarie
- Succeeded by: Ralph Darling

Personal details
- Born: 23 July 1773 Largs, Ayrshire, Scotland
- Died: 27 January 1860 (aged 86) Largs, Ayrshire, Scotland
- Education: University of Edinburgh

Military service
- Allegiance: United Kingdom
- Branch/service: British Army
- Rank: Major-General
- Battles/wars: War of the First Coalition; Second Carib War; Peninsular War; War of 1812; Bathurst War
- Awards: Knight Grand Cross of the Order of the Bath; Knight Grand Cross of the Royal Guelphic Order; Army Gold Cross

Major-General Sir Thomas Makdougall Brisbane, 1st Baronet (23 July 1773 – 27 January 1860) was a British Army officer, colonial administrator and astronomer. He served in many important wars of the late 18th and early 19th centuries, including front-line action during the Peninsular War. Upon the recommendation of the Duke of Wellington, with whom Brisbane had served, he was appointed as Governor of New South Wales from 1821 to 1825.

In the colony, he implemented expansionist land policies that benefited wealthy colonists, while also augmenting the system of convict punishment. A keen astronomer, he built the colony's second observatory and encouraged scientific and agricultural training. Brisbane also declared martial law against the Indigenous Wiradjuri people to quash their resistance to colonisation. The convict settlement of Brisbane established during his tenure was named in his honour and is now the third-largest city in Australia.

== Early life ==
Brisbane was born in 1773 at Brisbane House in Noddsdale, near Largs in Ayrshire, Scotland, the son of Sir Thomas Brisbane and his wife Eleanora (née Bruce). He was born into an aristocratic military family and as a child was home educated by prestigious tutors. As a teenager, he was educated at the University of Edinburgh, and later boarded at an English academy in Kensington, London, where he learnt mathematics and astronomy.

== Military career ==
In 1789, Brisbane was commissioned into the British Army's 38th (1st Staffordshire) Regiment of Foot as a junior officer and was posted to Ireland.

=== French Revolutionary Wars ===
Following Revolutionary France's declaration of war against Britain on 1 February 1793, Brisbane transferred to the 53rd (Shropshire) Regiment of Foot and fought in the Low Countries theatre of the War of the First Coalition under the Duke of York. Between June 1793 and November 1794, Brisbane participated in the siege of Valenciennes, siege of Dunkirk, siege of Nieuwpoort, siege of Landrecies, Battle of Tournay and siege of Nijmegen. Following the fall of Nijmegen to the French in November 1794, the British army in the Low Countries was evacuated and returned to England in spring 1795.

=== West Indies ===
In November 1795, the 53rd Foot was sent to the West Indies. Brisbane took part in the capture of Saint Lucia from the French in May 1796, participating in the storming of Morne Fortune on 24 May. Later in the same year, he fought in the Second Carib War, an uprising by Kalinago and Garifuna people under Joseph Chatoyer against British rule in Saint Vincent. During the uprising, Brisbane personally killed the Kalinago chief Taquin in combat and subsequently participated in the deportation of the Garifuna to the small island of Baliceaux in the Grenadines. In the following year, Brisbane was present at the capture of Trinidad in February and the failed invasion of Puerto Rico in April. Brisbane then transferred to the 69th (South Lincolnshire) Regiment of Foot which returned to England in 1802 after being stationed in the British colony of Jamaica.

=== Peninsular War ===
After a brief period of being retired on half-pay, Brisbane was appointed as an army assistant in the Adjutant-General's office, serving under the Duke of Wellington. In 1813 he was promoted to major general in the 74th Regiment and saw much action during the Peninsular War, including leading a brigade in the 3rd Division that broke through at the Battle of Vitoria. For his services in the Peninsula War, Brisbane received the Army Gold Cross with one clasp for the battles of Vitoria, the Pyrenees, Nivelle, Orthez and Toulouse; and the silver war medal with one clasp for the Nive.

=== North America ===
With the forces of Napoleon all but defeated, Brisbane was appointed as a brigade commander to lead troops in the concurrent War of 1812 with the United States. In 1814 he led a brigade at the Battle of Plattsburgh, which Brisbane claimed the British troops present could have won if they had been allowed to launch a full infantry attack. During the battle, he used the Charles C. Platt Homestead as his headquarters.

=== Paris occupying force ===
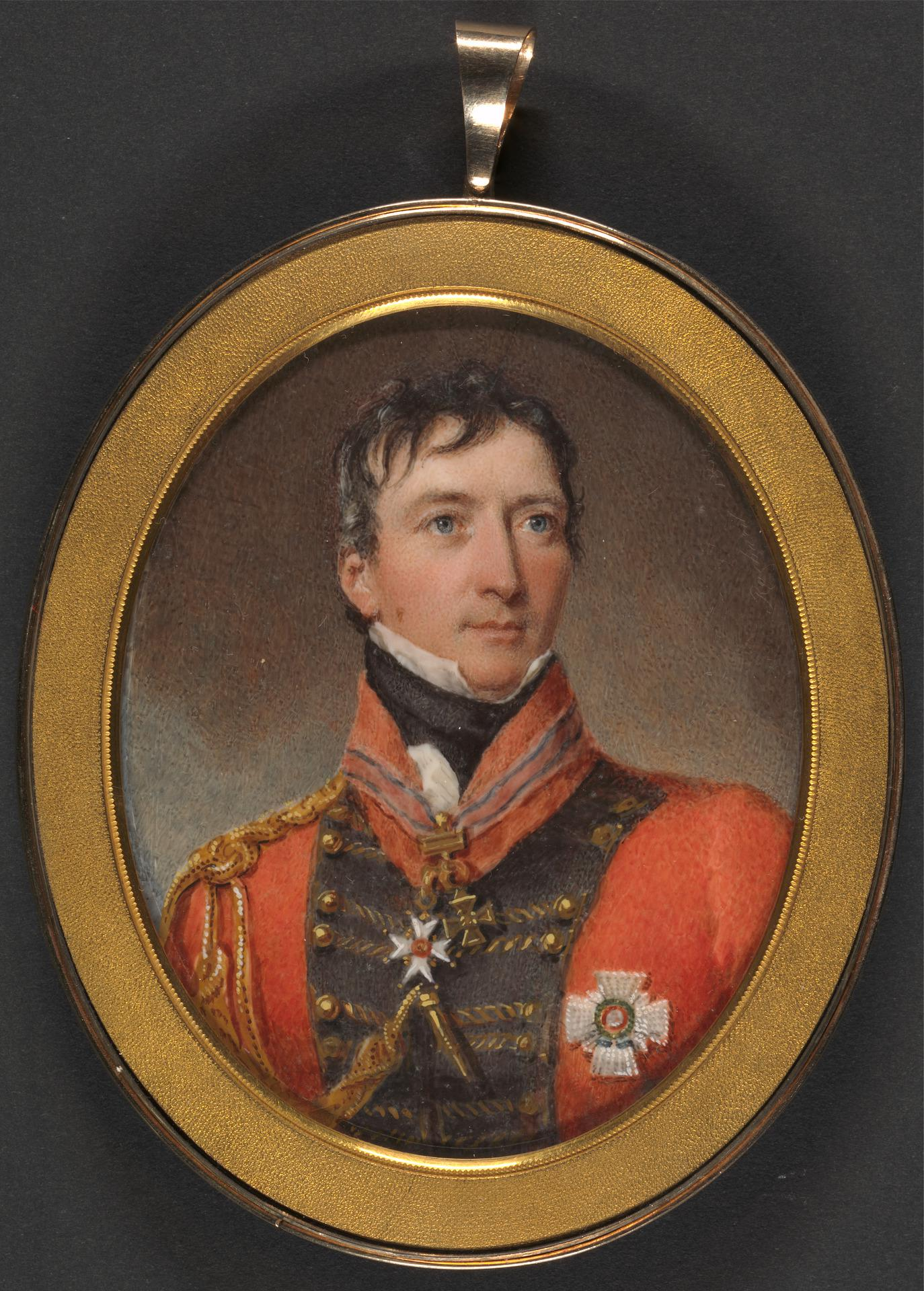
1819 miniature portrait of Brisbane

With the British defeat at Plattsburgh and the Napoleonic forces finally being vanquished at the Battle of Waterloo, Brisbane was returned to Europe and given command of twelve regiments to occupy Paris in accordance with the Treaty of Paris. From 1815 to 1818, Brisbane remained in Paris before the occupation forces were recalled to England. In November 1819 he married Anna Maria Hay Makdougall of Makerstoun, Roxburghshire, Scotland. On his father-in-law's death, Brisbane assumed the additional surname, becoming Makdougall Brisbane.

== Governor of New South Wales ==
=== Land grants to the rich and increased convict punishment ===
In 1821, on the recommendation of the Duke of Wellington, Brisbane was appointed as Governor of New South Wales, a post he held until 1825. Brisbane took over the government on 1 December 1821.

A report by John Bigge disparaged the policies of the previous governor, Lachlan Macquarie, which the conservative Tory British government at the time regarded as wasteful, expensive and too lenient on the convicts.

Guided by the Bigge report and instructions from the High Tory British Secretary of State, Earl Bathurst, Brisbane re-established the Norfolk Island convict settlement and oversaw the formation of new penal colonies at Port Macquarie and also at Sarah Island on the remote west coast of Van Diemen's Land. These establishments were to serve as dreaded places of isolation and punishment for the convicts. In 1823, Brisbane also sent Lieutenant John Oxley to find another new site for convicts who were repeat offenders. Oxley surveyed a large river flowing into Moreton Bay and a year later, the first convicts arrived at the Moreton Bay Penal Settlement. Brisbane visited the settlement in December 1824 and Oxley suggested that the river be named the Brisbane River. The settlement, which was later opened to free settlers in 1839, was also renamed as Brisbane after him.

Brisbane also introduced a new land grant system which stipulated that for every acre granted the grantee would be assigned, free of expense to the crown, one convict labourer. Large land grants given to rich and well-connected colonists were favoured through this system, including a contract of a million acres to a consortium of entrepreneurs led by John Macarthur known as the Australian Agricultural Company. This policy enabled the colonial government to drastically reduce the maintenance costs of convicts while providing rich colonists with accessible cheap labour.

These decisions firmly halted the socially progressive policies of Lachlan Macquarie and reaffirmed strong class distinctions within the colonial society. The exclusive 'Pure Merino' class of colonists (named after the type of sheep they bred) were able obtain large areas of land and significant political influence. This class of colonist evolved to dominate much of colonial society for many years, becoming known as the squattocracy.

=== Free press and representative government ===
Although Brisbane introduced many of the recommendations of Bigge's report, he did not limit his attention just to this.

He also implemented the beginnings of representative government by the establishment in 1823 of the first New South Wales Legislative Council. Although there were only a handful of members in this council, all of which were appointed by Brisbane and had no real power except to advise the governor, it gradually evolved over decades into a modern elective representative body.

=== Colonial expansion ===
In contrast to the previous governorship of Lachlan Macquarie, who was very cautious in the process of British expansion into the continent, Brisbane's rapid granting of large areas of land to venture capitalists and colonists resulted in a significant expansion of British land appropriation. This was particularly the case in the areas around Bathurst and in the Hunter Valley. Brisbane gave away around 100,000 acres of land in the Bathurst region, while 500,000 acres was granted in the Hunter Valley. An additional one million acres was granted to the Australian Agricultural Company in the Port Stephens area.

The expansion of British influence into more remote areas was also achieved by the establishment of the new convict colonies at Port Macquarie, Sarah Island and Moreton Bay. Brisbane also set up a convict agricultural training facility on the colonial frontier at Wellington, and a military outpost on the northern coast of Australia at Fort Dundas.

=== The Bathurst War ===
The rapid rate of land appropriation in the Bathurst region during Brisbane's time as governor caused the displacement of the resident Wiradjuri people. Their resistance to colonisation led to conflict between the British settlers and these local Indigenous Australians. The Bathurst War, as it became known, resulted in the killing of dozens of Wiradjuri men, women and children, together with the deaths of around 13 stockmen.

By August 1824, this conflict was causing major disruptions to British interests in the region and, with a view of ending the war by force, Brisbane declared martial law over the Bathurst area. Soldiers under Major James Thomas Morisset scoured the region for Wiradjuri, while groups of armed colonists massacred them with impunity. When Brisbane declared an end to the war in December 1824, the Wiradjuri had been defeated with their main leader, Windradyne, suing for peace.

=== "Exclusives" disgruntled with Brisbane ===
Despite receiving large tracts of land for free and a virtually unlimited supply of cheap convict labour, many of the colonial elite in New South Wales were displeased with Brisbane. These so-called "exclusives", led by people such as John Macarthur and the ultra-conservative clergyman Samuel Marsden, were critical that Brisbane's policies, such as a free press, did not go far enough toward establishing New South Wales as an aristocratically led plantation economy.

== Astronomer ==
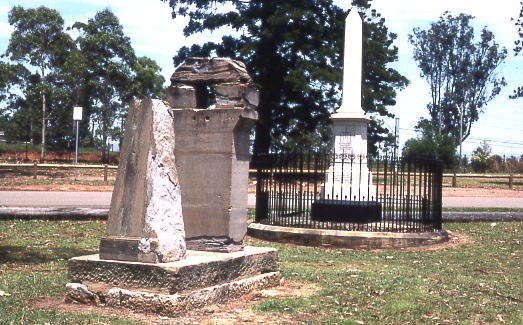
Remains of observatory in Parramatta Park, Parramatta, NSW

Brisbane was a keen astronomer throughout his career. He had an observatory built at his ancestral home in 1808. From this observatory he was able to contribute to the advances in navigation which took place over the next hundred years. He took telescopes, books and two astronomical assistants, Carl Ludwig Christian Rümker and James Dunlop to New South Wales with him. On arrival he had the first properly-equipped Australian observatory built at Parramatta while waiting for his predecessor, Governor Macquarie to complete his final arrangements.

The Parramatta observatory recorded stars of the southern hemisphere, the first detailed observations from the continent. Its major contribution was Rümker's rediscovery of Encke's comet in 1822. Brisbane left his equipment and books in the colony when he returned to Scotland. Remnants of this collection survive in the Sydney Observatory.

Brisbane's keen interest in science led him to accept the invitation to become the first President of the Philosophical Society of Australasia that later became the Royal Society of New South Wales. He was the first patron of the New South Wales Agricultural Society. He arranged experiments in growing tobacco, cotton, coffee and New Zealand flax in the colony.

== Later life ==
He was created Knight Commander of the Order of the Bath in 1814 and Knight Grand Cross of the Order of the Bath in 1837. He published The Brisbane Catalogue of 7,385 stars of the Southern Hemisphere in 1835. The Observatory in Parramatta was used until 1855.

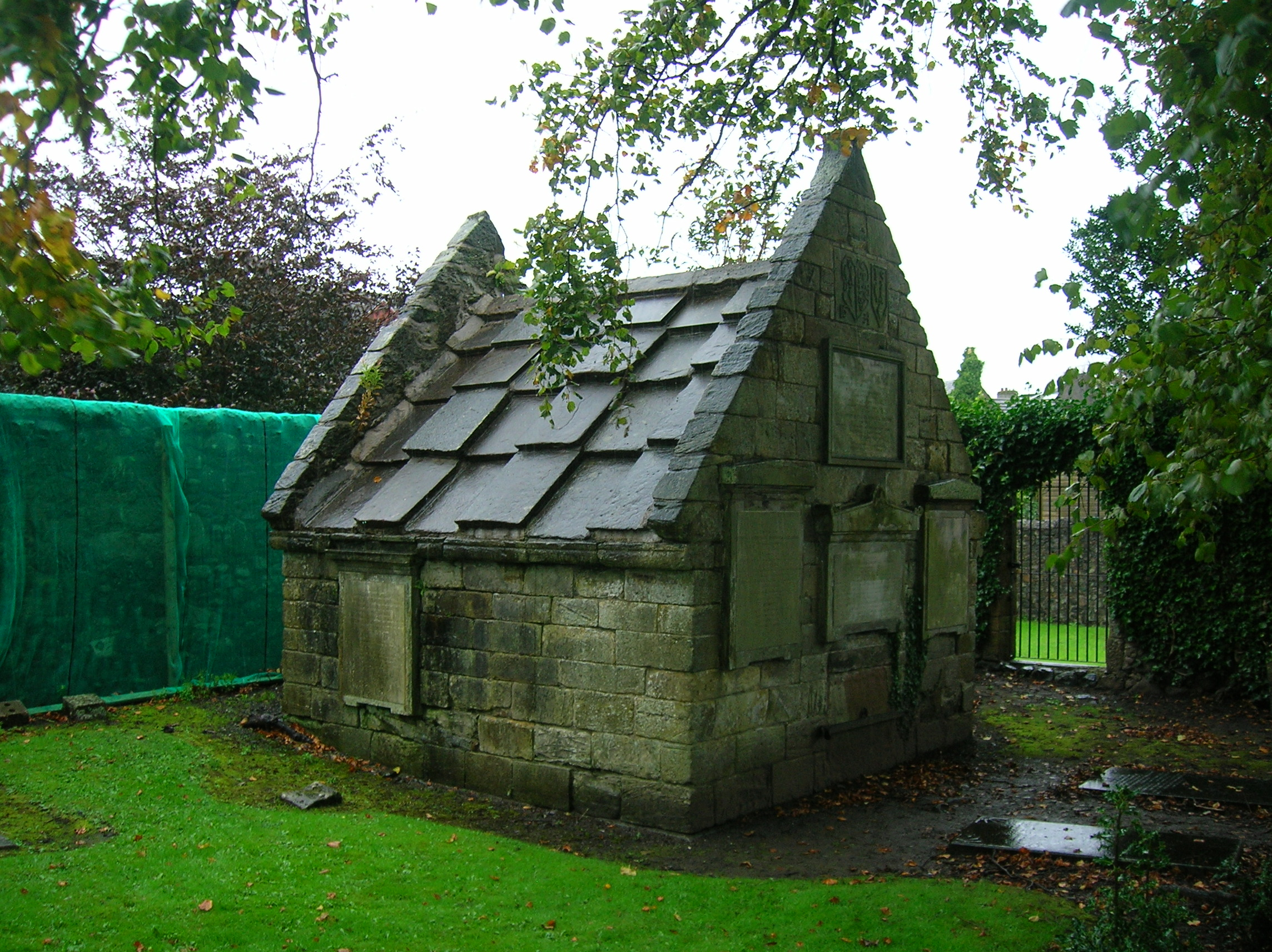
The Brisbane family vault in Largs

When Brisbane returned to Scotland he continued his studies and built a further observatory on his wife's estate, Makerstoun, near Kelso in the Borders. While a member of the Royal Society of Edinburgh and received its Keith Medal in 1848. In 1833 he acted as president of the British Association for the Advancement of Science. He founded a gold medal for the encouragement of scientific research to be awarded by the Royal Society of Edinburgh.

== Death ==
Brisbane died on 27 January 1860 in Largs, Scotland. His four children predeceased him. He is buried in the Brisbane Aisle Vault, which is in the small kirkyard next to the remains of Largs Old Kirk (known as Skelmorlie Aisle).

== Legacy ==
The following features are named after Thomas Brisbane:

- Brisbane, the Australian state of Queensland's largest city and capital (Note: The city of Brisbane, California, may in turn have been named after Brisbane, Queensland, but the derivation is disputed.)
- Brisbane River in Queensland, Australia
- Brisbane, a crater on the Moon
- Brisbane Street, Greenock
- Brisbane Street, Hobart, Tasmania
- Brisbane Street, Perth, Western Australia
- Brisbane Water, an estuary on the Central Coast of New South Wales
- Sir Thomas Brisbane Planetarium, located in Brisbane, Queensland
- Noddsdale, the glen near Largs where his birthplace Brisbane House was situated, was renamed Brisbane Glen in his honour.
- Isabella Plains, a suburb in Canberra, named in honour of Isabella Brisbane, a daughter of Sir Thomas
- Brisbane House Hotel in Largs, a town located by the sea in North Ayrshire, Scotland
- Thomas Makdougall Brisbane bridge in Largs
- Makdougall Brisbane prize of the Royal Society of Edinburgh

Many other uses of Brisbane derive from the Australian city and hence are indirectly named after Thomas Brisbane.

== See also ==
- Historical Records of Australia

== Notes ==
Government offices
Preceded by Lachlan Macquarie	Governor of New South Wales; 1821–1825	Succeeded by Ralph Darling
Baronetage of the United Kingdom
New title	Baronet (of Brisbane, Ayrshire); 1836–1860	Extinct
Preceded by Walker baronets	Brisbane baronets of Brisbane, Ayrshire; 23 February 1836	Succeeded by Bethune baronets
