= Valentine Jenkin =

English decorative painter

Valentine Jenkin or Jenkins was an English decorative painter working in Scotland in the 17th century.

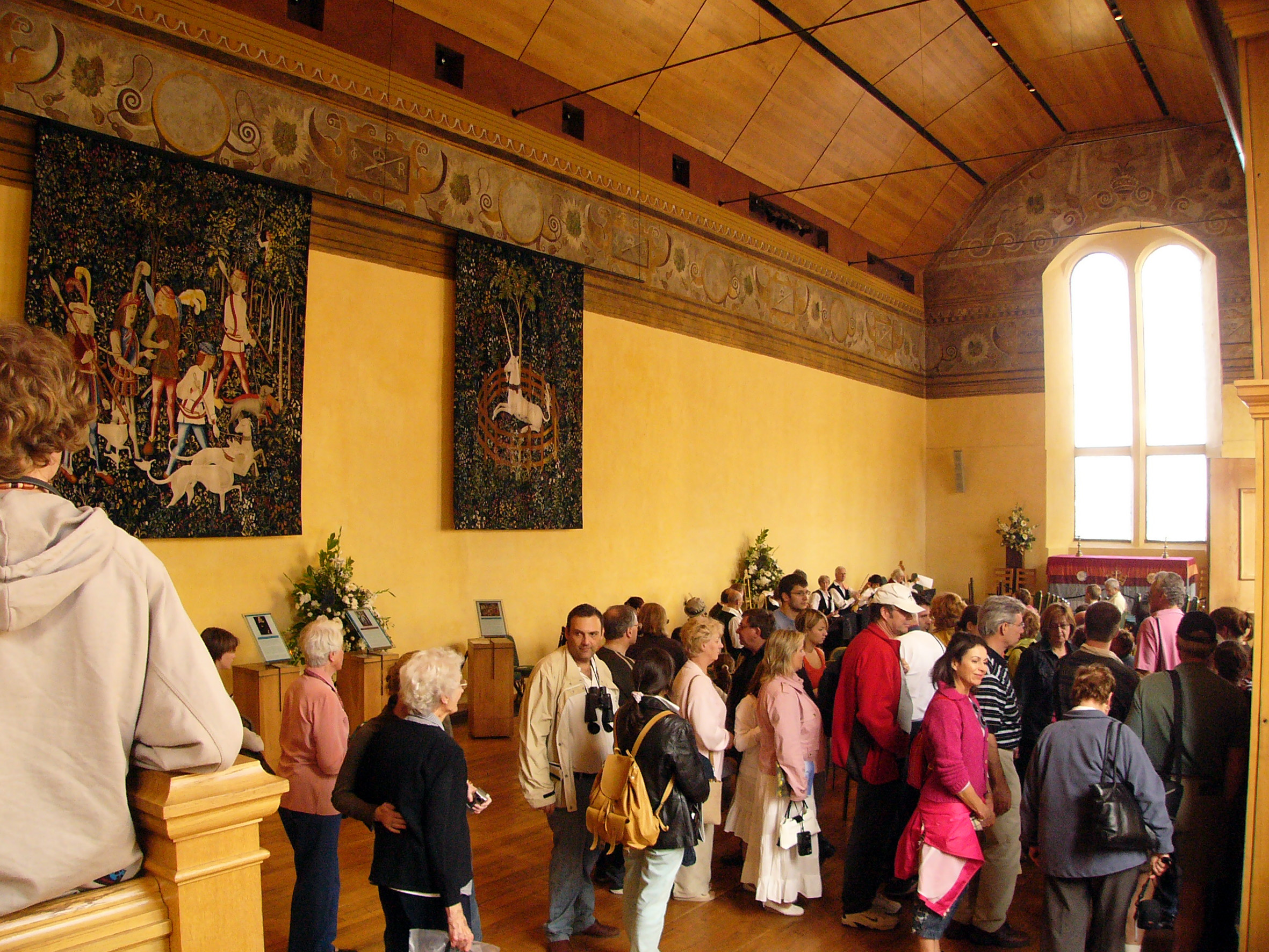
Chapel Royal at Stirling Castle showing the frieze or border painted by Valentine Jenkin in 1628.

== Works ==
Accounts of his work mention that he was an "English man". He was a burgess of Glasgow. In 1627 he painted the globe and the weather vane of the steeple at the Glasgow Tolbooth.

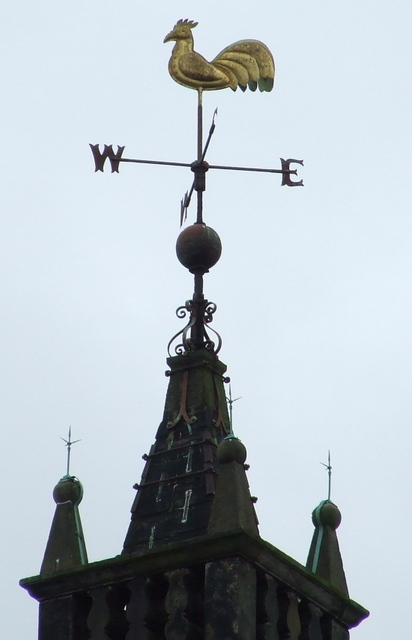
Valentine Jenkins painted and gilded the weathervane of the Glasgow Tolbooth in 1627

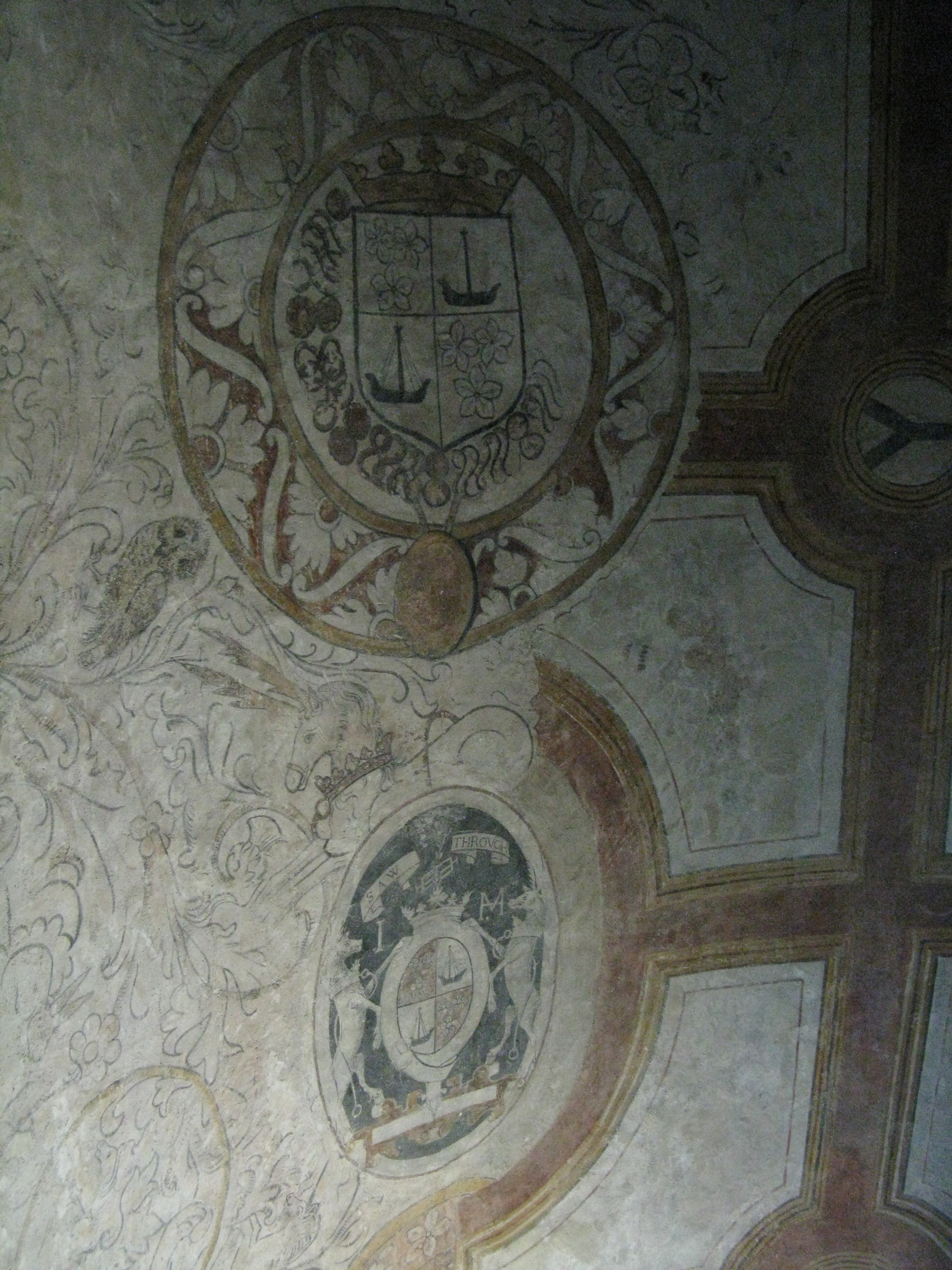
At Kinneil, heraldic painting attributed to Valentine Jenkin is shown as a palimpsest with earlier work.

Jenkins redecorated the Chapel Royal at Stirling Castle in 1628, refreshing painted decoration from 1594 inside and out. Within the chapel, a painted frieze with festoons of leaves and fruit and (now blank) medallions, is his work. The frieze was described in 1628 as a "course of panels, arms, and badges conform to the roof and border". The painted freize is visible (with some restoration) within the chapel. It includes an "IR6" monogram for James VI. External paintwork has left discernible traces and shadows on the courtyard façade.

Materials bought for Jenkin and his team of painters at Stirling in 1617 included, red lead, florey (a kind of indigo), umber, linseed oil, skins for making glue size, butter, and jars called "pigs". In 1628 he was bought chalk, oil, and colours.

Jenkin made two contracts for painting the rooms of the palace of Stirling Castle and the Chapel Royal in 1628. On the exterior of the palace he gilded and painted the royal initials and crowns, and painted the window grills or yetts with red oil paint. Details on the gatehouse and its coat of arms were painted the same. Inside, the window shutters were painted, and he restored the existing painted borders and royal ciphers. He marbled the chimneys. The queen's bedchamber was to be "fair wrought with arms and antiques" according to the ceiling details. He also painted the rooms and passages on the floor above, including two rooms for the Duke of Buckingham which were above the king's bedchamber, accessible via a private stair. The upstairs rooms were painted gray and white, with imitation panelling in the passages. Nothing survives of this work, although nearly all the rooms mentioned in Jenkin's contract survive.

=== Falkland Palace ===
Jenkin rode from Stirling to paint and gild three great carved oak heraldic panels for the exterior of the gate house of Falkland Palace in 1629. The wooden armorials today are 19th-century replacements.

=== Kinneil House ===
A vaulted first-floor room at Kinneil House, known as the Arbour Room, was redecorated around the year 1620 for James Hamilton, 2nd Marquess of Hamilton and his wife Ann Cunningham. Her "shakefork" and the rabbit supporters of Cunningham heraldry can still be seen. This painting was almost certainly the work of Valentine Jenkins, who worked for the family elsewhere.

== Heraldic manuscript ==
The 19th-century writers on genealogy and heraldry R. R. Stodart and G. Harvey Johnston refer to a manuscript known as the "Valentine Jenkins' Collection" or the Armes of "Vallentyn Jenkyns" in connection with family of Hamilton of Innerwick. Compiled between 1640 and 1645, the manuscript was later owned and used by another 17th-century Edinburgh painter and herald, Joseph Stacie (1625–1686), and is now held by the Lord Lyon office in Edinburgh. Stacie, originally from Nottingham, also acquired an armorial manuscript compiled by James Workman and another from the widow of John Sawers (National Library of Scotland Adv. MS 31.4.4).

There were several painters at work in Scotland at the time, and Andrew Home was recorded as Jenkins' assistant at Stirling. Some decorative painters based in London worked in Scotland, including Edward Arthur, George Crawford, and Matthew Goodrick.
