= Brisbane Aisle =

Burial vault in North Ayrshire, Scotland

Coordinates: 55.7948°N 4.8689°W

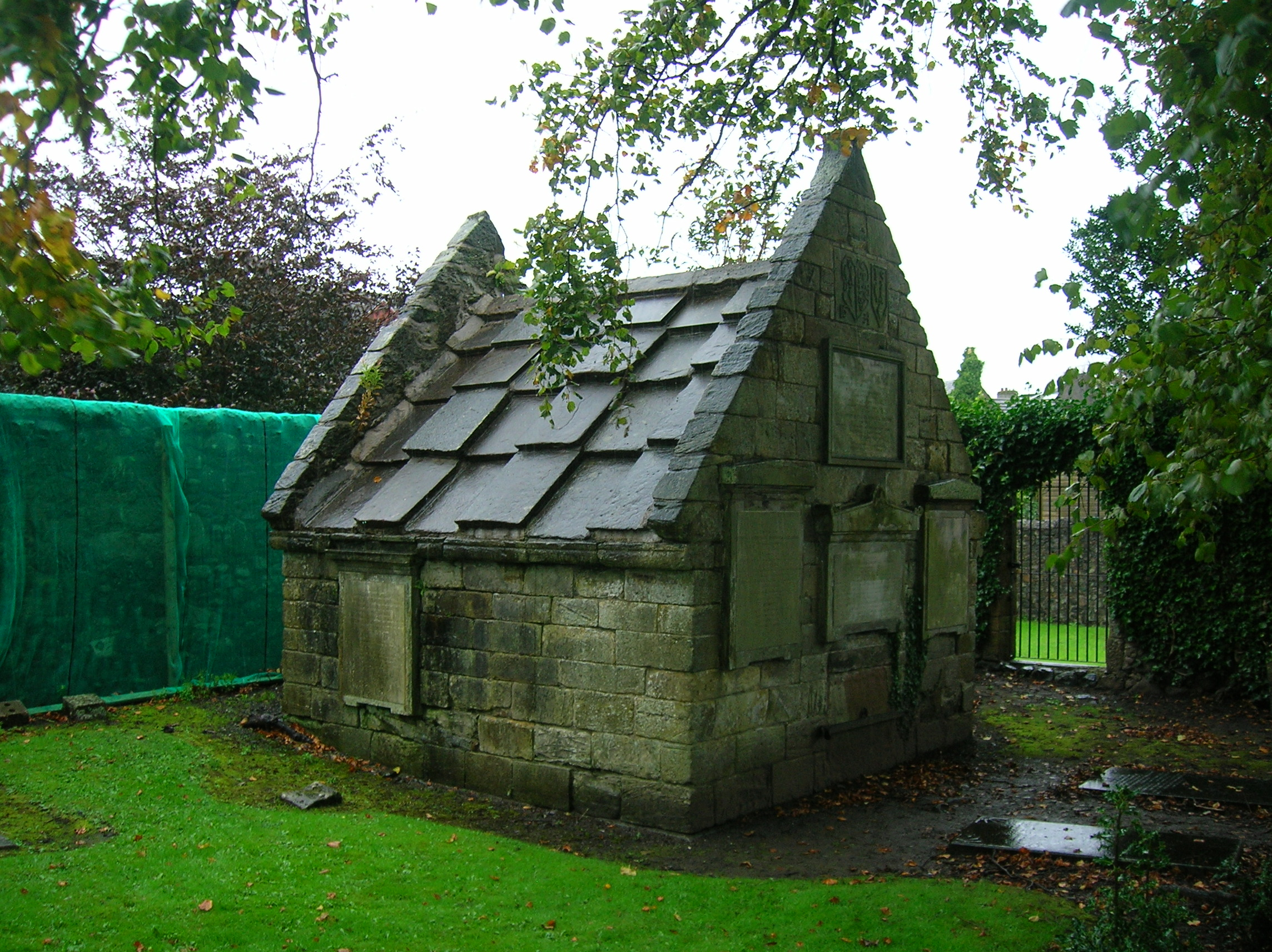
The Brisbane Aisle

The Brisbane Aisle (NS 220247, 659447) is a small 17th century free-standing burial vault, built for the Shaws of Kelsoland (aka Brisbane) and situated in the grounds of the 'Largs Old Kirk', Largs, Ayrshire, Scotland.

== History ==
Built for the Shaws of Kelsoland, this category A listed building became the burial vault of the Brisbane family sometime after 1695. The date 1634 as inscribed on a heraldic datestone at the east side of the structure, above a sealed portal. A heraldic panel is inscribed with "P.S" and "I.S", indicating the Shaws of Kelsoland. An armorial device with mullets (stars) for the Shaw and annulets (rings) for the Montgomeries of Braidstone is present. A carved armorial device on the west side carries the initials "P.S./I.M./I.S". Major-General Sir Thomas Makdougall Brisbane, 1st Baronet GCH, GCB, FRS, FRSE (23 July 1773 – 27 January 1860) a British soldier, colonial governor and astronomer, is interred within the aisle.

=== Description ===
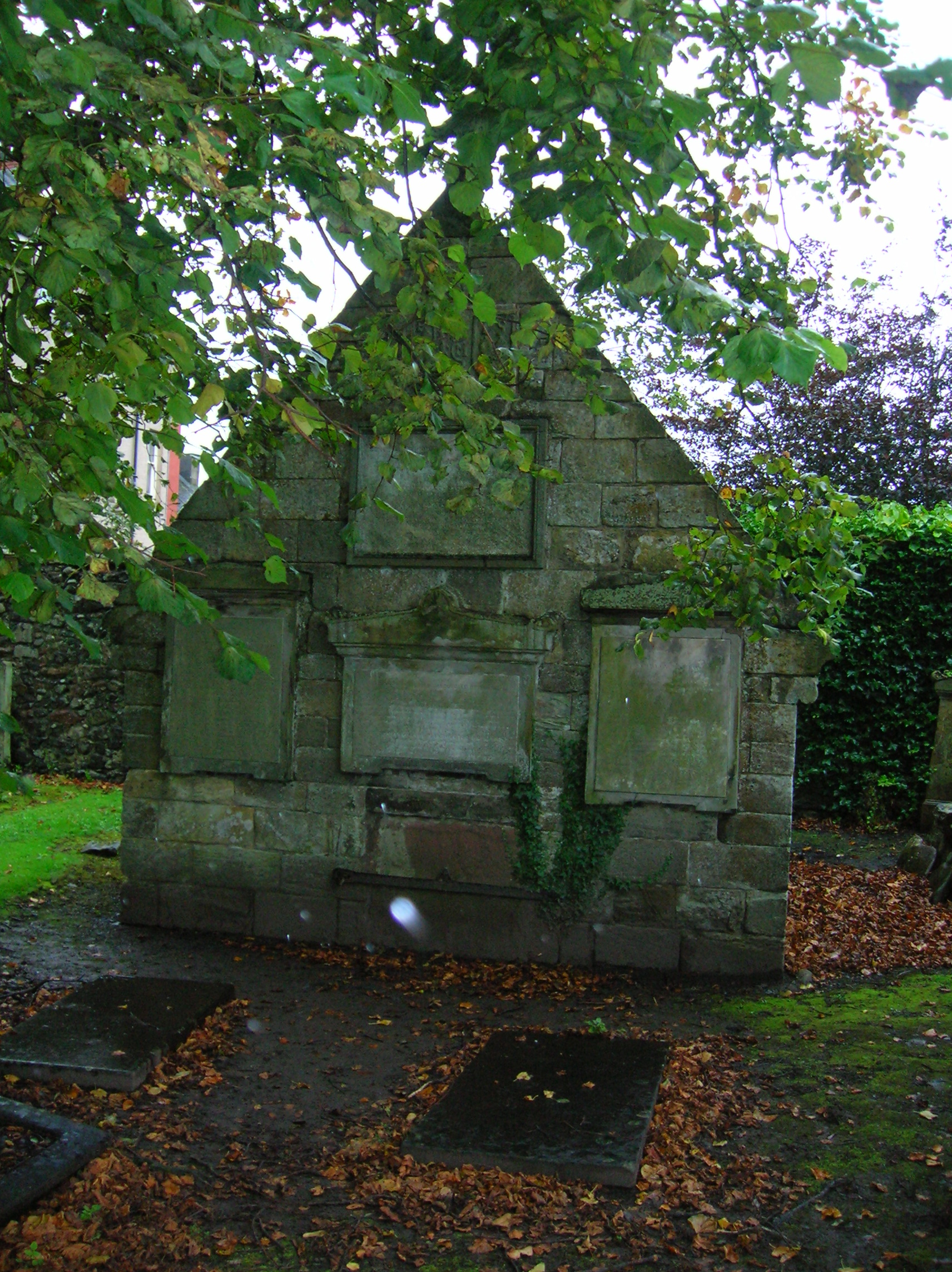
The east facing gable end with memorial slabs.

The aisle is small and rectangular in plan, gabled, with finely squared ashlar masonry, bolection moulding at the wallhead, and cavetto moulded skewputts and apex stones. The east-facing gable carries 19th-century exterior wall-mounted marble memorial panels with block pediments. The striking slab roof is at a lower pitch than the steeply pitched gable ends, probably as a result of repairs.

== The Skelmorlie Aisle ==
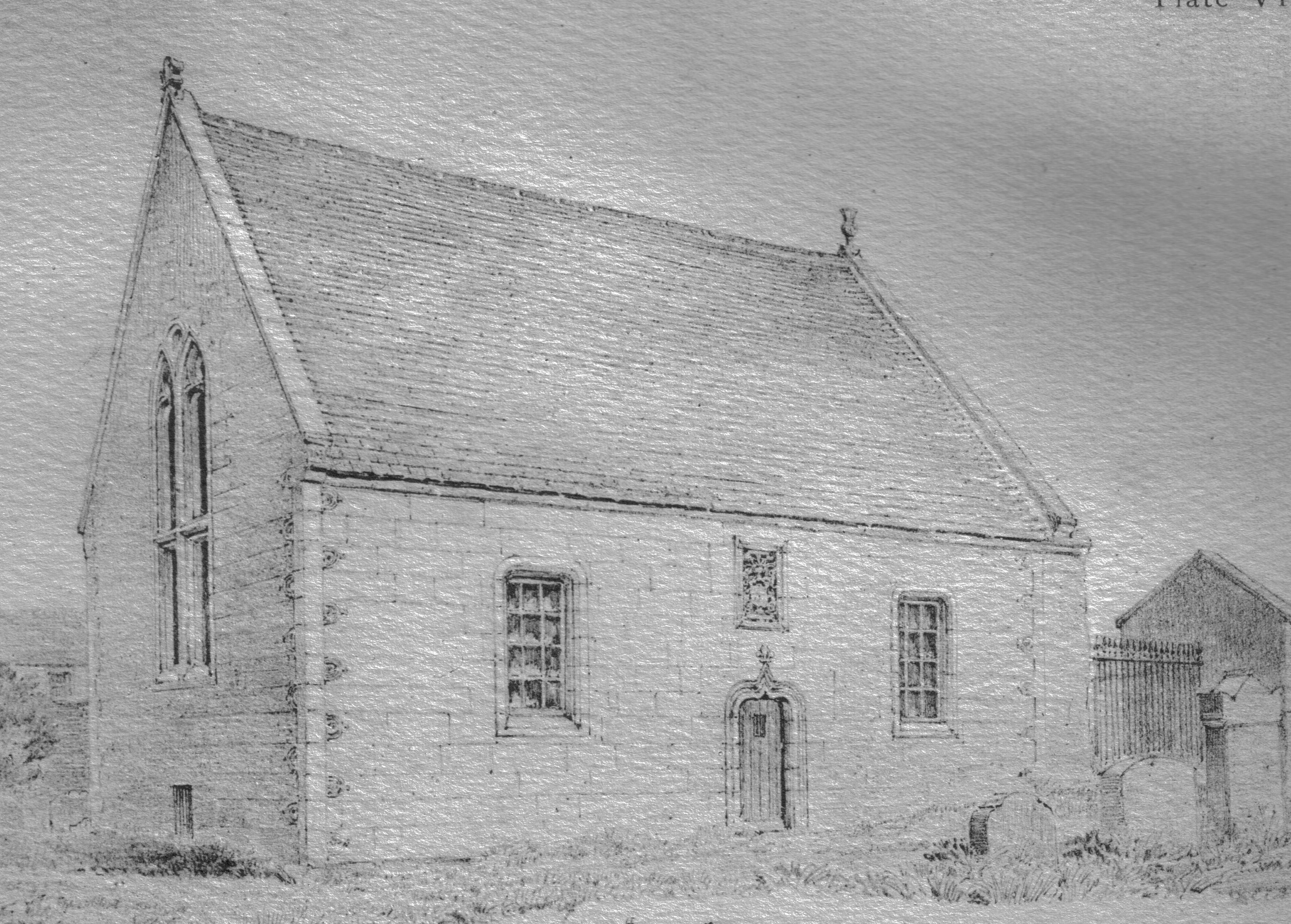
The nearby Skelmorlie Aisle in the 1880s.

The Skelmorlie Aisle stands to the east of the Brisbane Aisle, also a category A listed building and containing a notable monument built by a local landowner, Sir Robert Montgomerie of Skelmorlie Castle, seventh laird of Skelmorlie as a burial site for himself and his wife, Dame Margaret Douglas. The aisle was added to the old kirk (church) of Largs in 1636.

== Access ==
The nearby Skelmorlie Aisle is in the care of Historic Scotland. Admission to the Brisbane Aisle is free; both the kirkyard and museum are open from late May to early September from 2.00pm to 5.00pm.
