= Charles C. Platt Homestead =

Historic house in New York, United States

- U.S. National Register of Historic Places
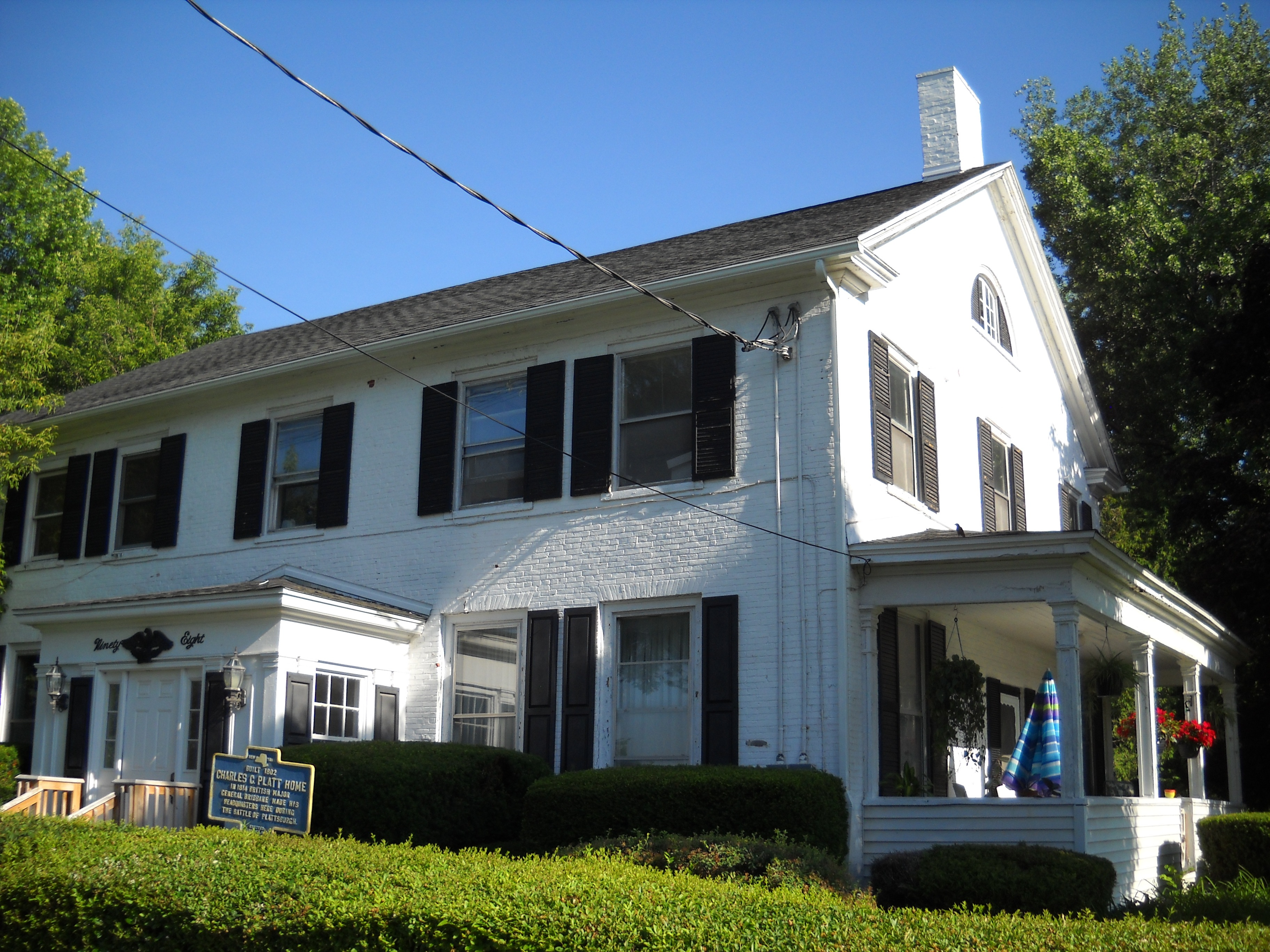
- Charles C. Platt Homestead

- Location within New York Location within the United States
- Location: 96-98 Boynton Ave., Plattsburgh, New York
- Coordinates: 44°42′30″N 73°27′40″W
- Area: less than one acre
- Built: c1802
- Architect: Platt, Charles C.
- Architectural style: Federal
- MPS: Plattsburgh City MRA
- NRHP reference No.: 82001109
- Added to NRHP: November 12, 1982

Charles C. Platt Homestead is a historic home located at Plattsburgh in Clinton County, New York. It was built about 1802 and is a two-story, rectangular plan dwelling on a stone foundation in the Federal style. It features a one-story, gable roof rear wing with a board and batten wing behind. In 1814, it was used as the headquarters for Major-General Sir Thomas Macdougall Brisbane during the Battle of Plattsburgh.

It was listed on the National Register of Historic Places in 1982.
