= List of listed buildings in Glasgow/2 =

This is a list of listed buildings in Glasgow, Scotland.

== List ==
Name	Location	Date listed	Grid ref. (Note: Sometimes known as OSGB36, the grid reference (where provided) is based on the British national grid reference system used by the Ordnance Survey. • "Guide to National Grid". Ordnance Survey. • "Get-a-map". Ordnance Survey.)	Geo-coordinates	Notes	LB number (Note: Historic Environment Scotland assign a unique alphanumeric identifier to each designated site in Scotland, for listed buildings this always begins with "LB", for example "LB12345".)	Image
85 West George Street, 79 Nelson Mandela Place And West Nile Street				55°51′43″N 4°15′17″W	Category B	33221	Upload another image
215-221 (Odd Nos) West George Street And 110-116 (Even Nos) West George Lane				55°51′45″N 4°15′39″W	Category B	33229	Upload Photo
239-247 (Odd Nos) West George Street				55°51′46″N 4°15′42″W	Category B	33231	Upload Photo
19-30 (Excluding Nos 23, 23A, 23B, 26A) St Vincent Crescent And 21 Corunna Street				55°51′48″N 4°17′00″W	Category A	33128	Upload Photo
31-70 (Excluding Nos 35A,36A,37A,39A) St Vincent Crescent And 30 Corunna Street				55°51′51″N 4°17′20″W	Category A	33129	Upload Photo
67-79 (Odd Nos) St Vincent Street, 10-14 (Even Nos) Drury Street				55°51′40″N 4°15′21″W	Category B	33133	Upload another image
101-103A (Odd Nos) St Vincent Street And 19-25 (Odd Nos) Renfield Street And 4, 6 And 6A St Vincent Lane				55°51′41″N 4°15′26″W	Category B	33136	Upload another image
185, 187 St Vincent Street				55°51′43″N 4°15′43″W	Category B	33145	Upload Photo
217-245A (Odd Nos) St Vincent Street And 79 Blythswood Street, 128 St Vincent Lane				55°51′43″N 4°15′47″W	Category B	33149	Upload Photo
200 St Vincent Street				55°51′44″N 4°15′39″W	Category A	33162	Upload another image
260-280 (Even Nos) St Vincent Street, 95-101 (Odd Nos) Douglas Street And 124 Pitt Street				55°51′45″N 4°15′52″W	Category B	33167	Upload Photo
1-27 (Inclusive Nos) Sandyford Place (Sauchiehall Street), 141-149(Odd Nos) Elderslie Street Including Low Wall With Railings Between Service Road To Sandyford Place And Sauchiehall Street				55°51′56″N 4°16′48″W	Category B	33169	Upload Photo
183-209 (Even Nos) Kent Road With 998-1004 (Even Nos) Argyle Street				55°51′50″N 4°16′50″W	Category B	33079	Upload Photo
8-20 (Even Nos) Minerva Street And 995-1017 (Odd Nos) Argyle Street (Finnieston)				55°51′49″N 4°16′56″W	Category B	33085	Upload Photo
1-17 (Inclusive Nos) Newton Terrace, Sauchiehall Street, 128 Elderslie Street And 33 Granville Street				55°51′57″N 4°16′29″W	Category B	33092	Upload Photo
206 - 212 (Even Nos) Old Dumbarton Road, Former Bishop Mills				55°52′06″N 4°17′57″W	Category B	33096	Upload Photo
221 Renfrew Street, Garnetbank Primary School And Janitor's House				55°51′59″N 4°16′02″W	Category B	33107	Upload another image
23, 25 Rose Street, St Aloysius' Church (Roman Catholic)				55°51′59″N 4°15′42″W	Category A	33115	Upload another image
41-47 (Odd Nos) Rose Street And 29, 31 Buccleuch Street				55°52′02″N 4°15′41″W	Category B	33116	Upload Photo
1-24 (Inclusive Nos) Royal Crescent With 1 North Claremont Street And 36 Kelvingrove Street				55°51′57″N 4°16′59″W	Category B	33120	Upload another image
2-30 (Even Nos) St George's Road, 540-546 (Even Nos) Sauchiehall Street And 357,359 Renfrew Street, Charing Cross Mansions				55°52′00″N 4°16′14″W	Category A	33127	Upload another image See more images
11-27 (Odd Nos) Elmbank Street				55°51′49″N 4°16′07″W	Category B	33021	Upload Photo
1-17 (Inclusive Nos) Fitzroy Place And 85 Claremont Street (Sauchiehall Street)				55°51′56″N 4°16′51″W	Category B	33023	Upload Photo
1-25 (Odd Nos) Carfrae Street And 164 And 172 Yorkihill Street, Former Pearson Hall				55°51′53″N 4°17′38″W	Category B	33024	Upload Photo
1-9 (Odd Nos) Gordon Street And 101-111 (Odd Nos) Buchanan Street				55°51′37″N 4°15′17″W	Category B	33025	Upload Photo
71, 97, 99 Gordon St, And 16, 18, 50 Hope St, Central Station & Hotel, (Former Caledonian Railway Station) With 229-263 (Odd Nos) & 194-240 (Even Nos) Argyle St, 15-19 (Odd Nos) & 12-24 (Even Nos) Midland Street & 9-17 (Odd Nos) Clyde Place				55°51′35″N 4°15′31″W	Category A	33029	Upload another image See more images
72-80 (Even Nos) Gordon Street, Grosvenor Building				55°51′39″N 4°15′28″W	Category A	33034	Upload Photo
Granville Street, Berkeley Street And Kent Road Mitchell Theatre, Formerly St Andrew's Halls				55°51′53″N 4°16′24″W	Category A	33036	Upload Photo
80, 82 Hill Street				55°52′02″N 4°15′53″W	Category C(S)	33042	Upload another image
102-112 (Even Nos) Hill Street, And 37, 39 Garnethill Street, Peel Terrace				55°52′03″N 4°15′57″W	Category A	33044	Upload Photo
15, 17 Hope Street				55°51′32″N 4°15′34″W	Category B	33048	Upload Photo
67 Hope Street (Known As No 55)				55°51′36″N 4°15′34″W	Category B	33051	Upload Photo
91-115 (Odd Nos) Hope Street, 2-14 (Even Nos) Waterloo Street And 1-13 (Odd Nos) Bothwell Street				55°51′38″N 4°15′34″W	Category A	33052	Upload Photo
307-335 (Odd Nos) Hope Street And 91, Cowcaddens Street, Mcconnel's Building				55°52′00″N 4°15′25″W	Category B	33055	Upload another image
160-166 (Even Nos) Hope Street And West Regent Street				55°51′47″N 4°15′27″W	Category C(S)	33058	Upload Photo
170, 172 Hope Street, Lion Chambers				55°51′49″N 4°15′26″W	Category A	33059	Upload another image
226-228 (Even Nos) Hope Street, And 55 Renfrew Street, Hope Street Post Office				55°51′55″N 4°15′24″W	Category B	33060	Upload another image
Kelvingrove Park, Kelvingrove Art Gallery And Museum				55°52′07″N 4°17′26″W	Category A	33071	Upload another image
13 Kelvinhaugh Street, Sandyford-Henderson Memorial Church				55°51′53″N 4°17′09″W	Category B	33075	Upload another image
202-218 (Even Nos) Bath Street, 121 Douglas Street, Adelaide Place (North)				55°51′54″N 4°15′52″W	Category B	32968	Upload Photo
34-56 (Even Nos) Bentinck Street And 46 Gray Street				55°52′01″N 4°17′10″W	Category B	32972	Upload Photo
53-91 (Odd Nos) Berkeley Street, 108, 110 Elderslie Street And 13-17 (Odd Nos) Granville Street				55°51′54″N 4°16′28″W	Category B	32973	Upload Photo
1-7 (Inclusive Nos) Blythswood Square And 112 Douglas Street				55°51′51″N 4°15′48″W	Category B	32975	Upload another image See more images
21-26A (Inclusive Nos) Blythswood Square, 268 West George Street And 177 West Regent Street				55°51′48″N 4°15′52″W	Category B	32978	Upload another image See more images
15-25 (Odd Nos) Bothwell Street				55°51′39″N 4°15′35″W	Category B	32979	Upload Photo
81-107 (Odd Nos) Bothwell Street, 80 Blythswood Street, And 89 West Campbell Street, Scottish Legal Life Assurance Society				55°51′40″N 4°15′45″W	Category B	32982	Upload another image See more images
2-28 (Even Nos) Bothwell Street, 123 Hope Street				55°51′41″N 4°15′32″W	Category A	32983	Upload Photo
54-64 (Even Nos) Broomielaw, 5, 9 Oswald Street				55°51′24″N 4°15′37″W	Category B	32988	Upload Photo
46-60 (Even Nos) Buccleuch Street And 53 Dalhousie Street				55°52′04″N 4°15′47″W	Category B	32990	Upload Photo
71-79 (Odd Nos) Buchanan Street				55°51′35″N 4°15′17″W	Category B	32995	Upload Photo
87, 89 Buchanan Street				55°51′36″N 4°15′17″W	Category B	32997	Upload another image
2-13 (Excluding No 4) Clairmont Gardens				55°52′00″N 4°16′40″W	Category B	33009	Upload Photo
71, 73 Claremont Street And 178 Berkeley Street, Henry Wood Hall, (Sno Centre), Former Trinity Congregational Church				55°51′55″N 4°16′50″W	Category B	33010	Upload Photo
24 Elliot Street And 93 Houldsworth Street (Known As 93 Houldsworth Street)				55°51′44″N 4°16′45″W	Category B	33017	Upload another image
1F Gilmorehill, University Of Glasgow, Chemistry Building (Including Inorganic, Physical, And Organic Chemistry) Former "Institute Of Chemistry"				55°52′19″N 4°17′36″W	Category A	32918	Upload another image
1 Gilmorehill, University Of Glasgow, Hunter Memorial				55°52′19″N 4°17′18″W	Category B	32920	Upload another image
1-13 (Inclusive) Professors' Square And Principal's Residence, University Of Glasgow				55°52′18″N 4°17′27″W	Category B	32926	Upload another image See more images
321-333 (Odd Nos) Argyle Street				55°51′31″N 4°15′43″W	Category C(S)	32939	Upload Photo
1185-1263 (Odd Nos) Argyle Street, Franklin Terrace				55°51′56″N 4°17′14″W	Category B	32946	Upload Photo
1058-1100 Excluding No 1070 (Even Nos) Argyle Street And 4-8 (Even Nos) Kelvingrove Street				55°51′53″N 4°17′01″W	Category B	32954	Upload Photo
2 And 4 Dumbarton Road, Kelvingrove Park, Sunlight Cottages				55°52′14″N 4°17′30″W	Category B	32883	Upload Photo
34-52 (Even Nos) Lawrence Street, 45-49 (Odd Nos) Dowanhill Street, 29-47 (Odd Nos) Havelock Street, 86-90 (Even Nos) Hyndland Street				55°52′24″N 4°18′01″W	Category B	32885	Upload Photo
1-17 (Inclusive Nos) Lilybank Gardens, University Of Glasgow				55°52′28″N 4°17′30″W	Category C(S)	32886	Upload another image
1-4 (Inclusive Nos) Lilybank Terrace, Laurel Park School				55°52′28″N 4°17′24″W	Category B	32887	Upload another image
62-70 (Even Nos) Oakfield Avenue And 63 Gibson Street, Hillhead				55°52′23″N 4°17′09″W	Category C(S)	32888	Upload another image
72-80 (Even Nos) Oakfield Avenue And 70 University Avenue, Hillhead				55°52′22″N 4°17′11″W	Category C(S)	32889	Upload Photo
10-18 (Even Nos) Queen Margaret Drive, 75-81 (Odd Nos) Hamilton Drive And 11, 13 Buckingham Street				55°52′41″N 4°17′16″W	Category C(S)	32901	Upload Photo
53-63 (Odd Nos) Southpark Avenue				55°52′25″N 4°17′11″W	Category B	32905	Upload another image
Southpark Terrace,1-15 (Inclusive Nos)				55°52′29″N 4°17′10″W	Category B	32908	Upload another image
44 Oakfield Avenue And 37 Southpark Avenue, Hillhead High School And Entrance Lodge				55°52′28″N 4°17′07″W	Category B	32909	Upload another image
5-11 (Odd Nos) Turnberry Road With Gatepiers				55°52′32″N 4°18′24″W	Category B	32910	Upload Photo
13, 15 Turnberry Road				55°52′32″N 4°18′25″W	Category B	32911	Upload Photo
1-16 (Inclusive Nos) Buckingham Terrace, 2, 4 Buckingham Street, 1, 3 Ruskin Place (Great Western Road) With Retaining Wall And Piers To Great Western Road				55°52′38″N 4°17′13″W	Category A	32850	Upload Photo
24-31 (Inclusive Nos) Buckingham Terrace, 2 Queen Margaret Drive, 1, 3, 5 Buckingham Street				55°52′40″N 4°17′18″W	Category B	32851	Upload Photo
62 Church Street, 10C Dumbarton Road, Western Infirmary, Outpatients And Dispensary				55°52′20″N 4°17′20″W	Category B	32857	Upload Photo
33, 35 Dumbarton Road, Partick Sewage Pumping Station				55°52′11″N 4°17′45″W	Category B	32862	Upload another image
271-285 (Odd Nos) Dumbarton Road				55°52′14″N 4°18′16″W	Category B	32863	Upload Photo
383-405 (Odd Nos) Dumbarton Road, 2-10 (Even Nos) Vine Street And 1 Merkland Street				55°52′14″N 4°18′31″W	Category B	32865	Upload Photo
2-8 (Even Nos) North Gardner Street And 28-30 (Even Nos) Partickhill Road				55°52′27″N 4°18′19″W	Category B	32868	Upload Photo
2-28 (Even Nos) Granby Terrace, Hillhead Street				55°52′34″N 4°17′13″W	Category B	32870	Upload another image
1-33 (Odd Nos) Hamilton Drive, Kelvinside				55°52′36″N 4°17′00″W	Category B	32873	Upload Photo
35-51 (Odd Nos) Hamilton Drive (1-9 Inclusive Nos) Northpark Terrace, Kelvinside				55°52′39″N 4°17′09″W	Category A	32874	Upload Photo
53-67 (Odd Nos) Hamilton Drive And 6 Buckingham Street With Boundary Walls, Gatepiers, Garden Steps And Balustrading				55°52′39″N 4°17′11″W	Category B	32875	Upload Photo
2-30 (Even Nos) Hamilton Drive And 21 Hamilton Park Avenue				55°52′38″N 4°17′00″W	Category C(S)	32876	Upload Photo
45-67 (Odd Nos) Queen Street, The Guild Hall				55°51′33″N 4°15′10″W	Category B	32815	Upload Photo
73-87 (Odd Nos) Queen Street Including 77 A-D Queen Street (South Exchange Court) And 85 A-D Queen Street (Royal Exchange Court)				55°51′35″N 4°15′10″W	Category B	32817	Upload Photo
46-48 (Inclusive Nos) St Andrews Square				55°51′17″N 4°14′37″W	Category B	32832	Upload Photo
17-29 (Odd Nos) St Vincent Place, Scottish Provident Institution				55°51′39″N 4°15′10″W	Category A	32836	Upload another image
31-39 (Odd Nos) St Vincent Place				55°51′39″N 4°15′12″W	Category B	32837	Upload another image
12-16 (Even Nos) St Vincent Place, Anchor Building				55°51′41″N 4°15′08″W	Category A	32839	Upload another image
24 St Vincent Place, Citizen Building				55°51′41″N 4°15′10″W	Category A	32840	Upload another image
30-40 (Even Nos) St Vincent Place, Known As 30 St Vincent Place				55°51′41″N 4°15′11″W	Category A	32841	Upload another image
1-37 (Odd Nos) Banavie Road				55°52′31″N 4°18′43″W	Category B	32847	Upload Photo
97 Hutcheson Street And 14 Garth Street				55°51′34″N 4°14′53″W	Category B	32730	Upload Photo
223-229 (Odd Nos) Ingram Street And 89 Miller Street				55°51′35″N 4°15′03″W	Category B	32737	Upload Photo
10-20 (Even Nos) Ingram Street And 19-23 (Odd Nos) College Street				55°51′34″N 4°14′31″W	Category C(S)	32738	Upload Photo
98 Ingram Street, Ramshorn Theatre, Former St Paul's And St David's Church, (Church Of Scotland) And Churchyard And Boundary Railings				55°51′35″N 4°14′42″W	Category A	32740	Upload another image
3-39 (Odd Nos) Trongate 2 Saltmarket 5-7 (Odd Nos) Chisholm Street				55°51′23″N 4°14′41″W	Category B	32768	Upload Photo
71 Trongate, Tron Steeple				55°51′25″N 4°14′44″W	Category A	32769	Upload another image
79-83 (Odd Nos) Trongate And 5-11 (Odd Nos) King Street				55°51′25″N 4°14′46″W	Category B	32771	Upload Photo
167 Trongate				55°51′25″N 4°14′55″W	Category B	32778	Upload Photo
173-187 (Odd Nos) Trongate And 17-43 (Odd Nos) Stockwell Street And 118-122 (Even Nos) Osborne Street				55°51′25″N 4°14′57″W	Category B	32779	Upload another image
20-46 (Even Nos) Trongate And 2-58 (Even Nos) Albion Street And 38-40 (Even Nos) Bell Street				55°51′27″N 4°14′39″W	Category B	32781	Upload Photo
60-90 (Even Nos) Trongate And 19-29 (Odd Nos) Albion Street				55°51′26″N 4°14′45″W	Category A	32782	Upload another image
140-144 (Even Nos) Trongate				55°51′11″N 4°14′49″W	Category B	32787	Upload Photo
54 St Andrews Square And 51 Turnbull Street, Former Central Police Headquarters				55°51′18″N 4°14′39″W	Category B	32792	Upload another image
37-47 (Odd Nos) Virginia Street				55°51′32″N 4°15′01″W	Category A	32795	Upload another image
49-53 (Odd Nos) Virginia Street				55°51′32″N 4°15′00″W	Category A	32796	Upload Photo
32 Walls Street And 7-21 (Odd Nos) Blackfriars Street, 23 Blackfriars Street (Blackfriars Court)				55°51′30″N 4°14′35″W	Category B	32800	Upload Photo
Cathedral Square, Statue Of David Livingstone				55°51′46″N 4°14′11″W	Category B	32655	Upload another image See more images
72 Clyde Street And 135 Bridgegate, Old Fish Market Known As The Briggait				55°51′16″N 4°14′58″W	Category A	32664	Upload another image See more images
Clyde Street And South Portland Street, Suspension Bridge				55°51′18″N 4°15′20″W	Category A	32668	Upload another image
7-13 (Odd Nos) Duke Street				55°51′37″N 4°14′20″W	Category B	32677	Upload another image
15-31 (Odd Nos) Duke Street				55°51′37″N 4°14′19″W	Category B	32678	Upload Photo
7 Garth Street				55°51′33″N 4°14′54″W	Category C(S)	32683	Upload Photo
24 George Square And 12-16 (Even Nos) Anchor Lane				55°51′41″N 4°15′07″W	Category A	32688	Upload another image
George Square, William Ewart Gladstone Statue				55°51′41″N 4°15′00″W	Category B	32695	Upload another image
George Square, Sir John Moore Statue				55°51′39″N 4°14′58″W	Category A	32698	Upload another image See more images
280 George Street And 24 North Frederick Street				55°51′42″N 4°14′55″W	Category B	32710	Upload Photo
33-39 (Odd Nos) Greendyke Street, Former Hide, Skin And Tallow Market				55°51′14″N 4°14′38″W	Category B	32716	Upload Photo
High Street Glasgow Cross The Tolbooth Steeple				55°51′25″N 4°14′37″W	Category A	32717	Upload another image See more images
15-55 (0Dd Nos) High Street And 84-88 (Even Nos) Bell Street				55°51′27″N 4°14′36″W	Category B	32718	Upload Photo
42-47 (Inclusive Nos) Westbourne Gardens				55°52′49″N 4°18′13″W	Category B	32603	Upload Photo
52 Westbourne Gardens, Belhaven - Westbourne Church And Hall, Church Of Scotland				55°52′53″N 4°18′12″W	Category A	32605	Upload Photo
50 Argyle Street With 3 Miller Street				55°51′29″N 4°15′06″W	Category B	32611	Upload Photo
98-102 (Even Nos) Argyle Street				55°51′30″N 4°15′13″W	Category B	32612	Upload Photo
Argyle Street, Argyll Arcade (Through 98-102 Argyle Street) 3-66 (Inclusive Nos, Leading To Buchanan Street)				55°51′30″N 4°15′12″W	Category A	32613	Upload Photo
62 Argyll Arcade, 108 Argyle Street, Morrison Court, David Sloan's Arcade Cafe				55°51′31″N 4°15′13″W	Category A	32614	Upload another image
17 Parson Street, Martyr's School With Retaining Walls And Gates				55°51′55″N 4°14′15″W	Category A	32619	Upload another image
28-32 (Even Nos) Buchanan Street, Argyll Chambers				55°51′32″N 4°15′16″W	Category B	32633	Upload another image
78-90 (Even Nos) Buchanan Street With 9-17 (Odd Nos) Exchange Place				55°51′36″N 4°15′14″W	Category B	32638	Upload Photo
106-112 (Even Nos) Buchanan Street With 1 Royal Bank Place				55°51′38″N 4°15′13″W	Category B	32640	Upload another image
109-123 (Odd Nos) Candleriggs				55°51′33″N 4°14′44″W	Category B	32645	Upload Photo
60-106 (Even Nos) Candleriggs 3-31 (Odd Nos) Bell Street And 69-97 (Odd Nos) Albion Street Candleriggs City Hall And Bazaar				55°51′32″N 4°14′43″W	Category A	32647	Upload another image See more images
1-15 (Inclusive Nos) Princes Gardens				55°52′34″N 4°18′18″W	Category B	32575	Upload another image
Nos 1,5,6,7,8 Queens Gardens, With Gatepiers And Rear Boundary Railings				55°52′36″N 4°17′59″W	Category B	32578	Upload Photo
5-9 (Odd Nos) Redlands Road And Retaining Walls				55°52′53″N 4°17′51″W	Category B	32580	Upload Photo
1-16A (Inclusive Nos) Rosslyn Terrace				55°52′45″N 4°17′48″W	Category B	32581	Upload Photo
17-19 (Inclusive Nos) Rosslyn Terrace, And Gatepiers				55°52′47″N 4°17′52″W	Category C(S)	32582	Upload Photo
6, 6A And 6B Victoria Circus, (Kensington Tower), With Boundary Walls And Gatepiers				55°52′44″N 4°18′04″W	Category B	32593	Upload Photo
10 Victoria Circus, (Ramoyle), With Walls And Gatepiers				55°52′41″N 4°18′06″W	Category B	32594	Upload Photo
6-34 (Even Nos) Victoria Crescent Road With Walls To Crescent Lane				55°52′34″N 4°17′49″W	Category B	32598	Upload Photo
38-52A (Even Nos) Victoria Crescent Road				55°52′37″N 4°17′55″W	Category B	32599	Upload Photo
1A And 2-18A (Inclusive Nos) Westbourne Gardens				55°52′52″N 4°18′09″W	Category B	32600	Upload Photo
20-27 (Inclusive Nos) Westbourne Gardens				55°52′49″N 4°18′03″W	Category B	32601	Upload Photo
28-41 (Inclusive Nos) Westbourne Gardens				55°52′49″N 4°18′05″W	Category B	32602	Upload Photo
22-38 (Even Nos) Kingsborough Gardens				55°52′44″N 4°18′15″W	Category B	32544	Upload Photo
42-54 (Even Nos) Kingsborough Gardens				55°52′42″N 4°18′15″W	Category B	32546	Upload Photo
3 Kirklee Road And 1 Redlands Road				55°52′52″N 4°17′50″W	Category A	32550	Upload Photo
7-23 (Odd Nos) Kirklee Road And 2 Redlands Road, With Walls, Gatepiers And Railings				55°52′54″N 4°17′48″W	Category A	32551	Upload Photo

== Key ==
The scheme for classifying buildings in Scotland is:

- Category A: "buildings of national or international importance, either architectural or historic; or fine, little-altered examples of some particular period, style or building type."
- Category B: "buildings of regional or more than local importance; or major examples of some particular period, style or building type, which may have been altered."
- Category C: "buildings of local importance; lesser examples of any period, style, or building type, as originally constructed or moderately altered; and simple traditional buildings which group well with other listed buildings."

In March 2016 there were 47,288 listed buildings in Scotland. Of these, 8% were Category A, and 50% were Category B, with the remaining 42% being Category C.

== See also ==
- List of listed buildings in Glasgow
