= Skelmorlie Aisle =

Church building in Largs, Ayrshire, Scotland

Coordinates: 55.79475°N 4.86858°W

The Skelmorlie Aisle of Largs Old Kirk is the remains of a church in the town of Largs, Ayrshire, Scotland.

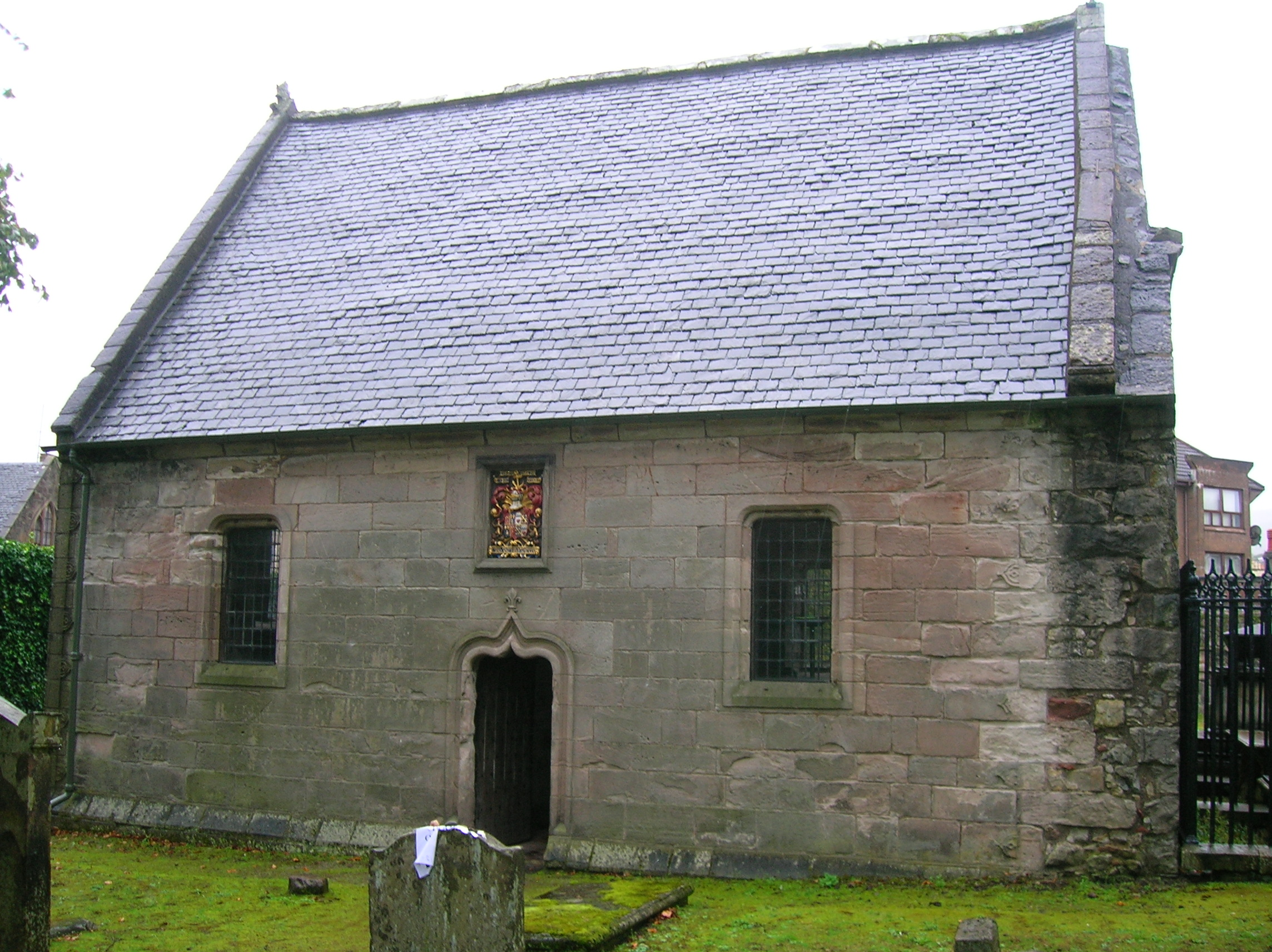
The Skelmorlie Aisle.

== History ==
The majority of the kirk (church) was demolished in 1802 when the new parish church came into use, but the aisle, a division of the once larger building containing the mausoleum, was retained.

=== The Montgomerie tomb ===
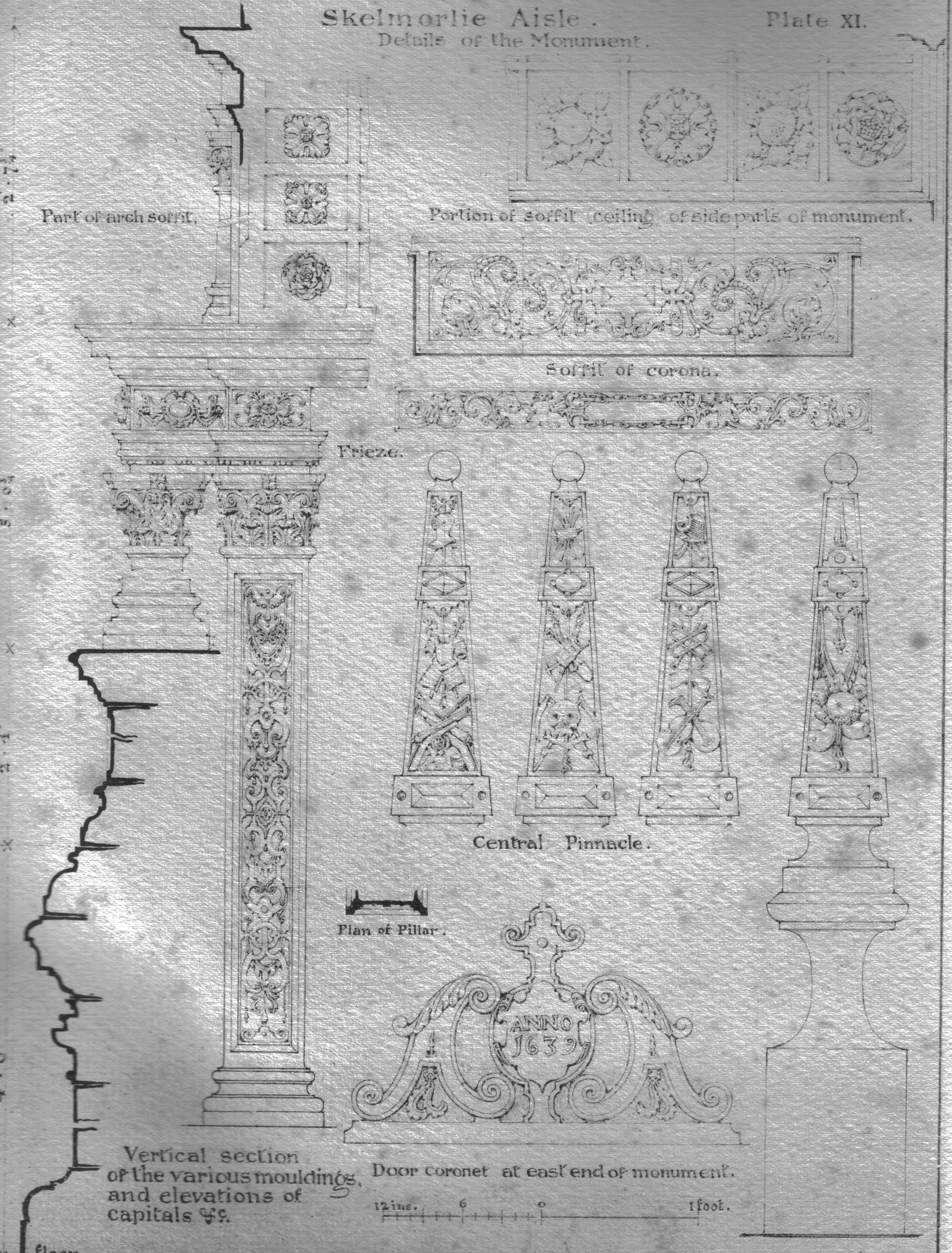
The interior of the aisle.

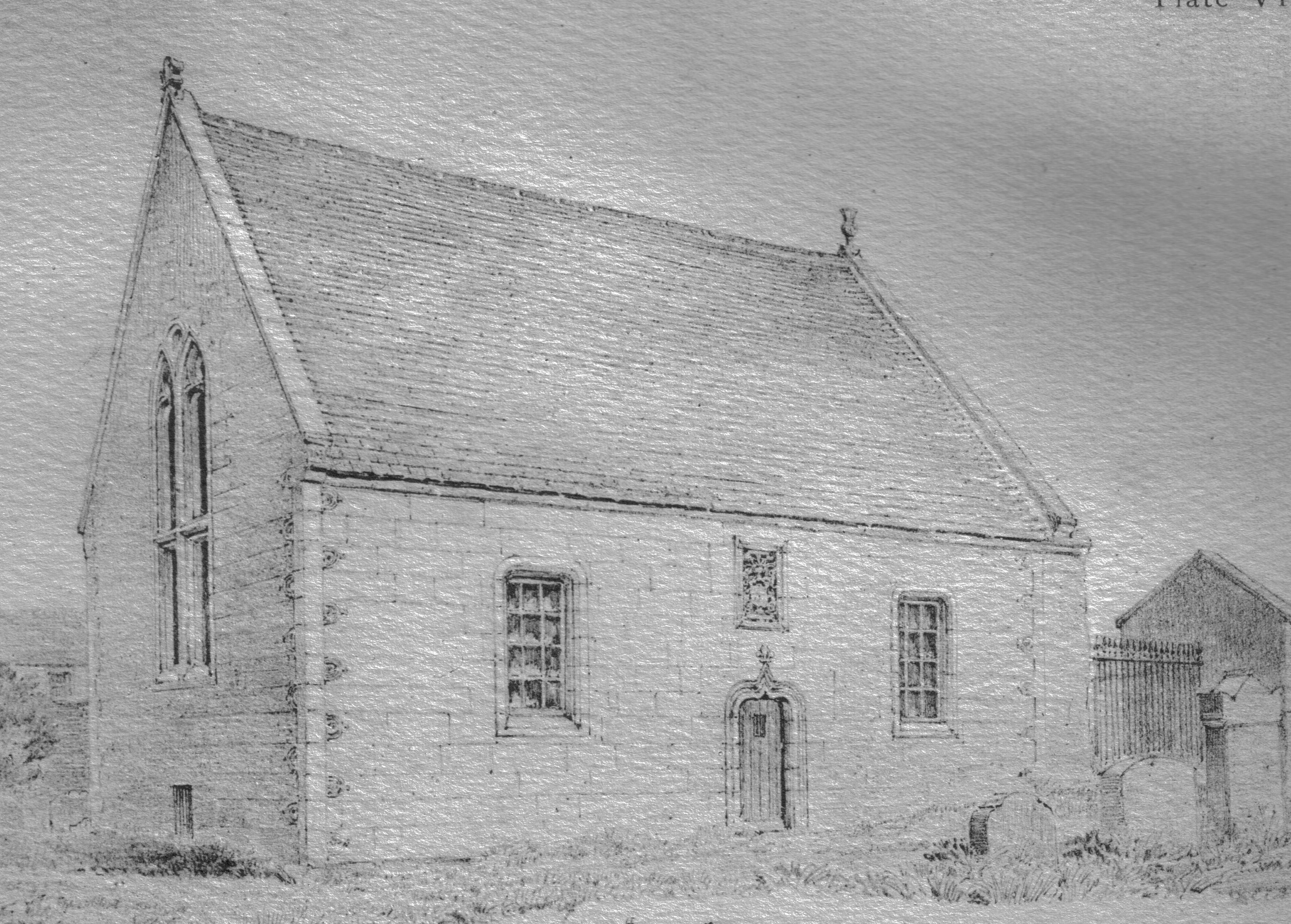
The aisle in the 1880s.

The Skelmorlie Aisle contains a notable monument built by a local landowner, Sir Robert Montgomerie of Skelmorlie Castle, seventh Laird of Skelmorlie, as a burial site for himself and his wife, Dame Margaret Douglas. The aisle was added to the old kirk (church) of Largs in 1636, and comprises a Renaissance canopied tomb above the burial-vault entrance. The barrel vaulted ceiling of the aisle was painted 1638 in panels, with heraldic emblems and signs of the Zodiac, etc. by a Mr. Stalker. A third coffin within the tomb is said to be that of Sir Hugh Montgomerie of Eaglesham, a hero of the Battle of Otterburn. It can be compared with other significant tombs, such as that of the Cunninghames, Earls of Glencairn at Kilmaurs in East Ayrshire.

Sir Robert's coffin is especially long and much of the lead on the bottom of the coffin is missing, supposedly taken by local fishermen who believed that lead weights made from it would result in a large catch of fish.

=== Painted ceiling ===
The painted timber ceiling is signed and dated 1638 by J. Stalker and is in vernacular contrast, albeit the designs are derived from the work of a goldsmith at the French royal court, Etienne Delaune. Lively scenes illustrate the seasons as well as the Montgomerie and Douglas conjoined coat of arms, oddly with the quarters of the Montgomerie arms incorrectly placed as in the Polnoon example. The arms in the panel above the entrance door also have this 'mirror image' arrangement. James Stalker was a former apprentice of an Edinburgh painter, John Sawers. His work seems to be otherwise unrecorded.

== Access ==
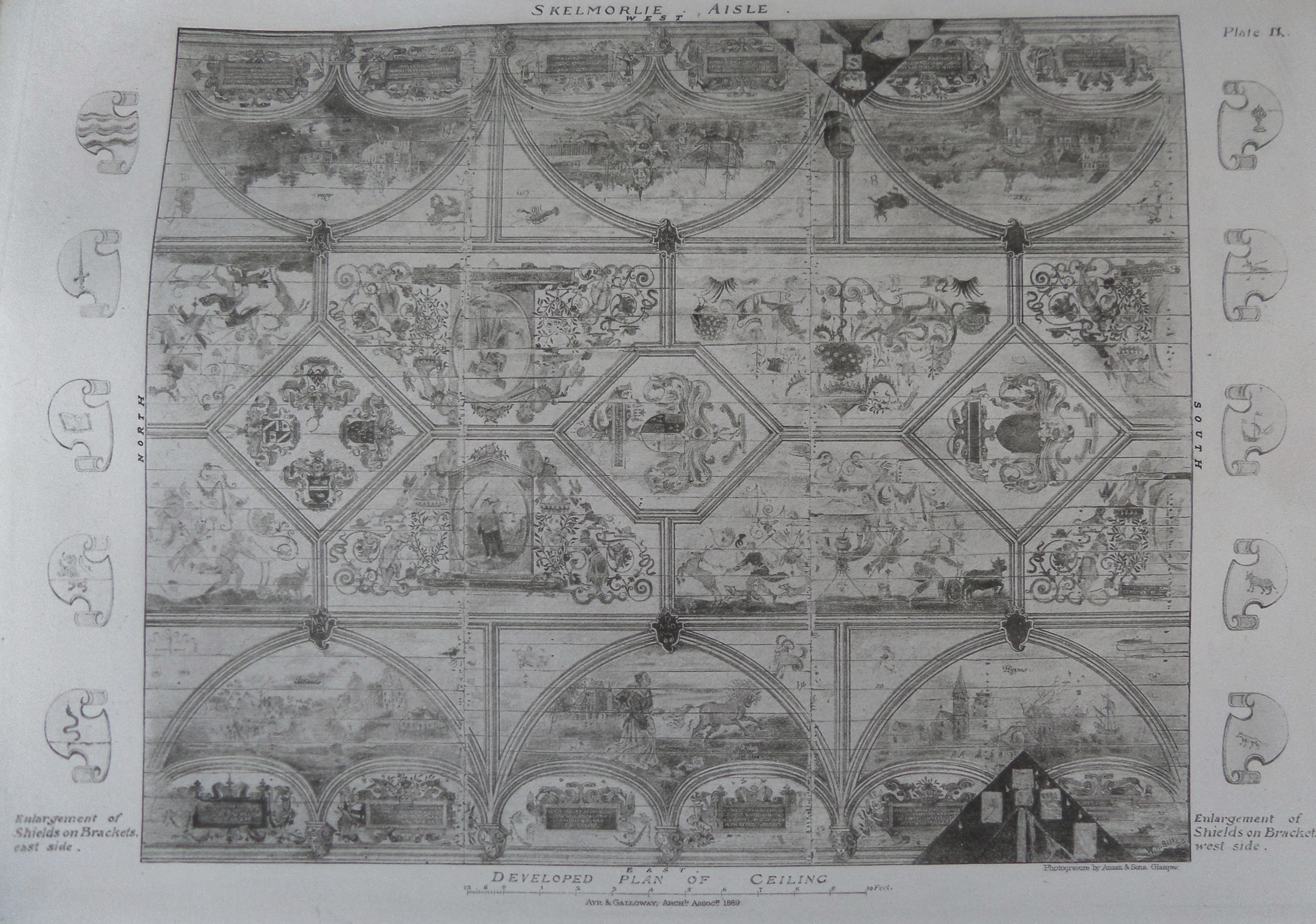
The 1638 painted decorative ceiling.

Today Skelmorlie Aisle is in the care of Historic Environment Scotland. Admission is free, although visitors need to be accompanied by a guide from the adjoining Largs Museum. Both the kirkyard and museum are open from Easter until late September on Thursdays, Fridays, Saturdays, and Sundays from 1:30pm to 4.30pm.

== See also ==
- Brisbane Aisle
- The Queensberry Aisle
- Glencairn Aisle
- Skelmorlie Castle
