= Alexander Sawers =

Scottish footballer

Personal information
- Full name: Alexander Sawers
- Place of birth: Scotland
- Position: Full back

Senior career*
Years	Team	Apps	(Gls)
- Clyde
1892–1893	Burnley	2	(0)
- * Club domestic league appearances and goals

Alexander Sawers was a Scottish professional footballer who played as a full back.
