= William George Black =

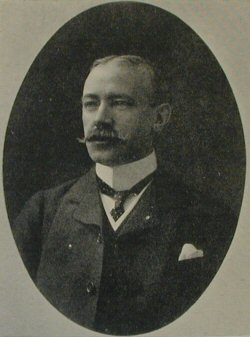
Black in 1909

William George Black CBE (23 December 1857 – 21 December 1932) was a Scottish antiquary, lawyer and politician. He commissioned the mercat cross replica at Glasgow Cross in Glasgow.

== Life ==
The son of a Glasgow solicitor, he was educated at Glasgow University, of which he was honorary LL.D. He contested South Aberdeen in 1906, and the Elgin Burghs and Islington West in 1910 as a Liberal Unionist. He was a member of the Committee of Management of the Philip Stott College (Unionist Association), and was chairman of the Glasgow Good Government League. He travelled widely in India and the Far East. He was a trustee and a member of the executive of the Navy League and chairman of the Glasgow and West of Scotland branch. His First World War work, for which he was made CBE, was especially concerned with V.A.D. committees, disabled officers, and the post-War training of officers.

Black presented to the city of Glasgow in 1930 the re-erected Mercat Cross; he had written works on Scottish mercat crosses. He wrote other works on folk-medicine, Glasgow archaeology, and a description of Heligoland and the islands of the North Sea. His law books included works on Lands Agents Act, local government in Scotland, the parochial ecclesiastical law of Scotland, a digest of decisions in Scottish shipping cases, and the history of teinds. He was F.S.A. (London and Scotland), a former president of the Glasgow Archaeological Society. In Glasgow he was vice-chairman of St Mungo's College and chairman of the Ophthalmic Institution, and was active in other educational and charitable institutions.

His wife, who was a daughter of publisher Robert Blackie died in 1920. His wife's young nephews and nieces found him a tedious adult visitor to their home and they invented this irreverent ditty which could be sung to the tune of "The Ash Grove". "Rejected by Heaven, From Hell given the sack, He came back to Earth, As William George Black"
