= John Sawers (painter) =

Scottish decorative painter

John Sawers (died 1651) was a Scottish decorative painter based in Edinburgh.

== Father and son ==
His father was also an Edinburgh painter, John Sawers (died 1628). John Sawers, elder, was made a burgess of Edinburgh in November 1591, allowing him to practise the craft of painting in the city. He was also recognised as a qualified painter of heraldry by the Court of the Lord Lyon. John Sawers, elder, married firstly, Janet Workman or Warkman, a member of the Workman family of painters. His second wife was Agnes Home. He made a design drawing for a carved stone at the Magdalen Chapel in Edinburgh's Cowgate. He.painted rooms and coats of arms at Edinburgh Castle, and died while working at Linlithgow Palace in 1628. His daughter Janet married Robert Blaikie, another painter. His apprentices included John Stewart, Gilbert Henryson, John Scott, and John Binning.

== John Sawers the younger ==
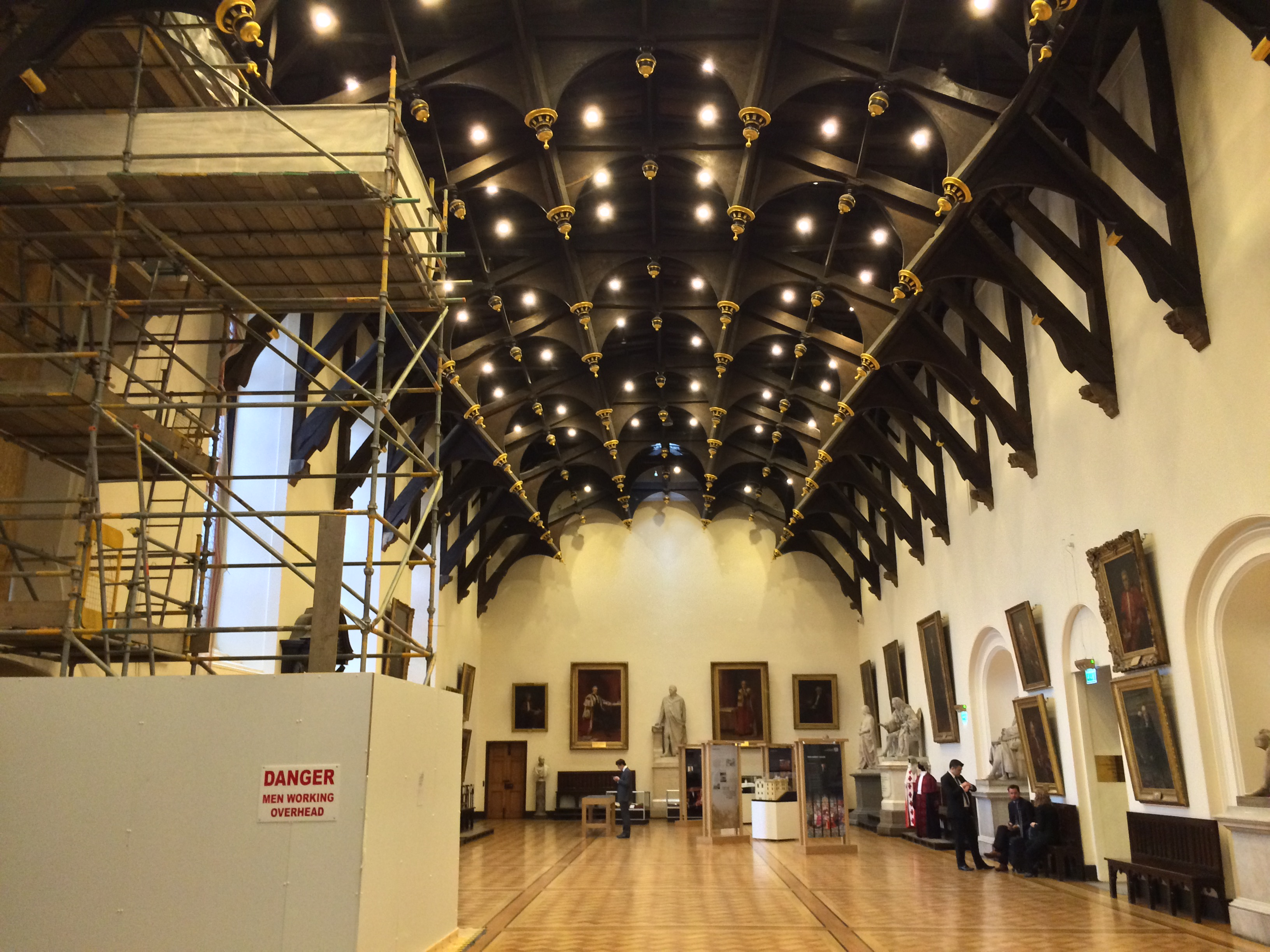
John Sawers painted and gilded the decorative knops of Parliament Hall in Edinburgh.

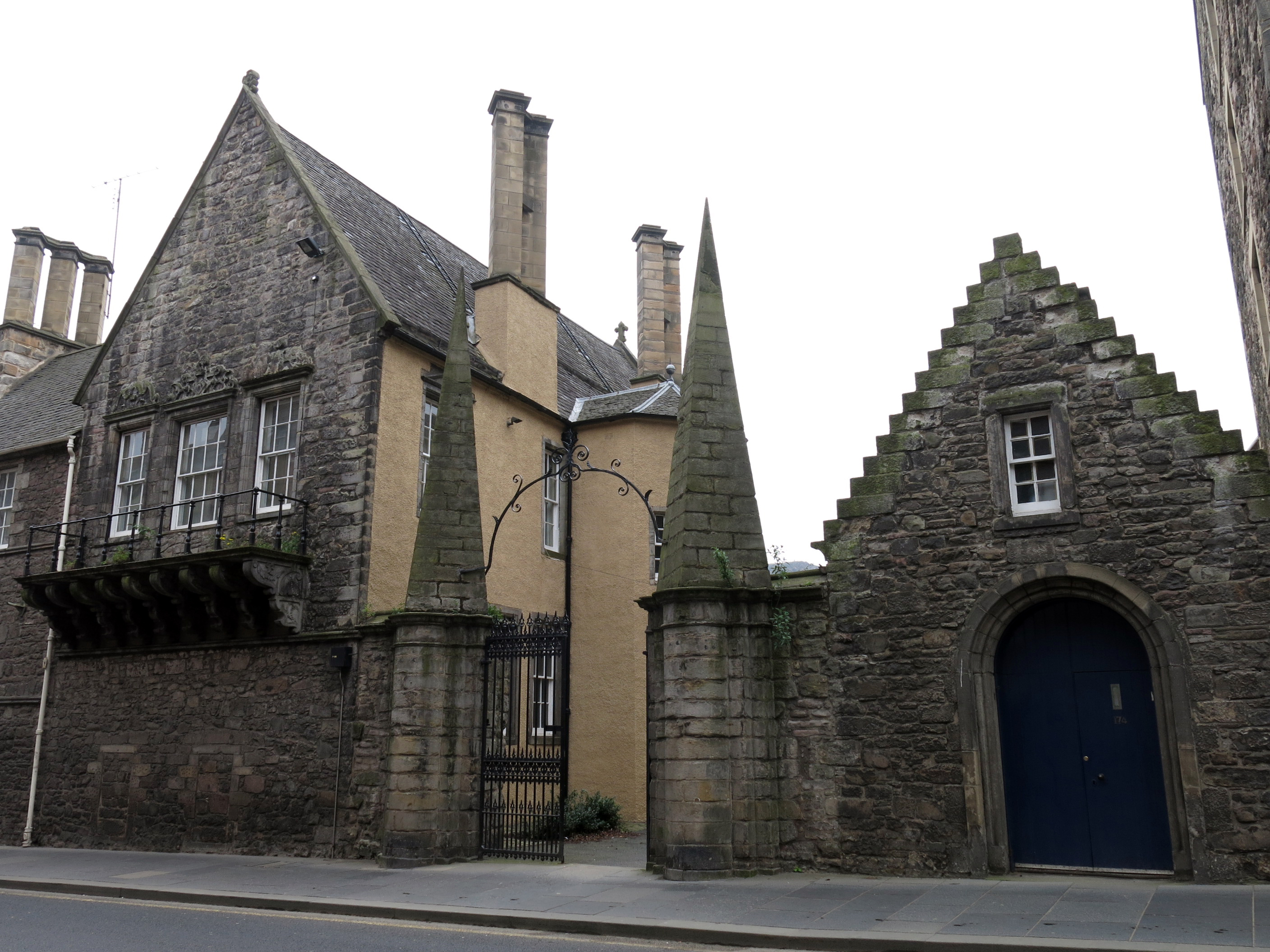
John Sawers painted rooms for the Countess of Home at Moray House

In December 1628 the younger John Sawers was a made a burgess of Edinburgh. He was made a burgess of Glasgow in 1636, after winning a contract to paint the high gallery of the town's tolbooth. Like his father, he worked as a herald painter and was officially titled Carrick Pursuivant and Snowdoun Herald. He made an armorial, a manuscript record of coats of arms, which still survives. Herald painters provided painted funeral trappings, and Sawers painted coats of arms for the funeral of Lady Ann Cunningham, Marchioness of Hamilton in 1647.

In 1617, John Sawers, younger, was one of the painters working at Edinburgh Castle to make it ready for the return visit of James VI and I. He also had a contract for painting rooms at Edinburgh Castle in 1633.

In 1631, he decorated the new balcony rooms at Moray House in the Canongate, recently completed by the mason William Wallace and the plasterer John White for Mary Sutton, Countess of Home. His son-in-law, or brother-in-law, the painter Joseph Stacie (who married an Elspeth Sawers) later decorated the same rooms. Stacie, originally from Nottingham, bought an armorial manuscript compiled by John Sawers from his widow in 1654, (now National Library of Scotland Adv. MS 31.4.4).

Sawers decorated the ceiling of the new building for the Parliament of Scotland, gilding and colouring the pendant knops which can still be seen today. He also worked on the glazing. Craft records show that glaziers and painters often combined their trade.

His apprentices included, Andrew Gibson, James Stalker, Charles Wilson, and Andrew Henryson. James Stalker painted the intricate emblematic ceiling of the Skelmorlie Aisle.
