= List of Royal Navy ships named after saints =

This is a list of ships of the Royal Navy which have had names associated with saints.

== St ==
- HMS St Albans
- HMS St Albans Prize
- HMS St Andrew
- HMS St Angelo
- HMS St Anne
- HMS St Austell Bay
- HMS St Brides Bay
- HMS St Christopher
- HMS St Claude
- HMS St Columba
- HMS St David
- HMS St Dennis
- HMS Saint Eustatius
- HMS St Fermin
- HMS St Fiorenzo
- HMS St Florentine
- HMS St George
- HMS St Helena
- HMS St Jacob
- HMS St James
- HMS St Jean d'Acre
- HMS St John
- HMS St John Prize
- HMS St Joseph
- HMS Katherine
- HMS St Kitts
- HMS St Lawrence
- HMS St Lewis
- HMS St Loe
- HMS St Lucia
- HMS St Martin
- HMS St Mary
- HMS St Matthew
- HMS St Michael
- HMS St Nazaire
- HMS St Nicholas
- HMS St Patrick
- HMS St Paul
- HMS St Peter
- HMS St Philips Castle
- HMS St Pierre
- HMS St Thomas
- HMS St Vincent

== San and Santa ==
- HMS San Antonio
- HMS San Carlos
- HMS San Damaso
- HMS San Domingo
- HMS Santa Dorotea
- HMS San Genaro
- HMS Santa Gertruyda
- HMS San Giorgio
- HMS San Ildefonso
- HMS San Josef
- HMS San Juan
- HMS Santa Leocadia
- HMS San Leon
- HMS Santa Margarita
- HMS Santa Maria
- HMS San Miguel
- HMS Santa Monica
- HMS San Nicolas
- HMS San Rafael
- HMS Santa Teresa
- HMS San Ysidro

== See also ==
- HMS Saintes
