= Charles (disambiguation) =

Charles is an English masculine given name.

Charles may also refer to:

== Arts and entertainment ==
- "Charles" (short story), a short story by Shirley Jackson
- Geet (1944 film) or The Song, a 1944 Bollywood film

== People ==
- Charles (surname)
- Saint Charles (disambiguation), several saints and places named for them
- King Charles (disambiguation), several monarchs and places named for them
- Prince Charles (disambiguation), several princes and places named for them
- Lord Charles (disambiguation), several nobles
- Sir Charles (disambiguation), several nobles and knights

== Places ==
- Charles, Devon, a hamlet in England
- Charles Bridge, Czech Republic
- Charleston (disambiguation), several towns
- Charlestown (disambiguation), several towns
- Charles Town (disambiguation), several towns
- Charles River (disambiguation), several rivers
- Charles Island (disambiguation), several islands
- King Charles's Island, former name of Española Island and Floreana Island, Galapagos Archipelago, Ecuador
- Prince Charles Island, Nunavut, Canada

=== United States ===
- Charles, Providence, Rhode Island
- Charles City, Iowa
- Charles City, Virginia
- Charles County, Maryland
- Charles City County, Virginia
- The Charles, a building in New York City, US

== Science and technology ==
- Charles's law, describing the relationship between the volume and temperature of a gas
- Charles Proxy, an HTTP debugging proxy
- Charles, a lunar crater near Mons La Hire

== Ships ==
- HMS Charles (disambiguation), several ships of the Royal Navy
- USS Charles, a US Navy troop transport 1918–1920
- Charles (1811 ship), a schooner

== Other uses ==
- Charles University, Prague, Czech Republic

== See also ==
- Charles in Charge, an American sitcom television series
- Charles and Diana (disambiguation)
- Charlie (disambiguation), an English diminutive of Charles
- Chuck (disambiguation), an English diminutive of Charles
- Chucky (disambiguation), an English diminutive of Charles
- Carlos (disambiguation), the Spanish and Portuguese form of Charles
- Carlo (disambiguation), the Italian form of Charles
- Karl (disambiguation), the German form of Charles
- Carl (disambiguation), an English and German cognate of Charles
- Karol (disambiguation), the Basque, Scandinavian, Polish, Slovak, and Slovene form of Charles
- Károly (disambiguation), an unrelated name frequently used in Hungarian for the name Charles and its variants
- Charlemagne, a Frankish king whose name means "Charles the Great"
- Charlotte (disambiguation), the feminine form of Charles
