= Carl of Sweden =

Carl of Sweden, Charles of Sweden, or Karl of Sweden may refer to:

== Kings of Sweden ==
- Karl I to Karl VI, invented kings listed in Historia de omnibus Gothorum Sueonumque regibus
- Charles VII of Sweden (c. 1130 – 1167; r. 1161–1167)
- Charles VIII of Sweden (c. 1408 – 1470; r. 1448–1457, 1464–1465, 1467–1470), also known as Charles II
- Charles IX of Sweden (1550–1611; r. 1604–1611)
- Charles X Gustav of Sweden (1622–1660; r. 1654–1660)
- Charles XI of Sweden (1655–1697; r. 1660–1697)
- Charles XII of Sweden (1682–1718; r. 1697–1718)
- Charles XIII of Sweden (1748–1818; r. 1809–1818)
- Charles XIV John of Sweden (1763–1844; r. 1818–1844)
- Charles XV (1826–1872; r. 1859–1872)
- Carl XVI Gustaf of Sweden (born 1946; r. 1973–present)

== Other people ==
- Karl Sverkersson, a possible son of Sverker II, King of Sweden
- Karl Karlsson (1465–1468), son of Charles VIII, King of Sweden
- Prince Carl of Sweden (1544–1544), son of Gustav I, King of Sweden
- Charles Philip, Duke of Södermanland (1601–1622), son of Charles IX, King of Sweden
- Charles August, Crown Prince of Sweden (1768–1810), adopted by Charles XIII, king of Sweden
- Prince Carl Gustav, Duke of Småland (1782–1783), son of Gustav III, King of Sweden
- Prince Carl Oscar, Duke of Södermanland (1852–1854), son of Charles XV, King of Sweden
- Prince Carl, Duke of Västergötland (1861–1951), son of Oscar II, King of Sweden
- Carl Bernadotte (1911–2003), son of Prince Carl (1861-1951), Duke of Västergötland
- Carl Johan Bernadotte (1916–2012), son of Gustaf VI Adolf, King of Sweden
- Prince Carl Philip, Duke of Värmland (born 1979), son of Carl XVI Gustaf, King of Sweden

== See also ==
- King Carl (disambiguation)
- King Charles (disambiguation)
- Prince Charles (disambiguation)
- Prince Karl (disambiguation)
