= Clark Gayton (Royal Navy officer) =

Royal Navy Admiral (1712–1785)

Admiral Clark Gayton
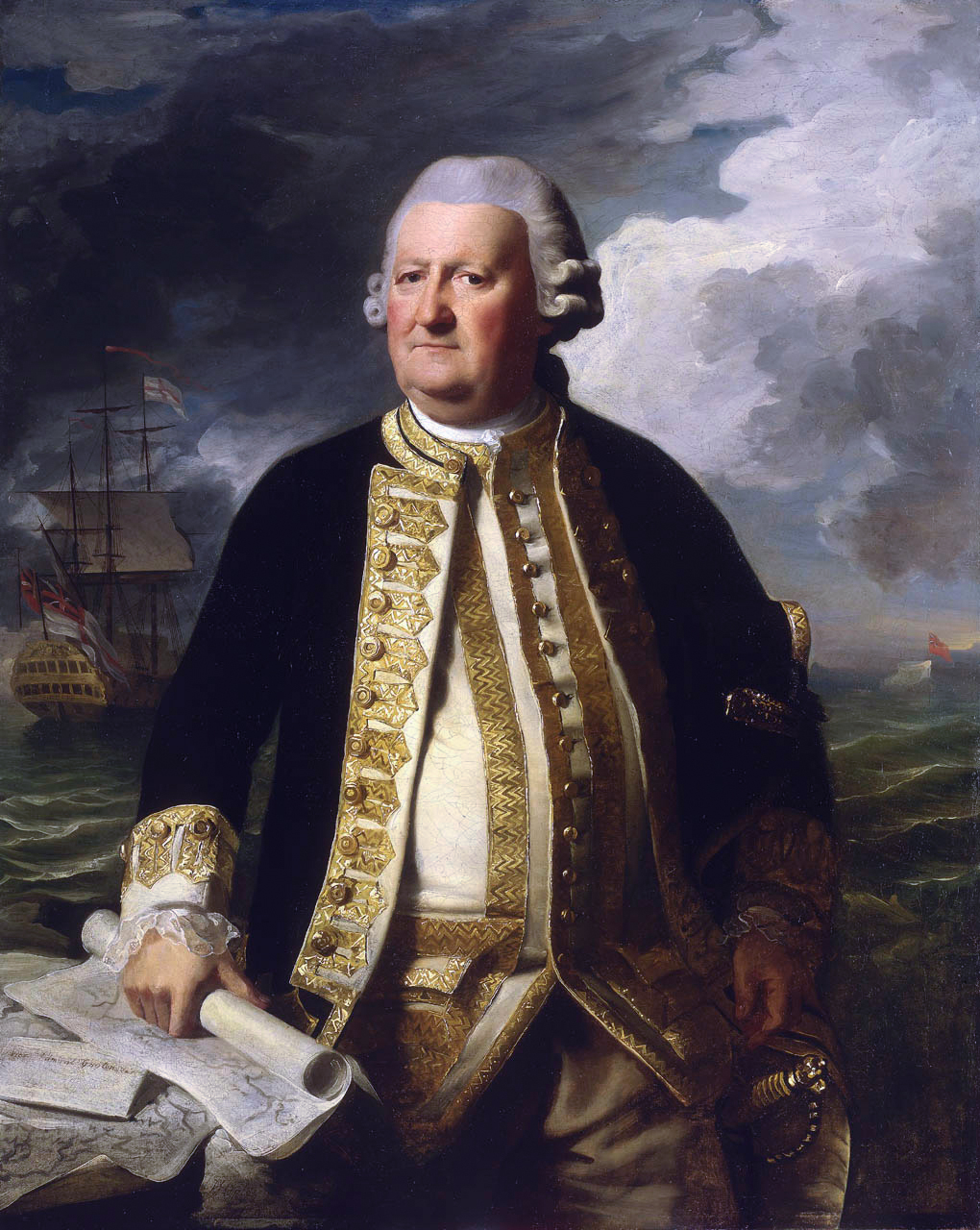
- Admiral Clark Gayton (John Singleton Copley, 1779)
- Born: 1712
- Died: 5 March 1785 (aged 72–73)
- Military career
- Allegiance: Kingdom of Great Britain
- Branch: Royal Navy
- Rank: Admiral
- Commands: Bien Aimé; Mermaid; Antelope; Royal Anne; Prince; St George; San Antonio; Jamaica Station
- Conflicts: American Revolutionary War

Admiral Clark Gayton (1712 – 5 March 1785) was an admiral in the British Royal Navy serving in the American Revolutionary War and in the West Indies before retiring to his home in Fareham, England. His brother George Gayton was also in the navy and achieved the rank of vice-admiral. He was born in Portsmouth, England, the third son of John Gayton who was postmaster of Portsmouth and Eleanor Clark. He was christened in St Thomas' Church, Portsmouth, Hampshire on 18 April 1712.

== Navy career ==
He served as Midshipman to Captain Peter Warren aboard the Squirrel off the coast of North America when he was in his twenties and thereafter in the West Indies under Commodore Knowles who promoted him to command the storeship Bien Aimé on 12 August 1744.

He was based in Boston in July 1745 again under Commodore Peter Warren when he was placed in command of the Mermaid and also in charge of a convoy returning to England in March 1746. He remained in command of the Mermaid based in Portsmouth until September 1747.

He was then without a ship and on half pay until he was given the command of and commissioned the Antelope in May 1756, transferring to the Royal Anne guardship based in Spithead in August of the same year. Six months later he served as Flag-Captain under Admiral Henry Osborn in command of the Prince. In 1758 he was appointed to the St George and it was in command of this vessel that he departed for the West Indies joining the squadron under the command of Commodore Moore. Engagements at this time included the failed attack on Martinique and the invasion of Guadeloupe in 1758/1759.

The St George returned to Europe at the end of 1759 and remained there attached to the Grand Fleet in the Bay of Biscay until the declaration of peace.

From 1769 Gayton commanded the guardship San Antonio at Portsmouth. He was promoted to rear-admiral in October 1770 and left England four years later with his flag on the Antelope to take command of the Jamaica Station where he met a young Horatio Nelson, then Lieutenant Nelson when he served as lieutenant aboard the Lowestoffe. Gayton had many difficulties with the French officials that were his counterparts in Cap Français as well as the French governor concerning movements of his forces in the conduct of their duties. He was promoted to the rank of vice-admiral in February 1776. During his time as commander of Jamaica station, more than 235 vessels were seized. He returned to England in April 1778, after which he had no further service. He gained the rank of admiral in April 1782. He was succeeded by Sir Peter Parker as commander of Jamaica station.

His health was very poor in his last years, and he died in Fareham on 5 March 1785 aged 74.

The National Maritime Museum has his portrait by John Singleton Copley painted in 1779.

== Marriage and family ==
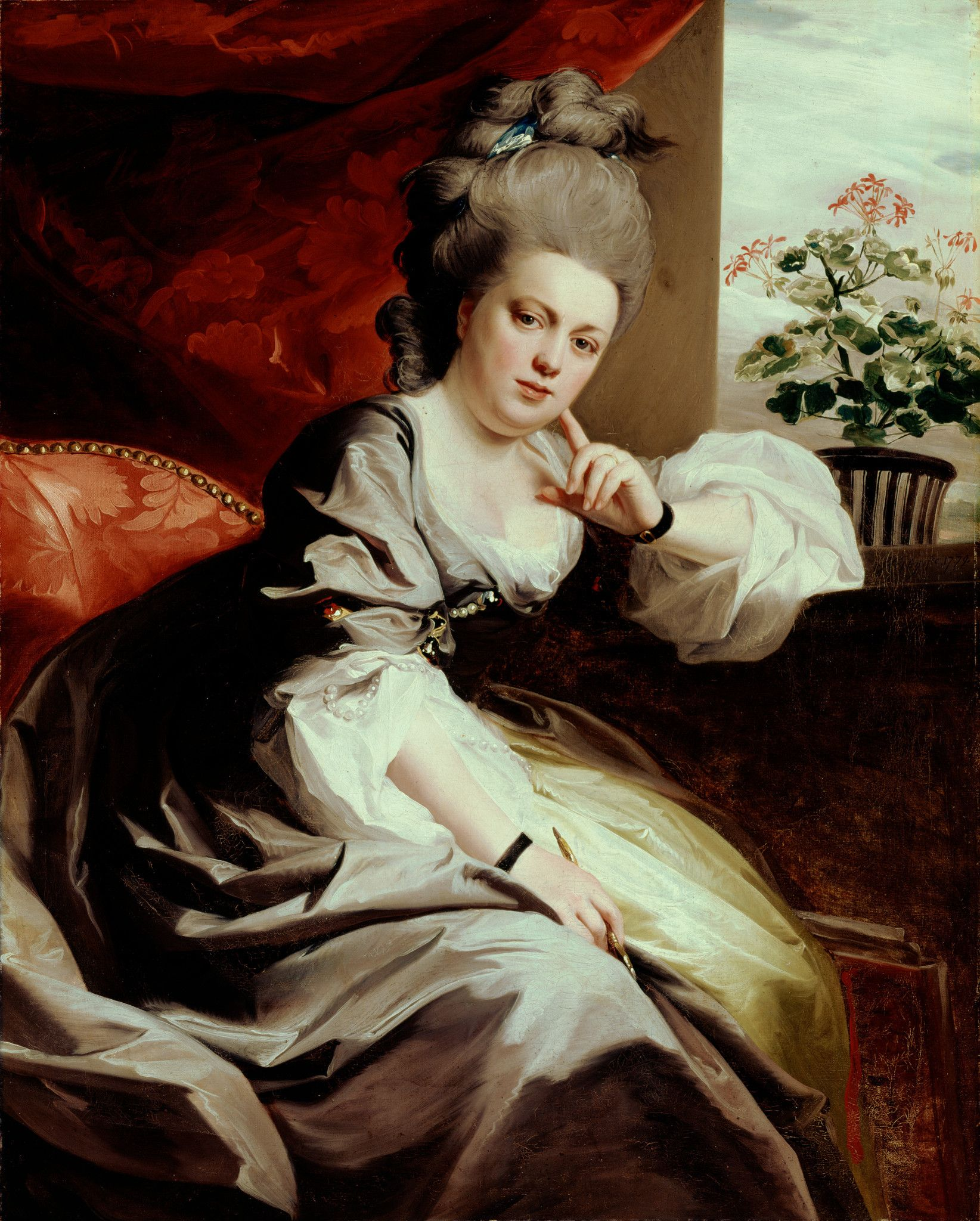
The second wife, Mrs. Clark Gayton, 1779, by John Singleton Copley

When stationed in Boston he married a colonist and citizen of Boston, Judith Rawlins (10 October 1714 – 1774, daughter of Captain John Rawlins (shipmaster) and Love Prout), by whom he had one son, George Clark Gayton (1751–1800), and after her death, Elizabeth Legge, relative of the Earl of Dartmouth. She remarried four months after his death to Captain Thomas Newnham.

Clark Gayton's father, John Gayton (1682–1737), was the postmaster of Portsmouth from 1707 until being succeeded by Moses Baxter in 1712. Thomas Gayton was the grandfather of Clark Gayton and was a gentleman, alderman, and British Army officer, who died in 1694.

== Sources ==
- Cundall, Frank (1915). Historic Jamaica. West India Committee.

Military offices
Preceded by George Rodney	Commander-in-Chief, Jamaica Station; 1774–1778	Succeeded by Peter Parker
