= HMS Charles =

HMS Charles has been the name of more than one ship of the English or British Royal Navy:

- English ship Charles (1586), a 16-gun pinnace launched in 1586 and sold in 1616
- English ship Charles (1620), a 16-gun pinnace built in 1620 and last listed in 1627
- English ship Charles (1632), a 44-gun ship launched in 1632, renamed HMS Liberty in 1649, and wrecked in 1650
- English ship Charles (1649), a 38-gun ship captured in 1649, renamed Guinea in 1649, and sold in 1667
- HMS Charles (1662), a royal yacht launched in 1662 and transferred to the Ordnance Office in 1668
- HMS Charles (1666), a 6-gun fireship purchased in 1666 and sold in 1667
- HMS Charles (1668), a 96-gun first rate launched in 1668, renamed St George in 1687, and scrapped in 1774
- HMS Charles (1675), an 8-gun royal yacht launched in 1675 and wrecked in 1678
- HMS Charles (1688), a 6-gun fireship purchased in 1688 and expended in 1695

== See also ==
- HMS Charles V (1665)
- HM Hired armed ship Charles
- HM hired armed schooner Charles (1811-1814)
