= Charles of England =

Charles of England may refer to the following monarchs of England and later the United Kingdom:

- Charles I of England (1600–1649), King of England from 1625
- Charles II of England (1630–1685), King of England from 1660
- Charles III (born 1948), King of the United Kingdom since 2022

== See also ==
- Charles Edward Stuart (1720–1788), Jacobite pretender to the British throne
- King Charles (disambiguation)
- Prince Charles (disambiguation)
