= Carl King (disambiguation) =

Carl King is a fictional character in Emmerdale.

Carl King may also refer to:

- American musician whose real name is Carl King, Sir Millard Mulch
- Carl King (singer)

== See also ==
- King Carl (disambiguation)
