= HMS St Christopher =

Two ships and one training establishment of the Royal Navy have borne the name HMS St Christopher or HMS Saint Christopher, initially after the historic name of Saint Kitts, itself named after Saint Christopher:

- HMS Saint Christopher (1806) was the French privateer Mohawk, launched in 1805, that the Royal Navy captured in 1806. She was broken up in 1811.
- HMS St Christopher (1807) was an 18-gun sloop, originally a French privateer named Mohawk. The people of Saint Kitts, St Christopher, presented her to the Navy in 1806 and named her in their island's honour. She was on the Navy List until 1810.
- HMS St Christopher (shore establishment) was the Royal Navy's Coastal Forces Training Base from October 1940 to December 1944 in Fort William and Corpach in the Scottish Highlands.
