= Sir Charles =

Sir Charles may refer to:

== People ==
- Sir Charles, nickname of U.S. basketball player Charles Barkley
- Sir Charles (wrestler), ring name of U.S. pro-wrestler Charles Wright
- Sir Charles Jones (born 1973) U.S. blues musician

== Other uses ==
- Sir Charles (horse) (foaled 1816) U.S. racehorse
- Sir Charles Tupper Secondary School, Vancouver, British Columbia, Canada; a.k.a. "Sir Charles"
- Sir Charles Kingsford-Smith Elementary School, Vancouver, British Columbia, Canada; a.k.a. "Sir Charles"

== See also ==
- King Charles (disambiguation)
- Prince Charles (disambiguation)
- Lord Charles (disambiguation)
- Charles (disambiguation)
- Sir (disambiguation)
