= Prince Carlos =

Prince Carlos or Carlo may refer to:

- Charles, Prince of Viana (1421–1461)
- Carlos, Prince of Asturias (1545–1568)
- Carlo Gesualdo (1566–1613)
- Charles Emmanuel III of Sardinia (1701–1773)
- Prince Charles Alexander of Lorraine (1712–1780)
- Infante Charles of Portugal (1716–1730)
- Charles III of Spain (1716–1788)
- Charles IV of Spain (1748–1819)
- Charles Felix of Sardinia (1765–1831)
- Charles Emmanuel, Prince of Carignan (1770–1800)
- Carlo, Duke of Calabria (1775–1778)
- Carlo Filangieri (1784–1867)
- Carlo Emmanuele dal Pozzo, Prince della Cisterna (1787–1864)
- Infante Carlos, Count of Molina (1788–1855)
- Charles Albert of Sardinia (1798–1849)
- Charles Lucien Bonaparte (1803–1857)
- Charles Ferdinand, Prince of Capua (1811–1862)
- Charles III, Duke of Parma (1823–1854)
- Carlos I of Portugal (1863–1908)
- Prince Carlos of Bourbon-Two Sicilies (1870–1949)
- Carlos Hugo, Duke of Parma (1930–2010)
- Infante Carlos, Duke of Calabria (1938–2015)
- Carlo Alessandro, 3rd Duke of Castel Duino (born 1952)
- Prince Carlo, Duke of Castro (born 1963)
- Carlos, Duke of Parma (born 1970)

== See also ==
- Prince Charles (disambiguation)
- Prince Karl (disambiguation)
