= Charles Island =

Charles Island may refer to:

- Charles Island (Connecticut), United States
- Charles Island, Bermuda
- Charles Island (Nunavut), Canada
- Floreana Island, Galapagos Islands, Ecuador, formerly known as Charles Island
- Española Island, Galapagos Islands, Ecuador, formerly known as Charles Island

== See also ==
- Charles (disambiguation)
- Prince Charles Island, Nunavut, Canada
- Sir Charles Hardy Islands, Queensland, Australia
