= HMS St Anne =

Two ships of the Royal Navy have borne the name HMS St Anne, after Saint Anne:

- HMS St Anne (1626) was a ship captured from the French in 1626 and sold in 1630.
- HMS St Anne (1761) was a 64-gun third rate captured from the French in 1761 and sold in 1784.

== See also ==
- French ship Sainte Anne, 1756 ship
