= Lord Charles (disambiguation) =

Lord Charles is a ventriloquism dummy built by Leonard Insull and used by ventriloquist Ray Alan.

Lord Charles may also refer to:

- Charles I, Lord of Monaco (died 1357), soldier and founder of the Grimaldi dynasty
- Charles II, Lord of Monaco (1555–1589)
- a nickname for the curveball

== See also ==
- Charles Lord II (1928–1993), U.S. banker
- Charles R. Lord (1931–1993), U.S. intelligence officer
- King Charles (disambiguation)
- Prince Charles (disambiguation)
- Sir Charles (disambiguation)
- Charles (disambiguation)
- Lord (disambiguation)
