= List of Admiralty floating docks =

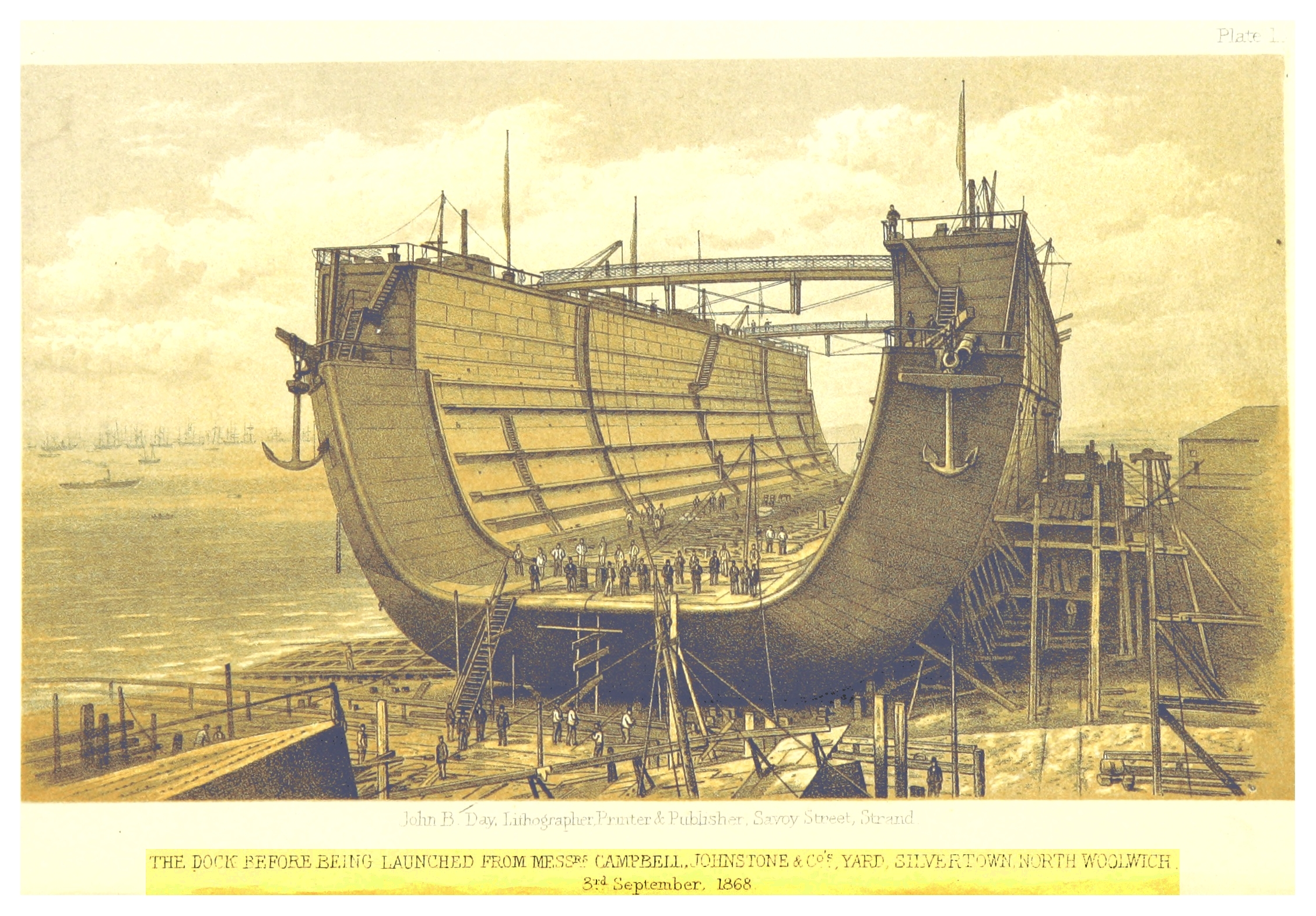
The floating dock Bermuda under construction in England, before it was towed to Bermuda in 1869

The Royal Navy had a number of floating drydocks for the repair of warships where there was no fixed dry dock available. The docks did not receive a name and were known as "Admiralty Floating Dock" with a number. In size they went up to ones capable of lifting the largest Royal Navy battleships.

== List ==
19th Century

- Admiralty Floating Dock Bermuda - Royal Naval Dockyard, Ireland Island, Bermuda, moored in the camber of what was to become the North Yard of the dockyard when the South Yard was constructed at the turn of the Century. 1869-1906. It was intended to be scrapped by a German company, but this was prevented by the outbreak of the First World War and it remains across the mouth of the Great Sound at Spanish Point, crumbling away in the shallows of Stovell Bay.

Numbered docks

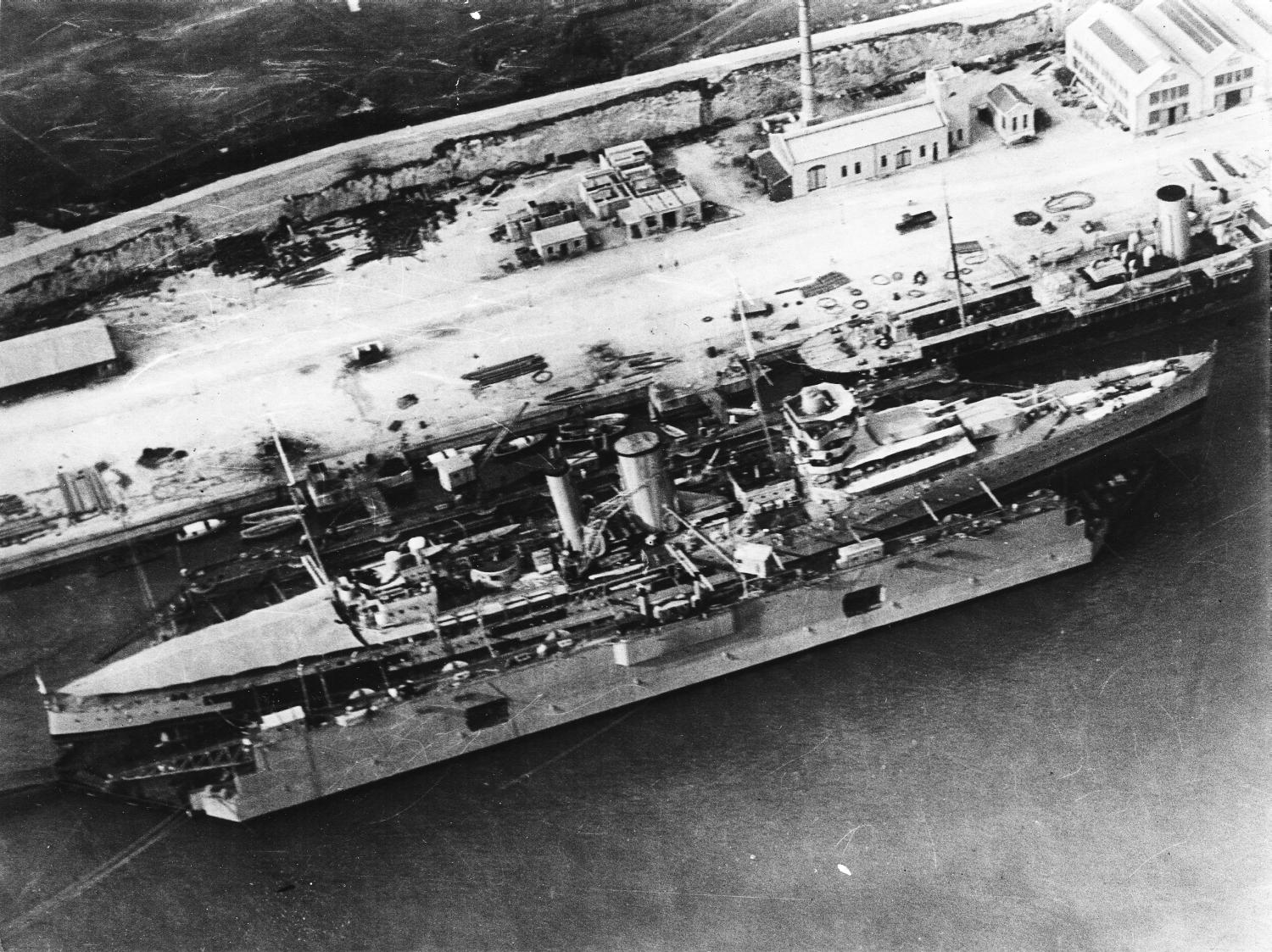
HMS York in Admiralty Floating Dock No. 1 at the Royal Naval Dockyard in Bermuda in 1934

- Admiralty Floating Dock No. 1 - Royal Naval Dockyard, Bermuda, 1902-1946. The largest floating drydock in the world when built, it was towed to Bermuda from Sheerness by two tugs in 1902. It was initially anchored off Agar's Island and Boss' Cove, close to Admiralty House at Spanish Point, Pembroke, pending completion of the new South Yard, its intended berth, at the Royal Naval Dockyard. Renamed from "Bermuda Dock" to AFD 1 in 1925. Clark & Standfield, 545 ft, 99 ft internal width with a lifting capacity of 11,700tons AFD 1 was virtually rebuilt at Bermuda in order to accommodate HMS York and HMS Exeter when they replaced C and D Class cruisers on the station in 1934.
- Admiralty Floating Dock No. 2 - Haslar Creek (HMS Dolphin) from 1906: 1000 tons net capacity, designed to lift submarines; built by Vickers, Sons & Maxim.
- Admiralty Floating Dock No. 3- Dover, 1912, designed to lift three submarines. 290 ft, 1600 tons
- Admiralty Floating Dock No. 4 - Medway, 680 ft, 32,000 tons lifting capacity
- Admiralty Floating Dock No. 5 - Portsmouth Royal Dockyard 1912-1914 and 1919-1939. The world's largest floating dock at the time, it was moved to Invergordon for the duration of the First World War (pending completion of Rosyth Dockyard), to enable dreadnoughts to be docked in Scotland. Moved to Alexandria in 1939; it was then at the Royal Naval Dockyard, Bermuda, 1946-1951.
- Admiralty Floating Dock No. 6 -Sheerness. built by Swan Hunter & Wigham Richardson 280 ft, 2000 tons. Intended for Harwich to lift two destroyers at a time, moved to Sheerness in 1920.
- Admiralty Floating Dock No. 7 - Portland Harbour from 1914.
- Admiralty Floating Dock No. 8 - Originally constructed in two sections by Howaldtswerke at Kiel in 1917 as German Imperial Navy No. VIII. Claimed by UK in reparations for WWI, designated AFD8, and assigned to Malta. To increase capacity an additional mid-section was fabricated at Chatham. AFD8 was towed to Valletta, where the hull was in separated into two original sections, and the mid-section inserted. Operational from October 1925. Bombed and sunk by Italian aircraft on 20 June 1940. Replaced by AFD No. 35 in 1947.
- Admiralty Floating Dock No. 9 - Singapore, also known as "Singapore Dock" or "Admiralty IX", 855 ft long, 55,000 tons capacity
- Admiralty Floating Dock No. 10
- Admiralty Floating Dock No. 11 - Southampton, 960 ft; lifting capacity 60,000 tons. Built for Southern Railway. The world's largest floating dock at the time, it was taken over by the Admiralty in 1939 and was used at Portsmouth Royal Dockyard until 1959, when it was sold to the Rotterdam Dock Company. Sank off the coast of Spain in 1984, en route to Brazil.
- Admiralty Floating Dock No. 12 - At Rosyth, 380 ft, 2750 tons
- Admiralty Floating Dock No. 13
- Admiralty Floating Dock No. 14 - At Scapa Flow during WWII. Built by Palmers Hebburn, 240 ton lift, 142.5 ft
- Admiralty Floating Dock No. 15 - At Stornoway and Greenock during WWII. Built by Palmers Hebburn, 240 ton lift, 142.5 ft
- Admiralty Floating Dock No. 16 - At Lerwick and Invergordon during WWII. Built by Palmers Hebburn, 240 ton lift, 142.5 ft
- Admiralty Floating Dock No. 17 - Reykjavík. 2750 tons built at Devonport. Moved to Sydney in 1944 arriving in May 1945
- Admiralty Floating Dock No. 18 - Clark Stanfield design, lifting capacity of 2750 tons
- Admiralty Floating Dock No. 19 - Latterly at Vickers Shipbuilders/VSEL. Scrapped as base of pier at Gills Bay, Caithness.
- Admiralty Floating Dock No. 20 - Port Bannatyne on the Isle of Bute. 2750 tons. Replacement for AFD7. Used for submarines including X-craft
- Admiralty Floating Dock No. 21
- Admiralty Floating Dock No. 22 - Clark Stanfield design built at Chatham, lifting capacity of 2,750 tons, intended for the emergency docking of escort vessels and destroyers. Was at Coastal Forces Training Base HMS St Christopher (shore establishment) at Fort William during World War 2, then towed to Trincomalee to replace A.F.D. 23
- Admiralty Floating Dock No. 23- Built in Bombay in July 1944, with a lifting capacity of 50,000 tons. It was towed to Trincomalee and moored off Sober Island. She sank on 8 August 1944 while HMS Valiant was in dock.
- Admiralty Floating Dock No. 26 - Fabricated in Calcutta, assembled in Bombay 1944, Braithwaite B/j Ltd.; conveyed to England via Trincomalee, Malta and Gibraltar. Employed at Chatham Royal Dockyard (1947-1951), then Harwich (1951-54), Falmouth (1954-55), Portland (1955-58), Portsmouth (1959-84) and Rosyth (1984-95). Moved to Hafnarfjördur, Iceland 1995 is still in operation, to be scrapped 2021 - 2022
- Admiralty Floating Dock No. 28 -Royal Naval Dockyard, Bermuda. 1941-1946.
- Admiralty Floating Dock No. 35 -Malta. 1948 onwards.
- Admiralty Floating Dock No. 48 -Royal Naval Dockyard, Bermuda. The smaller of two at Royal Naval Dockyard, Bermuda from 1946 (replacing a US lend-lease dock) until the dockyard was reduced to a base in 1951. Transferred to civil Government after 1951 and remained until 1972.
- Admiralty Floating Dock No. 59 - launched Portsmouth, 1960, and moved to Barrow. 400 ft (120 m) long, for "destroyers, frigates and nuclear submarines"
- Admiralty Floating Dock No. 60 - Faslane (now HMNB Clyde), 1965 onwards. Constructed in Portsmouth, operated at Faslane with a 6,000 ton capacity for nuclear submarines. Moved to Hafnarfjördur Iceland 1997 is still in operation
- Admiralty Floating Dock No. 67 - 1945. Constructed from concrete. 800 ton capacity for service with RN Far East.
