= HMS San Antonio =

Three ships of the Royal Navy have borne the name HMS San Antonio, a foreign-language version of Saint Anthony:

- HMS San Antonio (1700) was a 4-gun sloop, formerly a pirate ship belonging to William Kidd. She was captured in 1700 and sunk as a foundation in 1707.
- HMS San Antonio (1762) was a 64-gun third rate captured from the Spanish in 1762 and sold in 1775.
- HMS San Antonio (1807) was a 74-gun third rate, previously the Spanish ship San Antonio and the French ship Saint Antoine. She was captured in 1801, commissioned as a prison ship from 1807, as a powder hulk in 1814, and was sold in 1828.
