= HMS Antelope (1703) =

Ship of the line of the Royal Navy

History

Great Britain
- Name: HMS Antelope
- Builder: Taylor, Rotherhithe
- Launched: 13 March 1703
- Fate: Sold out of the service, 30 October 1783

General characteristics as built
- Class & type: 50-gun fourth rate ship of the line
- Tons burthen: 68480/94 (bm)
- Length: 131 ft 5 in (40.1 m) (gun deck); 108 ft 11.5 in (33.2 m) (keel)
- Beam: 34 ft 4.5 in (10.5 m)
- Depth of hold: 13 ft 9 in (4.2 m)
- Propulsion: Sails
- Sail plan: Full-rigged ship
- Complement: 280
- Armament: 54 guns comprising: Upper deck: 22 × 12-pounder guns; Lower deck: 22 x 12-pounder guns; Quarterdeck: 8 × 6-pounder guns; Forecastle: 2 x 6-pounder guns

General characteristics after 1741 rebuild
- Class & type: 1733 proposals 50-gun fourth rate ship of the line
- Tons burthen: 86044/94 (bm)
- Length: 134 ft (40.8 m) (gundeck)
- Beam: 38 ft 6 in (11.7 m)
- Depth of hold: 15 ft 9 in (4.8 m)
- Propulsion: Sails
- Sail plan: Full-rigged ship
- Armament: 50 guns: Gundeck: 22 × 18-pounders; Upper gundeck: 22 × 9-pounders; Quarterdeck: 4 × 6-pounders; Forecastle: 2 × 6-pounders

HMS Antelope was a 50-gun fourth rate ship of the line of the Royal Navy, launched at Rotherhithe on 13 March 1703. She was rebuilt once during her career, and served in the Seven Years' War and the American Revolutionary War.

Orders were issued on 9 January 1738 for Antelope to be taken to pieces and rebuilt according to the 1733 proposals of the 1719 Establishment at Woolwich, from where she was relaunched on 27 January 1741.

== Career ==
On 16 June 1756, she sailed from England for Gibraltar with Vice Admiral Sir Edward Hawke, 1st Baron Hawke and Rear Admiral Charles Saunders. She arrived there on 3 July with an order to supersede Admiral John Byng. Antelope returned to England with Byng, sailing on 9 July and arriving at Spithead on 26 July, where Byng was arrested before being landed on 19 August. His trial started on board St George on 27 December.

On 30 April 1757, Captain Samuel Hood took command of Antelope. On 15 May, after a short action off Brest, France, the French Aquilon, 50, was driven on to the rocks in Audierne Bay where she was wrecked. Then, on 31 October 1758, in the Kingroad off Portishead, Antelope took Belliqueux, 64, one of a French squadron returning from Quebec, that had anchored off Ilfracombe, Antelope opened fire but the French ship surrendered without having fired a shot in return.

Not every action was a success. In 1759, under the command of Captain James Webb, Antelope was attached to Commodore William Boys' squadron, which had been blockading François Thurot in Dunkirk throughout the summer and early autumn. On 15 October, when the squadron had been driven off station during a gale, Thurot made his escape with six frigates and corvettes carrying 1300 troops and sailed to Gothenburg.

In 1762, Antelope was stationed in Placentia Bay, Newfoundland, under the command of Commodore Thomas Graves, who was the Colony's Naval Governor. A French fleet from Brest, under M. de Ternay, with 1500 troops commanded by the Comte d'Haussonville, sailed into St. John's and captured the town on 24 June. Captain Graves immediately sent word to Commodore Lord Colville at Halifax who joined him in blockading the French, and brought troops over from Louisbourg on Cape Breton Island on 11 September. During a gale on 16 September de Ternay evaded the blockade and, abandoning the troops, sailed back to France.

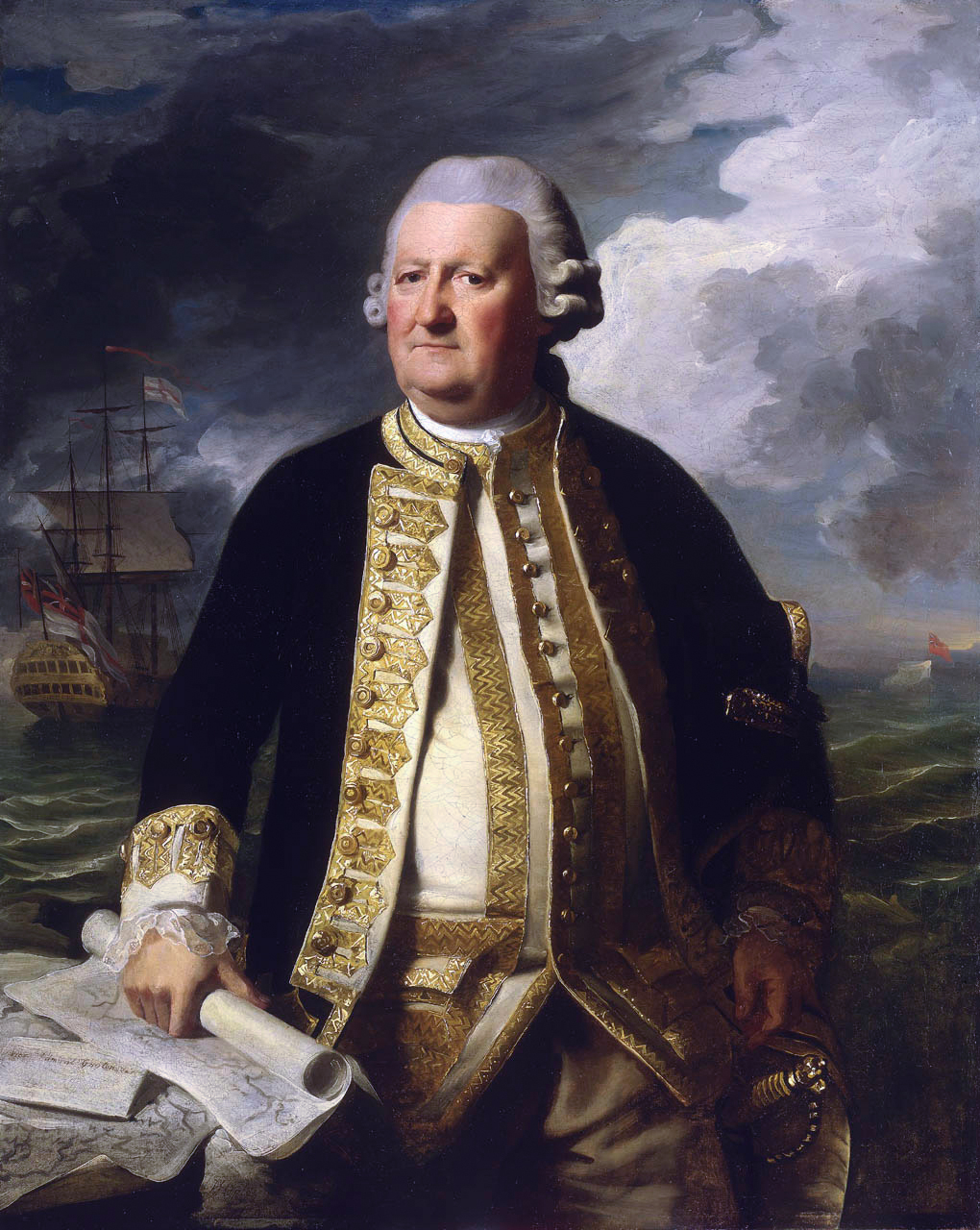
Admiral Clark Gayton and behind him on the left, the Antelope, by John Singleton Copley

On her way home to England Antelope under Admiral Clark Gayton she encountered HMS Marlborough, under Captain Thomas Burnett, which had sailed from Havana as part of the escort of a convoy of prizes and transports, but had become separated in very heavy weather. She was leaking so badly that her guns had to be thrown overboard and the pumps kept working. Antelope took all her people off on 29 November when she started to founder and she was allowed to sink.

American Revolution: Under command of Will Judd she captured Schooners "Betsy", and "Peggy" and sloop "Stordy", probably between 20 and 25 December 1776. She captured schooner "Juno", probably between December, 1776 and March, 1777. She captured brig "Papilllon" and brig "Sunberry", probably between mid September and mid October, 1777. She captured brig "Elizabeth", probably in mid December, 1777. On 6 April 1778, under command of Capt. Charles Holmes Everitt, she and HMS Diligence captured American schooner "John". Later, in 1780, Antelope was again patrolling the Labrador coast and intercepted the American ship Mercury. As the vessels came to close quarters, a package was thrown overboard from the latter. One of the sailors on Antelope dived from the deck and rescued the package, which contained details of secret negotiations then being conducted between the United States and the United Provinces. Antelope Harbour, Labrador, is named for this incident.

Antelope was sold out of the service on 30 October 1783.
