= HMS Belliqueux (1758) =

Ship of the line of the Royal Navy

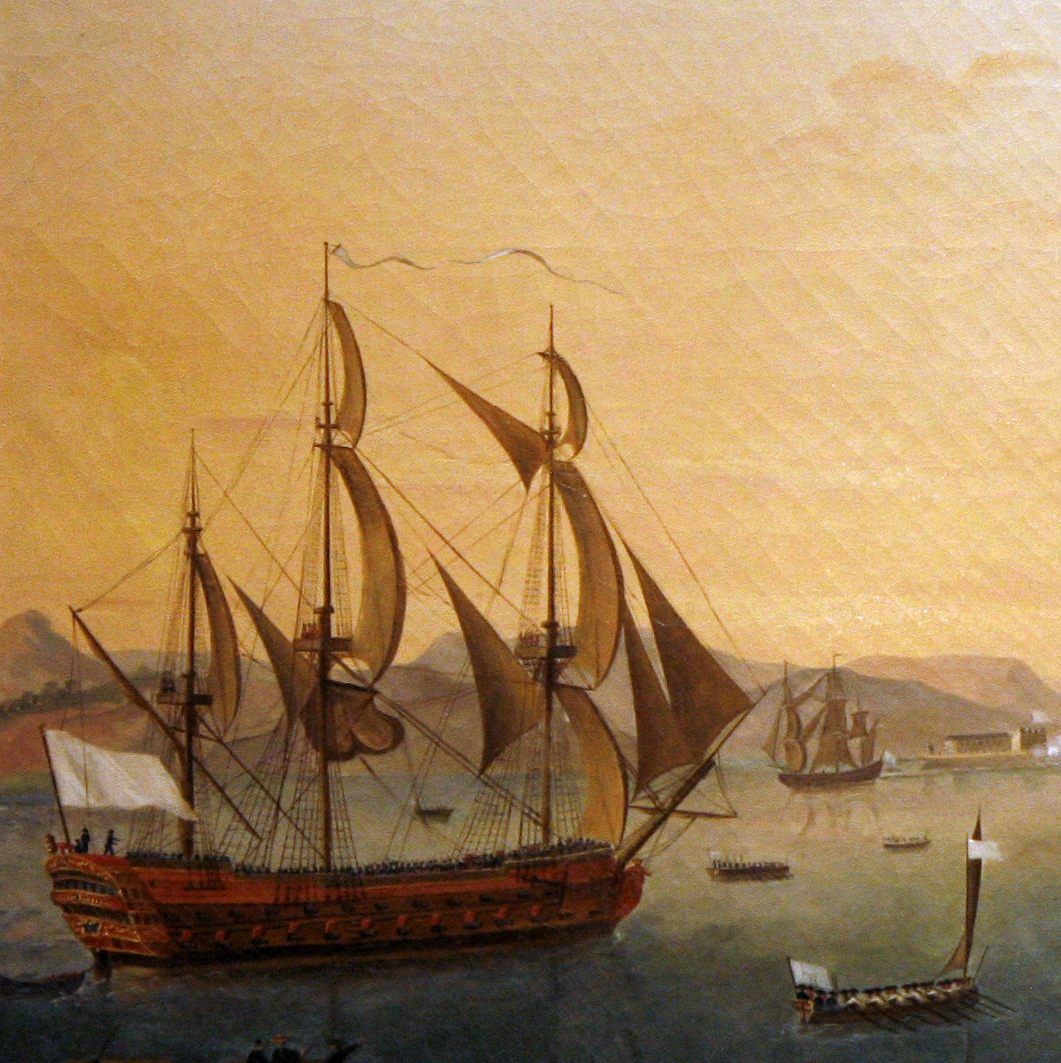

History

France
- Name: Belliqueux
- Namesake: Belliqueux is french for Belligerent or Warlike
- Launched: August 1756
- Captured: 2 November 1758, by Royal Navy

Great Britain
- Name: HMS Belliqueux
- Acquired: 2 November 1758
- Fate: Broken up, September 1772

General characteristics
- Class & type: 64-gun third rate ship of the line
- Tons burthen: 137180/94 (bm)
- Length: 157 ft 10 1/2 in (48.1 m) (gundeck)
- Beam: 44 ft 10 1/2 in (13.7 m)
- Depth of hold: 19 ft 10 in (6.05 m)
- Propulsion: Sails
- Sail plan: Full-rigged ship
- Armament: 64 guns of various weights of shot

Belliqueux was a 64-gun ship of the line of the French Navy, launched in 1756.

She was captured on 2 November 1758 by HMS Antelope in the Irish Sea. She was found by Antelope anchored off Ilfracombe, Antelope opened fire but the French ship surrendered without having fired a shot in return. The crew of 500 was captured.She was taken into the Royal Navy and commissioned as the third rate HMS Belliqueux.

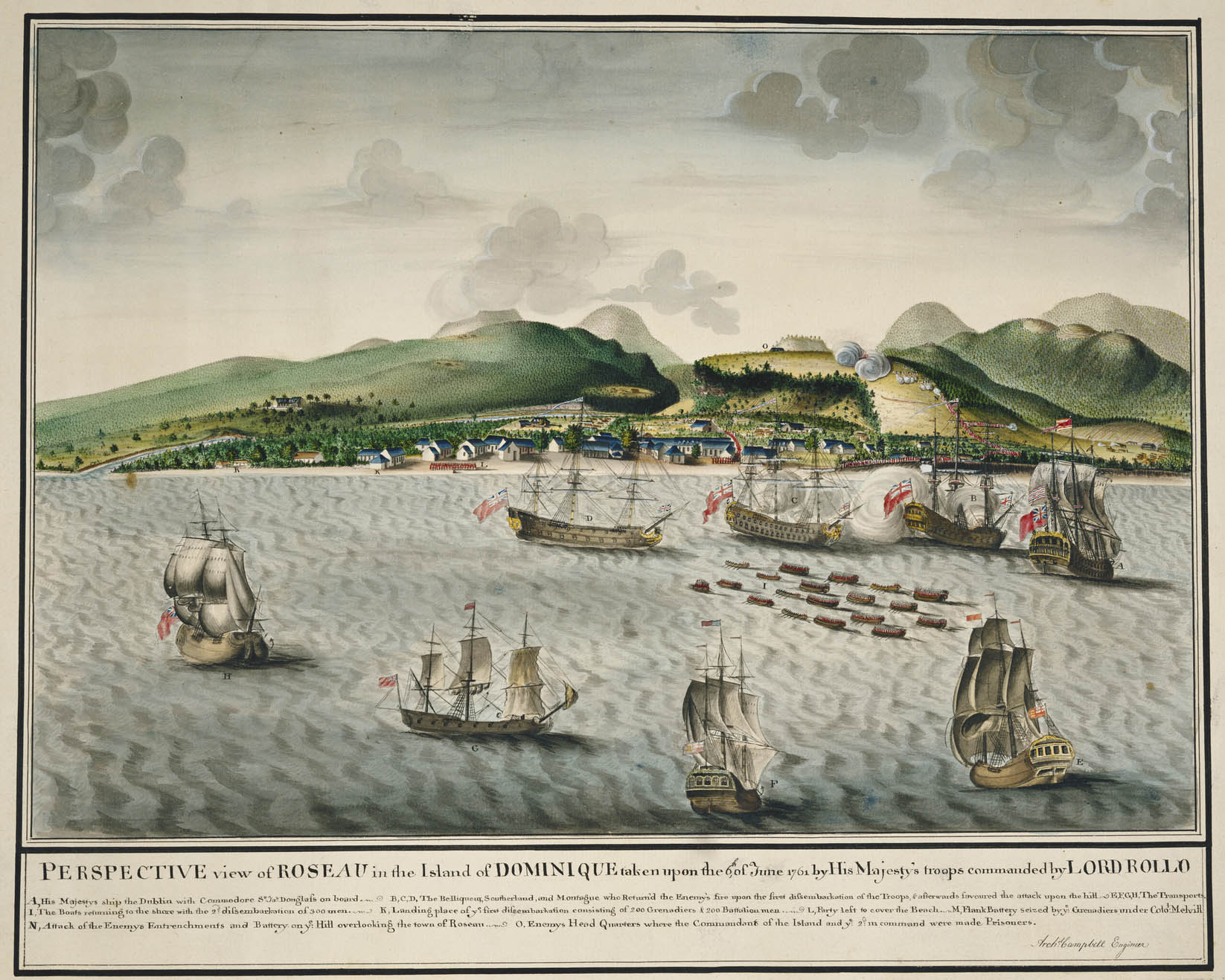
Belliqueux at Roseau, Dominica on 6 June 1761

The captains were:

- from November 1758: captain Thomas Saumarez, in the West Indies (quit due to ill health)
- from late 1761: captain Richard Edwards, in the Mediterranean.

Belliqueux was broken up in September 1772.

== See also ==
- List of ships captured in the 18th century
