= Prince Karl =

Prince Karl or Karel or Carl may refer to:

== People ==
- Karl I, Prince of Anhalt-Zerbst (1534–1561)
- Charles IX of Sweden (1550–1611)
- Karl I, Prince of Liechtenstein (1569–1627)
- Karl Eusebius, Prince of Liechtenstein (1611–1684)
- Charles I Louis, Elector Palatine (1617–1680)
- Karl, Prince of Anhalt-Zerbst (1652–1718)
- Karl Frederick, Prince of Anhalt-Bernburg (1668–1721)
- Charles XII of Sweden (1682–1718)
- Karl August, Prince of Waldeck and Pyrmont (1704–1763)
- Charles Louis, Prince of Anhalt-Bernburg-Schaumburg-Hoym (1723–1806)
- Karl Friedrich Wilhelm, Prince of Leiningen (1724–1807)
- Prince Karl Anton August of Schleswig-Holstein-Sonderburg-Beck (1727–1759)
- Prince Karl Borromäus of Liechtenstein (1730–1789)
- Karl George Lebrecht, Prince of Anhalt-Köthen (1730–1789)
- Charles of Saxony, Duke of Courland (1733–1796)
- Karl Anselm, 4th Prince of Thurn and Taxis (1733–1805)
- Charles Christian, Prince of Nassau-Weilburg (1735–1788)
- Charles-Joseph, 7th Prince of Ligne (1735–1814)
- Charles XIII of Sweden (1748–1818)
- Karl August von Hardenberg (1750–1822)
- Charles Eugene, Prince of Lambesc (1751–1825)
- Charles Louis, Hereditary Prince of Baden (1755–1801)
- Karl Alois, Prince Lichnowsky (1761–1814)
- Charles XIV John of Sweden (1763–1844)
- Karl Philipp von Wrede (1767–1838)
- Karl Alexander, 5th Prince of Thurn and Taxis (1770–1827)
- Karl Philipp, Prince of Schwarzenberg (1771–1820)
- Karl, Prince of Hohenzollern-Sigmaringen (1785–1853)
- Charles, Grand Duke of Baden (1786–1818)
- Prince Karl Theodor of Bavaria (1795–1875)
- Prince Charles of Prussia (1801–1883)
- Prince Karl Johann of Liechtenstein (1803–1871)
- Karl, Prince of Leiningen (1804–1856) (1804–1856)
- Prince Charles of Hesse and by Rhine (1809–1877)
- Karl Anton, Prince of Hohenzollern (1811–1885)
- Prince Carl of Solms-Braunfels (1812–1875)
- Prince Karl of Auersperg (1814–1890)
- Charles XV of Sweden (1826–1872)
- Carl Ludwig II, Prince of Hohenlohe-Langenburg (1829–1907)
- Charles Gonthier, Prince of Schwarzburg-Sondershausen (1830–1909)
- Archduke Karl Salvator of Austria (1839–1892)
- Carol I of Romania (1839–1914)
- Prince Carl Oscar, Duke of Södermanland (1852–1854)
- Karl, 8th Prince Kinsky of Wchinitz and Tettau (1858–1919)
- Karl Max, Prince Lichnowsky (1860–1928)
- Prince Carl, Duke of Västergötland (1861–1951)
- Prince Karl Anton of Hohenzollern (1868–1919)
- Haakon VII of Norway (1872–1957) (born Prince Carl of Denmark)
- Prince Karl of Bavaria (1874–1927)
- Charles Edward, Duke of Saxe-Coburg and Gotha (1884–1954)
- Charles I of Austria (1887–1922)
- Karl, Prince of Leiningen (1898–1946) (1898–1946)
- Karl August, 10th Prince of Thurn and Taxis (1898–1982)
- Karl Gero, Duke of Urach (1899–1981)
- Prince Charles, Count of Flanders (1903–1983)
- Archduke Karl Pius of Austria, Prince of Tuscany (1909–1953)
- Prince Carl Bernadotte (1911–2003)
- Carol Victor, Hereditary Prince of Albania (1913–1973)
- Prince Karl Franz of Prussia (1916–1975)
- Count Carl Johan Bernadotte of Wisborg (1916–2012)
- Prince Karl of Leiningen (1928–1990)
- Prince Karl of Hesse (1937–2022)
- Karel Schwarzenberg (1937–2023)
- Carl XVI Gustaf of Sweden (born 1946)
- Prince Karl Emich of Leiningen (born 1952)
- Karl Friedrich, Prince of Hohenzollern (born 1952)
- Archduke Karl of Austria (born 1961)
- Karl, 12th Prince Kinsky of Wchinitz and Tettau (born 1967)
- Prince Carl Philip, Duke of Värmland (born 1979)

== Other ==
- Prince Karl (play), an 1886 play by A. C. Gunter

== See also ==
- Carl of Sweden (disambiguation)
- King Carl (disambiguation)
- Prince Carlos (disambiguation)
- Prince Charles (disambiguation)
