= Charles, Prince of Wales (disambiguation) =

Charles, Prince of Wales is the former title of Charles III (born 1948), before his accession to the throne of the United Kingdom and the other Commonwealth realms.

Charles, Prince of Wales is also the former title of:

- Charles I of England (1600–1649)
- Charles II of England (1630–1685)
- Charles Edward Stuart (1720–1788), pretender to the title

== See also ==
- Prince Charles (disambiguation)
