= French ship Sainte Anne =

French Navy gun ship

History

France
- Name: Sainte Anne
- Laid down: 1754
- Launched: 1756 at Genoa
- Completed: 1759
- Acquired: February 1760 at Lisbon
- Captured: 25 May 1761, by Royal Navy

Great Britain
- Name: St Anne
- Acquired: 23 December 1761
- Commissioned: February 1762
- Decommissioned: 21 October 1784
- In service: 1762–1763; 1775–1784
- Out of service: 1763–1775
- Fate: Sold, 1784

General characteristics
- Class & type: 64-gun third rate ship of the line
- Tons burthen: 1407 50/94 bm
- Length: 165 ft 0 in (50.29 m) (gundeck); 136 ft 2 in (41.50 m) (keel)
- Beam: 44 ft 1 in (13.44 m)
- Depth of hold: 19 ft 7.5 in (6.0 m)
- Sail plan: Full-rigged ship
- Armament: 64 guns, comprising: Lower deck: 26 × 24-pounder guns; Upper deck: 28 × 18-pounder guns; Quarterdeck: 8 × 9-pounder guns; Forecastle: 2 × 9-pounder guns

Sainte Anne was a 64-gun ship of the line of the French Navy, launched in 1756. She was captured by the Royal Navy on 25 May 1761, and commissioned as the third rate HMS St Anne.

St Anne was sold out of the Navy in 1784.
