= HMS St Lucia =

Two vessels of the Royal Navy has borne the name HMS St Lucia or HMS Saint Lucia, while another was planned:

- HMS St Lucia (1780) was a small brig that Admiral Rodney bought in 1780 and which he appointed Lieutenant John Hutt to command; Hutt transferred to HMS Sandwich in October and it is not clear what became of St Lucia.
- HMS Saint Lucia (1803) was a 14-gun gun-brig, previously the French Navy schooner Enfant Prodigue. HMS Emerald captured her in 1803, but French privateers recaptured her in 1807.
- HMS St Lucia was to have been a Battle-class destroyer. She was laid down in 1945 but was canceled later that year.
