= HMS St Mary =

Three ships of the Royal Navy have borne the name HMS St Mary or HMS St Marys:

- HMS St Mary (1299) was a cog in service with the Cinque Ports in 1299.
- HMS St Mary (1626) was a ship purchased in 1626 and given away in 1628.
- HMS St Marys was a Town-class destroyer, previously the United States Navy USS Doran, which had been launched as USS Bagley. She was transferred to the Royal Navy in 1940 and was sold for scrapping in 1945.

== See also ==
- HMS Santa Maria
