= HMS St John =

Two ships of the Royal Navy have borne the name HMS St John:

- HMS St John (1764) was a schooner purchased in 1764 and condemned in 1777.
- HMS St John (1780) was a cutter purchased in 1780 and listed until 1781.

== See also ==
- HMS St John Prize (1695) was an advice boat captured from the French in 1695 but recaptured in 1696.
- HMCS Saint John (K456) was a River-class frigate of the Royal Canadian Navy.
- HMCS St. John's (FFH 340) is a Halifax-class frigate of the Royal Canadian Navy.
