= Charles River (disambiguation) =

Charles River is a short river to Boston Harbor, in Massachusetts, United States.

Charles River may also refer to:

== Rivers ==
- Charles River (Maine) in Maine, United States
- Charles River (Virginia) in Virginia, United States
- Charles River was the name given to the Delaware River by explorers Robert Evelin and Thomas Young in 1634.

== Other ==
- Charles River Associates, a global consulting firm
- Charles River Laboratories, a major US biomedical company
- Charles River Ventures, a venture capital firm
