= HMCS St. Laurent =

Two Canadian naval units have been named HMCS St. Laurent, with a third planned.

- HMCS St. Laurent (H83) initially served the Royal Navy as the Interwar Standard C-class destroyer HMS Cygnet (H83) before transfer to the Royal Canadian Navy for service as a River-class destroyer in the Second World War
- HMCS St. Laurent (DDH 205) was the lead ship of the Cold War St. Laurent-class destroyers
- HMCS Saint-Laurent is a planned River-class destroyers, intended to enter service in the 2030s.

== Battle honours ==
Ships of the Royal Canadian Navy bearing the name St. Laurent or Saint-Laurent share the following battle honours;

- Atlantic 1939–45
- Normandy 1944

== See also ==
- HMS St Lawrence
