= HMS St Christopher (shore establishment) =

WWII Naval Training Base in Scotland

Coordinates: 56°48′56″N 5°06′44″W

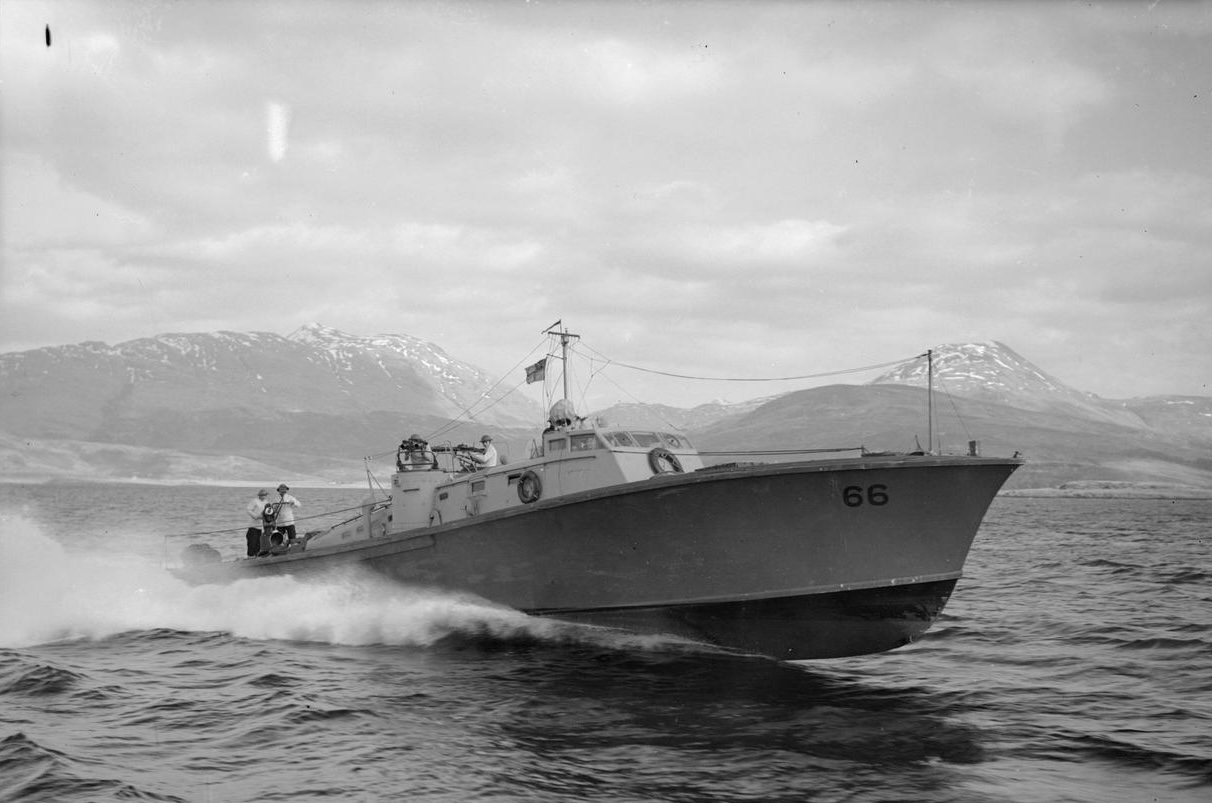
- MGB 66 at speed with the crew at action stations, off the coast at Fort William in 1942

History

United Kingdom
- Name: HMS St Christopher
- Commissioned: October 1940
- Decommissioned: December 1944

General characteristics
- Class & type: Stone frigate

HMS St Christopher was a Coastal Forces training base of the Royal Navy operational during the Second World War and located in and around Fort William, Scotland.

== History ==
Commissioned in October 1940, HMS St Christopher was in service for a total of four years, until being decommissioned in December 1944. The base was first commanded by Commander A.E.P. Welman DSO DSC RN, and existed to train the crews of a variety of different inshore patrol craft. To enable this, an Admiralty Floating Dock was moored at Corpach in Loch Linnhe for some of the time. Most of the courses lasted a number of weeks and involved such activities as firing torpedoes from Motor Torpedo Boats. A Westland Lysander or a Blackburn Skua would occasionally fly over the base to allow practices on anti-aircraft guns. Over its time in service, the base is estimated to have trained around 55,000 personnel from a number of different allied countries.

The base had a staff of several hundred, billeted in hotels around the town, with extra space being provided by Nissen huts. Most of the engineering and mechanical works were based at Corpach, and consisted of a number of sheds and slipways. The base was defended by a number of anti-aircraft guns and searchlights, which were also used to defend the town of Fort William herself.

By April 1942 there were around 80 to 90 boats at the training base, comprising a number of different flotillas. They consisted of nine Motor Torpedo Boats, thirty seven Motor Gun Boats, fourteen high speed motor anti-submarine boats, and a number of motor launches, many of them of the B Class Thorneycroft -Fairmile design. Several harbour defence motor launches were also attached to defend the base. A number of different boats were attached at different times to serve as depot ships, training vessels and accommodation ships. The Admiralty Floating Drydock AFD 22 was used as the base's main repair facility. After the base closed in 1944 she was towed to Trincomalee in Ceylon (now Sri Lanka), where she replaced AFD 23 which had been damaged beyond repair in an accident.

== Legacy ==
A number of the outbuildings and storage sheds can still be seen today, as can some of the old searchlight and gun emplacements. There are a number of commemorative and memorial plaques in the town, often located at the hotels where the recruits were billeted. The base is also commemorated in the name of the Lochaber Sea Cadet unit's current training ship, the TS St Christopher.

== See also ==
- List of Royal Navy shore establishments
