= HMS St Fiorenzo =

One ship of the Royal Navy has borne the name HMS St Fiorenzo, whilst another was planned:

- HMS St Fiorenzo (1794) was a 38-gun fifth rate, formerly the French ship Minerve. She was captured in 1794, having been scuttled. She was raised, placed on harbour service from 1812 and broken up in 1837.
- HMS St Fiorenzo was to have been a wood screw frigate. She was laid down in 1850 but cancelled in 1856.
