= HMS St Lawrence =

Six ships of the Royal Navy have borne the name HMS St Lawrence:

- HMS St Lawrence (1746) was a schooner purchased in 1764 and burnt after being struck by lightning in 1766.
- HMS St Lawrence (1767) was a 10-gun schooner purchased in 1767, decommissioned in 1775, and sold in 1776.
- HMS St Lawrence (1775) was a schooner purchased in 1775 and sold in 1783.
- HMS St Lawrence (1813) was a 12-gun schooner, formerly the American privateer Atlas. She was captured in 1813, but recaptured by the American privateer Chasseur in 1815.
- HMS St Lawrence (1814) was a 112-gun first rate launched in 1814 and sold in 1832.
- HMS St Lawrence was a 38-gun fifth rate launched in 1806 as HMS Shannon (1806). She was converted into a receiving ship and renamed HMS St Lawrence in 1844, and was broken up in 1859.

== See also ==
- Ships of the Royal Canadian Navy named HMCS St. Laurent
