= HMS St George (1701) =

History

England
- Name: HMS St George
- Acquired: 1701
- Fate: Deliberately sunk 1716

General characteristics
- Class & type: Hulk
- Tons burthen: 654 (bm)
- Length: Overall:132 ft 0 in (40.2 m); Keel:106 ft 4 in (32.4 m)
- Beam: 34 ft 0 in (10.4 m)
- Depth of hold: 16 ft 8 in (5.1 m)
- Notes: This vessel was not William Dampier's St George. That St George was a privateer, that Dampier abandoned on the coast of Peru in 1704.

HMS St George was a hulk at Harwich bought in 1701 from M. Stevens; she was sunk on 20 February 1716 as a foundation for Chatham Dockyard.
