= Billion Dollar Gift and Mutual Aid =

Canadian contributions to the Allies in WWII

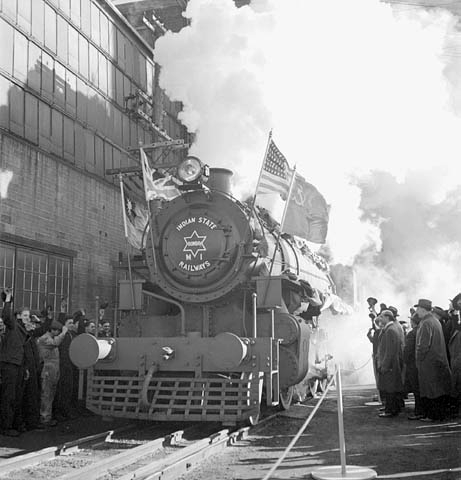
The first of 145 X-Dominion 2-8-2 locomotives built at a Montreal plant, for shipment to India.

The Billion Dollar Gift (French: Don d'un milliard de dollars) and Mutual Aid (Entraide mutuelle) were financial incentives instituted by the Canadian minister C. D. Howe during World War II.

== Background ==
Due to its expenditure on war materiel, Britain lacked gold reserves and U.S. dollars to pay for existing and future orders with Canadian industry. At the same time, following expansion, Canadian industry was dependent on British contracts and before the war had had a positive balance of trade with the UK, but with the establishment of Lend-Lease, the UK secured future orders with the US. The Billion Dollar Gift was given to the UK in January 1942, coupled with a C$700 million non-interest bearing loan, both anticipated to last just over a year. It did not last until the end of 1942. It was replaced in May 1943 with the "War Appropriation (United Nations Mutual Aid) Act, 1943", which provided aid to the UK and the other Allies and lasted until the end of the war. The magnitude of these contributions made them one of Canada's greatest contributions to the war. The two grants totaled over C$3 billion.

Moreover, the Billion Dollar Gift triggered a strong negative reaction amongst Canadians, particularly in Quebec. The rate at which the money was used was a key reason for the backlash, as was the lack of funding that was provided to the other nations in the Commonwealth. The aftermath of the Gift led Canada's future funding to assist the Allies with an alternative approach – one that focused on loaning material goods instead of money. A further consequence led to a change in the British Commonwealth Air Training Plan and this enabled another Canadian loan of just over $1 billion for Britain, Canada, Australia and New Zealand to share.

In addition, Canada provided materiel and services, including food, ammunition, and raw materials, as well as corvettes, Park ships, and radar sets, most of which went to the Commonwealth; some, like radars, also went to the U.S. In 1943, Canada had the fourth-highest industrial production among the Allies, led by the United States, the Soviet Union and the United Kingdom.

Canada also loaned $1.2 billion on a long-term basis to Britain immediately after the war; these loans were fully repaid in late 2006.

== See also ==
- British Commonwealth Air Training Plan
- Lend-Lease
- Valentine tank
- Military history of Canada during World War II
