= HMS St James =

Two ships of the Royal Navy have borne the name HMS St James:

- HMS St James (1625) was a ship captured in 1625 and listed until 1628.
- HMS St. James (D65) was a Battle-class destroyer launched in 1945 and scrapped in 1961.
