= Princess Charles =

Princess Charles may refer to:

- Diana, Princess of Wales (1961–1997), first wife of King Charles III
- Queen Camilla (born 1947), second and current wife of King Charles III

== See also ==
- Princess of Wales
