= Carl King (singer) =

British singer and songwriter

Carl King (born Carl Preston King, 1 October 1949, Beckenham, Kent, England), also known as Karl King, is a British singer and songwriter, who released two singles on CBS in 1966 and 1967. He started singing at the age of seven and became a member of the Southwark Cathedral choir at eleven

== Bands 1963–1967 ==
=== Karl King & the Vendettas ===
In early 1963, King joined his first group, The Vendettas, who were based in South London. In the early summer of 1963 the group landed a residency at The Mitre, a pub in Greenwich, near the Blackwall Tunnel. They played there a number of times a week for several months. It was there that they were spotted by TV-personality and writer Dan Farson. Later that year they became the resident group at The Ancient Foresters pub in Bermondsey, and they also started to play at Dan Farson's pub, The Waterman's Arms, on the Isle of Dogs in London's East End.

Having already built up a good reputation and following locally, the group were booked to appear at the South London Beat Show on 24 November 1963 at Lewisham Town Hall, Catford, where they were on the bill together with the Cougars, Pete Budd & the Rebels and the Konrads, who included David Bowie in their line-up.

After becoming the group's manager, Dan Farson decided that in future they would be called "Karl King & The Vendettas". He thought that two "Ks" in Carl's name would be an eye catcher. In January and February 1964, he booked the group to play six days a week in "Nights at the Comedy", a variety show which he devised and staged at The Comedy Theatre in London's West End. Around early 1964 they recorded two singles for Decca Records which were never released.

=== The Druids ===
In September 1964, King started to rehearse with the Druids. He did his first gig with the Druids in early October 1964 and was lead singer until the group finally split up in September 1965.

=== The Meaning ===
After the Druids split up in September 1965, King joined a group called the Meaning, who were based around Walton-on-Thames, Surrey. The Meaning were booked to play at a number of weekend shows held by Radio London at the Wimbledon Palais, and in May they paid for a session at Oak Studios in Morden, where they recorded cover versions of Barbara Lewis' "Hello Stranger" and The Temptations' "I Wanna Love I Can See", which were never released but the latter can now be found on YouTube.

=== Recordings CBS 1966–67 ===
In the meantime, The Meaning's demo record had begun to circulate and found its way to Des Champ at CBS Records in London. After a short audition in the late summer of 1966, CBS offered King a recording contract for three single releases. The first single included two new songs written by well-established songwriters. A ballad called "Keep It Coming", written by American Laurence Weiss, and a blues-rock number, "Out of my Depth", by the British duo of Billy Martin and Phil Coulter. "Keep It Coming" was chosen as the A-side (CBS 202407 – released November 1966). In recent years, however, "Out of my Depth" has become a minor cult item and has been re-released on several compilation albums.

The first single received positive reviews in the record press, but it failed to get many airplays The A-side of King's second single was "You and Me" (written by Farrell, Adams & Kusik) with a cover of Duke Ellington's "Satin Doll" as the B-side (CBS 202553 – released February 1967).

Although it got some decent reviews it did not make any commercial inroads.

=== Carl King Projection ===
To promote the second single, King formed a backing band called the Projection with whom he played a series of gigs during February and March 1967, including Liverpool's Cavern Club on 12 February 1967. However, due to managerial disagreements and health problems things failed to work out. In April 1967, King pulled out completely and a third projected single was never recorded.

== After 1967 ==
After quitting the music industry in the UK in 1967, King moved to Denmark in 1969. He now lives near Aabenraa, Denmark, and is a member of the local hobby band, Out of Time. The band played its first gig in April 1999.

King released a limited edition single CD on 21 April 2012 for Record Store Day 2012. The first song, "The Starman (A teasing tribute to Bowie)" is dedicated to David Bowie, who started his career at the same time as King in South East London in the early 1960s.

== Band members ==
Karl King & the Vendettas 1963–1964 Carl King (vocals), Chris Plum (lead guitar), Al J. Butten (rhythm guitar & vocals), Nick Weston (bass guitar & vocals), Willy (surname unknown) drums

In March 1963, Willy was replaced by Tony Day on drums. The line-up then remained unchanged until September 1964.

The Druids 1964–1965 The Druids had also existed since 1962. For a while they had had a lead vocalist called Dave Anthony, but the line-up on their two single releases for Parlophone, and when Carl joined them in the September 1964, was: Carl King (vocals), Brian Mixter (lead guitar), Ken Griffiths (rhythm guitar & vocals), Gearie Jay Kenworthy (bass guitar & vocals), Jeff Kane (drums)

The Meaning 1966 In March 1966 the line-up was: Carl King (vocals), Ken Griffiths (guitar & vocals), Rod Roach (guitar & vocals), Phil (bass guitar), Barry Gilford (drums)

The Carl King Projection 1967 Carl King (vocals), Rod Roach (guitar & vocals), Ken Griffiths (guitar & vocals), Pete Hollis (bass & vocals), Pete Phillips (drums)
