= HMS San Domingo =

One ship of the Royal Navy has borne the name HMS San Domingo, after the Battle of San Domingo, whilst another was planned but never completed:

- HMS San Domingo (1809) was a 74-gun third rate launched in 1809 and sold in 1816.
- HMS San Domingo was to have been a Battle-class destroyer. She was laid down in 1944 but was cancelled in 1945.
