= King Carl =

King Carl or King Karl may refer to:

== Attested Swedish kings ==
- Karl Sverkersson (c. 1130 – 1167; r. 1161–1167)
- Karl Knutsson (c. 1408 – 1470), King of Sweden (r. 1448–1457, 1464–1465, 1467–1470) and King of Norway (r. 1449–1450)
- Carl IX of Sweden (1550–1611; r. 1604–1611)
- Carl XI of Sweden (1655–1697; r. 1660–1697)
- Carl XII of Sweden (1682–1718; r. 1697–1718)
- Carl XIII (1748–1818), King of Sweden (r. 1809–1818) and King of Norway (r. 1814–1818)
- Carl XV (1826–1872; r. 1859–1872), King of Sweden and Norway

== Legendary Swedish kings ==
- Karl I to Karl VI, legendary Swedish kings listed in Historia de omnibus Gothorum Sueonumque regibus

== Other people ==
- Karl I of Austria (1887–1922; r. 1916–1918), King of Bohemia, King of Croatia, and King of Hungary

== See also ==
- Carl X Gustav (1622–1660; r. 1654–1660), King of Sweden
- Carl XIV John (1763–1844; r. 1818–1844), King of Sweden and Norway
- Carl XVI Gustaf (born 1946; r. 1973–present), King of Sweden
- Carol I of Romania (1839–1914; r. 1881–1914), King of Romania
- Carol II of Romania (1893–1953; r. 1930–1940), King of Romania
- Carl King (disambiguation)
- Karl C. King (1897–1974), American politician
- Karl King (1891–1971), American composer
- Karl King-Nabors, American politician
- King Charles (disambiguation)
- Prince Karl (disambiguation)
