= HMS St Joseph =

Two ships of the Royal Navy have borne the name HMS St Joseph:

- HMS St Joseph (1696) was an 8-gun sloop captured in 1696 and sold in 1699.
- HMS St Joseph (1704) was a 4-gun hoy purchased in 1704 and sold in 1710.

== See also ==
- HMS San Josef was a 114-gun first rate captured from the Spanish in 1797. She was used as a gunnery training ship from 1837 and was broken up in 1849.
