= HMS St Jacob =

Three ships of the Royal Navy have borne the name HMS St Jacob, after Saint Jacob:

- HMS St Jacob (1666) was a 4-gun fireship captured in 1666 and sold in 1667.
- HMS St Jacob (1667) was a 4-gun fireship purchased in 1667 and expended that same year.
- HMS St Jacob (1672) was a 6-gun dogger captured in 1672 and sold in 1674.
