= Prince Charles (disambiguation) =

Prince Charles is the former title of Charles III (born 1948), King of the United Kingdom and the other Commonwealth realms.

Prince Charles may also refer to:

== People ==
- Charles James, Duke of Cornwall & Rothesay (born and died 1629), son of Charles I of England and Henrietta Maria
- Charles Edward Stuart "Bonnie Prince Charlie" (1720–1788)
- Charles, Prince of Viana (1421–1461)
- Prince Charles of Castile, later Charles V, Holy Roman Emperor (1500–1558)
- Prince Charles d'Aremberg (died 1669), definitor-general and Commissary of the Capuchin order
- Charles Stuart, Duke of Cambridge (1660–1661), son of James, Duke of York (later King James II of England)
- Charles Stuart, Duke of Kendal (1666–1667), brother of the above
- Charles Stuart, Duke of Cambridge (1677), brother of the above
- Prince Charles of Denmark (1680–1729)
- Prince Charles William of Hesse-Darmstadt (1693–1707)
- Prince Charles Alexander of Lorraine (1712–1780), son of Leopold Joseph, Duke of Lorraine and Élisabeth Charlotte d'Orléans
- Charles-Joseph, 7th Prince of Ligne (1735–1814), Field marshal and writer, and member of a princely family of Hainaut
- Prince Charles of Hesse-Kassel (1744–1836)
- Charles Ferdinand, Duke of Berry (1778–1820)
- Prince Charles of Prussia (1801–1883)
- Prince Charles of Hesse and by Rhine (1809–1877)
- Charles III, Prince of Monaco (1818–1889)
- Prince Charles, Duke of Penthièvre (1820–1828)
- Charles Edward, Duke of Saxe-Coburg and Gotha (1884–1954), grandson of Queen Victoria
- Prince Charles, Count of Flanders (1903–1983), former Belgian regent, second son of Albert I, King of the Belgians and Duchess Elisabeth
- Prince Charles Philippe, Duke of Nemours (1905–1970)
- Prince Charles of Luxembourg (1927–1977)
- Prince Carlos Hugo, Duke of Parma (1930–2010)
- Charles, Prince Napoléon (born 1950)
- Prince Carlo, Duke of Castro (born 1963)
- Prince Charles-Henri de Lobkowicz (born 1964)
- Prince Carlos, Duke of Parma (born 1970)
- Prince Hugo de Bourbon de Parme (Carlos Hugo Roderik Sybren) (born 1997)
- Prince Charles of Luxembourg (born 2020), son of Grand Duke Guillaume V of Luxembourg and second in line to the throne of Luxembourg
- Charles Williams (boxer) (born 1962), professional boxer, known as "Prince Charles"

== Places ==
- Prince Charles Island, Nunavut, Canada
- Prince Charles, Edmonton, a neighborhood in the city of Edmonton, Canada
- Prince Charles Secondary School, former name of Kootenay River Secondary School, Creston, British Columbia, Canada

== Other uses ==
- Prince Charles (Q-ship), a British collier converted for naval use in World War I

== See also ==
- Charles and Diana (disambiguation)
- Charles, Prince of Wales (disambiguation)
- Prince Carlos (disambiguation) for people known as Prince Carlos or Prince Carlo
- Prince Karl (disambiguation) for people known as Prince Karl or Prince Karel
- Princess Charles (disambiguation)
- King Charles (disambiguation)
- Lord Charles (disambiguation)
- Sir Charles (disambiguation)
- Charles (disambiguation)
