= Gold Coast in World War II =

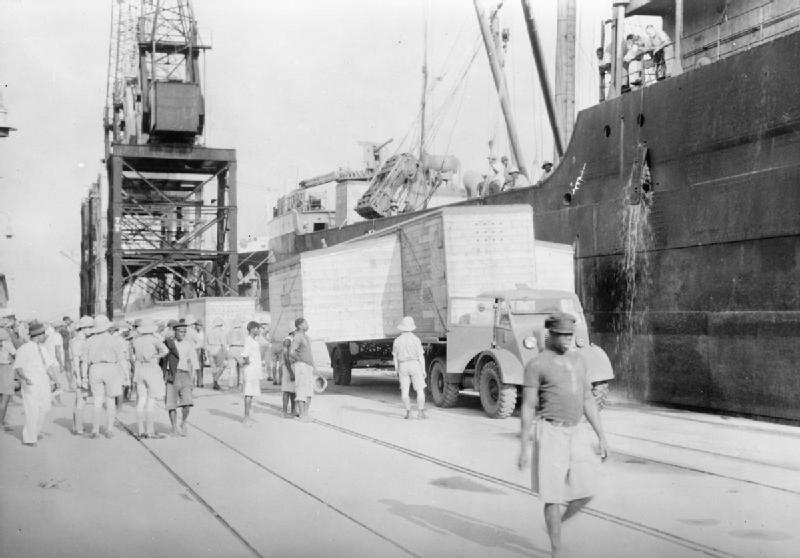
British war material being offloaded in Takoradi in the Gold Coast

The involvement of the Gold Coast (modern-day Ghana) in World War II began with the declaration of war on Nazi Germany by the British Empire in September, 1939. Though no combat occurred in the Gold Coast colony, the colony supplied resources and manpower for the Allies.

== Home Front ==
Two days after the German invasion of Poland on 1 September 1939, the United Kingdom declared war on Nazi Germany. Due to the German loss in World War I, the country possessed no African colonies. German Togoland was added to the Gold Coast under British colonial rule. The Gold Coast still came to have an involvement in the war.

Accra, the capital of the Gold Coast, hosted Allied aircraft as they flew between the United States, Europe and the Pacific Ocean. Colonial troops also played an important role in the taking control of Italian East Africa, particularly what is now Ethiopia.

The Gold Coast benefited financially from the war. By 1945, increased British government spending and the introduction of an income tax led to an expansion of local revenue.

World War II changed the demographics of the Gold Coast, concentrating workers in a few large towns and cities. The colonial government launched a program to deal with a housing shortage, by constructing inexpensive but sturdy local building material (an earthquake in 1939 had badly damaged infrastructure in many cities and towns). In 1943, British architect Maxwell Fry launched a simultaneous effort to plan the Gold Coast's cities. Fry prepared blueprints for the future layout and development of Accra, Kumasi and Sekondi.

== Industrial development ==
Prior to 1943, Gold Coast was an extractive colony producing gold and cocoa. During the war, U-boat attacks limited commercial shipping to West Africa. As a result, the Colonial Development Fund was used to finance the West African Institute of Industries, Arts and Social Sciences, in 1943, under the direction of British official Herman Meyerowitz. Although the institute was intended for all British colonies in West Africa, it benefited the Gold Coast disproportionately. The institute lasted for two years, until Meyerowitz's death in 1945. During that time, it supported the development of a local tile, brick and ceramic industry in Ghana and cotton textiles in Togo. The construction of new buildings in Gold Coast cities also benefited the lumber industry, which was able to export four million cubic feet of timber in 1946.

== See also ==
- 1948 Accra riots
