= HMS St George =

Eight ships of the Royal Navy have been named HMS St George, after Saint George, the patron saint of England:

- English ship St George (1622), a 60-gun ship built in 1622 and sunk in 1697 as a blockship.
- HMS St George (1626), a ship captured in 1626 and listed until 1632.
- HMS St George was a 96-gun first rate launched in 1668 as HMS Charles and renamed in 1687. Rebuilt several times and broken up in 1774.
- HMS St George (1701) was a hulk at Harwich bought in 1701 from M. Stevens; she was sunk in 1716 as a foundation for Chatham Dockyard.
- HMS St George (1785) was a 98-gun second rate, launched in 1785 and wrecked in 1811.
- HMS St George was originally HMS Britannia of 1762, renamed HMS Princess Royal in 1812, HMS St George a few days later, and then HMS Barfleur in 1819. She was broken up in 1825.
- HMS St George (1840) was a 120-gun first rate, launched in 1840 and sold in 1883.
- HMS St George (1892) was a first-class cruiser of the Edgar class, launched in 1892 and scrapped in 1920.
- HMS St George (shore establishment) was a shore based training school on the Isle of Man set up by the Royal Navy in Sep 1939.

== See also ==
- HMS St George, a former Royal Navy shore establishment in Eastney, Portsmouth, Hampshire, England
- HMS Prince George
- HMS Royal George
- USS St. George (CVE-17)
