= Charles (1811 ship) =

History

United Kingdom
- Name: Charles
- Launched: 1804, Fowey
- Fate: Last listed in 1825

General characteristics
- Tons burthen: 11853/94, or 119 (bm)
- Armament: Armed schooner: 10 × 12-pounder carronades; Mercantile: 4 × 4-pounder guns

Charles was a schooner launched in 1804, possibly under another name. Between 1811 and 1814 she served as HM hired armed schooner Charles. She then returned to mercantile service. She initially traded with the Continent and Newfoundland, but for the remainder of her career she sailed between Bristol and Palermo. She was last listed in 1825.

== Career ==
The Royal Navy employed the hired armed schooner on contract between 23 October 1811 and 4 May 1814.

In December 1811, Lieutenant John Little was appointed captain of Charles, for service on the Downs station. Charles recaptured two merchant vessels, and witnessed the capture of two French privateers.

One of the recaptured vessels was Nancy, Morrison, master, which Charles recaptured on 8 October 1813.

In December 1813, Charles was attached to the fleet under Admiral Young, anchored off Walcheren. In the following spring she carried to France part of the suite of Louis XVIII. On Little's return from this mission, he was appointed to the schooner HMS Whiting.

After the end of her contract with the Navy, Charles returned to mercantile service. She first appeared in Lloyd's Register (LR) in 1814.

Year	Master	Owner	Trade	Source & notes
1814	T.Atherdeen	T.Lloyd	London–Rotterdam	LR; raised 1814
1815	T.Atherdeen; Ambier	T.Lloyd	London–Rotterdam	LR; raised 1814
1818	R.Burton	Bickley	Bristol–Newfoundland; Bristol–Palermo	LR; raised 1814, good repair 1815, & repairs 1818
1820	R.Burton	C.Harvey	Bristol–Palermo	LR; raised 1814, good repair 1815, & small repair 1818

Charles was last listed in 1825 with data unchanged since 1820.
