= HMS San Antonio (1762) =

Ship of the line of the Royal Navy

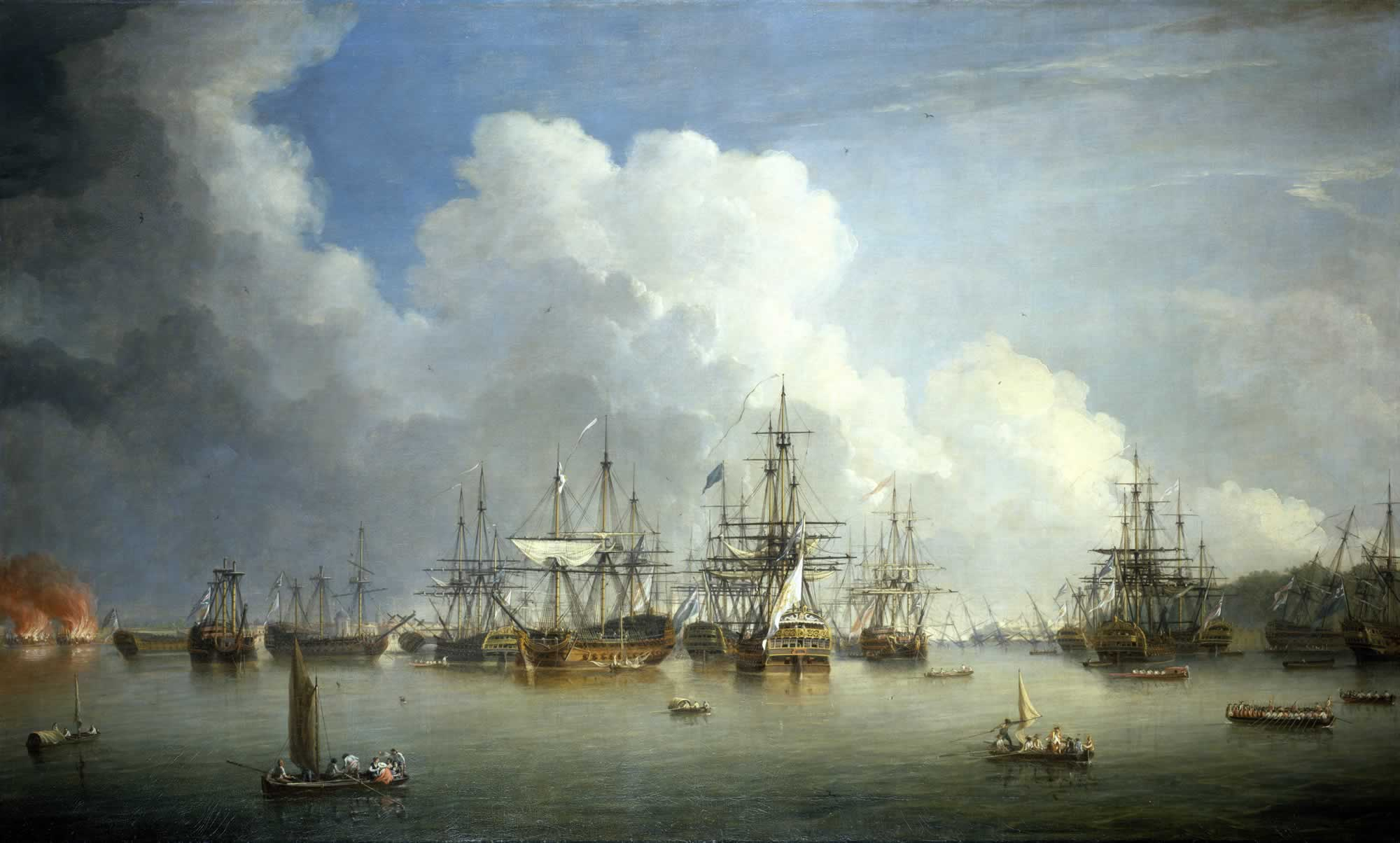
- Painting by Dominic Serres depicting captured Spanish warships at Havana; San Antonio is possibly among them

History

Spain
- Name: San Antonio
- Captured: 13 August 1762, by Royal Navy

Great Britain
- Name: San Antonio
- Acquired: 13 August 1762
- Fate: Sold, 1775

General characteristics
- Class & type: 64-gun Third Rate ship of the line
- Tons burthen: 139212/94 (bm)
- Length: 159 ft 6 in (48.62 m) (gundeck)
- Beam: 44 ft 6 in (13.56 m)
- Depth of hold: 20 ft (6.1 m)
- Propulsion: Sails
- Sail plan: Full-rigged ship
- Armament: 64 guns of various weights of shot

San Antonio was a 64-gun ship of the line of the Spanish Navy. On 13 August 1762, she was captured by the Royal Navy, and commissioned as the third-rate HMS San Antonio. She was sold out of the British navy in 1775.

== Bibliography ==
- Winfield, Rif (2007). British Warships in the Age of Sail 1714–1792: Design, Construction, Careers and Fates. Seaforth Publishing. ISBN 978-1-84415-700-6.
- Winfield, Rif; Tredrea, John M.; García-Torralba Pérez, Enrique & Blasco Felip, Manuel (2023). Spanish Warships in the Age of Sail 1700—1860: Design, Construction, Careers and Fates. Seaforth Publishing. ISBN 978-1-5267-9078-1.
