= List of British Empire corps of the Second World War =

This is a list of corps serving within the armies of the British Empire during the Second World War.

A Corps was either a temporary military formation created for combat, or an "administrative" formation that coordinated specialist military functions across a national military force. A combat Corps was composed of specialist units from various "administrative" Corps from combat arms, combat support arms and combat services. Combat Arms were formation sized units from the Corps of infantry and armour, usually 2 or more divisions in strength. Combat Support Arms were smaller units from the Corps of artillery, engineers, signals, intelligence or reconnaissance. Combat Services were units from the Corps of medicine, general services, ordnance, pioneers, logistics and other more specialized functions. For example, I Canadian Corps consisted of 1 infantry division, 1 armour division, 1 armour brigade and Corps Troops (20 plus companies from the Corps of engineers, signals, medicine, military police, etc...)

Military formations within the British Empire were composed of a changing mix of units from across Britain, its colonies and the dominions. As a result, military formations within the Empire and Commonwealth are not easily attributable to specific Imperial or national entities and naming conventions do not necessarily correlate with modern country names.

== British Army ==
Field Corps

- I Airborne Corps
- 1 Anti-Aircraft Corps
- 2 Anti-Aircraft Corps
- 3 Anti-Aircraft Corps
- I Corps
- II Corps
- III Corps
- IV Corps
- V Corps
- VII Corps
- VIII Corps
- IX Corps
- X Corps
- XI Corps
- XII Corps
- XIII Corps
- XXX Corps

Combat Arms

- Army Air Corps
- Corps of Royal Marines
- Royal Armoured Corps
- Royal Tank Corps

Combat Support Arms

- Reconnaissance Corps
- Royal Engineers
- Intelligence Corps
- Royal Artillery
- Royal Corps of Signals

Combat Services

- Army Catering Corps
- Auxiliary Territorial Service
- Corps of Military Police
- General Service Corps
- Military Provost Staff Corps
- Pioneer Corps
- Royal Army Medical Corps
- Royal Army Ordnance Corps
- Royal Army Pay Corps
- Royal Army Service Corps
- Royal Army Veterinary Corps
- Royal Electrical and Mechanical Engineers

Other

- Army Educational Corps
- Mechanised Transport Corps
- Non-Combatant Corps
- Royal Army Dental Corps
- Royal Army Physical Training Corps
- Royal Electrical and Mechanical Engineers

== Imperial and Dominion ==
=== Australian Army ===
Field Corps

- I Australian Corps
- II Australian Corps
- III Australian Corps
- ANZAC Corps

Combat Arms

- Royal Australian Armoured Corps
- Royal Australian Infantry Corps
- Australian Army Aviation Corps

Combat Support Arms

- Australian Machine Gun Corps
- Royal Australian Artillery
- Royal Australian Corps of Signals
- Royal Australian Engineers
- Australian Intelligence Corps

Combat Services

- Australian Instructional Corps
- Australian Army Band Corps
- Australian Army Catering Corps
- Australian Army Veterinary Corps
- Australian Staff Corps
- Corps of Staff Cadets
- Royal Australian Army Chaplains Department
- Royal Australian Army Dental Corps
- Royal Australian Army Medical Corps
- Royal Australian Army Nursing Corps
- Royal Australian Army Ordnance Corps
- Royal Australian Army Pay Corps
- Royal Australian Army Service Corps
- Royal Australian Corps of Military Police
- Royal Australian Corps of Transport
- Royal Australian Electrical and Mechanical Engineers
- Royal Australian Survey Corps
- Women's Royal Australian Army Corps

Other

- Civil Construction Corps

=== Canadian Army ===
Field Corps

- Canadian Corps
- I Canadian Corps
- II Canadian Corps

Combat Arms

- Canadian Infantry Corps
- Canadian Armoured Corps

Combat Support Arms

- Canadian Intelligence Corps
- Royal Canadian Artillery
- Corps of Royal Canadian Engineers
- Royal Canadian Corps of Signals

Combat Services

- Canadian Army Chaplain Corps
- Canadian Provost Corps
- Canadian Women's Army Corps
- Central Canada Aircraft Detection Corps(RCAF)
- Corps of Military Staff Clerks
- Corps of Royal Canadian Electrical and Mechanical Engineers
- Royal Canadian Army Medical Corps
- Royal Canadian Army Pay Corps
- Royal Canadian Army Service Corps
- Royal Canadian Army Veterinary Corps
- Royal Canadian Dental Corps
- Royal Canadian Ordnance Corps
- Royal Canadian Postal Corps

Other

- Canadian Technical Training Corps
- Canadian Officers' Training Corps
- Canadian Forestry Corps
- Corps of Canadian Fire Fighters (auxiliary to UK)

=== Army of India ===
Field Corps

- Indian III Corps
- IV Corps
- Indian XV Corps
- Indian XXI Corps
- Indian XXXIII Corps
- Indian XXXIV Corps
- Burma Corps

Combat Arms

- Infantry
- Indian Armoured Corps

Combat Support Arms

- Indian Army Air Defence
- Indian Army Aviation Corps
- Indian Army Corps of Signals
- Indian Army Corps of Engineers
- Regiment of Indian Artillery

Combat Services

- Burma Hospital Corps
- Corps of Indian Military Police
- Corps of Indian Electrical and Mechanical Engineers
- Indian Army Dental Corps
- Indian Army Hospital Corps
- Indian Army Medical Corps
- Indian Army Ordnance Corps
- Royal Indian Army Service Corps
- Military Farm Corps
- Pioneer Corps
- Remount Veterinary Corps
- Women's Auxiliary Corps (India)

=== New Zealand Military Forces ===
Field Corps

- New Zealand Corps
- ANZAC Corps

Combat Arms

- New Zealand Armoured Corps
- New Zealand war-raised battalions

Combat Support Arms

- New Zealand Engineers
- New Zealand Intelligence Corps
- Royal Regiment of New Zealand Artillery
- Royal New Zealand Corps of Signals

Combat Services

- New Zealand Military Police
- New Zealand Electrical and Mechanical Engineers
- New Zealand Staff Corps
- New Zealand Veterinary Corps
- Royal New Zealand Army Medical Corps
- Royal New Zealand Army Nursing Corps
- Royal New Zealand Army Ordnance Corps
- Royal New Zealand Corps of Transport
- Women's Auxiliary Army Corps (New Zealand)

=== South African Army ===
Field Corps

- Cape Corps
- South African Coast Defence Corps

Combat Arms

- South African Tank Corps
- Infantry Branch (Citizen Force)

Combat Support Arms

- South African Corps of Signals
- South African Engineer Corps
- South African Intelligence Corps

Combat Services

- Army Postal Service
- Indian and Malay Service Corps
- Native Military Corps
- Q Services Corps
- South African Corps of Mechanics
- South African Corps of Military Police
- South African Medical Corps
- South African Ordnance Corps
- South Africa Pay Corps
- South African Service Corps
- South Africa Veterinary Corps
- Technical Services Corps ("T Corps")
- Women's Auxiliary Army Service
- Women's Auxiliary Military Police Corps

=== Colonies and Protectorates ===
Field Corps (not all standard corps size)

- Bikaner Camel Corps
- Ceylon Planters' Rifle Corps
- East Arab Corps
- Hong Kong Volunteer Defence Corps
- Somaliland Camel Corps

Combat Support Arms

- East African Artillery
- Rhodesian Armoured Corps
- West African Artillery
- West African Engineers

Combat Services

- African Pioneer Corps
- East African Army Service Corps
- East African Military Labour Corps
- Fijian Labour Corps
- Gilbert Islands Labour Corps
- Mauritius Civil Labour Corps
- Northern Rhodesian African Labour Corps
- Solomon Islands Labour Corps
- Southern Rhodesian Labour Corps
- West African Military Labour Corps
- West African Army Service Corps
- Women's Auxiliary Service (Burma)

== See also ==
- List of British Empire divisions in the Second World War
- Military history of the British Commonwealth in the Second World War
