= Merlyn Evans =

Welsh painter, printmaker and educator (1910–1973)

- Born: Merlyn Oliver Evans; 13 March 1910; Llandaff, Cardiff, Wales
- Died: 31 October 1973 (aged 63); Hampstead, London, England
- Spouses: Phyllis Sullivan (m. 1934–1945); Marjorie Few (m. 1950)
- Children: 2, including Eldred Evans

Academic background
- Education: Glasgow School of Art; Royal College of Art

Academic work
- Institutions: Reimann School of Art and Design; Natal Technical College; Royal College of Art
- Military career
- Allegiance: Union of South Africa
- Branch: South African Army
- Service years: 1942–1945
- Units: Signal Formation; Engineer Corps,14th Armoured Brigade
- Conflict: Second World War; North African campaign; [Italian campaign
- Awards: Italy Star
- Website: www.merlynevans.co.uk

Merlyn Oliver Evans (13 March 1910 – 31 October 1973) was a Welsh painter, printmaker, sculptor and educator.

== Early life and education ==
Evans was born 13 March 1910 in Llandaff, Cardiff to Pryce Oliver Evans, an analytical chemist, and Minnie Veronica Evans (née Edwards), a former nurse. The family moved to Rutherglen, near Glasgow, in 1913.

From the age of 10, Evans received free private drawing and painting tuition from John and Charles Houston. Educated at Stonelaw Public School and Allan Glen's School, he enrolled at the Glasgow School of Art in 1927.

By 1930, Evans had developed an abstract style informed by the notion that art should engage with life and reflect psychological, ethical, and political concerns. Exhibiting at the Royal Scottish Academy in 1930, he was awarded in 1931 a scholarship to study at the Royal College of Art (RCA). He was also awarded the Haldane travelling scholarship. Evans' visits to Berlin, Copenhagen, Paris and Sweden during 1931 and 1932 further cemented his commitment to his personal form of abstraction.

Enrolling at the RCA in 1932, Evans was not permitted to study sculpture and instead took private lessons from a stonemason. (Note: Also cited as having studied sculpture at RCA.) Although abstraction was discouraged at the RCA, he continued to use the style independently. He left the RCA in 1933. (Note: Also cited as leaving in 1934.)

== Career ==
Exhibiting at the London International Surrealist Exhibition in 1936, the following year Evans exhibited with the Artists' International Association, The London Group, and at the Surrealist Poems and Objects exhibition at the London Gallery. He was associated with, but not a member of, the surrealist group of Roland Penrose, Humphrey Jennings and Herbert Read. Teaching at Wilson's Grammar School from 1934 to 1936, Evans frequently visited Paris during this period. In Paris, he worked under Stanley William Hayter at Atelier 17, where he met Wassily Kandinsky and Piet Mondrian. Evans taught at the London Reimann School of Art and Design from 1936 to 1938.

In May 1938, Evans and his family relocated to Durban in order for him to teach at Natal Technical College. In August 1942, he enlisted in the Signal Formation of the South African Army. Later transferring to the 14th Armoured Brigade in the Engineer Corps, he fought in the North African and Italian campaign. Awarded the Italy Star, Evans was transferred to the War Records in Rome In August 1945. He drew and painted throughout his service, including a 1945 portrait of Giorgio di Chirico whilst stationed in Rome. Demobilised the same year, he returned to London. (Note: Also cited as being demobilised in 1946.) From 1965 until his death, Evans was a painting tutor at the RCA.

== Personal life ==
Evans always referred to himself as Welsh.

In 1934, he married the artist Phyllis Sullivan, whom he met while studying at the RCA. The couple had two children, the eldest of whom was the architect Eldred Evans. Evans and Sullivan's marriage was dissolved in 1945. (Note: Also cited as having divorced.)

Evans later married the concert pianist Marjorie Few in 1950.

On 31 October 1973, Evans died at his home in Hampstead, London aged 63.
