= South African Army corps and branches =

Functional branches of the South African Army

The South African Army is organised into functional branches known as corps. A corps groups personnel and (in most cases) units that share a common combat or support role. Some corps, such as the SA Staff Corps, have little or no unit structure of their own and instead provide officers and specialists to headquarters and other units.

Since 1912 the army's corps and related branches have been formed, renamed, amalgamated and disbanded many times. After 1994, under the South African National Defence Force (SANDF), several corps environments were also reorganised into formations (for example the South African Army Infantry Formation and South African Army Signal Formation), which are command structures rather than traditional corps titles. The list below covers corps and branches established from 1912 onward; names shown in bold are those treated as currently active in earlier versions of this article.

The SA Defence Act Amendment Act, No. 22 of 1922 reorganised the Permanent Force of the Union Defence Force. From 1 February 1923 that Permanent Force was a joint service organisation and consisted of:

- the SA Staff Corps,
- SA Instructional Corps,
- SA Naval Service,
- SA Field Artillery,
- 1st Regiment, SAMR,
- SA Permanent Garrison Artillery,
- South African Engineer Corps,
- South African Air Force,
- SA Service Corps,
- SA Medical Corps,
- SA Ordnance Corps,
- SA Veterinary Corps,
- SA Administrative, Pay and Clerical Corps.

== Post-1994 organisation ==
Under the SANDF, Army capability is commonly described both by corps affiliation and by formation. Formations such as the South African Army Infantry Formation, South African Army Armour Formation, South African Army Artillery Formation, South African Army Air Defence Artillery Formation, South African Army Engineer Formation and South African Army Signal Formation provide command and force-structure groupings for units that still draw corps identity from the older branch system.

Signals organisation illustrates the distinction. In the late 1990s the Department of Defence grouped telecommunications, information technology and related information environments into the joint-service Command and Management Information Systems Division (CMIS Division) from 1 April 1999, taking the Corps of Signals out of Army command. Elements returned to the services on 28 March 2008, and from 1 April 2008 the Army again commanded the signals environment as the South African Army Signal Formation. (Note: In the late 1990s, the SA Department of Defence decided to group various environments together, elements which it felt belonged together such as the environments of telecommunication, information technology (IT), registries, documentation services, libraries and electronic warfare, in other words, all forms of communication. This led to the establishment of the joint-service Command and Management Information Systems Division (CMIS Division) on 1 April 1999, its task being to deliver communications and info systems for the entire SANDF. The Corps of Signals left the command of the South African Army and was totally incorporated (personnel and all equipment) into the CMIS Division. On 28 March 2008, certain elements of CMIS Division migrated back to the various services. The South African Corps of Signals returned to the command of the South African Army as from 1 April 2008, to be known as the South African Army Signal Formation.)

== List of corps and branches ==
Corps and branches are grouped below by role. Currently active corps names are in bold.

=== Staff ===
- Permanent Force Staff (1912–23)
- **SA Staff Corps** (SAStC) (formed 1923)
- SA Instructional Corps (1923–54) – incorporated into SA Infantry Corps

=== Combat services ===
==== Artillery ====
- Field Artillery Branch (Citizen Force) (1913–34) – incorporated into SAA
- SA Field Artillery (1915–19)
- SA Heavy Artillery (1915–19)
- SA Field Artillery (1923–34) – incorporated into SA Artillery
- SA Permanent Garrison Artillery (1921–34) – incorporated into SAA
- SA Garrison Artillery (1913–34) – incorporated into SAA
- **South African Artillery** (SAA) (formed 1934)
- **SA Anti-Aircraft** (formed 1984)

==== Mounted Rifles ====
- SA Mounted Rifles (1913–26)
- Mounted Rifles Branch (Citizen Force) (1913–35) – incorporated into infantry

==== Dismounted Rifles ====
- Dismounted Rifles Branch (Citizen Force) (1913–29)

==== Infantry ====
- Infantry Branch (Citizen Force) (1913–43) – incorporated into SA Armoured Corps
- **SA Infantry Corps** (established 1954)

==== Armour ====
- SA Tank Corps (1940–43)
- **South African Armoured Corps** (formed 1943) – included infantry until 1954

=== Combat support ===
==== Engineers ====
- SA Engineer Corps (1914–16)
- **South African Engineer Corps** (formed 1923)

==== Signals ====
- Communication Branch (Citizen Force) (1913–23)
- SA Field Post and Telegraph Corps (1914–19)
- **South African Corps of Signals** (formed 1923) (Note: In 1940, the Signals Branch of the South African Army College moved from the College to Potchefstroom where it became the Signals Training Centre, this name being changed to School of Signals in 1944. The School of Signals again became a branch of the College in 1946 and, in January 1947, it was once more moved to Potchefstroom where it became a branch of the School of Artillery and Armour.)
- South African Army Signal Formation
- SA Military Pigeon Service (c. 1939–1945)

=== Supporting services ===
==== Administration and logistics ====
- SA Service Corps (1913–39) – incorporated into 'Q' Services Corps
- SA Ordnance Corps (1923–39) – incorporated into 'Q' Services Corps
- SA Corps of Mechanics (1939) – incorporated into 'Q' Services Corps
- 'Q' Services Corps (1939–49) – later Administrative Services Corps
- Administrative Services Corps (1949–75)
- Army Postal Service (1940–45)
- **Personnel Services Corps** (formed 1975)
- **Ordnance Services Corps** (formed 1975) (Note: The role of the Ordnance Services Corps “is the effective acquisition, receipt, storing, safekeeping, preservation, maintenance, accounting, distribution and disposal of clothing, accommodation, ammunition, vehicles, fuel and spares within the Army. The OSC also delivers specialised services to the Army, which includes computer services, Air Supply and Nature Conservation.")
- **Technical Services Corps** (formed 1939)
- **SA Caterers Corps** (formed 1969)
- **SA Ammunition Corps** (formed 1973)
- **Corps of Professional Officers** (formed 1975)

==== Medical ====
- SA Medical Corps (1913–70) – incorporated into SA Medical Service
- SA Veterinary Corps (1913–46) – incorporated into SAMC
- SA Military Nursing Service (1914–70)
- SA Military Nursing Corps (1970–72) – incorporated into SAMS

==== Financial ====
- SA Administrative, Pay and Clerical Corps (1923–39) – incorporated into QSC
- SA Pay Corps (1940–45)
- Finance Services Corps (1972–75)
- **Finance Services Corps** (formed 1979)

==== Military police ====
- **SA Corps of Military Police** (formed 1938)

==== Intelligence ====
- SA Intelligence Corps (1940–45)
- **SA Army Intelligence Corps** (formed 1977)

==== Chaplains ====
- SA Corps of Chaplains (1946–68) – incorporated into SA Chaplains Service

==== Science ====
- SA Corps of Scientists (1947–72)

==== Women's services ====
- Women's Auxiliary Army Service (1940–47)
- Women's Auxiliary Military Police Corps (1942–46)
- Women's Defence Corps (1947–71)
- Civil Defence Corps (1971–77)
- SA Army Women's Corps (1977–98)

==== Special services ====
- **Special Service Corps** (established 1964)

==== Music ====
- **SA Corps of Bandsmen** (established 1969)

==== "Non-European" services ====
- South African Native Labour Corps (1915–19)
- Cape Corps (1940–50)
- Indian Service Corps (1940–42)
- Native Military Corps (1940–50)
- SA Cape Corps (1963–90s)
- SA Supporting Services Corps (1974–90s)
- SA Indian Corps (1975–90s)

==== Commandos ====
- Defence Rifle Associations (1913–49)
- Rifle Commandos (1949–58)
- Commandos (1958–2007)

== See also ==
- List of Helmet and Shoulder Flashes and Hackles of South African Military Units
- List of badges of the South African Army
- South African Army Infantry Formation
- South African Army Armour Formation
- South African Army Artillery Formation
- South African Army Signal Formation
