= Amie Siegel =

American filmmaker (born 1974)

Amie Siegel (born 1974) is an American artist. She was awarded a Guggenheim Fellowship in 2007. Siegel was born in Chicago, Illinois. She attended Bard College and the School of the Art Institute of Chicago.

== Recent exhibitions ==
- Provenance – Simon Preston Gallery, New York, 2013
- Metropolitan Museum of Art, New York, 2013
- Ricochet – Kunstmuseum Stuttgart, Stuttgart, 2016
- Swiss Institute Contemporary Art New York, 2016
- Winter – Guggenheim Museum Bilbao, Bilbao, 2017
- Gwangju Biennale, 2018
- Backstory – Thomas Dane Gallery, London, 2018
- Provenance – Tate St. Ives, St. Ives, 2019

== Collections ==
- Whitney Museum of American Art
- Guggenheim Museum
- Museum of Modern Art
- Tate Modern

== Festivals ==
- Cannes Film Festival
- Berlin International Film Festival

== Awards ==
- DAAD Berliner-Künstlerprogramm
- Creative Capital
- Harvard Film Study Center
- ICA Boston Foster Prize
- Guggenheim Fellowship, 2007
