= Truro Crown Court =

Court building in Truro, Cornwall, England

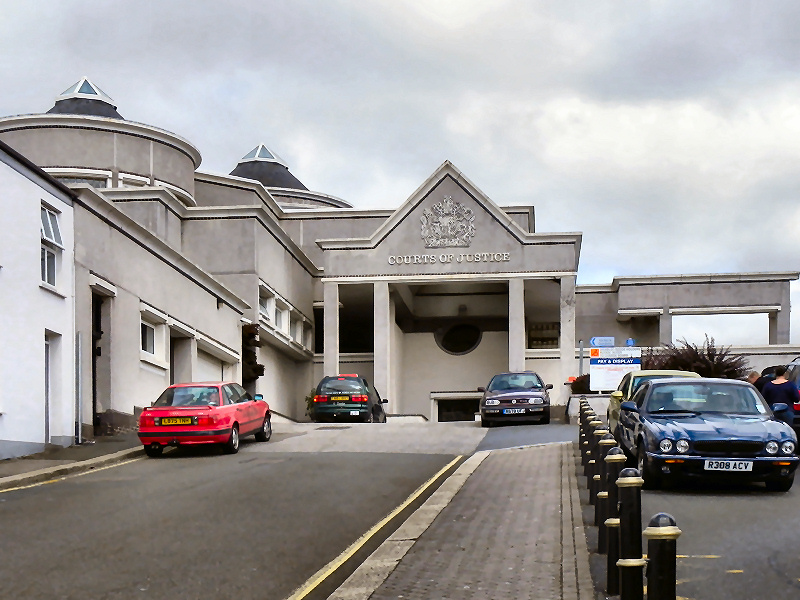
- Truro Crown Court

- Location within Cornwall
- 50.2655°N 5.0566°W
- Location: Edward Street, Truro

History
- Built: 1988

Site notes
- Architect(s): Eldred Evans and David Shalev
- Architectural style: Modernist style

Listed Building – Grade II*
- Official name: Truro Crown Courts
- Designated: 18 April 2018
- Reference no.: 1451232

Truro Crown Court is a Crown Court venue which deals with criminal cases at Edward Street in Truro, Cornwall, England. It is a Grade II* listed building.

== History ==
Until the late 1980s, judicial hearings in Cornwall were held in the old Shire Hall in Bodmin. However, as the number of court cases in Cornwall grew, it became necessary to commission a dedicated courthouse for criminal matters. The site selected by the Lord Chancellor's Department had been occupied by Truro Castle in the 13th century and, from around 1840, by a cattle market.

Construction on the new building began in February 1986. It was designed by Eldred Evans and David Shalev in the modernist style, built with walls covered in grey render at a cost of £4.9 million, and was completed in September 1988.

The design involved an asymmetrical main frontage facing down Edward Street. The left hand section was fronted by a relatively plain single storey wall, which projected forward in front of a two-storey rotunda with a conical roof. The right hand section featured a portico with a steep pediment containing a Royal coat of arms. Behind the main frontage, and largely out of sight, was a much large rotunda which formed the main circulation hub for the building. Internally, the building was laid out to accommodate four courtrooms. The design won the RIBA Building of the Year (a forerunner of the Stirling Prize) in 1988.

Notable cases have included the trial and conviction of four members of the pressure group, the Revived Cornish Stannary Parliament, in January 2002, for the theft of signs belonging to English Heritage. Cases also included the trial and conviction of Tyrone Bates, in March 2009, for the murder of his landlady, Stella Gleadall, the trial and conviction of Thomas Haigh, in February 2012, for the murder of drug dealers, Brett Flournoy and David Griffiths, and the trial and conviction of Lee Kendall, in January 2022, for murdering the prison resettlement officer, Michaela Hall.
