= Tate St Ives =

Modern art gallery in St Ives, Cornwall, England

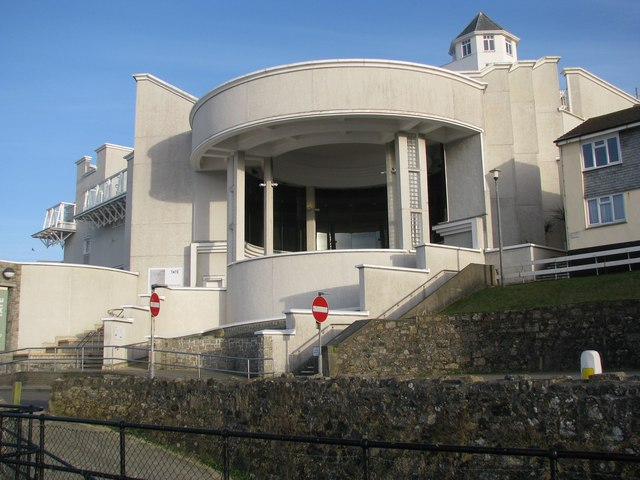
- Tate St Ives in 2009

- Location within Southwest Cornwall
- Established: 1993
- Location: St Ives, Cornwall, England, UK
- Coordinates: 50°12′53″N 5°28′57″W
- Visitors: 224,652 (2025)
- Architects: Original building: Eldred Evans and David Shalev; Extension: Jamie Fobert
- Website: tate.org.uk

Tate
- Tate Britain; Tate Liverpool; Tate Modern; Tate St Ives

Tate St Ives is an art gallery in St Ives, Cornwall, England, exhibiting work by modern British artists with links to the St Ives area. The Tate also took over management of another museum in the town, the Barbara Hepworth Museum and Sculpture Garden, in 1980.

The Tate St Ives was built between 1988 and 1993 on the site of an old gasworks and looks over Porthmeor beach. In 2015, it received funding for an expansion, doubling the size of the gallery, and closed in October 2015 for refurbishment. The gallery re-opened in October 2017 and is among the most visited attractions in the UK.

== History ==
In 1980, Tate group started to manage the Barbara Hepworth Museum and Sculpture Garden, dedicated to the life and work of the renowned St Ives artist. The group decided to open a museum in the town, to showcase local artists, especially those already held in their collection.

In 1988, the group purchased a former gasworks and commissioned architects Eldred Evans and David Shalev, to design a building for the gallery in a similar style to the gas works. The building began in 1991, funded by the European Regional Development Fund, the Henry Moore Foundation and donations from the public. It included a rotunda at the centre of the gallery, looking over Porthmeor Beach and was completed in 1993. The gallery opened in June 1993, the second of the Tate's regional galleries after Tate Liverpool, receiving more than 120,000 visitors before the end of the year.

In 1999, to celebrate the solar eclipse (as St Ives was predicted to be the first British town to witness the event), Tate St Ives held an exhibition called As Dark as Light, exhibiting work from Garry Fabian Miller, Gia Edzveradze and Yuko Shiraishi alongside art from local schoolchildren.

In 2012, Tate St Ives ran a competition for a design team to build a major extension, which was won by Jamie Fobert Architects. In January 2015, the Tate St Ives received £3.9 million to contribute towards the new extension, with the intention of doubling the available space in order to accommodate tourists throughout the year, without having to close between exhibitions. The building contract was awarded to BAM Construct UK, who would be adding a 1,200 square metres (13,000 sq ft) extension designed by Jamie Fobert, with the original architect's involvement in works to the existing building. The Tate St Ives was closed in October 2015 for these works and remained closed for two years.

Tate St Ives reopened in October 2017, with the inaugural exhibition in the new 500m2 gallery a solo show by contemporary sculptor Rebecca Warren, 'All that heaven allows'.

In July 2018, Tate St. Ives won the Art Fund Museum of the Year Prize, beating the other shortlisted museums (the Brooklands Museum, the Ferens Art Gallery, Glasgow Women's Library and the Postal Museum, London) to the £100,000 prize. Later that month, the Royal Institute of British Architects announced that the new Tate building had reached the shortlist for the 2018 Stirling Prize. It was beaten by the Bloomberg Building in London, by Foster + Partners. In 2019, Tate St Ives won a Civic Trust Award.

== Exhibitions ==
Notable exhibitions prior to the refurbishment include:

- Simon Carroll, 8 October 2005 – 15 January 2006
- The Dark Monarch - Magic and Modernity in British Art, 10 October 2009 – 10 January 2010
- The Indiscipline of Painting, 8 October 2011 – 3 January 2012 touring to Warwick Art Centre (2011/12)

Since the refurbishment, Tate St Ives has showcased the following exhibitions:

- Rebecca Warren All That Heaven Allows, 14 October 2017 – 7 January 2018
- Virginia Woolf: An Exhibition Inspired by Her Writings, 10 February – 29 April 2018
- Patrick Heron, 19 May – 30 September 2018 (In association with Turner Contemporary)
- Rosalind Nashashibi and Lucy Skaer, Thinking through other artists 20 October 2018 – 6 January 2019
- Amie Siegel: Provenance, 20 October 2018 – 6 May 2019
- Anna Boghiguian, 19 January – 6 May 2019
- Huguette Caland, 24 May 2019 – 1 September 2019
- Otobong Nkanga 12 October 2019 – 5 January 2020
- Naum Gabo 25 January – 3 May 2020
- Haegue Yang: Strange Attractors, 24 October 2020 – 3 May 2021, later extended until 26 September 2021 due to the COVID-19 pandemic
- Petrit Halilaj, 16 October 2021 – 16 January 2022 (Note: The exhibition was originally planned for May to October 2021, but postponed due to the COVID-19 pandemic.)
- Barbara Hepworth: Art & Life, 26 November 2022 – 1 May 2023
- Casablanca Art School, 27 May 2023 – 14 January 2024
- Outi Pieski, 10 February – 6 May 2024
- Beatriz Milhazes: Maresias, 25 May – 29 September 2024
- Małgorzata Mirga-Tas, 19 October 2024 – 5 January 2025
- Liliane Lijn: Arise Alive, 24 May 2025 – 2 November 2025

== See also ==
- List of St Ives artists
- Tate Liverpool
- Tate Modern
