= Eldred Evans =

British architect (1937–2022)

Eldred Evans OBE (16 June 1937 – 6 November 2022) was a British architect. She and her partner David Shalev worked on more than 150 projects between 1964 and 2008, including Tate St Ives.

== Notable projects ==
- Newport High School, Bettws, Newport, 1972 (demolished 2009)
- Truro Crown Court, 1988
- Tate St Ives, 1993
- Quincentenary Library, Jesus College, Cambridge, 1995

== Personal life ==
Evans was born in London to artists Merlyn Evans and Phyllis Sullivan and grew up in South Africa where the family moved when she was a year old.

Evans returned to London to study architecture at the private Architectural Association and studied for a year in Yale with Norman Foster and Richard Rogers.

Evans met the Israeli architect David Shalev in 1963 and they lived and worked together from 1964. Shalev died in 2018, and was survived by their daughter Elantra Evans, who also became an architect.
