= Jamie Fobert =

British architect

Jamie Fobert CBE
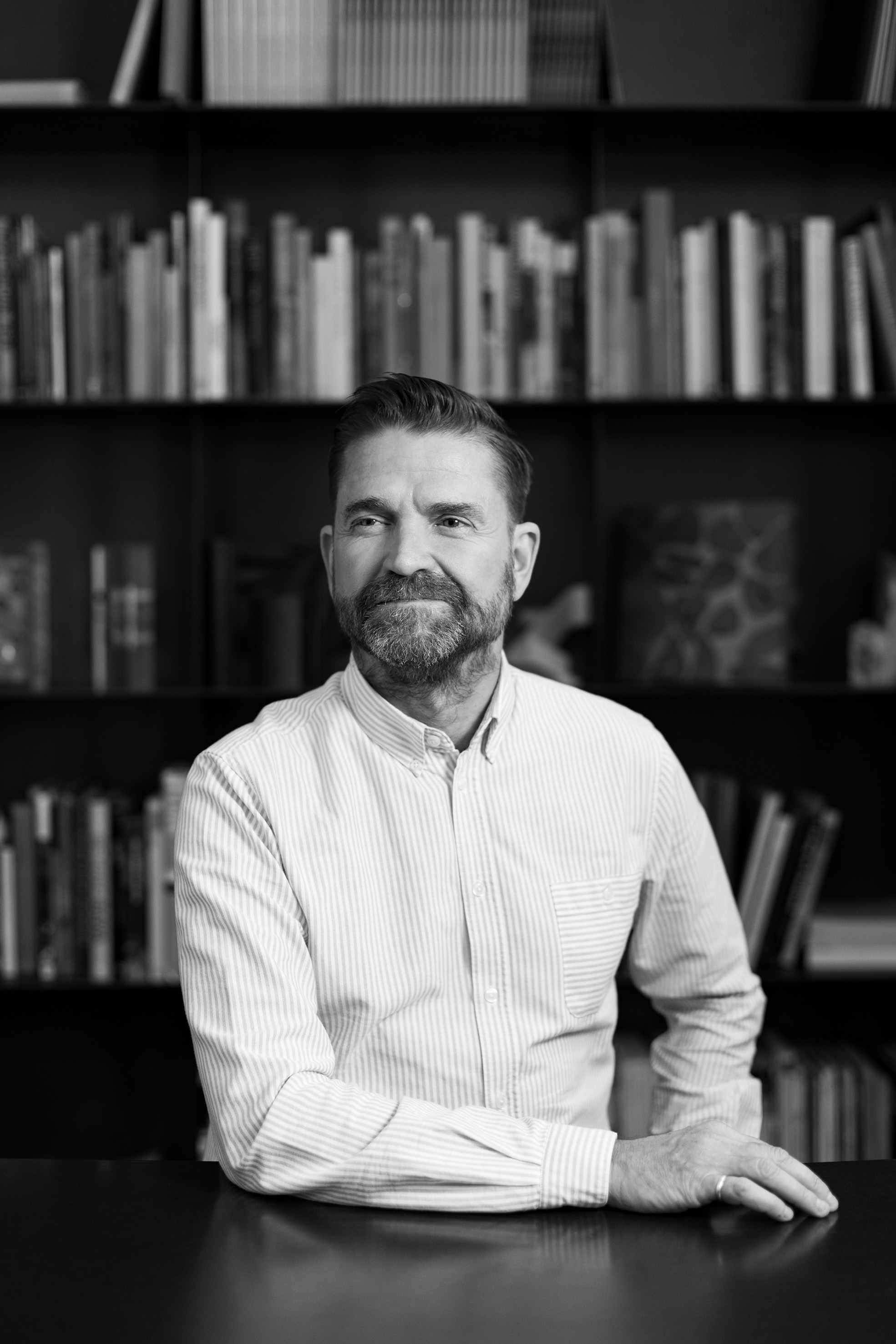
- Born: 5 November 1962 (age 63); Ontario, Canada
- Education: University of Toronto
- Occupation: Architect
- Practice: Jamie Fobert Architects
- Buildings: Extension to Tate St Ives; Extension to Kettle's Yard; Levring House; Anderson House

James Earl Fobert, CBE (born November 5, 1962) is a British architect and designer.

== Career ==
Jamie Fobert studied architecture in his native Canada, at the University of Toronto. He arrived in London in 1988 and was employed for eight years at David Chipperfield Architects. During that time, he worked on a house for Nick Knight. In 1996, he established his own practice, Jamie Fobert Architects.

Since then, his work has ranged from individual houses to retail, including Givenchy, Versace and Selfridges, and significant public buildings for the arts. His practice has won a number of public commissions for cultural organizations including Tate St Ives and Kettle's Yard and the National Portrait Gallery, London. Current projects include work for the Royal Observatory Greenwich and the Tower of London.

He is a Trustee of the Camden Arts Centre and Chair of Trustees of The Architecture Foundation. He was appointed CBE in the 2020 New Year Honours, for services to architecture.

== Awards ==
Jamie Fobert Architects has won awards including several RIBA Awards and has been twice shortlised for the RIBA Stirling Prize. In 2018, Tate St Ives was awarded the Art Fund Museum of the Year and was shortlisted for the RIBA Stirling Prize. In 2019, the practice won the BD Architect of the Year Award, in recognition of an outstanding body of work in the field of public buildings. The practice's redevelopment of the National Portrait Gallery was shortlisted for the RIBA Stirling Prize 2024 and was praised as a 'sensitive and climate-aware reconfiguration'.
