= List of British Commonwealth divisions in the Second World War =

This is a list of army divisions serving within the British Empire during the Second World War. Military formations within the British Empire were generally not static and were composed of a changing mix of units from across Britain, its colonies and the dominions. As a result military formations within the Empire and Commonwealth are not easily attributable to specific Imperial or national entities and naming conventions do not necessarily correlate with modern country names.

- "formed from" indicates that a new division was created in part from another division
- "formerly" indicates a simple division name change

== Australia ==
- 1st Australian Infantry
- 2nd Australian Infantry
- 3rd Australian Infantry
- 4th Australian Infantry
- 5th Australian Infantry
- 6th Australian Infantry
- 7th Australian Infantry
- 8th Australian Infantry
- 9th Australian Infantry
- 10th Australian Infantry
- 11th Australian Infantry
- 12th Australian Infantry "Northern Territory Force"
- 1st Australian Armoured
- 2nd Australian Armoured
- 3rd Australian Armoured

== Canada ==
- 1st Canadian Infantry
- 2nd Canadian Infantry
- 3rd Canadian Infantry
- 3rd Canadian Infantry (CAOF)
- 4th Canadian Infantry later 4th Canadian Armoured
- 5th Canadian Infantry later 5th Canadian Armoured
- 6th Canadian Infantry
- 6th Canadian Infantry (CAPF)
- 7th Canadian Infantry
- 8th Canadian Infantry
- Veterans Guard
- 4th Canadian Armoured formed from 4th Canadian Infantry
- 5th Canadian Armoured formed from 5th Canadian Infantry

== New Zealand ==
- 1st New Zealand Infantry
- 2nd New Zealand Infantry
- 3rd New Zealand Infantry
- 4th New Zealand Infantry
- 5th New Zealand Infantry

== South Africa ==
- 1st Mounted Command
- 1st South African Infantry later 6th South African Armoured
- 2nd South African Infantry
- 3rd South African Infantry
- 6th South African Armoured

== See also ==
- List of British divisions in World War II
- List of Indian divisions in World War II
- List of British Empire brigades of the Second World War
- List of British Empire corps of the Second World War
- Military history of the British Commonwealth in the Second World War
