= South African Ordnance Corps =

South African military corps

Between the two world wars, the supply and maintenance of all technical stores and equipment, including ammunition and guns, for the Union Defence Force, was the responsibility of the South African Ordnance Corps.

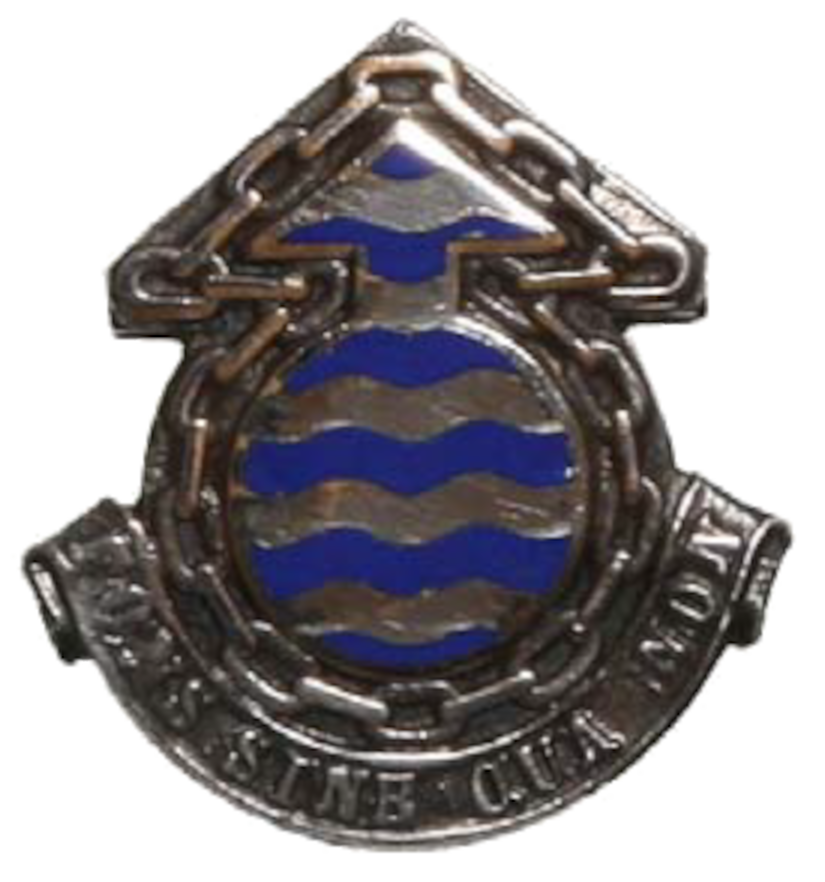
SANDF - INSIGNIA - Branch Of Service SA Army - Collar - Ordnance Service - MMD Chrome

The corps was established on 1 February 1923. It included three Permanent Force ordnance depots and three Active Citizen Force supply companies. Reorganisation was in progress when the World War II broke out. In November 1939 the SA Ordnance Corps, the SA Service Corps and the SA Administrative, Pay and Clerical Corps were replaced by the Technical Services Corps and the 'Q' Services Corps.

The 'Q' Services Corps expanded out of all recognition during the war. It was renamed 'Administrative Services Corps' in 1949, and disbanded in 1975. One of its successors is the present South African Ordnance Services Corps.

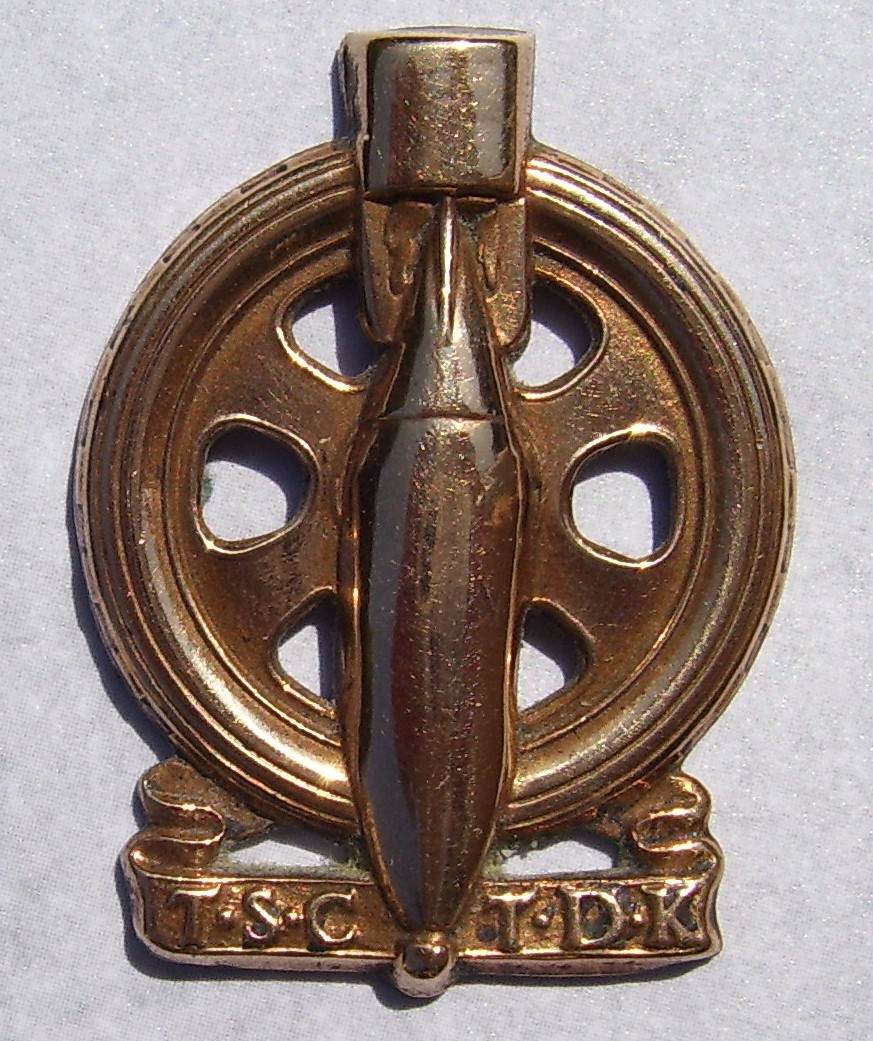
Technical Services Corps badge

The Technical Services Corps, initially referred to as 'T' Services, acquired responsibility for all technical equipment, from rifles to the heaviest weapons, and for maintenance of vehicles, tanks, guns, etc.

== Badge ==
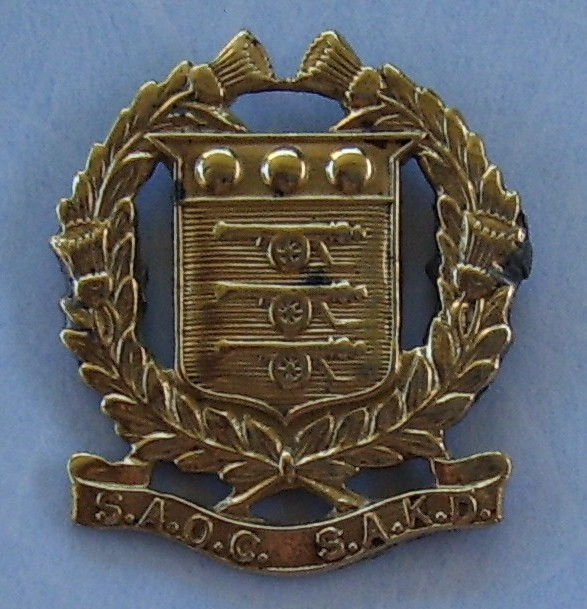
SAOC badge (1933-1949)

The badge was based on that of the British Board of Ordnance. In 1683 the Board became a Civil Department of State, under a Master General. A shield bearing three field-guns in pale, and three cannonballs in chief was adopted as the Seal of the Board.

From 1923 to 1933, the SAOC badge was the Board of Ordnance shield above a scroll bearing the initials S.A.O.C. and S.A.K.D. (Suid-Afrikaanse Krygsbehoeftediens). From 1933 onwards, the shield was surrounded by a wreath of protea flowers and leaves.

The Board of Ordnance shield was later incorporated into that of the Administrative Service Corps which in turn resembled that of the Royal Logistic Corps.

== See also ==
- South African Army corps and branches
