= Q Services Corps (South Africa) =

South african war force

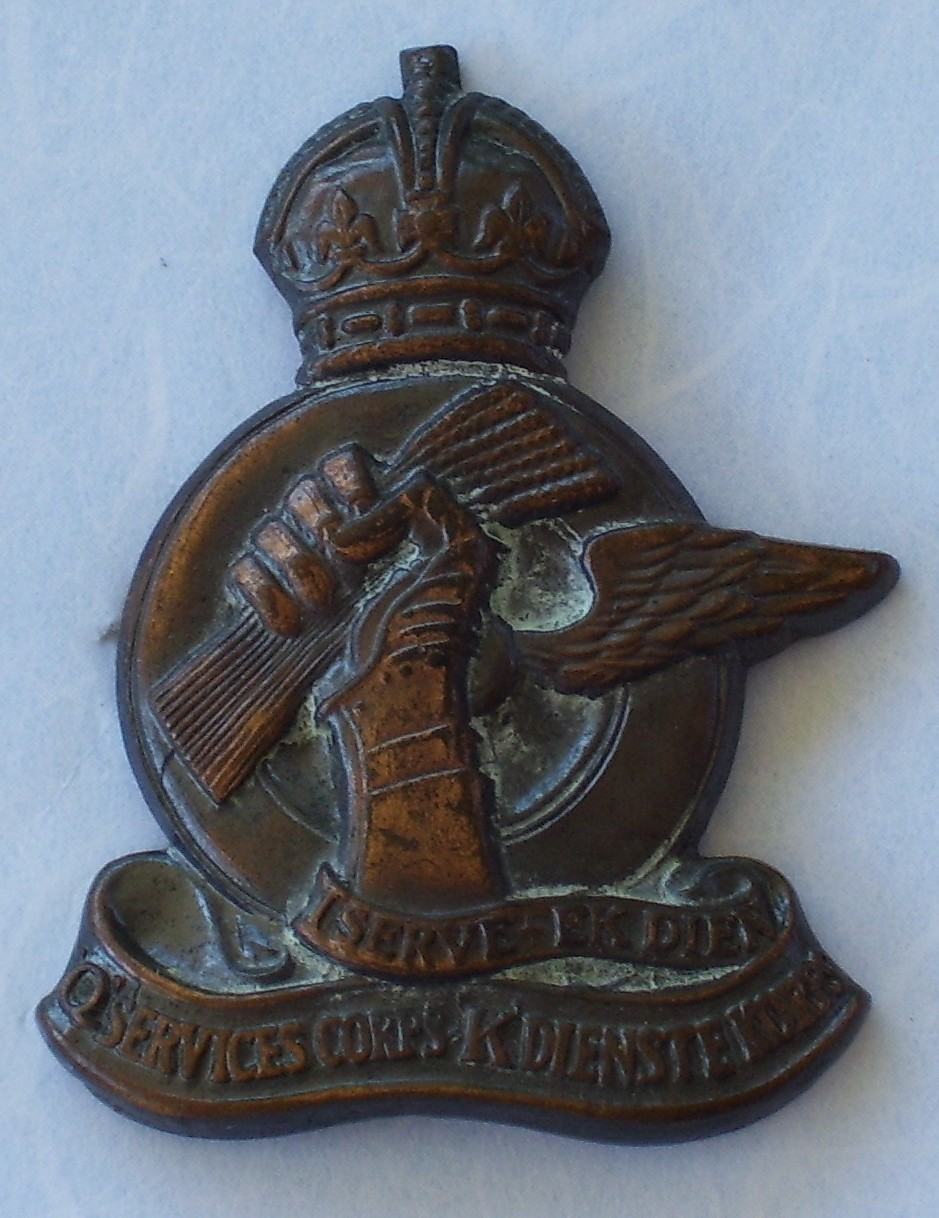
'Q' Services Corps cap badge.

The establishment of the 'Q' Services Corps as part of the South African Permanent Force was promulgated in the Government Gazette dated 10 November 1939.

== Formation ==
The South African Service Corps, which was developed during the First World War, the South African Ordnance Corps and the South African Administrative, Pay and Clerical Corps were replaced by the 'Q' Services Corps and the 'T' (Technical) Services Corps in terms of Proclamation 276 of 10 November 1939.

The 'Q' Services were vastly expanded during the Second World War, providing numerous services for the combatant forces, including the provision of petroleum, oil and lubricants (POL), rations, ammunition, stationery, clothing and equipment and other supplies, as well as providing transport through a large number of motor transport (MT) companies. Duties also involved the running of numerous establishments such as field bakeries and butcheries.

By April 1941, 'Q' Services had already deployed more than 7,000 men for the East African Campaign alone.

After the war, pay was also handled by the Corps.

The 'Q' Services Corps was replaced by the Administrative Services Corps (ASC) in November 1949. The ASC was responsible for supply and transport services other than armament and technical stores.

== Insignia ==

Helmet flashes were worn by the Union Defence Forces from the early 1900s until the early 1940s. The flash was worn on both sides of the Wolseley helmet and on the upturned left brim of the smasher hat. As helmets and smasher hats were superseded by berets during the Second World War, the system therefore lasted for only about twenty years, though some flashes were later adapted for wearing on berets.

The standard pattern flash, introduced in 1923, was rectangular, 75mm high and 50mm wide. Flashes of Permanent Force (PF) units displayed the branch colours, while those of Citizen Force (CF) units displayed a provincial colour at the top, the branch colour at the bottom, and unit colours in the centre.

The flash for the 'Q' Services Corps was red, white and blue as shown alongside.
