= South African Army Signal Formation =

South African Army Signals Formation
- SANDF Signals Formation emblem
- Active: 1923 to date
- Country: South Africa
- Allegiance: South African Army
- Branch: South African Army
- Type: Military Communications
- Part of: South African Army
- Colors: Spectrum Green, Pompadour Blue and Royal Blue
- Mascots: Flying mercury, the Messenger of the Gods

Insignia
- Collar Badge: Mercury
- Beret Colour: Khaki
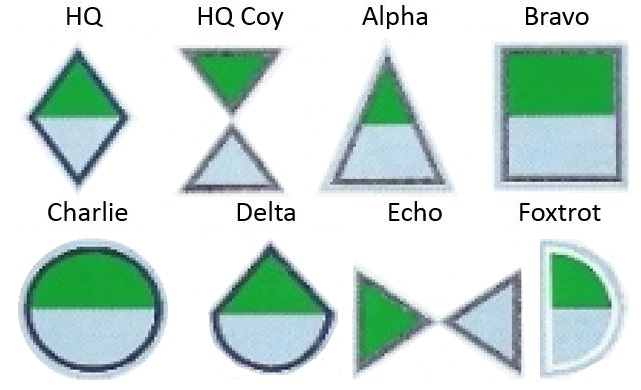
- Signals Company Emblems

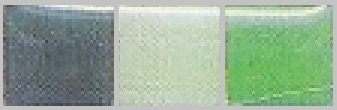
- Signals Beret Bar circa 1992

The South African Army Signal Formation is a formation/corps of the South African Army.

== History ==
An image of Pieter bezuidenhout, an Officer of the South African Corps of Signals

The South African Corps of Signals was formed 1923.

In 1940, the Signals Branch of the South African Army College moved from the college to Potchefstroom where it became the Signals Training Centre, this name being changed to School of Signals in 1944. The School of Signals again became a branch of the college in 1946 and, in January 1947, it was once more moved to Potchefstroom, where it became a branch of the School of Artillery and Armour.

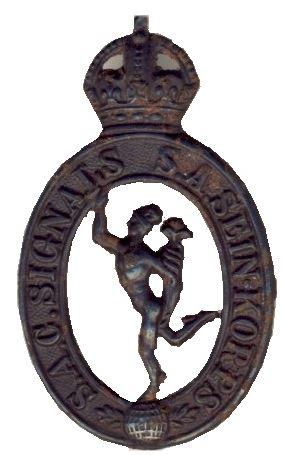
South African Union Defence Force era Signals Corps Badge

SACS units included:

  - 71 Signal Unit (South Africa) (2 Squadron, 1 Armoured Division Signal Regiment, S.A.C.S. from 1 Jan 56 to 31 Jan 1959)
  - 72 Signal Unit SACS
  - 73 Signal Unit SACS
  - 3 Electronic Workshop SACS
  - 1 Signal Regiment SACS

In April 1978 the Minister of Defence, Mr P.W. Botha, authorised the forming of 44 Signal Squadron SACS to support 44 Parachute Brigade. During the time of 24 September 1980 until October 1986, it supported the Brigade in all aspects of signals; e.g., the supply of communication and the manning of a Communication Centrum (Comcen). On 2 October 1986 44 Signal Unit was formed with Commandant Lombard as commander, and his task was to supply 44 Brigade with communication and to establish a full-strength signal unit. His second in command was Maj P. Drotsky and the RSM P. Snyders.

In the late 1990s, the SA Department of Defence decided to group various environments together, elements, which it felt belonged together such as the environments of telecommunication, information technology (IT), registries, documentation services, libraries and electronic warfare, in other words, all forms of communication. This led to the establishment of the joint-service Command and Management Information Systems Division (CMIS Division) on 1 April 1999, its task being to deliver communications and info systems for the entire SANDF. The Corps of Signals left the command of the South African Army and was totally incorporated (personnel and all equipment) into the CMIS Division. On 28 March 2008, certain elements of CMIS Division migrated back to the various services. The South African Corps of Signals returned to the command of the South African Army as from 1 April 2008, to be known as the South African Army Signal Formation.

== Structure of formation ==
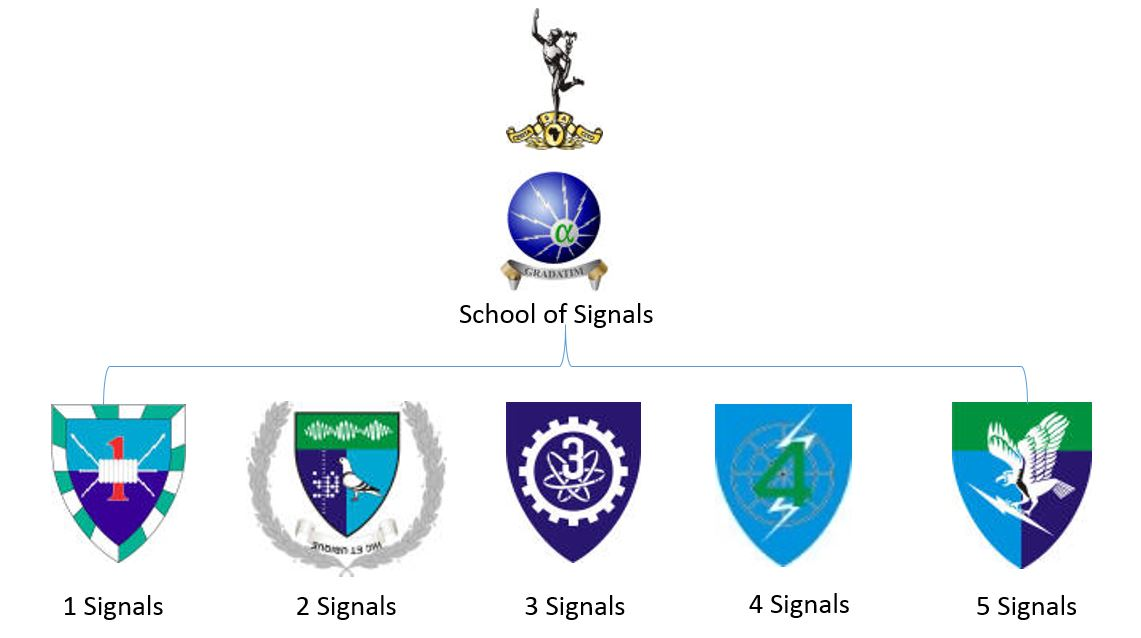
