= HMS TB 5 =

Two ships of the British Royal Navy were named HMS TB 5.

- HMS TB 5 (1879) - a first-class, Lightning-type, torpedo boat, built by John I. Thornycroft & Company and launched in 1879. Sold 1897.
- HMS TB 5 (1906) - a Cricket-class destroyer built by J. Samuel White, originally named Spider but renamed during construction. Launched on 5 December 1906. Sold for scrap October 1920.
