= HMS TB 81 =

Two torpedo boats of the British Royal Navy were named HMS TB 81.

- HMS TB 81 (1882) - a second-class torpedo boat of the TB 76-class, which was built by John I. Thornycroft & Company and launched on 5 October 1882. Sold 1902.
- HMS TB 81 (1885) - a first-class torpedo boat built as a private venture by J. Samuel White with the name Swift, purchased by Royal Navy in 1885 and renamed TB 81. Sold for scrap 1921.
