= HMS TB 12 =

History

United Kingdom
- Name: HMS TB 12
- Builder: Yarrow, Poplar
- Laid down: 23 November 1905
- Launched: 15 March 1907
- Completed: July 1907
- Fate: Mined 10 June 1915

General characteristics
- Class & type: Cricket-class destroyer
- Displacement: 291 long tons (296 t)
- Length: 175 ft 9 in (53.57 m) oa
- Beam: 18 ft 0 in (5.49 m)
- Draught: 5 ft 8 in (1.73 m)
- Installed power: 4,000 shp (3,000 kW)
- Propulsion: 2× Yarrow boilers; Parsons steam turbines; 3 shafts
- Speed: 26 kn (30 mph; 48 km/h)
- Complement: 39
- Armament: 2 × 12-pounder (76 mm) guns; 3 × 18 inch (450 mm) torpedo tubes

HMS TB 12 (originally named HMS Moth) was a Cricket-class coastal destroyer or torpedo-boat of the British Royal Navy. TB 12 was built by the shipbuilder Yarrow from 1905 to 1907. She was used for local patrol duties in the First World War and was sunk by a German mine in the North Sea on 10 June 1915.

== Design ==
The Cricket-class was intended as a smaller and cheaper supplement to the large, fast but expensive Tribal-class, particularly in coastal waters such as the English Channel. An initial order for twelve ships was placed by the Admiralty in May 1905 as part of the 1905–1906 shipbuilding programme, with five ships each ordered from Thornycroft and J. Samuel White and two from Yarrow .

Yarrow's ships (the different shipbuilders built to their own design, although standardised machinery and armament was fitted) were 175 feet 9 inches (53.57 m) long overall and 172 feet 0 inches (52.43 m) between perpendiculars, with a beam of 18 feet 0 inches (5.49 m) and a draught of 5 feet 8 inches (1.73 m). The ships had turtleback (Note: A fore deck with exaggerated camber designed to throw off sea water at high speeds.) forecastles and two funnels. Two oil-fuelled Yarrow water-tube boilers fed steam to three-stage Parsons steam turbines, driving three propeller shafts. The machinery was designed to give 4,000 shaft horsepower (3,000 kW), with a speed of 26 knots (30 mph; 48 km/h) specified.

Armament consisted of two 12-pounder (76-mm) 12 cwt guns (Note: 12 cwt refers to the weight of the gun in hundredweights) and three 18-inch (450 mm) torpedo tubes (in three single mounts). The ships had a crew of 39.

== Service ==
Both of Yarrow's two torpedo-boats of the 1905–1906 programme, Mayfly and Moth were laid down at their Poplar, London shipyard on 23 November 1905. In 1906, the ships of the class, including Moth, were redesignated as torpedo-boats, losing their names in the process, with Moth becoming TB 12. She was launched on 15 March 1907 and was completed in July 1907.

In early 1911 TB 12, previously employed at the Dartmouth Naval College, joined the Nore Flotilla. She was refitted at Sheerness in 1911.

On 9 June 1915, following the sinking by a German submarine (probably U-10) of six fishing smacks, the Nore Local Defence Flotilla launched a large search for the submarine involved, with five destroyers and six torpedo-boats, including TB 12, taking part. At 03:30 on 10 June TB 12 was about 2 miles north east of the Sunk Light Vessel when an explosion wrecked the fore part of the ship. Her sister ship TB 10 took TB 12 in tow, but shortly afterwards an explosion wrecked TB 10 which broke in two and quickly sank. Attempts to save TB 12 failed and she sank at 10:55. Although it was believed at the time that the ships had been torpedoed, with the destroyer Vulture reporting that she had seen a torpedo heading towards TB 10 and that Vulture herself had been near-missed by another torpedo, the two torpedo-boats had actually been sunk by mines. 23 of TB 12's crew were killed.
