= HMS Wizard =

Six ships of the Royal Navy have been named HMS Wizard.

- HMS Wizard (1805) was a brig-sloop launched 1805 and sold October 1816.
- HMS Wizard (1830) was a Cherokee-class brig-sloop launched in May 1830 and wrecked 1859.
- HMS Wizard (1860) was a Britomart-class gunboat launched in August 1860 and scrapped 1879.
- HMS Wizard (1889) was a Sharpshooter-class torpedo gunboat launched in August 1889 and renamed HMS Karakatta in April 1890.
- HMS Wizard (1895) was a Conflict-class destroyer launched in February 1895 and sold in 1920.
- HMS Wizard (R72) was a W-class destroyer launched in September 1943. Later converted to a Type 15 frigate and scrapped in 1967
