= HMS TB 4 (1906) =

History

United Kingdom
- Name: HMS TB 4
- Builder: J. Samuel White, Cowes
- Laid down: 18 September 1905
- Launched: 30 October 1906
- Completed: April 1907
- Commissioned: 17 April 1907
- Fate: Ran aground 11 January 1921 and scrapped

General characteristics
- Class & type: Cricket-class coastal destroyer
- Displacement: 268 long tons (272 t)
- Length: 171 ft 6 in (52.27 m) oa
- Beam: 17 ft 6 in (5.33 m)
- Draught: 6 ft 4 1/2 in (1.943 m)
- Installed power: 3,750 shp (2,800 kW)
- Propulsion: 2 × Yarrow boilers; Parsons steam turbines; 3 shafts
- Speed: 26 knots (48 km/h; 30 mph)
- Complement: 39
- Armament: 2 × 12-pounder (76 mm) guns; 3 × 18-inch (450 mm) torpedo tubes

HMS TB 4 (Note: Torpedo Boat No. 4) (originally named HMS Sandfly) was a Cricket-class coastal destroyer or torpedo-boat of the British Royal Navy. TB 4 was built by the shipbuilder J S White from 1905 to 1907. She served in the Dover Patrol in the First World War and survived the war. She ran aground on the way to be scrapped on 11 January 1921 and was broken up in situ.

== Design ==
The Cricket class, known as Coastal Destroyers, was intended as a smaller and cheaper supplement to the large, fast, but expensive Tribal class, particularly in coastal waters such as the English Channel. An initial order for twelve ships was placed by the Admiralty in May 1905 as part of the 1905–1906 shipbuilding programme, with five ships each ordered from Thornycroft and J. Samuel White and two from Yarrow.

White's ships (the different shipbuilders built to their own design, although standardised machinery and armament was fitted) were 178 feet 0 inches (54.25 m) long overall and 175 feet 0 inches (53.34 m) between perpendiculars, with a beam of 17 feet 6 inches (5.33 m) and a draught of 6 feet 1 1/2 inches (1.867 m). Displacement was 247 long tons (251 t) normal and 272 long tons (276 t) deep load. The ships had turtleback (Note: A fore deck with exaggerated camber designed to throw off sea water at high speeds.) forecastles and two funnels. Two oil-fuelled Yarrow water-tube boilers fed steam to three-stage Parsons steam turbines, driving three propeller shafts. The machinery was designed to give 3,600 shaft horsepower (2,700 kW), with a speed of 26 knots (48 km/h; 30 mph) specified.

Armament consisted of two 12-pounder (76 mm) 12 cwt guns (Note: 12 cwt refers to the weight of the gun in hundredweights), and three 18-inch (450 mm) torpedo tubes (in three single mounts). The ships had a crew of 39.

== Service ==
The fourth of the coastal destroyers ordered from Whites under the 1905–1906 programme was laid down at J. Samuel White's Cowes shipyard on 18 September 1905, and was launched as HMS Sandfly on 30 October 1906. In December 1906, it was announced by the British Admiralty that the coastal destroyers would be reclassified as torpedo boats, and would be known by numbers rather than names. Sandfly was therefore renamed TB 4. TB 4 was completed in April 1907.

The newly completed TB 4 was accepted from Whites and commissioned with a nucleus crew (Note: Ships with nucleus crews were permanently manned with two-fifths of the ships' normal complement, consisting of key officers and men (including engineering and gunnery specialists), who would become well acquainted with their ships. The ships could be quickly mobilised by regular Navy personnel drawn from shore barracks and training establishments. This mobilisation was frequently practiced.) as a tender to the depot ship Hecla at Portsmouth naval base on 17 April 1907. On 24 October 1907, as part of the Portsmouth Flotilla, TB 4, together with the destroyers Teviot, Rocket, Shark and Vigilant, carried out a cruise in the vicinity of Portsmouth. Following the loss of the destroyer Blackwater, which was sunk in a collision in the English Channel on 6 April 1909, TB 4 and TB 20 supported the salvage operations. In March 1912, TB 4's crew was used to carry out final sea trials on the destroyer Tigress, with TB 4 to recommission into the 4th Destroyer Flotilla on completion of these trials.

In 1912, four Patrol Flotillas were formed with torpedo boats and older destroyers, with the duties of preventing enemy minelaying or torpedo attacks on the east coast of Britain. In February 1913, TB 4 was a member of the Eighth Flotilla, based at Chatham, but by January 1914, had transferred to the Seventh Flotilla, based at Devonport.

The Royal Navy mobilised on the eve of the outbreak of the First World War in August 1914, with TB 4 still part of the Seventh Flotilla as the flotilla moved to its war station on the east coast of England. In January 1915, TB 4 was listed as part of the 9th Flotilla, but by March had transferred to the 6th Destroyer Flotilla, part of the Dover Patrol.

On 17 November 1915, the hospital ship Anglia, carrying a load of sick and wounded soldiers back to Britain from France, struck a mine off Folkestone. Anglia took on a heavy list, but her engines were not shut down, so she continued to make significant way through the water, making rescue efforts more difficult. TB 4, under the command of Lieutenant-Commander H. P. Boxer, twice went alongside Anglia to rescue survivors and then picked up two boat loads of wounded from the sea, with TB 4 rescuing about 140 men in total, before taking them to Dover. Other survivors were rescued by the torpedo gunboat Hazard, the steamships Langdon and Channel Queen, and the collier Lusitania, which also struck a mine and sank. A total of 168 lives were lost from Anglia, including 133 patients.

On the night of March 17/18 1917 Germany launched a major raid by torpedo boats based in Flanders against Allied defences and shipping in the English Channel. While two groups of torpedo boats were to operate against the Dover Barrage, four more were ordered to attack shipping on the Downs. The attack on the Dover Barrage sank the British destroyer Paragon and badly damaged the destroyer Llewellyn. while the attack on the Downs sank the steamer SS Greypoint and damaged the naval drifter Redwald before firing a few shells at Ramsgate, Broadstairs and St Peter's. TB 4, patrolling in support of the line of drifters guarding the Downs, spotted the German torpedo boats as they shelled targets on land, reported the sighting and attempted to pursue the German ships, which soon managed to outpace TB 4 which lost sight of the German torpedo boats. On the night of 26/27 April 1917, German torpedo boats launched another attack against the coast of Kent, shelling Margate, Ramsgate and Broadstairs, being engaged by the monitor Marshal Ney, guardship for the Downs and a coast defence battery at North Foreland. TB 4 also spotted the German force, and after reporting it, attempted to get in position to deliver a torpedo attack, but the German force broke off the bombardment before any attack could be made.

TB 4 remained part of the 6th Flotilla at the end of the war on 11 November 1918. By March 1919, TB 4 was in reserve at Devonport, and by January 1920, was, together with most of the remaining torpedo boats, listed as being for sale. She was sold for scrap to the shipbreakers Thos. W. Ward on 7 October 1920, but ran aground near Westward Ho! on the way to the scrapyard on 11 January 1921 and was broken up in situ.
