= HMS Conflict (1894) =

Conflict-class destroyer

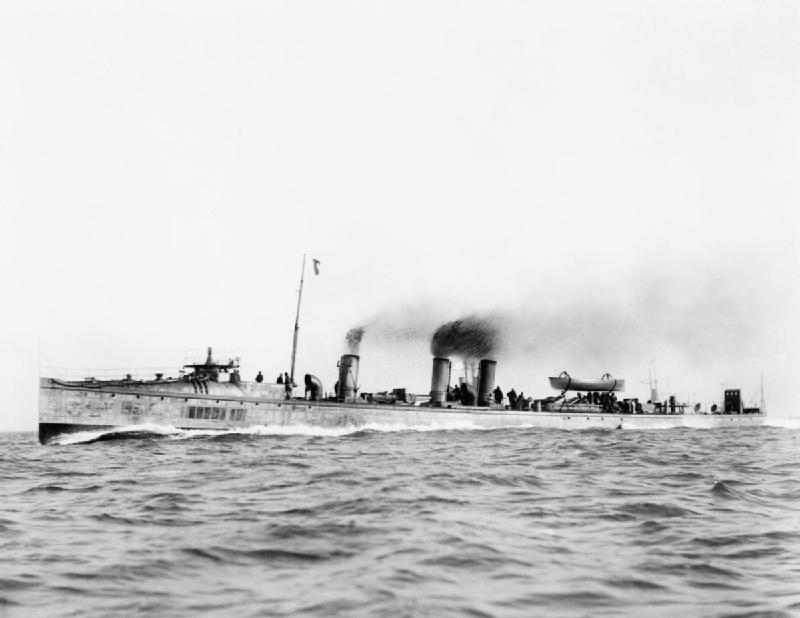
- HMS Conflict

History

United Kingdom
- Name: HMS Conflict
- Builder: J. Samuel White, East Cowes, Isle of Wight
- Launched: 13 December 1894
- Fate: Sold, 20 May 1920

General characteristics
- Class & type: Conflict-class destroyer
- Displacement: 320 long tons (325 t)
- Length: 200 ft (61 m)
- Propulsion: White-Forster boilers, 4,500 hp (3,356 kW)
- Speed: 27 knots (50 km/h; 31 mph)
- Complement: 53 officers and men
- Armament: 1 × QF 12 pounder 12 cwt naval gun; 2 × torpedo tubes

HMS Conflict was the lead ship of the Conflict-class destroyers built by J. Samuel White, at East Cowes, Isle of Wight for the Royal Navy. She was launched on 13 December 1894, and entered service in 1899. After an initial spell in the Mediterranean Fleet, Conflict returned to British waters, where she served the rest of her career. Conflict was part of the Portsmouth Local Defence Flotilla during the First World War, which she survived. Conflict was sold for scrap on 20 May 1920.

== Construction and design ==
On 7 November 1893, the British Admiralty placed an order for three "27-knotter" torpedo boat destroyers (Conflict, Teazer and Wizard) with the shipbuilder J. Samuel White under the 1893–1894 shipbuilding programme for the Royal Navy, with delivery of the three ships to be completed by April 1895. In total, the 1893–1894 programme ordered 36 destroyers from 14 shipbuilders as a follow-on to the six prototype "26-knotter" destroyers ordered under the 1892–1893 programme.

The Admiralty did not specify a standard design for destroyers, laying down broad requirements, including a trial speed of 27 knots (31 mph; 50 km/h), a "turtleback" (Note: A fore deck with exaggerated camber designed to throw off sea water at high speeds.) forecastle and specified armament, which was to vary depending on whether the ship was to be used in the torpedo boat or gunboat role. As a torpedo boat, the planned armament was a single QF 12 pounder 12 cwt (3 in (76 mm) calibre) gun on a platform on the ship's conning tower (in practice the platform was also used as the ship's bridge), together with a secondary gun armament of three 6-pounder guns, and two 18 inch (450 mm) torpedo tubes. As a gunboat, one of the torpedo tubes could be removed to accommodate a further two six-pounders.

The three White-built destroyers were 205 ft 6 in (62.64 m) long overall and 200 ft 0 in (60.96 m) between perpendiculars, with a beam of 20 ft 0 11/16 in (6.11 m) and a draught of 8 ft 3 in (2.51 m). Displacement was 320 long tons (330 t) light and 360 long tons (370 t) full load. Three Water-tube boilers of White's own design fed steam to 2 four-cylinder triple-expansion steam engines, rated at 4,500 ihp (3,400 kW). Three funnels were fitted.

Conflict was laid down at White's Cowes, Isle of Wight shipyard on 3 January 1894 as Yard number 945 and was launched on 13 December 1894. The three Wight-built destroyers had difficulty meeting their required contract speed of 27 knots, although Conflict was eventually recorded as having reached 27.21 kn (31.31 mph; 50.39 km/h) during sea trials, and Conflict was not accepted into service until July 1899.

== Service history ==
After her commission she was in April 1900 sent to the Mediterranean station, serving as a tender to Victorious, and was ordered to return home in early 1902, but took part in gunnery and tactical exercises near Arucas, Las Palmas, in April that year before returning. She arrived at Plymouth on 5 July 1902, and was paid off at Portsmouth on 24 July.

In early 1910, Conflict was a member of the 6th Destroyer Flotilla, based at The Nore, and underwent refit at Chatham Dockyard. On 30 August 1912 the Admiralty directed all destroyers were to be grouped into classes designated by letters based on contract speed and appearance. After 30 September 1913, as a 27-knotter, Conflict was assigned to the A class.

In March 1913, Conflict was based at Portsmouth as a tender to the torpedo school HMS Vernon, and listed as in-commission, with a nucleus crew. Conflict remained attached to HMS Vernon in July 1914, although now was listed as being in reserve.

=== First World War ===
By 1 November 1914, Conflict was still based at Portsmouth, one of six old destroyers, 17 torpedo boats and four submarines that made up the Local Defence Flotilla for the port. On 24 November 1914, following an attack by the German submarine SM U-21 on the steamer SS Malachite the previous day, Conflict and the torpedo boat TB 9 escorted a transport from Southampton to Le Havre. On 4 June 1917, the torpedo boat TB 98 spotted the conning tower and periscope of a submarine off Portsmouth, and made to attack the submarine, which promptly dived. TB 98 dropped two depth charges at the submarine, and when, about an hour later, the torpedo boat sighted a periscope, TB 98 attempted to ram the submarine. Conflict, which was following close behind TB 98, dropped two depth charges. The attacks by TB 98 and Conflict were judged by Naval Intelligence to be "improbable" to have been successful, although the commanding officers of the two ships were mentioned in dispatches.

Conflict was remained part of the Portsmouth Local Defence Flotilla in August 1918, but by December that year, while still part of the flotilla, was listed as being paid off.

== Disposal ==
By January 1920, Conflict was listed as for sale, and the ship was sold on 20 May 1920 to Ward for scrapping at their Milford Haven yard.

== Pennant numbers ==
Pennant number	From	To
P24	1914	September 1915
D96	September 1915	April 1917
D18	January 1918	-
