= HMS Spider =

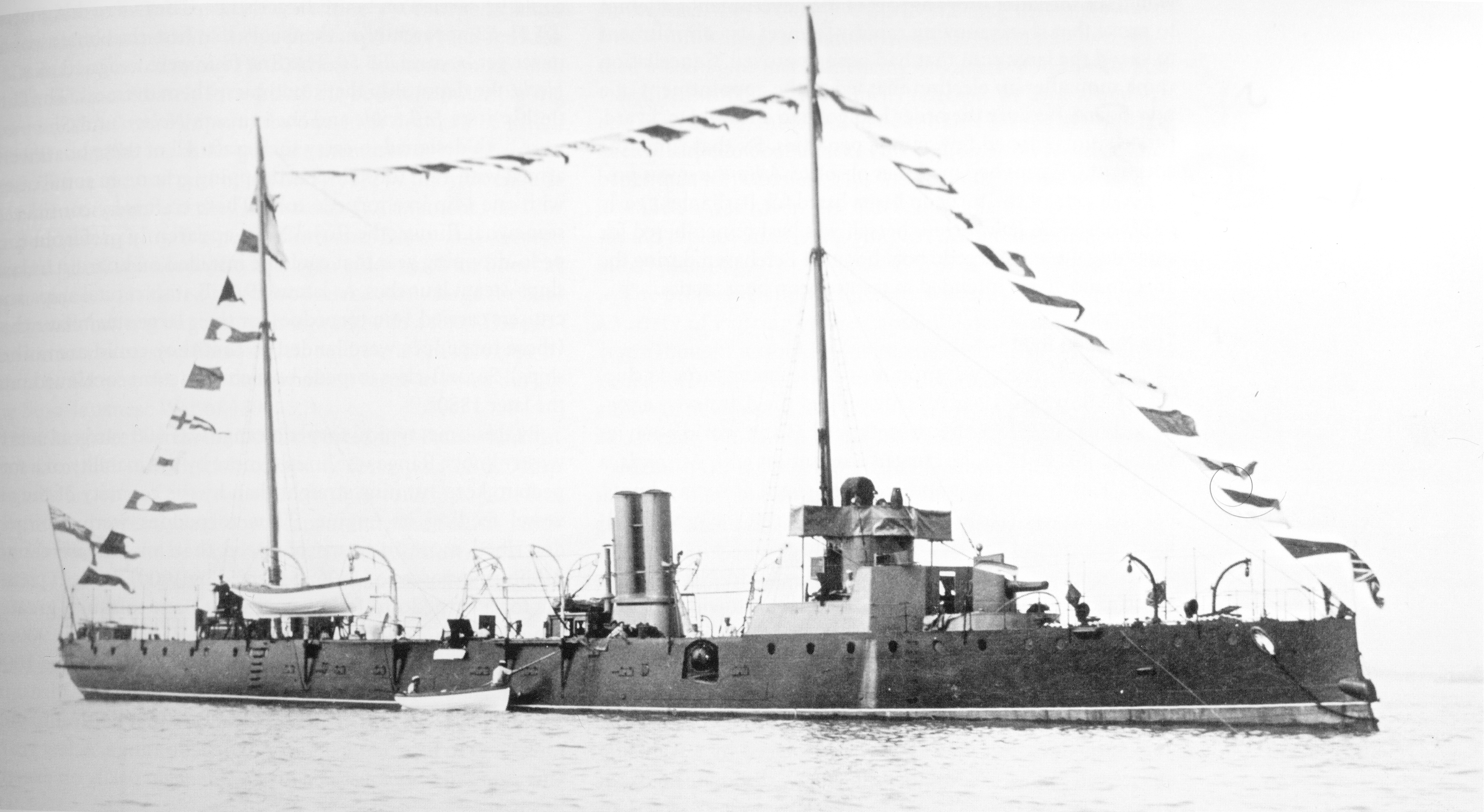
HMS Spider (1887), an early model of torpedo gunboat.

Spider has been the name of a number of vessels of the British Royal Navy;

- HMS Spider (1782), formerly the privateer Victoire built at Dunkirk earlier that year, that the Royal Navy captured in 1782, took into service, and sold at Malta in 1806.
- HMS Spider (1806), formerly Vigilante, a Spanish brig-rigged sloop captured on 4 April 1806 by HMS Renommee, and that served in the Royal Navy for the remainder of the Napoleonic Wars. She was broken up in 1815 at Antigua.
- HMS Spider (1835), a six-gun schooner built at Chatham in 1835 to a design by Sir Robert Seppings, which served in South America before becoming an engine fitters' vessel at Plymouth in 1855. Dimensions: Length Overall: 80' 2" x Breadth: 23' 3" x Depth: 9' 10"
- HMS Spider (1856), a wooden gunboat built on the Tyne by T W Smith in 1856, which later served in South America and South Africa. Dimensions: Length Overall: 106' x Breadth: 22' x Depth: 8'
- HMS Spider (1887), a steel, twin-screw torpedo gunboat built at Devonport in 1887. Of 525 tons displacement, she was armed with one 4" gun and six 3-pounder Quick-firing guns. She had two fixed torpedo tubes and two launching cradles.
- HMS Spider, a coastal destroyer renamed TB 5 in 1906.
- Spider, a stern-wheeled gunboat launched by Thornycroft in 1909 that in 1912 served the South Nigerian government.
- Spider, formerly the wooden fishing boat Francisco Antonio Quarto, purchased at Gibraltar in 1941 and used as a degaussing vessel.

== See also ==
At least two hired armed vessels also bore the name Spider:

- Hired armed lugger Spider
- Hired armed cutter Spider
