= TB 114-class torpedo boat =

Type of the British torpedo boat

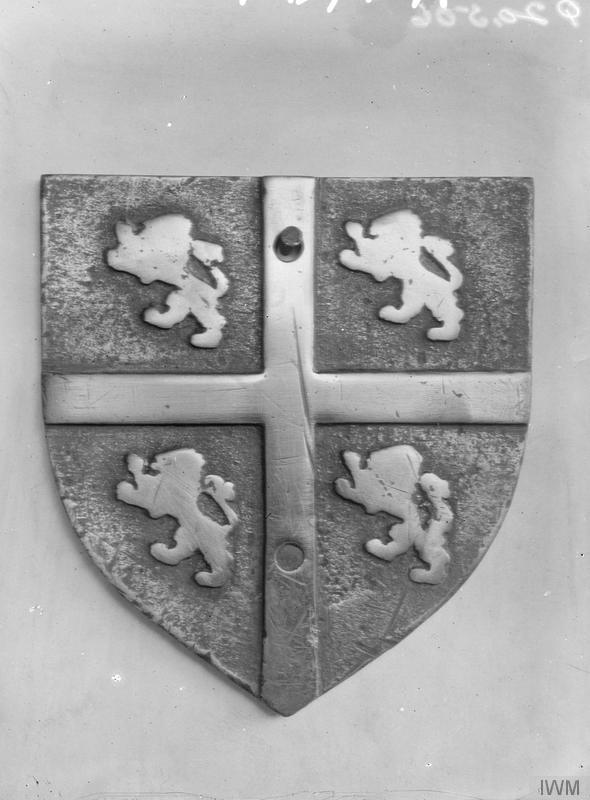
- Ship's badge of HMS Torpedo Boat 114

Class overview
- Name: TB 114-class torpedo boat
- Builders: J S White, Cowes
- Operators: Royal Navy
- Preceded by: TB 109 class
- Succeeded by: Cricket class
- Completed: 4
- Lost: 1
- Retired: 3

General characteristics
- Displacement: 205 long tons (208 t) deep load
- Length: 165 ft 0 in (50.29 m) pp
- Beam: 17 ft 6 in (5.33 m)
- Draught: 7 ft 0 in (2.13 m)
- Installed power: 2,900 ihp (2,200 kW)
- Propulsion: 1 × triple-expansion steam engine
- Speed: 25 knots (46 km/h; 29 mph)
- Armament: 3× 3-pounder (47 mm) guns; 3 × 18-inch (450 mm) torpedo tubes

The TB 114 class was a class of four 160-foot torpedo boats built for the British Royal Navy in 1903–1905 by the shipbuilder J. Samuel White. All four ships served in local defence flotillas during the First World War, with one of the ships being sunk in 1918. The remaining three ships were withdrawn from use after the end of the war, with the last of the class sold for scrap in 1921.

== Construction and design ==
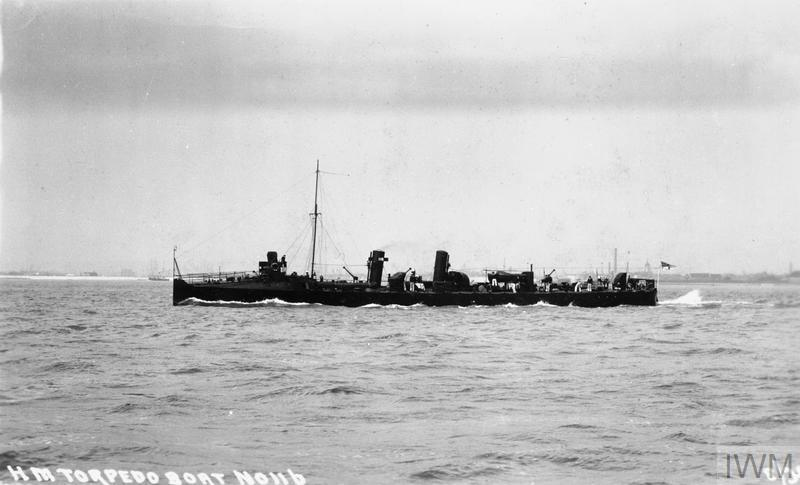
HM Torpedo Boat No. 116, photograph by Ernest Hopkins of Southsea

In the 1902–1903 shipbuilding programme, the British Admiralty placed an order with the shipbuilder J. Samuel White for four '160-foot' torpedo boats, as a follow-on to four '160-foot' torpedo boats ordered from the rival shipyard Thornycroft under the 1899–1900 and 1900–1901 shipbuilding programmes (the TB 98 class) and five more ships of similar design ordered from Thornycroft under the 1901–1902 shipbuilding programme (the TB 109 class). These '160-foot' torpedo boats allowed the replacement of worn out older torpedo boats. (Note: Over 50 torpedo boats, most 125-foot boats, were ordered as a result of the 1885 war-scare with Russia.) The 1902–1903 torpedo boats (the TB 114 class) were the last '160-foot' torpedo boats built for the Royal Navy. Torpedo-boat construction did not resume until the 1905–1906 programme, when orders were placed for twelve of a new class of "Coastal destroyers" which were subsequently re-classed as torpedo boats. These twelve (and a further twenty-four which followed them) were of similar size to the '160-foot' boats, but were turbine-powered, with the lighter machinery allowing a heavier armament to be carried.

The 1902–1903 torpedo boats were slightly larger than those built by Thornycroft, but were still of basically similar design. They were actually 165 feet 0 inches (50.29 m) long between perpendiculars, with a beam of 17 feet 6 inches (5.33 m) and a draught of 7 feet 0 inches (2.13 m). Displacement was 205 long tons (208 t) deep load. A triple expansion steam engine rated at 2,900 indicated horsepower (2,200 kW) drove a single propeller shaft, giving a speed of 25 knots (46 km/h; 29 mph). The ship had a turtleback (Note: A fore deck with exaggerated camber designed to throw off sea water at high speeds.) forecastle and had two funnels.

The ships were fitted with three 18-inch (450 mm) torpedo tubes. Two single tubes were mounted on the beam of the ship, just aft of the forecastle, where they could fire nearly directly ahead, with the third tube on the ship's centreline further aft. Three 3-pounder (47 mm) guns, two forward and one aft, completed the ship's armament.

== Service ==
In November 1911, TB 115 was a tender to the torpedo school HMS Actaeon. Three of the ships (TB 114, TB 115 and TB 117) were part of The Nore torpedo boat flotilla and manned with nucleus crews in February 1913, with TB 116 part of the Portsmouth Flotilla. TB 114, the senior officer's boat of the Nore flotilla, collided with TB 18 on 1 April 1913, with TB 114 being badly holed and under repair at HMNB Chatham for 14 days following the accident.

The four ships remained part of the Nore and Portsmouth flotillas in July 1914, on the eve of the outbreak of the First World War. During the First World War they served with local defence flotillas at the Nore and Portsmouth, being limited to local defence duties owing to their small size and limited endurance. On 13 October 1914 TB 116, part of the Portsmouth defence flotilla, spotted the German submarine U-20 off Culver Cliff on the east coast of the Isle of Wight. TB 116 opened fire on the submarine and attempted to ram, but the submarine dived to safety. TB 117 was sunk in a collision with a merchant ship, the SS Kamouraska, in the English Channel on 10 June 1917. The three remaining ships of the class remained in service with local defence flotillas in December 1918, but by January 1919, only TB 116 was in service, as a tender at Portsmouth. TB 114 and TB 115 were sold for scrap in 1919, with TB 116, which had been used for cadet training, being sold in 1921.

== Ships ==
Number	Builder	Launched	Notes
TB 114	J Samuel White	8 June 1903	Sold for scrap 1919
TB 115	J Samuel White	19 November 1903	Sold for scrap 1919
TB 116	J Samuel White	21 December 1903	Sold for scrap 22 October 1921
TB 117	J Samuel White	18 February 1904	Sunk following collision with merchant vessel Kamourska in English Channel 10 June 1917; 3 killed

== See also ==
- List of torpedo boat classes of the Royal Navy
