= HMS TB 13 =

History

United Kingdom
- Name: HMS TB 13
- Builder: J. Samuel White, Cowes
- Laid down: 14 March 1907
- Launched: 10 July 1907
- Completed: May 1908
- Fate: Sunk in collision 26 January 1916

General characteristics
- Class & type: Cricket-class coastal destroyer
- Displacement: 270 long tons (270 t)
- Length: 185 ft 3 in (56.46 m) oa
- Beam: 18 ft 0 in (5.49 m)
- Draught: 6 ft 9 in (2.06 m)
- Installed power: 4,000 shp (3,000 kW)
- Propulsion: 2× Yarrow boilers; Parsons steam turbines; 3 shafts
- Speed: 26 kn (30 mph; 48 km/h)
- Complement: 39
- Armament: 2 × 12-pounder (76 mm) guns; 3 × 18 inch (450 mm) torpedo tubes

HMS TB 13 was a Cricket-class coastal destroyer or torpedo-boat of the British Royal Navy. TB 13 was built by the shipbuilder J S White from 1907 to 1908. She was used for local patrol duties in the First World War and was sunk following a collision on 26 January 1916.

== Design ==
The Cricket-class was intended as a smaller and cheaper supplement to the large, fast, but expensive Tribal-class destroyer, particularly in coastal waters such as the English Channel. Twelve ships were ordered under the 1905–1906 shipbuilding programme, with 12 more ordered in November 1906 under the 1906–1907 programme. The 1906–1907 orders were distributed with four ships being built by J. Samuel White, two by Denny, two by Thornycroft, two by Hawthorn Leslie and one each by Palmers and Yarrow.

White's ships were 184 feet 3 inches (56.16 m) long with a beam of 18 feet 0 inches (5.49 m) and a draught of 6 feet 9 inches (2.06 m). Displacement was 270 long tons (270 t). The ships had turtleback (Note: A fore deck with exaggerated camber designed to throw off sea water at high speeds.) forecastles and two funnels. Two oil-fuelled Yarrow water-tube boilers fed steam to three-stage Parsons steam turbines, driving three propeller shafts. The machinery was rated at 4,000 shaft horsepower (3,000 kW), giving a speed of 26 knots (30 mph; 48 km/h).

Armament consisted of two 12-pounder (76-mm) 12 cwt guns (Note: 12 cwt refers to the weight of the gun in hundredweights), and three 18-inch (450 mm) torpedo tubes (in three single mounts). The ships had a crew of 35.

== Service ==
The first of White's 1906–1907 ships, TB 13 was laid down at White's Cowes shipyard on 14 March 1907, was launched on 10 July 1907 and completed in May 1908.

TB 13 commissioned into the Devonport Flotilla of the Home Fleet on 17 June 1909.

In July–August 1909, TB 13 took part in the Naval Manoeuvres, during which she collided with the torpedo-boat TB 19. TB 13 was badly holed, with her engine rooms and stokeholds flooded, and was brought into Portsmouth by the torpedo boat TB 20 and the torpedo-gunboat Niger.

In 1912, four Patrol Flotillas were formed with torpedo boats and older destroyers, with the duties of preventing enemy minelaying or torpedo attacks on the east coast of Britain. In March 1913, TB 13 was a member of the Seventh Flotilla, based at Devonport, but by July 1914 she had moved to the Eighth Flotilla, based at Chatham.

In November 1914, TB 13 was listed as part of the Eighth Patrol Flotilla, based on the Tyne.

TB 13 was lost in a collision in the North Sea on 26 January 1916.
