= HMS Wizard (1895) =

Conflict-class destroyer

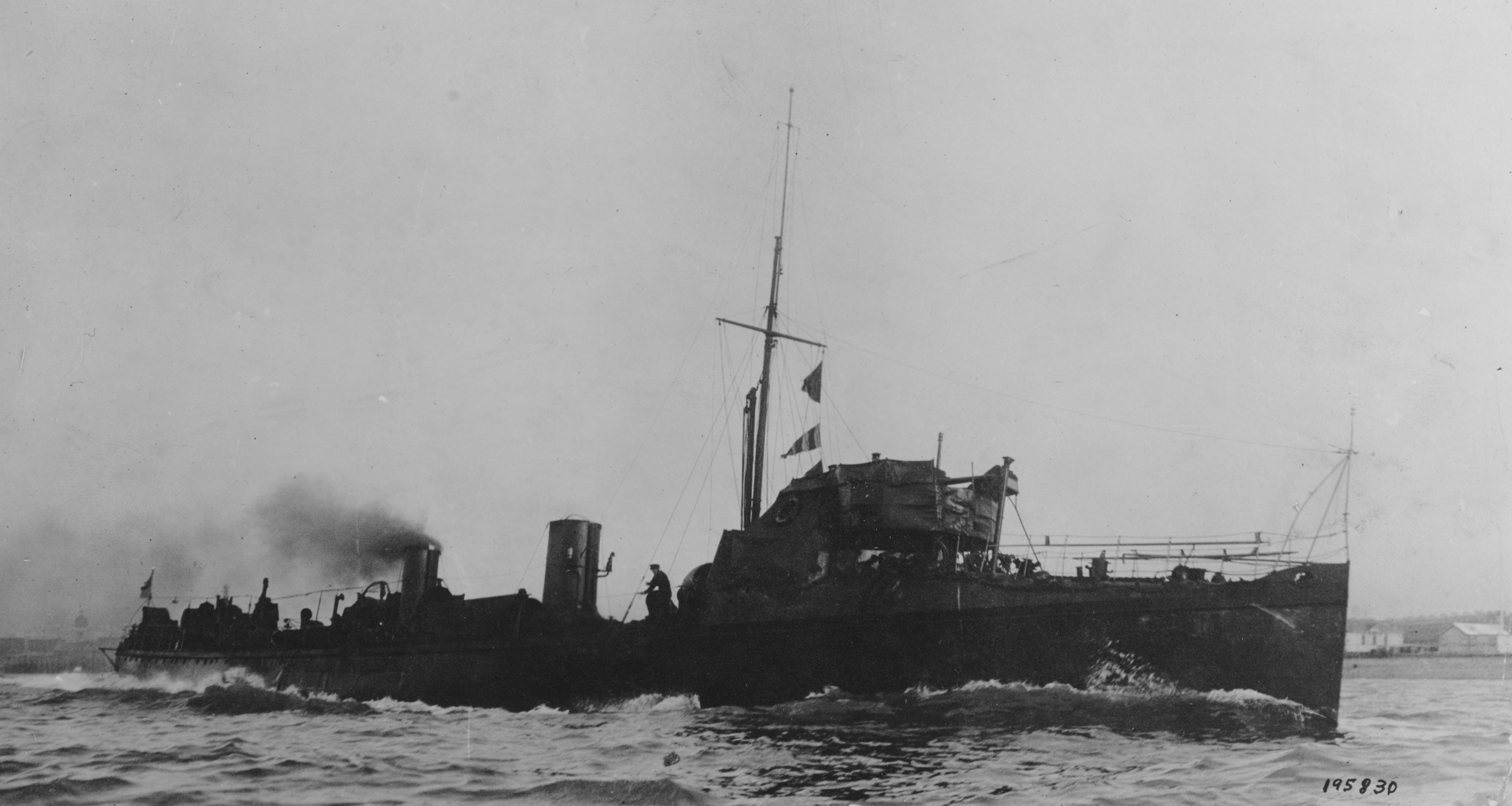

History

United Kingdom
- Name: Wizard
- Builder: J. Samuel White, East Cowes, Isle of Wight
- Launched: 26 February 1895
- Fate: Sold, 20 May 1920

General characteristics
- Class & type: Conflict-class destroyer
- Displacement: 320 long tons (325 t)
- Length: 200 ft (61 m)
- Propulsion: White-Forster boilers, 4,500 hp (3,356 kW)
- Speed: 27 knots (50 km/h; 31 mph)
- Complement: 53 officers and men
- Armament: 1 × QF 12 pounder 12 cwt naval gun; 2 × torpedo tubes

HMS Wizard was a Conflict-class destroyer built by the White shipyard for the Royal Navy, and launched on 26 February 1895. In 1910, she was reconstructed with only two funnels. She is believed to be the only destroyer fitted with in turning screws. She was sold in 1920.

== Construction and design ==
On 7 November 1893, the British Admiralty placed an order for three "27-knotter" torpedo boat destroyers (Wizard, Conflict and Teazer) with the shipbuilder J. Samuel White under the 1893–1894 shipbuilding programme for the Royal Navy, with delivery of the three ships to be completed by April 1895. In total, the 1893–1894 programme ordered 36 destroyers from 14 shipbuilders as a follow-on to the six prototype "26-knotter" destroyers ordered under the 1892–1893 programme.

The Admiralty did not specify a standard design for destroyers, laying down broad requirements, including a trial speed of 27 knots (31 mph; 50 km/h), a "turtleback" (Note: A fore deck with exaggerated camber designed to throw off sea water at high speeds.) forecastle and specified armament, which was to vary depending on whether the ship was to be used in the torpedo boat or gunboat role. As a torpedo boat, the planned armament was a single QF 12 pounder 12 cwt (3 in (76 mm) calibre) gun on a platform on the ship's conning tower (in practice the platform was also used as the ship's bridge), together with a secondary gun armament of three 6-pounder guns, and two 18 inch (450 mm) torpedo tubes. As a gunboat, one of the torpedo tubes could be removed to accommodate a further two six-pounders.

The three White-built destroyers were 205 ft 6 in (62.64 m) long overall and 200 ft 0 in (60.96 m) between perpendiculars, with a beam of 20 ft 0 11/16 in (6.11 m) and a draught of 8 ft 3 in (2.51 m). Displacement was 320 long tons (330 t) light and 360 long tons (370 t) full load. Three Water-tube boilers of White's own design fed steam to 2 four-cylinder triple-expansion steam engines, rated at 4,500 ihp (3,400 kW). Three funnels were fitted. Uniquely for early destroyers, Wizard's propellers rotated inwards, which was found to give the ship particularly poor handling.

Wizard was laid down at White's Cowes, Isle of Wight shipyard on 3 April 1894 as Yard number 947 and was launched on 27 February 1895. The three Wight-built destroyers had difficulty meeting their required contract speed of 27 knots, and Wizard was not accepted into service until July 1899.

== Operational service ==
Wizard served as tender to Excellent, the shore establishment near Portsmouth. In early December 1901, under the command of Lieutenant and Commander Frederick Hare Hallowes, she was damaged in a collision with a tug at Portsmouth, and her crew was transferred to the destroyer Hunter during repairs. She was paid off at Portsmouth on 13 May 1902 to be strengthened. Lieutenant Henry Wilcox Osborn was appointed in command on 11 June 1902, and she took part in the fleet review held at Spithead on 16 August 1902 for the coronation of King Edward VII. Lieutenant Robert Wilberforce Myburgh was appointed in command on 1 October 1902, but only two weeks later she was damaged in a collision with German liner Kronprinz Wilhelm, taking place in Southampton water. Lieutenant Myburgh and the crew were temporarily posted to HMS Star from 12 October while the ship went in for repairs, but were back aboard Wizard the following month when she was recommissioned on 8 November for service in the Portsmouth instructional flotilla.

Wizard was refitted by White's in 1904–1904. In 1908, Wizard was docked at Sheerness Dockyard in order to carry out a survey to determine if the ship's condition was good enough to warrant carrying out a refit to support further service, with the results confirming that the ship was worth the cost of a thorough refit. The refit was completed in April 1909, with the ship rejoining the Nore destroyer flotilla. In 1910 she had two of her funnels trunked together, making Wizard a two-funneled ship.

In November 1909, Wizard together with the scout cruiser Forward escorted the depot ship Vulcan and ten C-class submarines from Portsmouth to Dundee in Scotland, where the submarines were to be permanently based. On 3 September 1910, Wizard was at anchor near the Sunk Lightvessel in the Thames Estuary when she was rammed by a torpedo boat, with her hull holed near the engine room. Wizard was taken into Sheerness Dockyard for inspection of the damage and repair.

On 30 August 1912 the Admiralty directed all destroyers were to be grouped into classes designated by letters based on contract speed and appearance. After 30 September 1913, as a 27-knotter, Wizard was assigned to the A class.

In February 1913, Wizard was not part of an active flotilla, but was attached as a tender to the stone frigate (or shore establishment) HMS Excellent the gunnery school at Portsmouth, with a nucleus crew, although she was listed as in full commission by May 1913.

Wizard was part of the Portsmouth Local Defence Flotilla by June 1915. She remained part of the Portsmouth Local Defence Flotilla in March 1917.

In January 1920, Wizard was listed as for sale, and was sold on 20 May 1920 to Ward for scrapping at their Milford Haven yard.

== Pennant numbers ==
Pennant number	From	To
H.3C	1914	April 1917
D.98	January 1918	-
