= HMS TB 23 =

History

United Kingdom
- Name: HMS TB 23
- Builder: Yarrow, London
- Laid down: 10 February 1907
- Launched: 5 December 1907
- Completed: 19 February 1908
- Fate: Sold for scrap 9 May 1921

General characteristics
- Class & type: Cricket-class coastal destroyer
- Displacement: 270 long tons (270 t)
- Length: 177 ft 3 in (54.03 m)
- Beam: 18 ft 0 in (5.49 m)
- Draught: 5 ft 3 in (1.60 m)
- Installed power: 4,000 shp (3,000 kW)
- Propulsion: 2× Yarrow boilers; Parsons steam turbines; 3 shafts
- Speed: 26 kn (30 mph; 48 km/h)
- Complement: 39
- Armament: 2 × 12-pounder (76 mm) guns; 3 × 18 inch (450 mm) torpedo tubes

HMS TB 23 was a Cricket-class coastal destroyer or torpedo-boat of the British Royal Navy. TB 23 was built by the shipbuilder Yarrow from 1907 to 1908. She was used for local patrol duties in the First World War and was sold for scrap in 1921.

== Design ==
The Cricket-class was intended as a smaller and cheaper supplement to the large, fast, but expensive Tribal-class destroyer, particularly in coastal waters such as the English Channel. Twelve ships were ordered under the 1905–1906 shipbuilding programme, with 12 more ordered in November 1906 under the 1906–1907 programme. The 1906–1907 orders were distributed with four ships being built by J. Samuel White, two by Denny, two by Thornycroft, two by Hawthorn Leslie and one each by Palmers and Yarrow.

TB 23 was 177 feet 3 inches (54.03 m) long with a beam of 18 feet 0 inches (5.49 m) and a draught of 5 feet 3 inches (1.60 m). Displacement was 253 long tons (257 t). The ships had turtleback (Note: A fore deck with exaggerated camber designed to throw off sea water at high speeds.) forecastles and two funnels. Two oil-fuelled Yarrow water-tube boilers fed steam to three-stage Parsons steam turbines, driving three propeller shafts. The machinery was rated at 4,000 shaft horsepower (3,000 kW), giving a speed of 26 knots (30 mph; 48 km/h).

Armament consisted of two 12-pounder (76-mm) 12 cwt guns, (Note: 12 cwt refers to the weight of the gun in hundredweights) and three 18-inch (450 mm) torpedo tubes (in three single mounts). The ship had a crew of 35.

== Service ==
TB 23 was laid down at Yarrow's Cubitt Town, London shipyard on 10 February 1907, was launched on 5 December 1907 and completed on 19 February 1908.

TB 23 was commissioned as a tender to Blake at Sheerness Dockyard in March 1908. Later that month she was struck by the gunboat Pembroke while tied up at a buoy, damaging the torpedo-boat's stem.

In March 1913, TB 23 was based at Chatham, in commission, but with a nucleus crew, and remained at Chatham in July 1914. In November 1914, TB 23 was listed as part of the Local Defence Flotilla for The Nore, which had the duty of defending the Thames Estuary. She remained part of The Nore Local Defence Flotilla in December 1918.

By January 1919, TB 23, although still at the Nore, had left the Local Defence Flotilla, and by May, was listed as in Reserve at the Nore. By January 1920, TB 23 was, together with most of the remaining torpedo boats, listed as being for sale. She was sold to the shipbreaker Wards for scrapping at their Grays, Essex, yard on 9 May 1921, one of twelve Cricket-class ex-coastal destroyers sold to Wards on that day.

== Bibliography ==
- Brown, D. K. (2003). Warrior to Dreadnought: Warship Development 1860–1905. London: Chatham Publishing. ISBN 1-84067-5292.
- Corbett, Julian S. (1920). Naval Operations: Volume I, To the Battle of the Falklands December 1914. History of the Great War. London: Longmans, Green and Co.
- Dittmar, F. J.; Colledge, J. J. (1972). British Warships 1914–1919. Shepperton, UK: Ian Allan. ISBN 0-7110-0380-7.
- Friedman, Norman (2009). British Destroyers: From Earliest Days to the Second World War. Barnsley, UK: Seaforth Publishing. ISBN 978-1-84832-049-9.
- Friedman, Norman (2011). Naval Weapons of World War One. Barnsley, UK: Seaforth Publishing. ISBN 978-1-84832-100-7.
- Gardiner, Robert; Gray, Randal, eds. (1985). Conway's All The World's Fighting Ships 1906–1921. London: Conway Maritime Press. ISBN 0-85177-245-5.
- Gardiner, Robert; Lambert, Andrew, eds. (1992). Steam, Steel & Shellfire: The Steam Warship 1815–1905. Conway's History of the Ship. London: Conway Maritime Press. ISBN 0-85177-564-0.
- Hythe, Viscount, ed. (1912). The Naval Annual 1912. Portsmouth, UK: J. Griffin & Co.
