= HMS TB 9 =

British Navy vessel

History

United Kingdom
- Name: HMS TB 9
- Builder: Thornycroft, Chiswick, London
- Laid down: 1 November 1905
- Launched: 18 March 1907
- Completed: June 1907
- Fate: Sunk by collision, 26 July 1916

General characteristics
- Class & type: Cricket-class destroyer
- Displacement: 268 long tons (272 t)
- Length: 171 ft 6 in (52.27 m) oa
- Beam: 17 ft 6 in (5.33 m)
- Draught: 6 ft 4 1/2 in (1.943 m)
- Installed power: 3,750 shp (2,800 kW)
- Propulsion: 2× Yarrow boilers; Parsons steam turbines; 3 shafts
- Speed: 26 kn (30 mph; 48 km/h)
- Complement: 39
- Armament: 2 × 12-pounder (76 mm) guns; 3 × 18 inch (450 mm) torpedo tubes

HMS TB 9 (originally named HMS Grasshopper) was a Cricket-class coastal destroyer or torpedo-boat of the British Royal Navy. TB 9 was built by the shipbuilder Thornycroft from 1905 to 1907. She was used for local patrol duties in the First World War and was sunk following a collision in the North Sea on 26 July 1916.

== Design ==
The Cricket-class was intended as a smaller and cheaper supplement to the large, fast but expensive Tribal-class, particularly in coastal waters such as the English Channel. An initial order for twelve ships was placed by the Admiralty in May 1905 as part of the 1905–1906 shipbuilding programme, with five ships each ordered from Thornycroft and J. Samuel White and two from Yarrow.

Thornycroft's ships (the different shipbuilders built to their own design, although standardised machinery and armament was fitted) were 171 feet 6 inches (52.27 m) long overall and 166 feet 6 inches (50.75 m) between perpendiculars, with a beam of 17 feet 6 inches (5.33 m) and a draught of 6 feet 4 1/2 inches (1.943 m). Displacement was 244 long tons (248 t) normal and 268 long tons (272 t) deep load. The ships had turtleback (Note: A fore deck with exaggerated camber designed to throw off sea water at high speeds.) forecastles and two funnels. Two oil-fuelled Yarrow water-tube boilers fed steam to three-stage Parsons steam turbines, driving three propeller shafts. The machinery was designed to give 3,750 shaft horsepower (2,800 kW), with a speed of 26 knots (30 mph; 48 km/h) specified.

Armament consisted of two 12-pounder (76-mm) 12 cwt guns (Note: 12 cwt refers to the weight of the gun in hundredweights), and three 18-inch (450 mm) torpedo tubes (in three single mounts). The ships had a crew of 39.

== Service ==
The fourth of the five torpedo-boats built by Thornycroft under the 1905–1906 programme was laid down as HMS Grasshopper at their Chiswick, London shipyard on 1 November 1905. In 1906, the ships of the class, including Grasshopper, were redesignated as torpedo-boats, losing their names in the process, with Grasshopper becoming TB 9. She was launched on 18 March 1907, as the last torpedo-craft launched at Thornycroft's Chiswick yard before the company moved to their new shipyard at Woolston, Southampton. She was completed in June 1907.

TB 9 had her turbines rebladed at Chatham dockyard in the summer of 1908. She rejoined the Nore Flotilla after completing a refit early in 1910.

On 23 November 1914, the German submarine U-21 stopped and sunk the merchant ship Malachite on the approaches to Le Havre. Traffic between Southampton and Le Havre was stopped, with French destroyers and torpedo boats carrying out a sweep of the area with the hope of driving the submarine away. As there were six transports stuck in Southampton, needing to get to France, it was decided to provide a strong escort for the transports. On the morning of 24 November 1914, TB 9 and the destroyer Conflict, both part of the Portsmouth local defence flotilla, escorted one of the transports, with the remaining five ships being escorted by destroyers sent from Harwich.

On 26 July 1916 TB 9 was sunk in a collision in the North Sea with the destroyer Matchless (which was returning to Harwich after a collision with the destroyer Manly).
