= List of torpedo boat classes of the Royal Navy =

This is a list of torpedo boat classes of the Royal Navy of the United Kingdom, organised chronologically by entry into service. This article's coverage is restricted to the steam-powered torpedo boats built for or acquired by the British Navy between 1876 (the date on which the Admiralty ordered the first torpedo boat to carry the self-propelled Whitehead torpedo) and 1905; the final batch of 36 steam-turbine-powered torpedo boats from 1906 to 1908 were originally rated as coastal destroyers and will be found under Cricket-class destroyers, while later torpedo boats introduced during World War 1, powered by internal combustion engines, will be found under Motor Torpedo Boats.

== Torpedo boats ==
Ever since the first use of spar torpedoes in the American Civil War and the Russo-Turkish War (1877–78), the world's sea powers continued to refine the small torpedo craft concept to employ the new automobile torpedoes (Whitehead torpedoes) that could continue the legacy of small and relatively inexpensive vessels able to challenge much larger vessels. The Royal Navy purchased 1st and 2nd class torpedo boats for offensive and defensive combat roles, respectively.

Later – especially to counter the French automobile defense – the British Navy primarily ordered torpedo boat catchers (or torpedo gunboats), which proved too slow for the task of dealing with torpedo boats, and subsequently torpedo boat destroyers (TBDs) - or destroyers as they soon became called.

== 1st class torpedo boats ==
First class torpedo boats were designed for independent inshore operations. They were small, but large enough to patrol coastal waters and enjoy some limited endurance beyond their supporting port or tender. Nevertheless, they were found to be deployed overseas - notably to the Mediterranean - and eventually worldwide.

=== Lightning-design ===
- John I. Thornycroft & Company, Chiswick. The first torpedo boat, TB.1 (originally called Lightning), was ordered on 26 January 1876 and underwent trials on 22 May 1877; her dimensions were slightly different from her successors (TB.2 - TB.12) which were all ordered on 3 October 1877 and notably deleted the coach roof of the prototype.

Number	Builder	Yard No.	Launched	Disposal
TB.1	Thornycroft	47	1877	Sold for scrap 1896
TB.2	Thornycroft	71	1878	Sold for scrap 1897
TB.3	Thornycroft	72	1878	Sold for scrap by 1906
TB.4	Thornycroft	73	1879	Sold for merchant use 1905, renamed Rocket
TB.5	Thornycroft	74	1879	Sold for scrap 1897
TB.6	Thornycroft	75	1879	Sold for scrap 1906 at Capetown
TB.7	Thornycroft	76	1879	Sold for merchant use 1904, renamed Mosquito
TB.8	Thornycroft	77	1879	Sold for scrap 1903 at Hong Kong
TB.9	Thornycroft	78	1879	Sold for scrap 1900 at Malta
TB.10	Thornycroft	79	1879	Sold for scrap 1904 at Malta
TB.11	Thornycroft	80	1880	Sold for scrap 1904
TB.12	Thornycroft	81	1880	Sold for scrap 1904

- Maudslay, Sons and Field, Lambeth
  - TB.13
- Yarrow & Company, Poplar
  - TB.14
- Hanna, Donald & Wilson, Paisley
  - TB.15
- Stephen Lewin, Poole
  - TB.16 – not taken into service
- Yarrow & Company, Limited

These two boats were ordered for Russia, but were purchased by the British Admiralty during the Russo-Turkish war scare.

Number	Builder	Yard No.	Launched	Disposal
TB.17	Yarrow	419	1878	Sold for scrap in 1907 at Malta
TB.18	Yarrow	420	1878	Sold for scrap in 1902 at Gibraltar

- J. Samuel White, Cowes
  - TB.19
- G. & J. Rennie, Paisley
  - TB.20
- Des Vignes, Chertsey
  - TB.21 – not accepted from RN because of lack of performance; the number was thus re-used for the first of the 113-footer group.

=== 113-Footers ===
On 10 December 1883 the Admiralty wrote both to John I. Thornycroft & Company and to Yarrow & Company asking them to tender for one or more improved First Class torpedo boats.

==== TB.21 class ====
on 21 December 1883 Thornycroft replied forwarding their design HO 1992 and the specification in accordance with the Admiralty's letter. The dimensions were similar to those of the Sookhoun (Yard number 167, built 1882 for the Imperial Russian Navy) and the Childers (Yard number 172, built 1882 for the Victorian Government in Australia). Two boats were ordered by the Admiralty on 19 January 1884 for delivery in 9 and 10 months respectively. They ran trials on 30 April and 25 May 1885 respectively.

Number	Builder	Yard No.	Launched	Disposal
TB.21	Thornycroft	201	18 March 1885	Sold for scrap in 1907 at Malta
TB.22	Thornycroft	202	5 May 1885	Sold for scrap in 1907 at Malta

==== TB.23 class ====
The Admiralty similarly placed orders with Yarrow for two boats (built at Poplar).

Number	Builder	Yard No.	Launched	Disposal
TB.23	Yarrow	666	1886	Sold for scrap in 1905
TB.24	Yarrow	667	1886	Sold for scrap in 1904

=== 125-Footers ===
All 53 boats of this group (TB.25 to TB.79, excluding TB.39 and TB.40) carried 5 x 14-in torpedo tubes (one bow tube plus two pairs of deck tubes) and a complement of 16. Alternatively they could carry a gun armament of two 3-pounders and four MGs in lieu of the deck tubes. The bow tubes were later removed.

==== TB.25 class ====
TB.25 / TB.41 class
Class overview
- Builders: Thornycroft
- Completed: 25
- Lost: 3
- Scrapped: 22

General characteristics
- Displacement: 60 long tons (61 t) normal; 93 long tons (94 t) deep load
- Length: 125 ft (38.10 m) pp
- Beam: 12 ft 6 in (3.81 m)
- Draught: 6 ft 0 in (1.83 m)
- Propulsion: 700 ihp (520 kW)
- Speed: 20.25 kn (37.50 km/h; 23.30 mph)
- Complement: 16
- Armament: 3 × 2-barrelled Nordenfelt 1-in MGs; 5 × 14-inch torpedo tubes

The first of these boats was ordered from Thornycroft on 24 February 1885, and another four boats were ordered on 30/31 March 1885.

Number	Builder	Yard No.	Launched	Disposal
TB.25	Thornycroft	212	7 October 1885	Sold for scrap October 1919
TB.26	Thornycroft	218	22 October 1885	Sold for scrap 2 October 1919
TB.27	Thornycroft	219	26 October 1885	Sold for scrap 2 October 1919
TB.28	Thornycroft	220	7 November 1885	Expended as a target at Cape Town in 1898
TB.29	Thornycroft	221	19 November 1885	Sold for scrap at Cape Town 1 July 1919

==== TB.30 class ====
- Yarrow & Company, Limited (1885–86)

These four boats were ordered on 30/31 March 1885.

Number	Builder	Yard No.	Completed	Disposal
TB.30	Yarrow	708	1886	Sold for scrap ca. 1905
TB.31	Yarrow	709	1886	Sold for scrap 1913
TB.32	Yarrow	710	1886	Sold for scrap ca. 1905
TB.33	Yarrow	711	1886	Sold for scrap 1 August 1919

==== TB.34 class ====
- J. Samuel White (1885–87). Based on White's TB.19 with "turnabout" stern but enlarged and built with more beam than the Thornycroft and Yarrow boats. All five took part in the 1887 Naval Review. TB.34 spent all her life in Home waters, but TB.35 and TB.36 sailed in March 1888 for the China Station, followed later by TB.37 and TB.38; these four spent all their lives on this station and were eventually sold together at Hong Kong in 1919.

Number	Builder	Yard No.	Completed	Disposal
TB.34	White	683	August 1886	Sold for scrap 2 October 1919
TB.35	White	684	January 1887	Sold for scrap 27 November 1919
TB.36	White	685	February 1887	Sold for scrap 27 November 1919
TB.37	White	686	February 1887	Sold for scrap 27 November 1919
TB.38	White	687	March 1887	Sold for scrap 27 November 1919

=== 100-Footers (purchases) ===
- Yarrow & Company, Limited. These two boats of 40 tons each were ordered for the Chilean Navy as Glaura and Fresia, but were purchased by the British Navy in 1888 and deployed to the West coast of Canada.

Number	Builder	Yard No.	Completed	Disposal
TB.39	Yarrow	511	1882	Sold for scrap 2.1905 at Esquimault
TB.40	Yarrow	525	1882	Sold for scrap 2.1905 at Esquimault

==== TB.41 class ====
- John I. Thornycroft & Company (1886)

These twenty boats were ordered on 30 April or 1 May 1885, and were identical with the previous four Thornycroft boats.

Number	Builder	Yard No.	Launched	Disposal
TB.41	Thornycroft	222	1885	Sold for scrap 1 August 1919
TB.42	Thornycroft	223	4 December 1885	Sold for scrap 2 October 1919
TB.43	Thornycroft	224	1885	Sold for scrap at Malta 18 December 1919
TB.44	Thornycroft	225	1885	Sold for scrap at Malta 18 December 1919
TB.45	Thornycroft	226	21 December 1885	Sold for scrap 1 August 1919
TB.46	Thornycroft	227	4 January 1886	Wrecked 27 December 1915 in Mediterranean, but salved and sold for scrap 1920
TB.47	Thornycroft	228	28 June 1886	Sold for scrap ca. 1908
TB.48	Thornycroft	229	1886	Sold for scrap ca. 1915
TB.49	Thornycroft	230	1886	Sold for scrap 1 August 1919
TB.50	Thornycroft	231	17 June 1886	Sold for scrap 23 February 1920
TB.51	Thornycroft	232	30 July 1886	Sold for scrap ca. 1913
TB.52	Thornycroft	233	1886	Sold for scrap 19 December 1919
TB.53	Thornycroft	234	16 August 1886	Sold for scrap 1913
TB.54	Thornycroft	235	28 August 1886	Sold for scrap 1 August 1919
TB.55	Thornycroft	236	29 August 1886	Sold for scrap 23 February 1920
TB.56	Thornycroft	237	1 October 1886	Foundered off Damietta 17 May 1906
TB.57	Thornycroft	238	2 October 1886	Sold for scrap 2 October 1919
TB.58	Thornycroft	239	18 October 1886	Sold for scrap 19 December 1919
TB.59	Thornycroft	240	11 November 1886	Sold for scrap ca. 1913
TB.60	Thornycroft	241	10 December 1886	Sold for scrap at Cape Town 1 July 1919

==== TB.61 class ====
This batch was ordered on 30 April or 1 May 1885, one month after the TB.30 to TB.33 batch with which they were identical.
The last two (TB.79 and TB.80) differed in detail and in dimensions; the 75-ton TB.79 was 128ft 8in in oa length; the 105-ton TB.80 was 134ft 9in bp by 14ft beam.

Number	Builder	Yard No.	Completed	Disposal
TB.61	Yarrow	715	1886	Sold for scrap 1909
TB.62	Yarrow	716	1886	Sold for scrap 1905
TB.63	Yarrow	717	September 1886	Sold for scrap 18 December 1919 at Malta
TB.64	Yarrow	718	September 1886	Wrecked 21 March 1915 in the Aegean
TB.65	Yarrow	719	October 1886	Sold for scrap 2 October 1919
TB.66	Yarrow	720	August 1886	Sold for scrap 30 June 1920
TB.67	Yarrow	721	August 1886	Sold for scrap 27 January 1920
TB.68	Yarrow	722	August 1886	Sold for scrap 30 June 1920
TB.69	Yarrow	723	1886	Sold for scrap ca. 1906
TB.70	Yarrow	724	August 1886	Sold for scrap 18 December 1919 at Malta
TB.71	Yarrow	725	1886	Sold for scrap 5 July 1923
TB.72	Yarrow	726	July 1886	Sold for scrap 19 December 1919
TB.73	Yarrow	727	1886	Sold for scrap 6 February 1923
TB.74	Yarrow	728	December 1886	Sold for scrap 27 January 1920
TB.75	Yarrow	729	1886	Sunk 8 August 1892 in collision with TB.77.
TB.76	Yarrow	730	1886	Sold for scrap 30 June 1920
TB.77	Yarrow	731	August 1886	Sold for scrap 27 March 1920
TB.78	Yarrow	732	January 1887	Sold for scrap 2 October 1919
TB.79	Yarrow	733	December 1886	Sold for scrap 19 November 1919
TB.80	Yarrow	748	May 1887	Sold for scrap 22 October 1921

=== 153-Footer (HMS Swift) ===
- J. Samuel White
  - TB.81

=== 130-Footers ===
(ordered under 1887-88 Programme, as repeats of TB.79)

- Yarrow & Company, Limited

Number	Builder	Yard No.	Completed	Disposal
TB.82	Yarrow	800	June 1889	Sold for scrap 27 March 1920, then re-sold 22 October 1921.
TB.83	Yarrow	801	June 1889	Sold for scrap 12 October 1919
TB.84	Yarrow	802	1889	Sunk in collision 17 April 1906 with HMS Ardent
TB.85	Yarrow	803	September 1889	Sold for scrap 27 March 1920, then re-sold 22 October 1921.
TB.86	Yarrow	803	September 1889	Sold for scrap 27 March 1920, then re-sold 22 October 1921.
TB.87	Yarrow	805	September 1889	Sold for scrap 27 March 1920.

=== 140-Footers ===
Ten "140-footer" were ordered to four different builders' designs under the 1892-93 Programme. They were built in the same period as the first of the 26-knotter TBDs (torpedo boat destroyers) which rapidly superseded the traditional torpedo boat, and like them carried the new 18-in torpedoes, which marked a step-change both in size and capability. All these vessels were quickly deployed to the Mediterranean and stayed there throughout the rest of their service lives, based primarily on Gibraltar.

==== TB.88 class ====
Number	Builder	Yard No.	Completed	Disposal
TB.88	Yarrow		1894	Sold for scrap 13 October 1919
TB.89	Yarrow		1894	Sold for scrap 13 October 1919
TB.90	Yarrow		1894	Capsized 25 April 1918 in heavy weather off Gibraltar

==== TB.91 class ====
These three boats were ordered from John I. Thornycroft & Company on 4 July 1892, exactly one week after the orders were placed for Thornycroft's Daring and Decoy torpedo-boat destroyers, and thus followed them in sequence of Yard numbers.

Number	Builder	Yard No.	Completed	Disposal
TB.91	Thornycroft	289	1894	Sold for scrap 13 October 1919
TB.92	Thornycroft	290	1894	Sold for scrap 1920 at Gibraltar
TB.93	Thornycroft	291	1894	Sold for scrap 13 October 1919

==== TB.94 class ====
- J. Samuel White

Number	Builder	Yard No.	Launched	Disposal
TB.94	White	910	27 July 1893	Sold for scrap 13 October 1919
TB.95	White	911	1894 comp.	Sold for scrap 13 October 1919
TB.96	White	912	1894 comp.	Sunk in collision 1 November 1919 with s.s. Tringa off Gibraltar

==== TB.97 ====
- Laird Brothers, Birkenhead

Number	Builder	Yard No.	Launched	Disposal
TB.97	Laird		16 September 1893	Sold for scrap 1920 at Gibraltar

=== 135-Footers ===
(ex Royal Indian Marine boats, taken over by RN in 1892 and given numbers in 1900 instead of their original names)

- John I. Thornycroft & Company
  - TB.100 (ex-Baluchi)
  - TB.102 (ex-Karen)
  - TB.103 (ex-Pathan)
- Hanna, Donald & Wilson
  - TB.101 (ex-Gurkha)
- J. Samuel White
  - TB.104 (ex-Mahratta)
  - TB.105 (ex-Sikh)
  - TB.106 (ex-Rajput)

=== 160-Footers ===
The Royal Navy's thirteen 160 Footers comprised three distinct classes, each built to their constructors' own designs.

==== TB.98 class ====
TB.98 class
Class overview
- Builders: Thornycroft
- Completed: 4
- Lost: 0
- Scrapped: 4

General characteristics
- Displacement: 185 long tons (188 t) normal; 199 long tons (202 t) deep load
- Length: 160 ft (48.77 m) pp
- Beam: 17 ft 0 in (5.18 m)
- Draught: 5 ft 10 in (1.78 m)
- Propulsion: 3,000 ihp (2,200 kW)
- Speed: 25 kn (46 km/h; 29 mph)
- Complement: 32
- Armament: 3 × 3-pounder guns; 3 × 18-inch torpedo tubes

These four boats, discontinuously numbered because the seven boats built for the Royal Indian Marine in 1892 were given the numbers 100 to 106, were built by Thornycroft at Chiswick to a common design. The first two (Yard numbers 346 and 347) were ordered on 21 November 1899 under the 1899-1900 Programme and were completed in July 1902. The later pair (Yard numbers 351 and 352) were ordered on 25 April 1900 under the 1900-1901 Programme and were completed in September 1902.

Number	Builder	Launched	Trials	Notes
TB.98	Thornycroft	22 January 1901	16 May 1901	Sold for scrap 30 June 1920
TB.99	Thornycroft	early 1901	10 June 1901	Sank 19 June 1907 off Berry Head, but salvaged and returned to service in 1909; Sold for scrap 29 July 1920
TB.107	Thornycroft	2 July 1901	23 September 1901	Sold for scrap 29 July 1920
TB.108	Thornycroft	30 August 1901	18 November 1901	Sold for scrap 29 July 1920

==== TB.109 class ====
TB.109 class
Class overview
- Builders: Thornycroft
- Completed: 5
- Lost: 0
- Scrapped: 5

General characteristics
- Displacement: 200 long tons (200 t) normal; 199 long tons (202 t) deep load
- Length: 164 ft 9 in (50.22 m) wl
- Beam: 17 ft 3 in (5.26 m)
- Draught: 5 ft 6 in (1.68 m)
- Propulsion: 3,050 ihp (2,270 kW)
- Speed: 25 kn (46 km/h; 29 mph)
- Complement: 32
- Armament: 3 × 3-pounder guns; 3 × 18-inch torpedo tubes

Five more Thornycroft boats were built under the 1901-02 Programme to a different design, about 7% greater in displacement and being four feet longer than the TB.98 boats. The first four of these boats were ordered from Thornycroft on 11 November 1901, and the fifth on 14 December 1901. Their yard numbers were 359 to 363 respectively.

Number	Builder	Launched	Trials	Disposal
TB.109	Thornycroft	22 July 1902	18 February 1903	Sold for scrap 27 March 1920
TB.110	Thornycroft	5 September 1902	20 February 1903	Sold for scrap 27 March 1920
TB.111	Thornycroft	31 October 1902	24 March 1903	Sold for scrap 10 February 1920
TB.112	Thornycroft	15 January 1903	23 April 1903	Sold for scrap 10 February 1920
TB.113	Thornycroft	12 February 1903	7 June 1903	Sold for scrap 19 December 1919

==== TB.114 class ====
TB.114 class
Class overview
- Builders: White
- Completed: 4
- Lost: 1
- Scrapped: 3

General characteristics
- Displacement: 219 long tons (223 t) light; 199 long tons (202 t) deep load
- Length: 165 ft 9 in (50.52 m) bp
- Beam: 17 ft 6 in (5.33 m)
- Draught: 5 ft 6 in (1.68 m)
- Propulsion: 3,050 ihp (2,270 kW)
- Speed: 25 kn (46 km/h; 29 mph)
- Complement: 32
- Armament: 3 × 3-pounder guns; 3 × 18-inch torpedo tubes

The remaining four boats, similar in scale to the TB.109 models, were constructed by J. Samuel White at Cowes, and were all commissioned on 3 January 1905.

Number	Builder	Yard No.	Launched	Disposal
TB.114	J Samuel White	1155	8 June 1903	Sold for scrap 1919
TB.115	J Samuel White	1156	19 November 1903	Sold for scrap 1919
TB.116	J Samuel White	1157	21 December 1903	Sold for scrap 22 October 1921
TB.117	J Samuel White	1158	18 February 1904	Sunk following collision with merchant vessel ss Kamourska in English Channel 10 June 1917 (3 killed)

=== Cricket class ===
No further 1st Class torpedo boats were ordered until 1905, when twelve new vessels were projected to meet the needs for coastal defence. Such new torpedo boats were proposed in December 1904 to be vessels not exceeding 165ft in length and 250 tons, carrying two 12-pounder guns and three torpedo tubes, and capable of 26 knots for 8 hours with an endurance of 1,000 nautical miles at 15 knots. Such criteria would have closely paralleled the original 27-knotter torpedo-boat destroyers of 1893-4, although the new type were to have steam turbines and oil fuel, and so the new ships were quickly re-designated as 'coastal destroyers'. Thornycroft, Yarrow and White were invited to tender, and each produced plans for a three-shaft propulsion with an astern turbine on the centre shaft; each project was larger than first required, being between 175ft and 180ft in length. These twelve coastal destroyers, given names rather than simply numbers, were ordered under the 1905-06 Programme to the three builders' own designs. In October 1906 these were re-classified as torpedo boats and their original names were replaced by the numbers TB.1 to TB.12. To avoid confusion with the surviving early 1st Class torpedo boats, those survivors bearing numbers up to TB.79 inclusive were renumbered to include a "0" before the number (e.g. TB.79 became TB.079). Twelve more of these new torpedo boats were ordered in the 1906-07 Programme, to enlarged designs, and a final twelve in the 1907-08 Programme; these were numbered TB.13 to TB.36.

== 2nd class torpedo boats ==
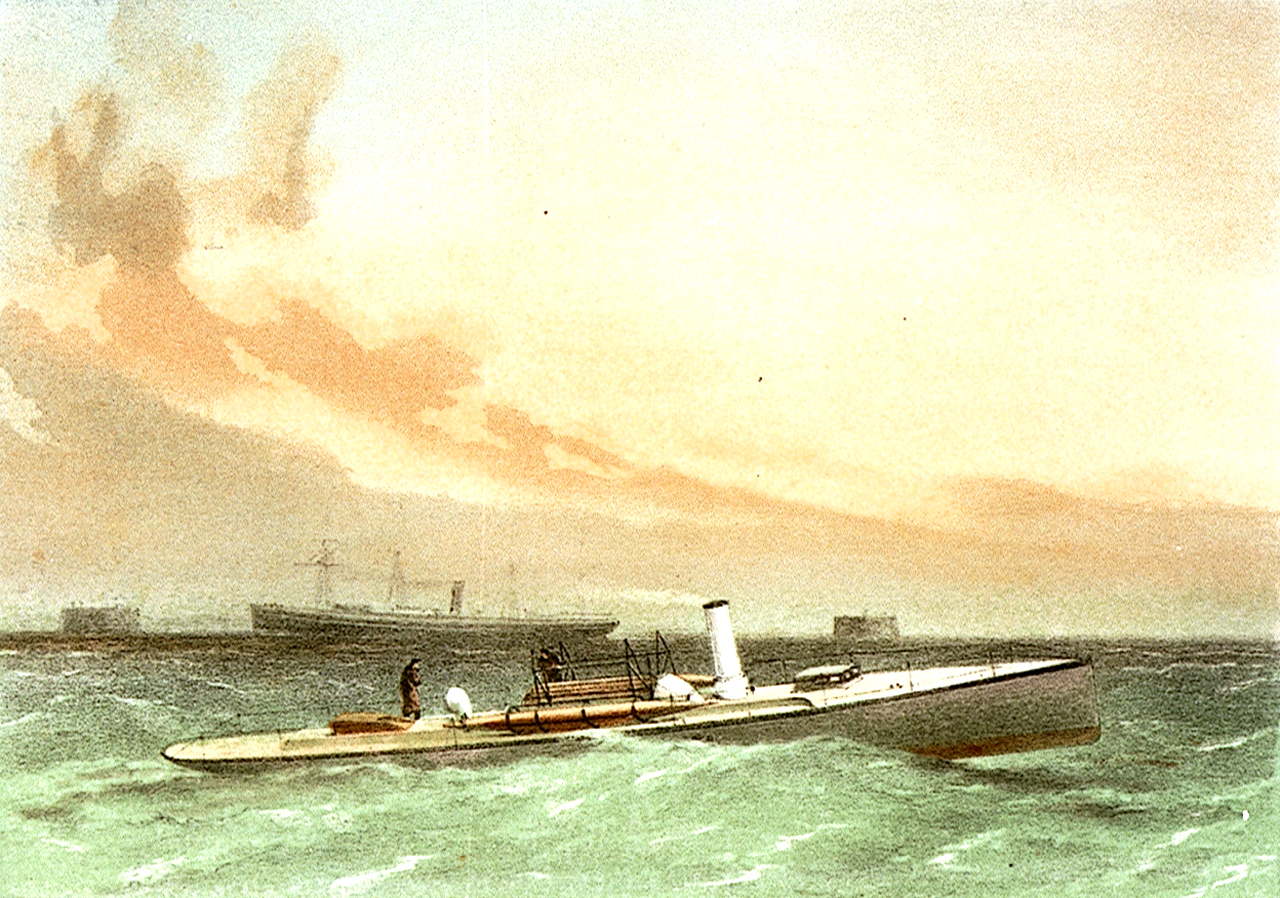
2nd Class torpedo boat, with the TB depot ship HMS Hecla in the background

These 74 small (generally 60ft to 66ft in length) torpedo boats were to be carried on larger ships or given to dedicated torpedo boat carriers, such as HMS Vulcan and HMS Hecla. With a single (US-built) exception, all were constructed by Thornycroft at Chiswick (45 boats), by Yarrow at Poplar (16 boats) or by White at Cowes (12 boats, with wooden hulls). These boats were designed as harbour defence and coastal boats, but their small size meant their endurance and sea-keeping abilities would be quite modest. Note that their numbering was in a separate sequence from that of the 1st Class boats. Similar boats were built for the naval services of New Zealand (4 boats) and the Australian colonies of Victoria (3 boats), Queensland (2 boats), and Tasmania (1 boat); all of these were built by Thornycroft.

=== Thornycroft 2nd class orders 1877 ===
- John I. Thornycroft & Company. 60ft Length overall, and 10.75 tons. Ordered 3 October 1877, completed 1878 (first six) and 1879 (last six). The first four were attached to HMS Hecla after their completion.

Number	Builder	Yard number	Launched	Disposal
TB.51	Thornycroft	82	October 1878	Sold for scrap 1907
TB.52	Thornycroft	83	October 1878	Sold for scrap 1904
TB.53	Thornycroft	84	September 1878	Sold for scrap 1904
TB.54	Thornycroft	85	October 1878	Sold for scrap 1904
TB.55	Thornycroft	86	December 1878	Sold for scrap 1902
TB.56	Thornycroft	87	December 1878	Sold for scrap 1904
TB.57	Thornycroft	88	June 1879	Sold for scrap 1904
TB.58	Thornycroft	89	February 1879	Sold for scrap 1902
TB.59	Thornycroft	90	February 1879	Sold for scrap 1902
TB.60	Thornycroft	91	June 1879	Sold for scrap 1902
TB.61	Thornycroft	92	September 1879	Sold for scrap 1902
TB.62	Thornycroft	93	September 1879	Foundered in North America; 21 October 1890, in tow of HMS Buzzard

=== Herreschoff purchase ===
- Herreschoff Manufacturing Company, Bristol, Rhode Island
  - No. 63

=== Thornycroft 2nd class orders 1879 ===
- John I. Thornycroft & Company. An improvement on the previous batch, being 62ft 10in in length and 13 tons. Ordered 27 May 1879 or 11 July 1879, completed 1880 (first two) and 1881-82 (other eight).

Number	Builder	Yard number	Trial date	Disposal
TB.64	Thornycroft	104	16 July 1880	Sold for scrap ?1907
TB.65	Thornycroft	105	12 July 1880	Sold for scrap 1907
TB.66	Thornycroft	106	4 January 1882	Sold for scrap 1905
TB.67	Thornycroft	107	10 January 1882	Sold for scrap 1905
TB.68	Thornycroft	108	27 February 1882	Transferred to Newfoundland
TB.69	Thornycroft	109	17 October 1881	Sold for scrap 1906
TB.70	Thornycroft	110	23 August 1881	Sold for scrap 1906
TB.71	Thornycroft	111	3 March 1882	Sold for scrap 1909
TB.72	Thornycroft	112	23 February 1881	Sold for scrap 1898
TB.73	Thornycroft	113	23 February 1881	Sold for scrap 1905

=== Yarrow & Company TB.74 Class ===
Number	Builder	Yard number	Launched	Disposal
TB.74	Yarrow	457	1883	Sold for scrap 1906
TB.75	Yarrow	456	1883	Sold for scrap 1903

=== Thornycroft 2nd class orders 1880 ===
- John I. Thornycroft & Company. Ordered 28 February 1880 (contract 3 March 1880). The first two (TB.76 and TB.77) differed from the others by being fitted experimentally with the Herreschoff spiral water tube boiler (first seen in Royal Navy service with 2nd Class TB.63 built by Herreschoff).

Number	Builder	Yard number	Launch date	Trial date	Disposal
TB.76	Thornycroft	117	3 January 1883	12 Match 1883	Sold for scrap 1906
TB.77	Thornycroft	118	24 January 1883	10 March 1883	Sold for scrap 1906
TB.78	Thornycroft	119	December 1882	9 December 1882	Sold for scrap 1906
TB.79	Thornycroft	120	16 January 1882	21 January 1882	Sold for scrap 1902
TB.80	Thornycroft	121	September 1882	20 September 1882	Sold for scrap 1907
TB.81	Thornycroft	122	5 October 1882	27 October 1882	Sold for scrap 1902
TB.82	Thornycroft	123	17 October 1882	27 October 1882	Sold for scrap 1906
TB.83	Thornycroft	124	11 November 1882	7 December 1882	Sold for scrap 1898
TB.84	Thornycroft	125	24 November 1882	8 December 1882	Sold for scrap 1904
TB.85	Thornycroft	126	17 January 1883	5 February 1883	Sold for scrap by 1912
TB.86	Thornycroft	127	1 February 1883	6 February 1883	Sold for scrap by 1912
TB.87	Thornycroft	128	17 February 1883	2 March 1883	Sold for scrap 1905
TB.88	Thornycroft	129	20 February 1883	3 March 1883	Sold for scrap by 1912
TB.89	Thornycroft	130	2 March 1883	13 March 1883	Sold for scrap 1907
TB.90	Thornycroft	131	3 March 1883	8 March 1883	Sold for scrap 1902
TB.91	Thornycroft	132	9 March 1883	14 March 1883	Sold for scrap 1902
TB.92	Thornycroft	133	4 April 1883	10 April 1883	Sold for scrap 1902
TB.93	Thornycroft	134	5 April 1883	11 April 18832	Sold for scrap 1898
TB.94	Thornycroft	135	18 April 1883	23 April 1883	Sold for scrap 1906
TB.95	Thornycroft	136	20 April 1883	25 April 1883	Sold for scrap 1912

=== Yarrow & Company TB.96 Class ===
Number	Builder	Yard number	Completed	Disposal
TB.96	Yarrow	495	1883	Sold for scrap 1906
TB.97	Yarrow	510	1883	Sold for scrap 1902

=== Thornycroft water-jet propelled 2nd class ===
This was an experimental craft designed by John I. Thornycroft and Sydney Walker Barnaby (chief scientific consultor for Thornycroft). Ordered 21 December 1880.

Number	Builder	Yard number	Launched	Disposal
TB.98	Thornycroft	141	13 September 1883	Fate unknown

=== Thornycroft 2nd class orders 1884 ===
- John I. Thornycroft & Company. Ordered 17 November 1884.

Number	Builder	Yard number	Launched	Disposal
TB.99	Thornycroft	207	28 September 1885	Sold for scrap 1907
TB.100	Thornycroft	208	5 April 1886	Sold for scrap 22 October 1908

=== Yarrow & Company TB.39 Class ===
Number	Builder	Yard number	Completed	Disposal
TB.39	Yarrow	806	1889	Sold for scrap 1907
TB.40	Yarrow	807	1889	Sold for scrap 1907
TB.41	Yarrow	808	1889	Sold for scrap 1907
TB.42	Yarrow	809	1889	Sold for scrap 1907
TB.43	Yarrow	810	1889	Sold for scrap 1907
TB.44	Yarrow	811	1889	Sold for scrap 1907
TB.45	Yarrow	812	1889	Sold for scrap 1912
TB.46	Yarrow	813	1889	Sold for scrap 1912
TB.47	Yarrow	814	1889	Sold for scrap 1912
TB.48	Yarrow	915	1889	Sold for scrap 1912

=== Yarrow & Company TB.49 Class ===
Number	Builder	Yard number	Completed	Disposal
TB.49	Yarrow	765	1888	Sold for scrap 1906
TB.50	Yarrow	764	1888	Sold for scrap 1904

=== J. Samuel White wood TBs ===
The first nine were ordered in 1883, another two in 1887, and the last in 1888. Unlike the Thornycroft and Yarrow boats, they were wooden-hulled and were precursors of the 56ft steam pinnaces which superseded the Second Class steel boats (in a multi-role function).

Number	Builder	Yard number	Launched	Disposal
WTB.1	White	587	1883	Sold for scrap by 1905
WTB.2	White	588	1883	Sold for scrap 1900
WTB.3	White	591	1883	Sold for scrap by 1905
WTB.4	White	592	1883	Sold for scrap by 1905
WTB.5	White	602	1883	Sold for scrap 1909
WTB.6	White	603	1884	Sold for scrap by 1907
WTB.7	White	605	1884	Sold for scrap by 1905
WTB.8	White	646	1885	Sold for scrap by 1905
WTB.9	White	647	1885	Sold for scrap 1912
WTB.10	White	731	1887	Sold for scrap by 1905
WTB.11	White	732	1887	Sold for scrap 1912
WTB.12	White	745	1888	Sold for scrap 1910

== See also ==
- Coastal Motor Boat
- Motor Torpedo Boat
- Motor Gun Boat

== Bibliography ==
- Brown, Les (2023). Royal Navy Torpedo Vessels. Barnsley, UK: Seaforth Publishing. ISBN 978-1-3990-2285-9.
- Colledge, J. J.; Warlow, Ben & Bush, Steve (2020). Ships of the Royal Navy: The Complete Record of all Fighting Ships of the Royal Navy from the 15th Century to the Present (5th revised and updated ed.). Barnsley, UK: Seaforth Publishing. ISBN 978-1-5267-9327-0.
- Dittmar, F.J. and Colledge, J.J. British Warships 1914–1919. London: Ian Allan, 1972. ISBN 0-7110-0380-7.
- Friedman, Norman (2009). British Destroyers From Earliest Days to the Second World War. Annapolis, Maryland: Naval Institute Press. ISBN 978-1-59114-081-8.
- Roberts, John (1979). "Great Britain (including Empire Forces)". In Chesneau, Roger & Kolesnik, Eugene M. (eds.). Conway's All the World's Fighting Ships 1860–1905. Greenwich: Conway Maritime Press. pp. 1–113. ISBN 0-8317-0302-4.
- Winfield, Rif & Lyon, David The Sail and Steam Navy List: All the Ships of the Royal Navy 1815-1889. Chatham Publishing, 2004. ISBN 1-86176-032-9.
