= HMS TB 11 =

History

United Kingdom
- Name: HMS TB 11
- Builder: Yarrow, Poplar, London
- Laid down: 23 November 1905
- Launched: 29 January 1907
- Completed: July 1907
- Fate: Sunk by mine, 7 March 1916

General characteristics
- Class & type: Cricket-class coastal destroyer
- Displacement: 291 long tons (296 t)
- Length: 175 ft 9 in (53.57 m) oa
- Beam: 18 ft 0 in (5.49 m)
- Draught: 5 ft 8 in (1.73 m)
- Installed power: 4,000 shp (3,000 kW)
- Propulsion: 2× Yarrow boilers; Parsons steam turbines; 3 shafts
- Speed: 26 kn (30 mph; 48 km/h)
- Complement: 39
- Armament: 2 × 12-pounder (76 mm) guns; 3 × 18 inch (450 mm) torpedo tubes

HMS TB 11 (originally named HMS Mayfly) was a Cricket-class coastal destroyer or torpedo-boat of the British Royal Navy. TB 11 was built by the shipbuilder Yarrow from 1905 to 1907. She was used for local patrol duties in the First World War and was sunk by a German mine in the North Sea on 7 March 1916.

== Design ==
The Cricket-class was intended as a smaller and cheaper supplement to the large, fast but expensive Tribal-class, particularly in coastal waters such as the English Channel. An initial order for twelve ships was placed by the Admiralty in May 1905 as part of the 1905–1906 shipbuilding programme, with five ships each ordered from Thornycroft and J. Samuel White and two from Yarrow.

Yarrow's ships (the different shipbuilders built to their own design, although standardised machinery and armament was fitted) were 175 feet 9 inches (53.57 m) long overall and 172 feet 0 inches (52.43 m) between perpendiculars, with a beam of 18 feet 0 inches (5.49 m) and a draught of 5 feet 8 inches (1.73 m). The ships had turtleback (Note: A fore deck with exaggerated camber designed to throw off sea water at high speeds.) forecastles and two funnels. Two oil-fuelled Yarrow water-tube boilers fed steam to three-stage Parsons steam turbines, driving three propeller shafts. The machinery was designed to give 4,000 shaft horsepower (3,000 kW), with a speed of 26 knots (30 mph; 48 km/h) specified.

Armament consisted of two 12-pounder (76-mm) 12 cwt guns (Note: 12 cwt refers to the weight of the gun in hundredweights), and three 18-inch (450 mm) torpedo tubes (in three single mounts). The ships had a crew of 39.

== Service ==
The first of Yarrow's two torpedo-boats of the 1905–1906 programme was laid down as HMS Mayfly at their Poplar, London shipyard on 23 November 1905. In 1906, the ships of the class, including Mayfly, were redesignated as torpedo-boats, losing their names in the process, with Mayfly becoming TB 11. She was launched on 29 January 1907, and reached a speed of 27.16 knots (31.26 mph; 50.30 km/h) during sea trials. She was completed in July 1907.

In August 1910, TB 11 collided with the sea wall at the eastern entrance to Dover harbour when carrying out a practice night torpedo attack, damaging her stem. She was taken into Sheerness dockyard for repair on 3 August. She was refitted at Sheerness in 1911.

In March 1913, TB 11 was based at Chatham, in commission, but with a nucleus crew, (Note: Ships with nucleus crews were permanently manned with two-fifths of the ships' normal complement, consisting of key officers and men (including engineering and gunnery specialists), who would become well acquainted with their ships. The ships could be quickly mobilised by regular Navy personnel drawn from shore barracks and training establishments. This mobilisation was frequently practiced.) and remained at Chatham in July 1914.

The Royal Navy mobilised its reserve forces on the eve of the outbreak of the First World War in August 1914, and in November 1914, TB 11 was listed as part of the Local Defence Flotilla for The Nore, which had the duty of defending the Thames Estuary. The flotilla had a strength of twelve old destroyers and 20 torpedo boats, including twelve ex-Cricket-class vessels.

TB 11 remained part of the Nore Local Defence Flotilla in March 1916. She was sunk by a mine off Longsand Head on the east coast of Britain on 7 March 1916. 23 of her crew was killed. The destroyer Coquette was lost shortly before TB 11 was sunk in the same minefield, which had been laid by the German submarine UC-10 on 6 March.
