= Wight Baby =

Baby
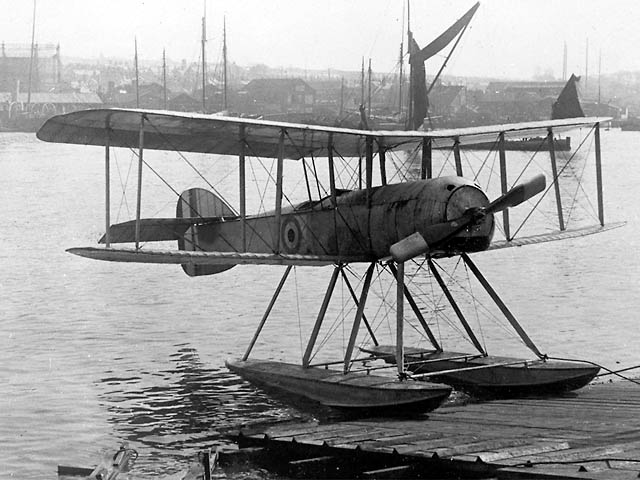

General information
- Type: Seaplane fighter
- Manufacturer: J. Samuel White & Co, Ltd. (Wight Aircraft)
- Designer: Howard T. Wright
- Number built: 3

History
- First flight: 1916

The Wight Baby was a British single-seat seaplane fighter produced by John Samuel White & Company Limited (Wight Aircraft). Only three prototype aircraft were built.

== Design and development ==
Designed by Howard T. Wright and built by the aircraft department of the shipbuilder J. Samuel White & Company Ltd., the Wight Baby was a single-bay biplane with ailerons on the top wings only and a fabric-covered wooden fuselage. It was powered by a 100 hp (75 kW) Gnome Monosoupape rotary engine driving a four-bladed propeller. Three prototypes were constructed (Nos. 9097, 9098 and 9099), and service trials were undertaken at the Seaplane Experimental Station at Felixstowe and also at the Isle of Grain, but the aircraft's performance was not good enough for any further development work or volume production to be carried out.

== Specifications (Baby) ==
Data from British Aeroplanes 1914-18

General characteristics

- Crew: 1
- Length: 26 ft 8 in (8.13 m)
- Wingspan: 30 ft 8 in (9.35 m)
- Height: 9 ft 1 in (2.77 m)
- Wing area: 297 sq ft (27.6 m^{2})
- Empty weight: 1,277 lb (579 kg)
- Gross weight: 1,864 lb (845 kg)
- Powerplant: 1 × Gnome Monosoupape 9 Type B-2 9-cylinder air-cooled rotary piston engine, 100 hp (75 kW)
- Propellers: 2-bladed fixed-pitch propeller

Performance

- Maximum speed: 86.5 mph (139.2 km/h, 75.2 kn) at 6,500 ft (1,981 m)
- Endurance: 2½ hours
- Service ceiling: 9,300 ft (2,800 m)
- Time to altitude:

- 2,000 ft (610 m) in 4 minutes 50 seconds
- 10,000 ft (3,048 m) in 48 minutes 30 seconds

Armament

- Bombs: Possible provision for two 65 lb (30 kg) bombs

== See also ==
Aircraft of comparable role, configuration, and era

- Sopwith Baby
