= HMS Teazer (1895) =

Conflict-class destroyer

History

United Kingdom
- Name: HMS Teazer
- Builder: J. Samuel White, East Cowes, Isle of Wight
- Launched: 9 February 1895
- Fate: Sold for scrapping, 9 July 1912

General characteristics
- Class & type: Conflict-class destroyer
- Displacement: 320 long tons (325 t)
- Length: 200 ft (61 m)
- Propulsion: White-Forster boilers, 4,500 hp (3,356 kW)
- Speed: 27 knots (50 km/h; 31 mph)
- Complement: 53 officers and men
- Armament: 1 × QF 12 pounder 12 cwt naval gun; 2 × torpedo tubes

HMS Teazer was a Conflict-class destroyer built by the White shipyard for the Royal Navy. She was launched on 9 February 1895, and sold for scrapping on 9 July 1912.

== Service history ==
In January 1900 it was announced that Teazer would be commissioned as tender to the torpedo school HMS Vernon at Chatham, but she was on 12 February commissioned as tender to HMS Excellent, gunnery school at Portsmouth. Later the same month, she was damaged by running into a jetty, and relieved from tender duties while receiving repairs. She then took up the position as tender to Vernon, serving as such until early 1901. She served in the Portsmouth instructional flotilla until April 1902, when her crew was transferred to the destroyer Syren, which took her place in the flotilla. Later in 1902, she underwent repairs to re-tube her boilers.

Teazer was sold for scrap on 9 July 1912 for £1820.

== Bibliography ==
- Chesneau, Roger & Kolesnik, Eugene M., eds. (1979). Conway's All The World's Fighting Ships 1860–1905. London: Conway Maritime Press. ISBN 0-85177-133-5.
- Colledge, J. J.; Warlow, Ben (2006) [1969]. Ships of the Royal Navy: The Complete Record of All Fighting Ships of the Royal Navy from the 15th Century to the Present (3rd Rev ed.). London: Chatham Publishing. ISBN 978-1-86176-281-8. OCLC 67375475.
- Friedman, Norman (2009). British Destroyers: From Earliest Days to the Second World War. Barnsley, UK: Seaforth Publishing. ISBN 978-1-84832-049-9.
- Gardiner, Robert & Gray, Randal, eds. (1985). Conway's All The World's Fighting Ships 1906–1921. London: Conway Maritime Press. ISBN 0-85177-245-5.
- Lyon, David (2001) [1996]. The First Destroyers. London: Caxton Editions. ISBN 1-84067-364-8.
- Manning, T. D. (1961). The British Destroyer. Putnam & Co. OCLC 6470051.
- March, Edgar J. (1966). British Destroyers: A History of Development, 1892–1953; Drawn by Admiralty Permission From Official Records & Returns, Ships' Covers & Building Plans. London: Seeley Service. OCLC 164893555.
