= Hired armed cutter Spider =

Royal Navy ship

His Majesty's Hired armed cutter Spider served the Royal Navy on contract between 9 July 1803 and 8 December 1804. She had a burthen of 114 1/94 tons (bm) and was armed with ten 12-pounder carronades. She may have been the brig Spider, of 113 tons (bm) and fourteen 12 and 2-pounder guns, that had received a letter of marque on 29 January 1801 under Captain John Friend.

In March 1804, Spider detained two vessels, Maria, Anslack, master, and Atalante, Hennersman, master. They were sailing from Marennes to Konigsberg and Spider sent them into Plymouth.
