= HMS TB 5 (1906) =

History

United Kingdom
- Name: HMS TB 5
- Builder: J. Samuel White, Cowes
- Laid down: 24 January 1906
- Launched: 15 December 1906
- Completed: May 1907
- Fate: Sold 1920

General characteristics
- Class & type: Cricket-class coastal destroyer
- Displacement: 268 long tons (272 t)
- Length: 171 ft 6 in (52.27 m) oa
- Beam: 17 ft 6 in (5.33 m)
- Draught: 6 ft 4 1/2 in (1.943 m)
- Installed power: 3,750 shp (2,800 kW)
- Propulsion: 2× Yarrow boilers; Parsons steam turbines; 3 shafts
- Speed: 26 kn (30 mph; 48 km/h)
- Complement: 39
- Armament: 2 × 12-pounder (76 mm) guns; 3 × 18 inch (450 mm) torpedo tubes

HMS TB 5 (Note: Torpedo Boat No. 5) (originally named HMS Spider) was a Cricket-class coastal destroyer or torpedo-boat of the British Royal Navy. TB 5 was built by the shipbuilder J S White from 1905 to 1907. She was used for local patrol duties in the First World War and survived the war. She was sold for scrap in 1920.

== Design ==
The Cricket-class was intended as a smaller and cheaper supplement to the large, fast, but expensive Tribal-class destroyer, particularly in coastal waters such as the English Channel. An initial order for twelve ships was placed by the Admiralty in May 1905 as part of the 1905–1906 shipbuilding programme, with five ships each ordered from Thornycroft and J. Samuel White and two from Yarrow.

White's ships (the different shipbuilders built to their own design, although standardised machinery and armament was fitted) were 178 feet 0 inches (54.25 m) long overall and 175 feet 0 inches (53.34 m) between perpendiculars, with a beam of 17 feet 6 inches (5.33 m) and a draught of 6 feet 1 1/2 inches (1.867 m). Displacement was 247 long tons (251 t) normal and 272 long tons (276 t) deep load. The ships had turtleback (Note: A fore deck with exaggerated camber designed to throw off sea water at high speeds.) forecastles and two funnels. Two oil-fuelled Yarrow water-tube boilers fed steam to three-stage Parsons steam turbines, driving three propeller shafts. The machinery was designed to give 3,600 shaft horsepower (2,700 kW), with a speed of 26 knots (30 mph; 48 km/h) specified.

Armament consisted of two 12-pounder (76-mm) 12 cwt guns (Note: 12 cwt refers to the weight of the gun in hundredweights), and three 18-inch (450 mm) torpedo tubes (in three single mounts). The ships had a crew of 39.

== Service ==
The fifth of the torpedo-boats ordered from Whites under the 1905–1906 programme was laid down at J. Samuel White's Cowes shipyard on 24 January 1906, was launched on 15 December 1906 and completed in May 1907.

TB 5 was refitted at Sheerness dockyard late in 1912. In April 1913 TB 5 and TB 34 collided and were repaired at Sheerness dockyard.

In 1912, four Patrol Flotillas were formed with torpedo boats and older destroyers, with the duties of preventing enemy minelaying or torpedo attacks on the east coast of Britain. In March 1913, TB 5 was a member of the Eighth Flotilla, based at Chatham, but by July 1914 she had moved to the Seventh Flotilla, based at Devonport. TB 5 was still a member of the Seventh Flotilla at the outbreak of war, when the Flotilla moved to its war station on the east coast of England.

In February 1915 TB 5 was one of four torpedo boats sent to Newhaven to escort stores ships sailing from that port to France. On 23 February, after two merchant ships were sunk by the German submarine U-8 off Beachy Head, TB 5 was sent to join the forces hunting the German submarine. (Note: Other ships involved in the hunt were the destroyers Ghurka, Maori and the torpedo-boat TB 1) Despite the hunt, U-8 torpedoed and sank three more merchant ships on 24 February before returning safely to her base at Ostend. The torpedo-boats proved unsuitable for the weather, but despite this they continued on escort duties, with the Newhaven torpedo boats transferring to the Portsmouth command, where they were used to escort transports from Southampton.

On 3 September 1916, the Danish steamer SS Johan Siem was stopped off Newhaven by a German submarine, with the steamer's crew abandoning ship, but TB 5 came up from Newhaven (Note: Newhaven was a sub-base of Portsmouth) with two trawlers and drove the submarine off and took Johan Siem into Newhaven. On 3 May 1917 the German submarine UB-40 torpedoed and sank the merchant ship SS Clodmore off Newhaven. TB 5 rescued the crew of Clodmore. On 6 June 1917 TB 5 spotted what appeared to be the conning tower of a submarine which dived away. TB 5 attacked with four depth charges bringing up a thick oil slick over a considerable area. The success of the attack was subsequently judged by Naval Intelligence as "Improbable".

== Disposal ==
TB 5 was sold for scrap on 7 October 1920 to Ward of Briton Ferry.
