= Conflict-class destroyer =

Subclass of the A-class destroyers

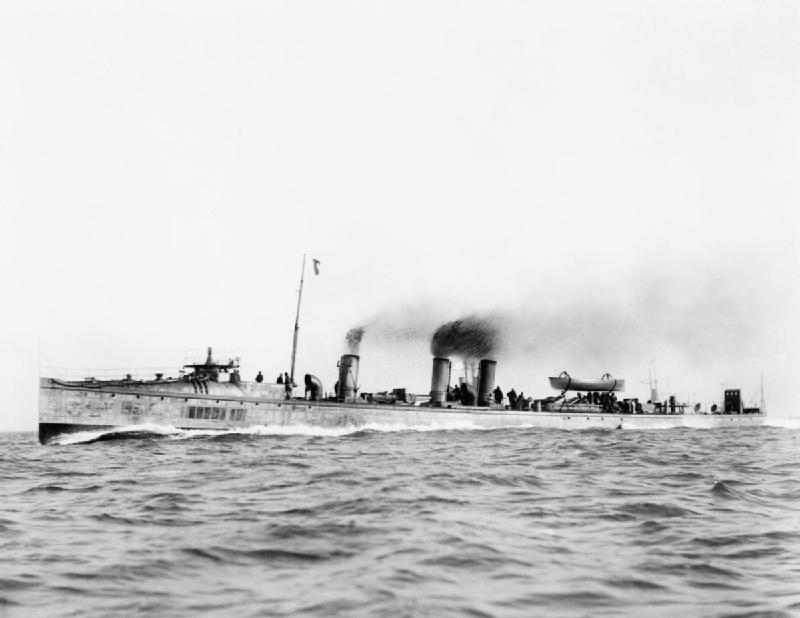
- HMS Conflict

Class overview
- Name: Conflict class
- Builders: J. Samuel White, East Cowes, Isle of Wight
- Operators: Royal Navy
- Preceded by: Fervent class
- Succeeded by: Handy class
- In commission: 1895–1920
- Completed: 3
- Retired: 3

General characteristics
- Type: Destroyer
- Displacement: 320 long tons (325 t)
- Length: 200 ft (61 m)
- Propulsion: White-Forster boilers, 4,500 hp (3,356 kW)
- Speed: 27 knots (50 km/h; 31 mph)
- Complement: 53 officers and men
- Armament: 1 × QF 12 pounder 12 cwt naval gun; 2 × torpedo tubes

Three Conflict-class destroyers served with the Royal Navy. All were built by the White Shipyard.

Under the 1893–1894 Naval Estimates, the British Admiralty placed orders for 36 torpedo-boat destroyers, all to be capable of 27 knots (50 km/h; 31 mph), the "27-knotters", as a follow-on to the six prototype "26-knotters" ordered in the previous 1892–1893 Estimates. As was typical for torpedo craft at the time, the Admiralty left detailed design to the builders, laying down only broad requirements.

Conflict, Teazer, and Wizard were 200 feet (61 m) long, displaced 320 tons and produced 4,500 hp (3,400 kW) from their White-Forster boilers to give them a top speed of 27 knots (50 km/h; 31 mph). They were armed, as was standard with ships of this type at the time, with one twelve pounder gun and two torpedo tubes, and had a complement of 53 officers and men.

In September 1913 the Admiralty re-classed all the surviving 27-knotter destroyers, including Conflict and Wizard (Teazer having been sold for scrap in 1912) as A Class destroyers.

== See also ==
- A-class destroyer (1913)

== Bibliography ==
- Chesneau, Roger & Kolesnik, Eugene M., eds. (1979). Conway's All The World's Fighting Ships 1860–1905. London: Conway Maritime Press. ISBN 0-85177-133-5.
- Colledge, J. J.; Warlow, Ben (2006) [1969]. Ships of the Royal Navy: The Complete Record of All Fighting Ships of the Royal Navy from the 15th Century to the Present (3rd Rev ed.). London: Chatham Publishing. ISBN 978-1-86176-281-8. OCLC 67375475.
- Friedman, Norman (2009). British Destroyers: From Earliest Days to the Second World War. Barnsley, UK: Seaforth Publishing. ISBN 978-1-84832-049-9.
- Gardiner, Robert & Gray, Randal, eds. (1985). Conway's All The World's Fighting Ships 1906–1921. London: Conway Maritime Press. ISBN 0-85177-245-5.
- Lyon, David (2001) [1996]. The First Destroyers. London: Caxton Editions. ISBN 1-84067-364-8.
- Manning, T. D. (1961). The British Destroyer. Putnam & Co. OCLC 6470051.
- March, Edgar J. (1966). British Destroyers: A History of Development, 1892–1953; Drawn by Admiralty Permission From Official Records & Returns, Ships' Covers & Building Plans. London: Seeley Service. OCLC 164893555.
