= HMS Teviot (1903) =

Destroyer of the Royal Navy

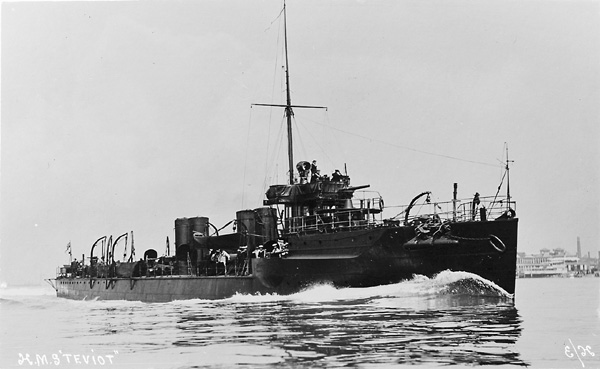
- HMS Teviot

History

United Kingdom
- Name: Teviot
- Ordered: 1902 – 1903 Naval Estimates
- Builder: Yarrows, Poplar
- Laid down: 18 August 1902
- Launched: 7 November 1903
- Commissioned: April 1904
- Out of service: 1919 laid up in reserve awaiting disposal
- Fate: 23 June 1919 sold to Thos. W. Ward of Sheffield for breaking at Morecambe, Lancashire.

General characteristics
- Class & type: Yarrow Type River Class destroyer
- Displacement: 590 long tons (599 t) standard; 660 long tons (671 t) full load; 231 ft 4 in (70.51 m) o/a; 23 ft 6 in (7.16 m) Beam; 7 ft 2.5 in (2.197 m) Draught
- Propulsion: 4 × Yarrow type water tube boiler; 2 × Vertical Triple Expansion (VTE) steam engines driving 2 shafts producing 7,000 shp (5,200 kW) (average)
- Speed: 25.5 kn (47.2 km/h)
- Range: 130 tons coal; 1,620 nmi (3,000 km) at 11 kn (20 km/h)
- Complement: 70 officers and men
- Armament: 1 × QF 12-pounder 12 cwt Mark I, mounting P Mark I; 3 × QF 12-pounder 8 cwt, mounting G Mark I (Added in 1906); 5 × QF 6-pounder 8 cwt (removed in 1906); 2 × single tubes for 18-inch (450mm) torpedoes

Service record
- Part of: East Coast Destroyer Flotilla - 1904; 3rd Destroyer Flotilla – April 1909; 5th Destroyer Flotilla – 1912; Assigned E Class – Aug 1912 – Oct 1913; 9th Destroyer Flotilla – 1914; 1st Destroyer Flotilla – November 1916
- Operations: World War I 1914 - 1918

HMS Teviot was a Yarrow type River Class Destroyer ordered by the Royal Navy under the 1902 – 1903 Naval Estimates. Named after the River Teviot in southern Scotland near the border with England, she was the first ship to carry this name in the Royal Navy. She served during World War 1, primarily on anti-submarine duty in the Channel, and was sold for breaking up in 1919.

== Construction ==
She was laid down on 18 August 1902 at the Yarrow shipyard at Poplar and launched on 7 November 1903. Her build was completed in April 1904. Her original armament was to be the same as the Turleback torpedo boat destroyers that preceded her. In 1906 the Admiralty decided to upgrade the armament by landing the five 6-pounder naval guns and shipping three 12-pounder 8 hundredweight (cwt) guns. Two would be mounted abeam at the foc's'le break and the third gun would be mounted on the quarterdeck.

== Pre-War ==
After commissioning she was assigned to the East Coast Destroyer Flotilla of the 1st Fleet and based at Harwich.

On 7 August 1907 Teviot collided with the destroyer Kestrel, badly damaging Kestrel, which had her bow cut off in the collision.

In April 1909 she was assigned to the 3rd Destroyer Flotilla of the 1st Fleet on its formation at Harwich. She remained until displaced by a Basilisk Class destroyer by May 1912. She was assigned to the 5th Destroyer Flotilla in the 2nd Fleet with a nucleus crew.

On 30 August 1912 the Admiralty directed all destroyers were to be grouped into classes designated by letters, with the River-class becoming known officially as the E-Class. The class letters were painted on the hull below the bridge area and on one of the funnels.

== World War I ==
In early 1914 after being displaced by G Class destroyers she was assigned to the 9th Destroyer Flotilla based at Chatham tendered to the depot ship St George. The 9th Flotilla was a Patrol Flotilla tasked with anti-submarine and counter mining patrols in the Firth of Forth area. By September 1914, she was deployed to Portsmouth and the Dover Patrol. Here she provided anti-submarine, counter mining patrols and defended the Dover Barrage.

In August 1915 with the amalgamation of the 7th and 9th Flotillas, she was assigned to the 1st Destroyer Flotilla when it was redeployed to Portsmouth in November 1916. She was equipped with depth charges for employment in anti-submarine patrols, escorting of merchant ships and defending the Dover Barrage. In the spring of 1917 as the convoy system was being introduced the 1st Flotilla was employed in convoy escort duties for the English Channel for the remainder of the war.

== Disposition ==
In 1919 she was paid off and laid up in reserve awaiting disposal. On 23 June 1919 she was sold to Thos. W. Ward of Sheffield for breaking at Morecambe, Lancashire.

She was not awarded a Battle Honour for her service

== Pennant Numbers ==
Pennant Number	From	To
N26	6 Dec 1914	1 Sep 1915
D33	1 Sep 1915	1 Jan 1918
D88	1 Jan 1918	23 Jun 1919

== Bibliography ==
- Chesneau, Roger & Kolesnik, Eugene M., eds. (1979). Conway's All The World's Fighting Ships 1860–1905. London: Conway Maritime Press. ISBN 0-85177-133-5.
- Colledge, J. J.; Warlow, Ben (2006) [1969]. Ships of the Royal Navy: The Complete Record of All Fighting Ships of the Royal Navy from the 15th Century to the Present (3rd Rev ed.). London: Chatham Publishing. ISBN 978-1-86176-281-8. OCLC 67375475.
- Dittmar, F.J.; Colledge, J. J. (1972). British Warships 1914–1919. Shepperton, UK: Ian Allan. ISBN 0-7110-0380-7.
- Friedman, Norman (2009). British Destroyers: From Earliest Days to the Second World War. Barnsley, UK: Seaforth Publishing. ISBN 978-1-84832-049-9.
- Gardiner, Robert & Gray, Randal, eds. (1985). Conway's All The World's Fighting Ships 1906–1921. London: Conway Maritime Press. ISBN 0-85177-245-5.
- Manning, T. D. (1961). The British Destroyer. London: Putnam & Co. OCLC 6470051.
- March, Edgar J. (1966). British Destroyers: A History of Development, 1892–1953; Drawn by Admiralty Permission From Official Records & Returns, Ships' Covers & Building Plans. London: Seeley Service. OCLC 164893555.
