= HMS TB 81 (1885) =

History

United Kingdom
- Name: HMS TB81
- Builder: J. Samuel White, Cowes
- Laid down: 1884
- Acquired: 1885
- Fate: Scrapped 1921

General characteristics
- Displacement: 137 long tons (139 t) normal
- Length: 153 ft 8.5 in (46.85 m) o/a
- Beam: 17 ft 6 in (5.33 m)
- Draught: 9 ft 6 in (2.90 m)
- Installed power: 1,300 ihp (970 kW)
- Propulsion: 1 × three-cylinder compound steam engine
- Speed: 23.75 kn (27.33 mph; 43.99 km/h)
- Complement: 25
- Armament: 4× 3-pounder (47 mm) guns; 3 × 14 inch torpedo tubes

HMS TB 81, originally named Swift, was a torpedo boat that served with the British Royal Navy. She was built in 1884–1885 by the shipbuilder J Samuel White as a private venture, and was purchased for the Royal Navy in 1885, and was one of the largest torpedo boats of her time. She remained in service into the First World War, when she was employed as a patrol boat, finally being sold for scrap in 1921.

== Construction and design ==
In 1884, the shipbuilder J. Samuel White began work on a new, torpedo boat, named Swift as a private venture (i.e. without an order from a customer), with Yard number 440.Swift was much larger than contemporary torpedo boats, and was intended to double as a "torpedo-boat catcher", to defend against enemy torpedo-boats, as an early form of torpedo-boat destroyer.

Swift was flush-decked, with a strengthened ram bow for ramming hostile torpedo boats. The ship was 153 feet 8 1/2 inches (46.85 m) long overall, 150 feet (45.72 m) between perpendiculars with a beam of 17 feet 6 inches (5.33 m) and a draught of 9 feet 6 inches (2.90 m). Displacement was 137 long tons (139 t) normal and 166 long tons (169 t) full load.

The ship was powered by a single three-cylinder compound steam engine, rated at 1,300 indicated horsepower (970 kW). This drove a single propeller shaft. Swift reached a speed of 23.79 knots (27.38 mph; 44.06 km/h) during sea trials, which corresponded to a more realistic sea speed of 18 knots (21 mph; 33 km/h) during service use. Tandem rudders were fitted, allowing Swift to be the most manoeuvrable British torpedo boat of the time, despite being the largest, having a turning circle of 225 feet (69 m). Two funnels were fitted, side-by-side, ahead of the ship's conning tower.

She was designed to carry differing armament suites depending on the role she was employed in. For the anti-torpedo boat role, the ship could carry six 3-pounder (47 mm) guns together with a 14-inch torpedo tube in the bow, while for the torpedo boat role, two more torpedo tubes could be carried at the expense of two of the guns. She had a crew of 25.

A war scare with Russia in 1884–1885 led to large orders for new torpedo boats being placed, including 20 from Thornycroft, 22 from Yarrow and 5 from White, with these orders being supplemented by buying two boats building for Chile by Yarrow and buying Swift, which was about to begin trials.

== Service ==
After purchase, the Royal Navy was uncertain whether to complete Swift as a torpedo-boat catcher or as a normal torpedo boat, before deciding to use her as a torpedo boat, and fitting her with the appropriate armament of three torpedo tubes and four guns. She was renamed TB 81 in 1887.

In August 1894 TB 81 took part in that year's Naval Manoeuvres, and in July 1896 again took part in the Manoeuvres, while in 1897 she took place in the Jubilee Fleet Review at Spithead.

On 3 August 1901, during the 1901 Naval Manoeuvres, TB 81 was trying to intercept the prototype turbine-powered destroyer Viper when both ships ran aground on the Renonquet reef off Alderney in the Channel Islands. While TB 81 was refloated and repaired, Viper was wrecked. TB 81 was reboilered in 1905. In April 1913, TB 81 was in commission with a nucleus crew at Portsmouth.

TB 81 served as a patrol boat during the First World War, operating out of Portsmouth and Portland, and being fitted with hydrophones and depth charges. On 15 May 1917, TB 81 was directed by a seaplane towards a submarine which the aircraft had spotted and attacked in the English Channel. TB 81 detected a possible submarine contact on her hydrophone, and waited until a submarine (possibly UB-36 or UB-20) surfaced. TB 81 gave chase, and the submarine dived. The torpedo boat dropped a depth-charge and brought up a patch of oil. The attack was credited as a "possible" success by naval intelligence.

TB 81 was paid off in 1919 and was sold for scrap to J. E. Thomas of Newport on 22 October 1921.
