= Cricket-class destroyer =

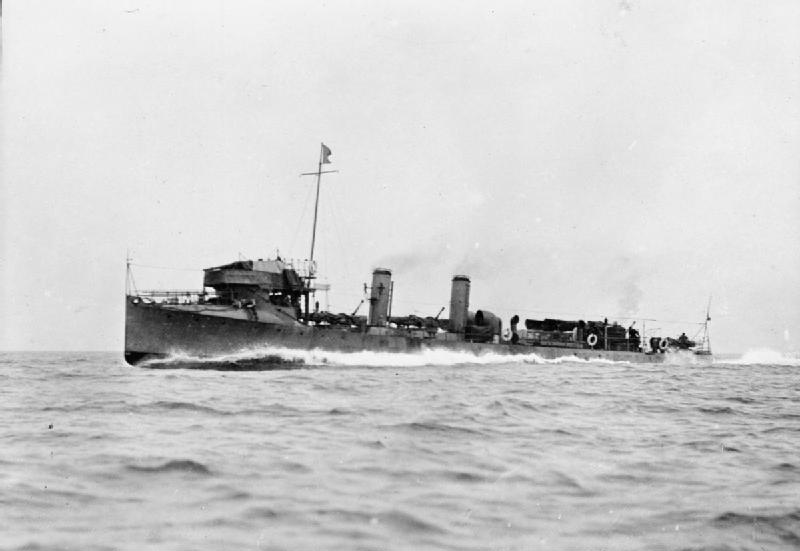
- HMS Cricket

Class overview
- Name: Cricket class and subsequent classes
- Builders: J S White, Thornycroft, Yarrow, Denny, Hawthorn Leslie, Palmer
- Operators: Royal Navy
- Completed: 36
- Lost: 6
- Scrapped: 30

The Cricket class and following classes of coastal destroyers were a series of small torpedo boat destroyers (TBDs) intended to complement the Royal Navy's Tribal-class destroyers. The thirty-six vessels which broadly comprised this group actually consisted of several distinct classes, as each contractor built to their own designs, and even single contractor's designs evolved from year to year.

The first twelve vessels (comprising White's Cricket class, Thornycroft's Gadfly class and Yarrow's Mayfly class) were ordered in 1905 and launched in early 1906. In practice they were not strong enough for open ocean operations and were reclassified as 1st class torpedo boats. These first twelve had been given names but in October 1906 - after the first two vessels ran trials but before any had been delivered - all were then given the numbers TB 1 to TB 12 and their names were withdrawn.

The following two batches—each of twelve more boats, comprising TB 13 to TB 24 ordered under the 1906–07 Programme, and TB 25 to TB 36 under the 1907–08 Programme—were only ever given numbers and were on average 10 ft (3.0 m) longer. These were only ever classified as 1st class torpedo boats. The last boat was launched in 1909. Those that survived the war (six were wartime losses - four from the 1905-06 batch and two from the 1906-07 batch) were sold off from 1919 to 1921.

They were built by six different yards (thirteen by White at Cowes, nine by Thornycroft (five at Chiswick and four at Woolston, Hampshire), four each by Denny at Dumbarton and by Hawthorn Leslie at Hebburn, and three each by Yarrow at Cubitt Town and by Palmers at Jarrow).

The boats differed in detail as each shipbuilder was allowed to construct to their own design, and the designs were modified and enlarged for the later batches, but all had two funnels with one of the torpedo tubes on the stern. These vessels closely resembled the earliest 26-knotter TBDs of 1892–93, having 'turtle-back' forecastles and carried a similar armament.

By 1914 all boats were serving in North Sea Patrol Flotillas or the Nore Local Defence Flotilla. TB 4 and TB 24 won the Battle Honour Belgian Coast 1915. In 1918 the four Denny-built boats were sent to the Mediterranean: TB 17 and TB 18 served at Gibraltar, TB 29 and TB 30 at Malta, where these went to the breakers in 1919.

== Cricket-class (TB.1 to TB.5 - J. S. White 1905–1906 programme) ==
General characteristics TB.1 to TB.5
- Type: Coastal destroyer (from October 1906, 1st class torpedo boats)
- Displacement: 247 t normal; ~272 t deep load
- Length: 178 ft (54 m) overall, 175 ft (53 m) between perpendiculars
- Beam: 17 ft 6 in (5.33 m)
- Draught: 6 ft 1.5 in (1.867 m)
- Propulsion: 2 Yarrow boilers, 3 Parsons turbines generating 3,600 shp (2,700 kW) on three shafts
- Speed: 26 knots (48 km/h; 30 mph)
- Range: 21.7–37 t of oil
- Complement: 39
- Armament: 2 × 12-pounder guns; 3 × 18-inch torpedo tubes

J Samuel White's torpedo boats of the 1905–1906 shipbuilding programme were 178 feet 0 inches (54.25 m) long overall and 175 feet 0 inches (53.34 m) between perpendiculars, with a beam of 17 feet 6 inches (5.33 m) and a draught of 6 feet 1 1/2 inches (1.867 m). Displacement was 247 long tons (251 t) normal and 272 long tons (276 t) deep load. The ships had turtleback (Note: A fore deck with exaggerated camber designed to throw off sea water at high speeds.) forecastles and two funnels. Two oil-fuelled Yarrow water-tube boilers fed steam to three-stage Parsons steam turbines, driving three propeller shafts. The machinery was designed to give 3,600 shaft horsepower (2,700 kW), with a speed of 26 knots (30 mph; 48 km/h) specified.

Armament consisted of two 12-pounder (76-mm) 12 cwt guns (Note: 12 cwt refers to the weight of the gun in hundredweights), and three 18-inch (450 mm) torpedo tubes (in three single mounts). The ships had a crew of 39.

Original Name	Number	Builder	Laid down	Launched	Completion	Fate
1905–1906 Programme
Cricket	TB 1	J. Samuel White	12 September 1905	23 January 1906	December 1906	Sold 7 October 1920 to Fowey Coaling & Ship Co.
Dragonfly	TB 2	J. Samuel White	15 September 1905	11 March 1906	January 1907	Sold 7 October 1920 to Thos. W. Ward
Firefly	TB 3	J. Samuel White	18 September 1905	1 September 1906	February 1907	Sold 7 October 1920 to Thos. W. Ward
Sandfly	TB 4	J. Samuel White	18 September 1905	30 October 1906	April 1907	Sold 7 October 1920 to Thos. W. Ward; Wrecked 11 January 1921 on way to scrapping
Spider	TB 5	J. Samuel White	18 September 1905	15 December 1906	1907	Sold for scrapping 7 October 1920 to Thos. W. Ward.

== Gadfly-class (TB.6 to TB.10 - Thornycroft boats - 1905–1906 programme) ==
General characteristics TB.6 to TB.10
- Type: Coastal destroyer (from October 1906, 1st Class torpedo boats)
- Displacement: 244 t normal; ~268 t deep load
- Length: 171 ft 6 in (52.27 m) overall, 166 ft 6 in (50.75 m) between perpendiculars
- Beam: 17 ft 6 in (5.33 m)
- Draught: 6 ft 4.5 in (1.943 m)
- Propulsion: 2 Yarrow boilers, 3 Parsons turbines generating 3,750 shp (2,800 kW) on three shafts
- Speed: 26 knots (48 km/h; 30 mph)
- Range: 21–35.6 t of oil
- Complement: 39
- Armament: 2 × 12-pounder guns; 3 × 18-inch torpedo tubes

Thornycroft's torpedo boats under the 1905–1906 programme were 171 feet 6 inches (52.27 m) long overall and 166 feet 6 inches (50.75 m) between perpendiculars, with a beam of 17 feet 6 inches (5.33 m) and a draught of 6 feet 4 1/2 inches (1.943 m). Displacement was 244 long tons (248 t) normal and 268 long tons (272 t) deep load. As for the White-built boats, they had turtleback forecastles and two funnels. The machinery was similar, but was rated at 3,750 shaft horsepower (2,800 kW), with a speed of 26 knots (30 mph; 48 km/h) specified. The ship's armament and crew was as the White-designed ships.

Original Name	Number	Builder	Laid down	Launched	Completion	Fate
1905–1906 Programme
Gadfly	TB 6	Thornycroft, Chiswick	1 September 1905	24 June 1906	December 1906	Sold 22 October 1920 to Stanlee, Dover
Glowworm	TB 7	Thornycroft, Chiswick	25 September 1905	20 December 1906	February 1907	Sold 9 May 1921 to Thos. W. Ward, Rainham
Gnat	TB 8	Thornycroft, Chiswick	4 October 1905	1 December 1906	March 1907	Sold 9 May 1921 to Thos. W. Ward, Rainham
Grasshopper	TB 9	Thornycroft, Chiswick	1 November 1905	18 March 1907	June 1907	Sank following collision in North Sea, 26 July 1916
Greenfly	TB 10	Thornycroft, Chiswick	2 November 1905	15 February 1907	May 1907	Mined in North Sea, 10 June 1915

== Mayfly Class (TB.11 to TB.12) ==
General characteristics TB.11 and TB.12
- Type: Coastal destroyer (from October 1906, 1st Class torpedo boats)
- Displacement: 264 t normal; ~291 t deep load
- Length: 175 ft 9 in (53.57 m) overall, 172 ft 0 in (52.43 m) between perpendiculars
- Beam: 18 ft 0 in (5.49 m)
- Draught: 5 ft 8 in (1.73 m) (trials)
- Propulsion: 2 Yarrow boilers, 3 Parsons turbines generating 4,000 shp (3,000 kW) on three shafts
- Speed: 26 knots (48 km/h; 30 mph) (trials)
- Range: 23.8–39.5 t of oil
- Complement: 39
- Armament: 2 × 12-pounder guns; 3 × 18-inch torpedo tubes

Original Name	Number	Builder	Laid down	Launched	Completion	Fate
1905–1906 Programme
Mayfly	TB 11	Yarrow	23 November 1905	29 January 1907	May 1907	Mined in North Sea, 17 March 1916
Moth	TB 12	Yarrow	23 November 1905	15 March 1907	May 1907	Mined in North Sea, 10 June 1915

== TB.13 Class (TB.13 to TB.16) ==
General characteristics TB.13 to TB.36 (average of six builders' designs)
- Type: 1st class torpedo boats
- Displacement: 256 t normal; ~306 t deep load
- Length: 185 ft (56 m) overall, 177 ft (54 m) between perpendiculars
- Beam: 18 ft 0 in (5.49 m)
- Draught: 6 ft 6 in (1.98 m)
- Propulsion: 2 Yarrow boilers, 3 Parsons turbines generating 4,000 shp (3,000 kW) on three shafts
- Speed: 26 knots (48 km/h; 30 mph)
- Complement: 39
- Armament: 2 × 12-pounder guns; 3 × 18-inch torpedo tubes
- Notes: built by six different builders

Number	Builder	Laid down	Launched	Completion	Fate
1906–1907 Programme
TB 13	J. Samuel White	14 March 1907	10 July 1907	May 1908	Sank following collision in North Sea, 26 January 1916
TB 14	J. Samuel White	18 March 1907	26 September 1907	May 1908	Sold 7 October 1920 to Philip, Dartmouth
TB 15	J. Samuel White	20 March 1907	19 November 1907	May 1908	Sold 7 October 1920 to Thos. W. Ward
TB 16	J. Samuel White	12 July 1907	23 December 1907	July 1908	Sold 7 October 1920 to Thos. W. Ward
TB 17	Denny	4 April 1907	21 December 1907	April 1908	Sold 1919 at Gibraltar
TB 18	Denny	4 April 1907	15 February 1908	June 1908	Sold 1920 at Gibraltar
TB 19	Thornycroft, Woolston	13 March 1907	7 December 1907	2 June 1908	Sold 9 May 1921 to Thos. W. Ward, Grays
TB 20	Thornycroft, Woolston	20 March 1907	21 January 1908	19 August 1908	Sold 9 May 1921 to Thos. W. Ward
TB 21	Hawthorn	7 May 1907	20 December 1907	March 1908	Sold 7 October 1920 to Maden & McKee
TB 22	Hawthorn	7 May 1907	1 February 1908	March 1908	Sold 7 October 1920 to Maden & McKee
TB 23	Yarrow	10 February 1907	5 December 1907	19 February 1908	Sold 9 May 1921 to Thos. W. Ward
TB 24	Palmers	2 April 1907	19 March 1908	June 1908	Wrecked off Dover, 28 January 1917
1907–1908 Programme
TB 25	J. Samuel White	30 December 1907	28 August 1908	22 January 1909	Sold 9 May 1921 to Thos. W. Ward, Grays
TB 26	J. Samuel White	30 December 1907	28 August 1908	February 1909	Sold 9 May 1921 to Thos. W. Ward, Rainham
TB 27	J. Samuel White	2 February 1908	29 September 1908	March 1909	Sold 9 May 1921 to Thos. W. Ward, Rainham
TB 28	J. Samuel White	27 February 1908	29 October 1908	8 April 1909	Sold 9 May 1921 to Thos. W. Ward, Rainham
TB 29	Denny	20 February 1908	29 September 1908	November 1909	Sold 28 November 1919 at Malta
TB 30	Denny	20 February 1908	29 September 1908	January 1910	Sold 28 November 1919 at Malta
TB 31	Thornycroft, Woolston	8 February 1908	10 October 1908	February 1910	Sold 9 May 1921 to Thos. W. Ward, Rainham
TB 32	Thornycroft, Woolston	9 February 1908	23 November 1908	March 1910	Sold 9 May 1921 to Thos. W. Ward, Rainham
TB 33	Hawthorn	17 January 1908	22 February 1909	June 1910	Sold 24 August 1922 to Cashmore, Newport
TB 34	Hawthorn	7 February 1908	22 February 1909	August 1910	Sold 9 May 1921 to Thos. W. Ward, Rainham
TB 35	Palmers	4 February 1908	19 April 1909	August 1910	Sold 24 August 1922 to Cashmore, Newport
TB 36	Palmers	20 March 1908	6 May 1909	September 1910	Sold 9 May 1921 to Thos. W. Ward, Rainham
