= J. Samuel White =

British shipbuilders

- Company type: Private company
- Industry: Shipbuilding
- Founded: 1763 (roots); 1815 (official)
- Defunct: 1981
- Headquarters: Cowes, Isle of Wight

J. Samuel White was a British shipbuilding firm based in Cowes, taking its name from John Samuel White (1838–1915).

It came to prominence during the Victorian era. During the 20th century it built destroyers and other naval craft for both the Royal Navy and export customers; they also built lifeboats and various types of commercial vessels.

There was another 'White's engineers and shipyard' of Cowes, that of William White & Sons (1883 - 1929); the use of the term 'White's of Cowes' may lead to confusion.

== History ==
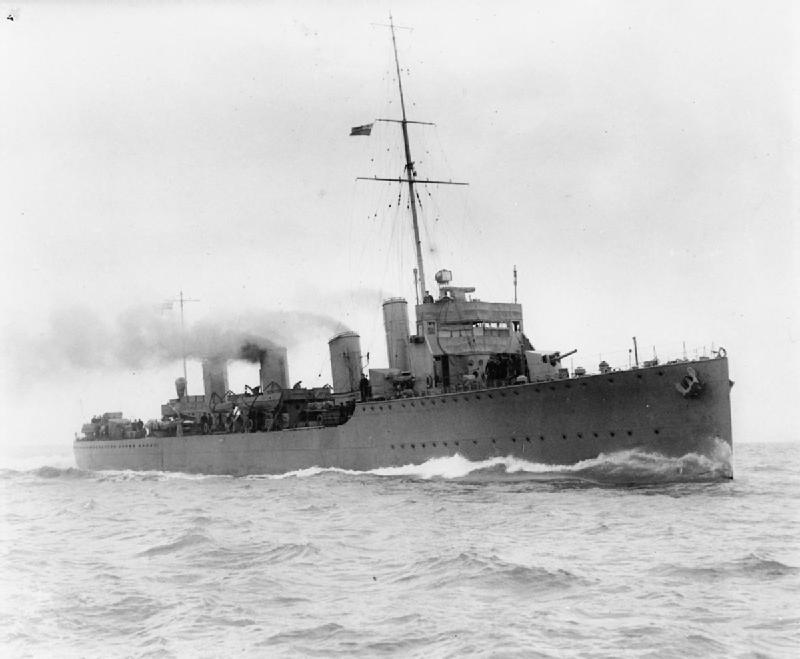
Faulknor-class flotilla leader, built for Chile, as the British HMS Botha

The family had a long tradition of shipbuilding in Kent, with James White constructing the cutter Lapwing for the Royal Navy at Broadstairs in 1763–1764, as well as fast vessels for the Revenue services and fishing smacks, and even a number of West Indiamen. At least three generations of the White family business undertook shipbuilding before Thomas White, (1773–1859) the grandfather of John Samuel White, moved from Broadstairs, to East Cowes on the northern coast of the Isle of Wight in 1802, where he acquired the shipbuilding site on the east bank of the River Medina where there was already more than a century of shipbuilding tradition. In the closing years of the Napoleonic War he began work on what would become the 'Thetis' Yard across the river on the West bank on the 'salterns' and marsh between the Medina and Arctic roads. It opened officially on 1 October 1815. J. S. White subsequently rebuilt the east bank site which in 1825 became the Falcon Yard.

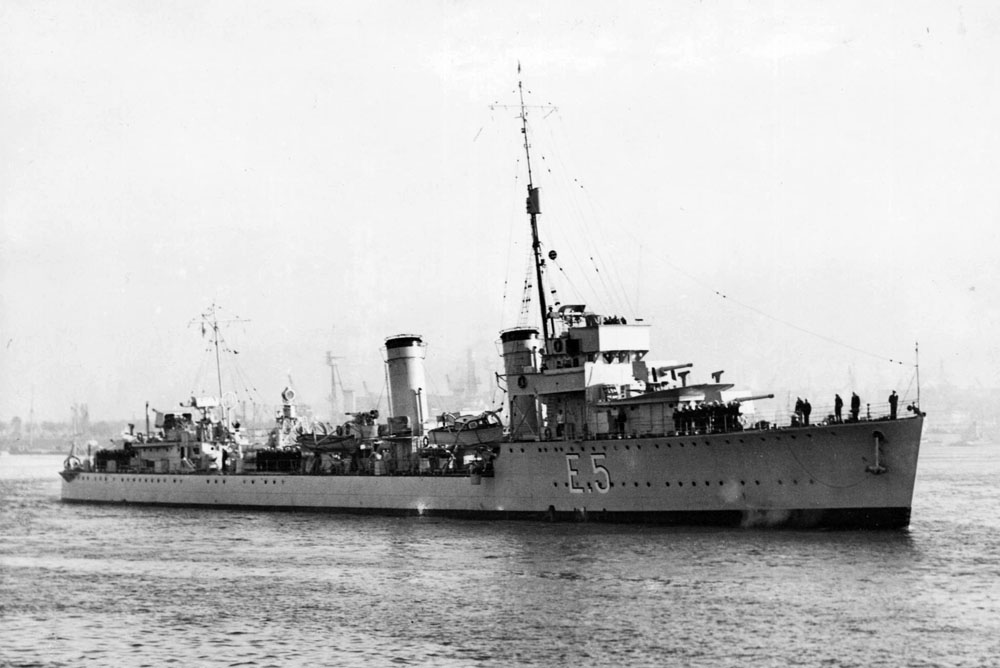
Argentine destroyer Tucumán

Records indicate that by the 1850s J. S. White's docks with its steam sawmills and engine shops, and the mast and block shops, provided work for around 500 craftsmen. J Samuel White expanded still further in 1899. It rapidly became a world leader in the design and construction of small- to medium-sized naval and merchant ships, and also built numerous smaller craft, including more than 130 lifeboats for the RNLI, more than any other builder.

Sir Barnes Wallis, later famous as an aeronautical engineer, worked as a draughtsman for the company at the start of his career, before moving to Vickers to design airships.

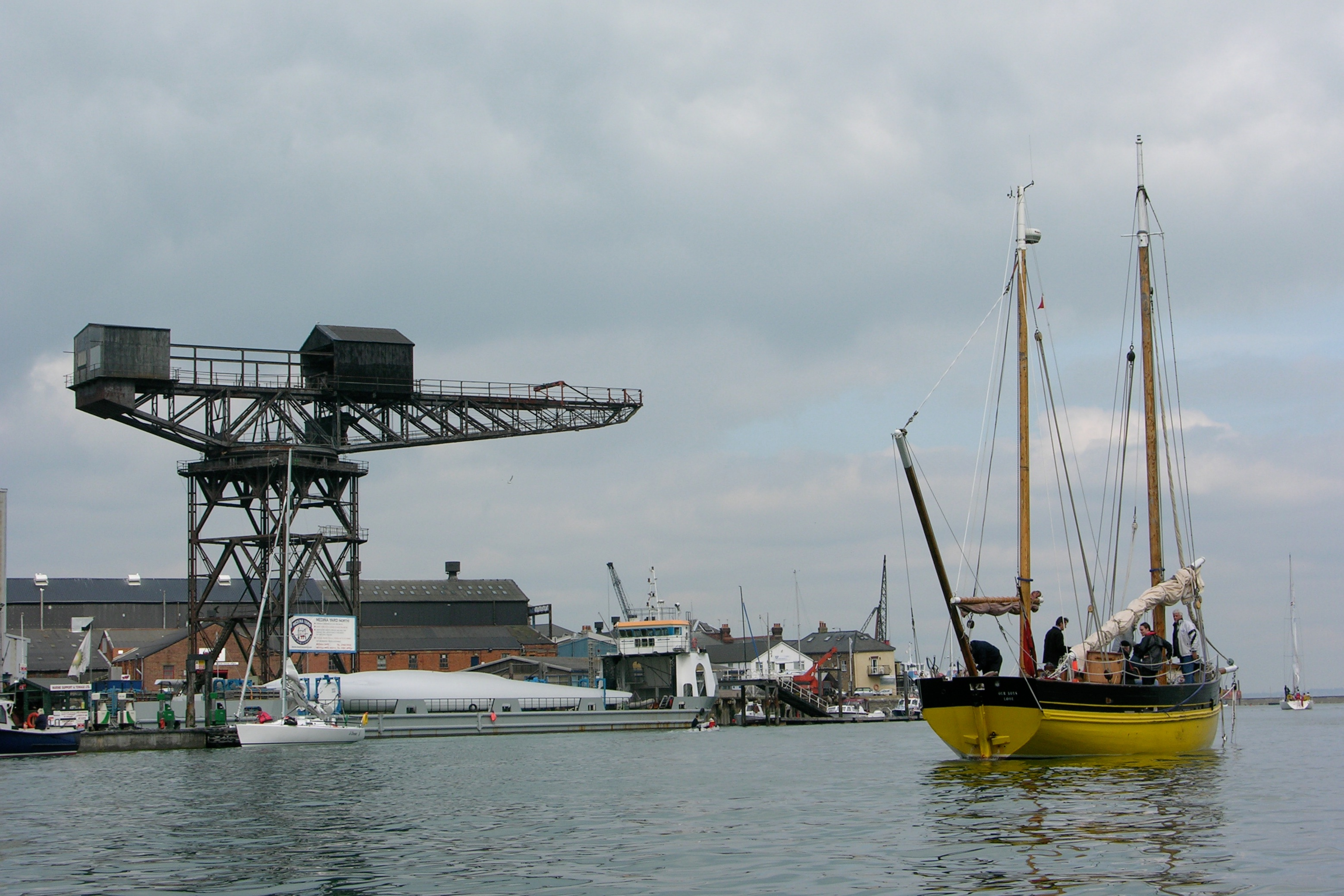
The hammerhead crane

An expansion of the yard in 1911 led to the purchase of a large 80 ton hammerhead crane from Babcock & Wilcox of Renfrew, Scotland. The crane was installed in 1912 on the Cowes side of the river and still survives, it was last used in 2004, and now Grade II* listed.

At the height of its shipbuilding activities, J. S. White had shipbuilding slipways on the eastern side of the River Medina at East Cowes and fitting-out quays, engineering works and administration offices at Cowes on the western side of the river.

In 1922 J. S. White established the 'Island Transport Co. Ltd.' with barges running from Southampton, (and initially Portsmouth) to East Cowes to carry supplies for the shipyards. Any spare capacity was used to carry general, commercial cargo. After the shipyards closed in 1965, the trade was just general cargo. The Island Transport company was sold to the Red Funnel Group in 1968.

At some time, J. S. White acquired the Henry Bannister, rope making business of Cowes.

In 1954 J. S. White acquired the shipbuilding business of William Weatherheads at Cockenzie, Scotland. the business was carried on under the name 'William Weatherhead & Sons (1954) Ltd' until 1965 when it was renamed 'J. Samuel White (Scotland) Ltd'.

In 1961 J. S. White acquired the postcard and greeting-card printing business of J. Arthur Dixon with production facilities at Newport, Isle of Wight and at Inverness, Scotland. The company was sold in 1974 to the Dickinson Robinson Group.

With the regular construction of turbines, boilers, steam and diesel engines, the Cowes site became an engineering works.

With the closing of the shipbuilding section in 1965, the works on the East Cowes side of the river were sold to the British Hovercraft Corporation in 1966.

In 1968 the company received a take-over bid for the whole group of companies from the Foreign and Colonial Investment Trust; by December 1968 the take-over was complete - at this time it was reported that there were 1000 people employed over the group.

In 1971 Foreign and Colonial Investment Trust sold the company to Spectrol Holdings, a UK subsidiary of the Carrier Corporation of Syracuse, New York.

By 1979 the company had been renamed Elliott Turbomachinery Ltd and employed almost 850 people; and the American parent company, the Carrier Corporation, was taken over by another American company, United Technologies.

In 1981 the company finally ceased trading and the sites were closed.

"Sammy" White built well over two thousand vessels at their various shipyards at East Cowes between 1803 and their closure in 1963.

== Naval vessels ==
An order in 1911 of six destroyers for the Chilean Navy, these destroyers were fitted with J. S. White's own design of water-tube boiler, the White-Forster boiler. These were similar to contemporary three-drum boiler designs, but had a remarkable number of smaller tubes.

Paul Hyland describes how J. S. White had grown during the succeeding century:

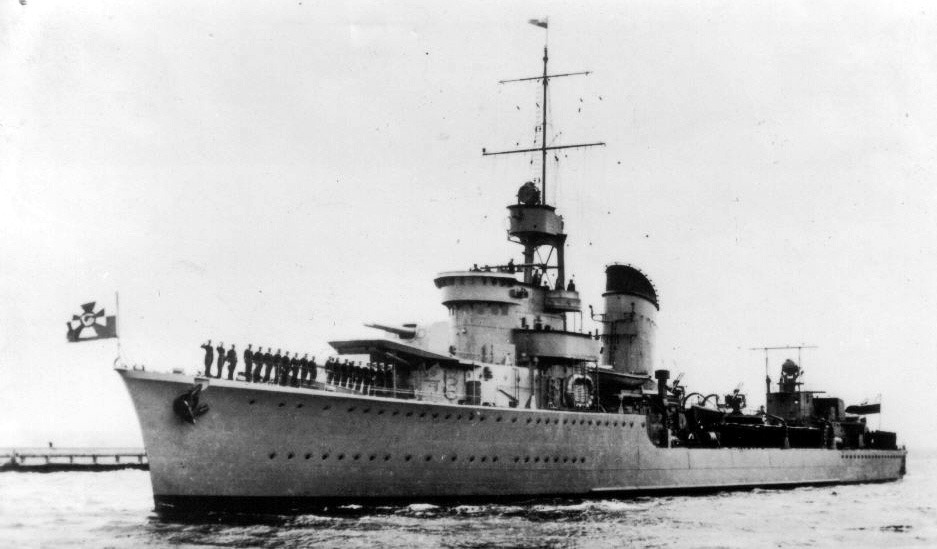
Polish destroyer ORP Grom

In May 1942 the Polish destroyer 'Blyskawica' was being urgently refitted at J Samuel White where it had been launched. On the night of 4 May, the Luftwaffe let fly with 200 tons of bombs, a wave of incendiaries followed by high explosives. The Blyskawica left her moorings, dropped anchor outside the harbour, and retaliated all night with such vehemence that her guns had to be doused with water, and more ammunition had to be ferried across from Portsmouth but for her, the 800 casualties and thousands of damaged buildings, including 100,000 square feet (10,000 m^{2}) of wreckage at J. S. Whites, would have been far worse.

Naval vessels built by J. Samuel White (vessels in some classes also built by other shipbuilders) include (in date order):

- Vigilant-class gun vessel (1856) (J & R White)
- HMS TB81 (1885), torpedo boat
- Conflict-class destroyer (1895)
- TB 114-class torpedo boat (1903-1905)
- River-class destroyer (1905)
- Cricket-class coastal destroyer (1906-1908)
- Tribal-class destroyer (1906-1909)
- Acorn-class destroyer (otherwise, H-class) (1911)
- Acheron-class destroyer (otherwise Admiralty I class) (1911)
- Almirante Lynch-class/Faulknor-class flotilla leader (1912-1914) Originally 6 were ordered for the Chilean Navy, 2 were delivered, the other 4 purchased by the Royal Navy for use during WW1, after WW1 the 3 surviving vessels were passed on to the Chilean Navy.
- Laforey-class destroyer (1913)
- Marksman-class flotilla leader (1915)
- Admiralty M-class destroyer (1915)
- R-class destroyer (1916)
- S-class destroyer (1917)
- V and W-class destroyer (1917)
- HMS E32 Submarine (1917)
- HMS F2 Submarine (1917)
- Landing Craft - J. S. White built a prototype Motor Landing Craft in 1926
- Mendoza-class destroyer ARA Tucumán (1928) - Built for the Argentine Navy.
- Bittern-class sloop escort vessel - (1936)
- Grom-class destroyer (1937) - built for the Polish Navy, ORP Grom and ORP Blyskawica, the latter (the oldest preserved destroyer in the world) currently (2022) a museum ship in Gdynia.
- Egret-class sloop (1938)
- Kingfisher-class sloop (1938)
- J-, K- and N-class destroyer (1939)
- Type I Hunt-class destroyer escort (1939)
- Type II Hunt-class destroyer escort (1939) - 2 were used by the Polish Navy as ORP Kujawiak (L72) and ORP Krakowiak (L115)
- Hunt-class destroyer (1940)
- Q and R-class destroyer (1942)
- British Type III Hunt-class destroyer escort (1943)
- C-class destroyer (1943-1945) - including HMS Cavalier (R73), preserved as a museum ship, currently (2022) at Chatham Historic Dockyard.
- Halcyon-class minesweeper (1942-1944)
- Weapon-class destroyer (1945)
- 75ft Motor Torpedo Boat (date unspecified – 1940’s?)
- Daring-class destroyer (1950)
- Blackwood-class frigate (1952-1957)
- Ham-class minesweeper (1953-1960)
- Rothesay-class frigate (1961) - One built for the Royal Navy, another for the Royal New Zealand Navy
- Leander-class frigate (1965) - HMS Arethusa (F38) - the last ship built for the Royal Navy by J. S. White

== Lifeboat production ==
Over the years, J. S. White's produced lifeboats for the Royal National Lifeboat Institution (RNLI) and other users.

Their production included:

- Barnett-class lifeboats
- Lamb & White-class lifeboats
- Liverpool-class lifeboat
- Norfolk and Suffolk-class lifeboats
- Oakley-class lifeboats
- Ramsgate-class lifeboats
- 35ft 6in Self-righting motor-class lifeboats
- Surf-class lifeboats
- Watson-class lifeboats

== Aircraft production ==
In 1912 the company began constructing aircraft at East Cowes in a "Gridiron Shed" on the bank of the River Medina with Howard T. Wright as general manager and chief designer. Because of its location on the Isle of Wight the company choose the name Wight Aircraft.

Between 1912 and 1916 the company moved its aircraft manufacturing facilities across the river to Cowes and built a number of seaplanes:

- Wight Pusher Seaplane
- Wight Twin
- Wight Seaplane
- Wight Baby
- Wight Bomber
- Wight Converted Seaplane
- Wight Quadruplane
- AD Seaplane Type 1000

In 1913 the company produced a flying boat which was displayed at the London Air Show at Olympia in 1913. The company also manufactured 110 Short Type 184 aircraft designed by Short Brothers.

Through 1916–1917 the company developed the Wight Quadruplane prototype fighter. This aircraft was tested at Martlesham Heath from 1917, and was written off in 1918.

== Commercial vessels ==
J. S. White's built ships for commercial customers, including:

- Lady Forrest pilot boat built in 1903 for the Fremantle Harbour Trust in Western Australia, now preserved by the WA Maritime Museum.
- Crested Eagle, a paddle steamer built in 1925 for the General Steam Navigation Company, later requisitioned and sunk during the Dunkirk evacuation.
- The Massey Shaw a Thames fireboat (1935)
- The Woolwich Ferries, John Benn (1930) and Will Crooks (1930)
- Nore Light Vessel (1931)
- Nos 2 and 3 Cowes Floating Bridges (1925, & 1936)
- No 1 Sandbanks chain ferry (1926)
- Steamships Caesarea (1960) and her sister ship Sarnia (1961), cross channel passenger ferries operating between Weymouth and the Channel Islands.

== Publications ==
- Colledge, J. J.; Warlow, Ben (2006) [1969]. Ships of the Royal Navy: The Complete Record of All Fighting Ships of the Royal Navy from the 15th Century to the Present (3rd Rev ed.). London: Chatham Publishing. ISBN 978-1-86176-281-8. OCLC 67375475.
- David L. Williams, White's of Cowes. Silver Link Publishing, 1993. ISBN 1-85794-011-3.
