= HMS Boyne =

Six ships of the British Royal Navy have been named HMS Boyne after the Battle of the Boyne, 1690.

- HMS Boyne (1692) was an 80-gun second rate. This ship of the line was launched in 1692, rebuilt in 1739 and broken up in 1763. When under the command of Captain Dursley she helped take Gibraltar in 1704.
- HMS Boyne (1766) was a 70-gun third rate launched in 1766 and broken up in 1783.
- HMS Boyne (1790) was a 98-gun second rate launched in 1790. She was the flagship of Vice Admiral John Jervis in 1794. She caught fire and burnt at Spithead on 1 May 1795.
- HMS Boyne (1810) was a 98-gun second rate launched in 1810 and commanded first by Thomas Hastings and later Henry Chads. She was renamed HMS Excellent in 1834 and Queen Charlotte in 1859. Her career ended in 1861.
- HMS Boyne (1904) was a River-class destroyer launched in 1904 and broken up in 1919
- HMS Boyne (1918) was a Mersey-class trawler launched in 1918 and sold in 1946.
