= HMS Derwent (1903) =

Destroyer of the Royal Navy

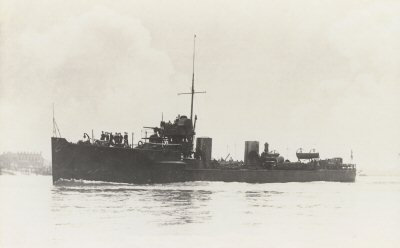
- HMS Derwent

History

United Kingdom
- Name: Derwent
- Ordered: 1901 – 1902 Naval Estimates
- Builder: R.W. Hawthorn Leslie and Company, Ltd, Newcastle-upon-Tyne
- Laid down: 12 June 1902
- Launched: 14 February 1903
- Commissioned: June 1904
- Fate: Mined, 2 May 1917

General characteristics
- Class & type: Hawthorn Leslie Type River Class destroyer
- Displacement: 550 long tons (559 t) standard; 625 long tons (635 t) full load
- Length: 226 ft 6 in (69.04 m) o/a
- Beam: 23 ft 9 in (7.24 m)
- Draught: 7 ft 9 in (2.36 m)
- Installed power: 7,000 shp (5,200 kW)
- Propulsion: 4 × Yarrow type water tube boilers; 2 × vertical triple-expansion steam engines driving 2 shafts
- Speed: 25.5 kn (47.2 km/h)
- Range: 140 tons coal; 1,870 nmi (3,460 km) at 11 kn (20 km/h)
- Complement: 70 officers and men
- Armament: 1 × QF 12-pounder 12 cwt Mark I, mounting P Mark I; 3 × QF 12-pounder 8 cwt, mounting G Mark I (added in 1906); 5 × QF 6-pounder 8 cwt (removed in 1906); 2 × single tubes for 18-inch (450 mm) torpedoes

Service record
- Part of: East Coast Destroyer Flotilla – 1905; 3rd Destroyer Flotilla – Apr 1909; 5th Destroyer Flotilla – 1912; 9th Destroyer Flotilla – 1914; 1st Destroyer Flotilla – Nov 1916
- Operations: World War I 1914–1918

HMS Derwent was a Hawthorn Leslie-type River-class destroyer ordered by the Royal Navy under the 1901 – 1902 Naval Estimates. Named after the River Derwent in central England, she was the second ship to carry this name.

== Construction ==
She was laid down on 12 June 1902 at the Hawthorn Leslie shipyard at Hebburn-on-Tyne and launched on 14 February 1903. She was completed on 1 July 1904. Her original armament was to be the same as the turtleback torpedo boat destroyers that preceded her. In 1906 the Admiralty decided to upgrade the armament by landing the five 6-pounder naval guns and shipping three 12-pounder 8 hundredweight (cwt) guns. Two were mounted abeam at the foc's'le break, and the third gun was mounted on the quarterdeck.

== Pre-War ==
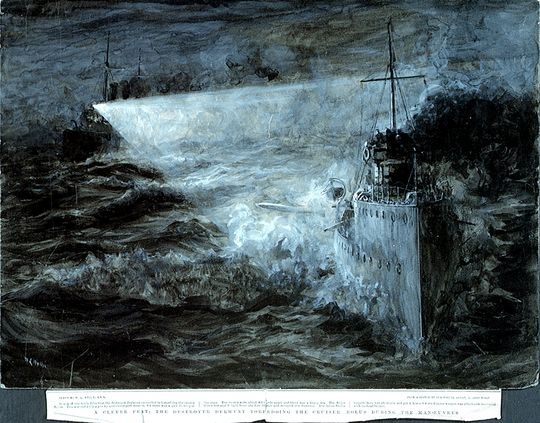
Destroyer Derwent at torpedo practice by W L Wyllie (1904)

After commissioning she was assigned to the East Coast Destroyer Flotilla of the 1st Fleet and based at Harwich.

In April 1909 she was assigned to the 3rd Destroyer Flotilla on its formation at Harwich. She remained until displaced by a Beagle-class destroyer by May 1912. She was assigned to the 5th Destroyer Flotilla of the 2nd Fleet with a nucleus crew.

On 30 August 1912 the Admiralty directed that all destroyer classes were to be designated by letters. The ships of the River class were assigned to the E class. After 30 September 1913, she was known as an E-class destroyer and had the letter ‘E’ painted on the hull below the bridge area and on either the fore or aft funnel.

== World War I ==
In early 1914 when displaced by G-class destroyers she joined the 9th Destroyer Flotilla based at Chatham tendered to HMS St George. The 9th Flotilla was a patrol flotilla operating anti-submarine and counter-mining patrols in the Firth of Forth area. By September 1914, she was deployed to the Dover Patrol based at Portsmouth. Here she provided anti-submarine and counter-mining patrols and defended the Dover Barrage.

In August 1915 with the amalgamation of the 7th and 9th Flotillas, she was assigned to the 1st Destroyer Flotilla when it was redeployed to Portsmouth in November 1916. She was equipped with depth charges for use in anti-submarine patrols, escorting of merchant ships and defending the Dover Barrage. In the spring of 1917 as the convoy system was being introduced the 1st Flotilla was employed in escort duties for convoys through the English Channel for the remainder of the war.

== Loss ==
On 2 May 1917 she struck a contact mine, laid by German submarine UC-26, off Le Havre, France. She sank 2 cables north of Whistle Buoy at position 49°31′N 00°02′W with the loss of 58 officers and men.

== Pennant numbers ==
Pennant number	From	To
N25	6 Dec 1914	1 Sep 1915
D15	1 Sep 1915	18 Jun 1916

== Bibliography ==
- Chesneau, Roger & Kolesnik, Eugene M., eds. (1979). Conway's All The World's Fighting Ships 1860–1905. London: Conway Maritime Press. ISBN 0-85177-133-5.
- Colledge, J. J.; Warlow, Ben (2006) [1969]. Ships of the Royal Navy: The Complete Record of All Fighting Ships of the Royal Navy from the 15th Century to the Present (3rd Rev ed.). London: Chatham Publishing. ISBN 978-1-86176-281-8. OCLC 67375475.
- Dittmar, F.J.; Colledge, J. J. (1972). British Warships 1914–1919. Shepperton, UK: Ian Allan. ISBN 0-7110-0380-7.
- Friedman, Norman (2009). British Destroyers: From Earliest Days to the Second World War. Barnsley, UK: Seaforth Publishing. ISBN 978-1-84832-049-9.
- Gardiner, Robert & Gray, Randal, eds. (1985). Conway's All The World's Fighting Ships 1906–1921. London: Conway Maritime Press. ISBN 0-85177-245-5.
- Manning, T. D. (1961). The British Destroyer. London: Putnam & Co. OCLC 6470051.
- March, Edgar J. (1966). British Destroyers: A History of Development, 1892–1953; Drawn by Admiralty Permission From Official Records & Returns, Ships' Covers & Building Plans. London: Seeley Service. OCLC 164893555.
