= HMS Itchen (1903) =

Destroyer of the Royal Navy

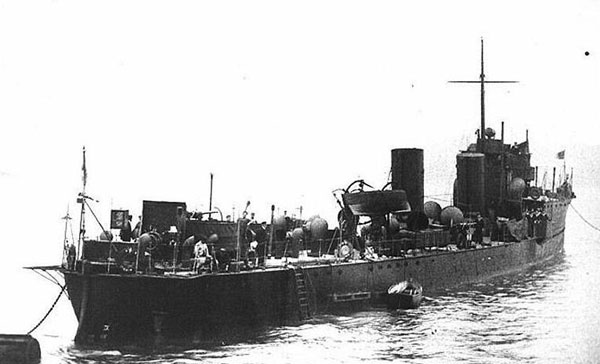
- HMS Itchen in 1904

History

United Kingdom
- Name: Itchen
- Ordered: 1901 – 1902 Naval Estimates
- Builder: Cammell Laird, Birkenhead
- Laid down: 18 August 1902
- Launched: 13 March 1903
- Commissioned: January 1904
- Fate: Torpedoed and sunk 6 July 1917

General characteristics
- Class & type: Laird Type River-class destroyer
- Displacement: 550 long tons (559 t) standard; 625 long tons (635 t) full load
- Length: 226 ft 6 in (69.04 m) o/a
- Beam: 23 ft 9 in (7.24 m)
- Draught: 7 ft 9 in (2.36 m)
- Propulsion: 4 × Yarrow type water tube boiler; 2 × vertical triple expansion (VTE) steam engines driving 2 shafts producing 7,000 shp (5,200 kW) (average)
- Speed: 25.5 kn (47.2 km/h)
- Range: 140 tons coal; 1,870 nmi (3,460 km) at 11 kn (20 km/h)
- Complement: 70 officers and men
- Armament: 1 × QF 12-pounder 12 cwt Mark I, mounting P Mark I; 3 × QF 12-pounder 8 cwt, mounting G Mark I (Added in 1906); 5 × QF 6-pounder 8 cwt (removed in 1906); 2 × single tubes for 18-inch (450 mm) torpedoes

HMS Itchen was a Laird-type River-class destroyer ordered by the Royal Navy under the 1901–1902 Naval Estimates. Named after the River Itchen in southern England near Southampton, she was the first ship to carry this name in the Royal Navy.

== Construction ==
She was laid down on 18 August 1902 at the Cammell Laird shipyard at Birkenhead and launched on 13 March 1903. She was completed in January 1904. Her original armament was to be the same as the turtleback torpedo boat destroyers that preceded her. In 1906 the Admiralty decided to upgrade the armament by landing the five 6-pounder naval guns and shipping three 12-pounder 8 hundredweight (cwt) guns. Two would be mounted abeam at the forecastle break and the third gun would be mounted on the quarterdeck.

== Service history ==
After commissioning Itchen was assigned to the East Coast Destroyer Flotilla of the 1st Fleet and based at Harwich. On 27 April 1908 the Eastern Flotilla departed Harwich for live fire and night manoeuvres. During these exercises HMS Attentive rammed and sank HMS Gala and then damaged HMS Ribble. In April 1909 she was assigned to the 3rd Destroyer Flotilla of the 1st Fleet on its formation at Harwich. Itchen ran aground North-west of Kirkwall on 20 September 1909. She was refloated two days later, and after temporary repairs at Kirkwall before undergoing more permanent repairs at Chatham Dockyard. She remained until displaced by a Basilisk-class destroyer by May 1912. She went into reserve assigned to the 5th Destroyer Flotilla of the 2nd Fleet with a nucleus crew.

On 30 August 1912 the Admiralty directed all destroyer classes were to be designated by alpha characters starting with the letter "A". The ships of the River class were assigned to the E class. After 30 September 1913, she was known as an E-class destroyer and had the letter "E" painted on the hull below the bridge area and on either the fore or aft funnel.

== World War I ==
In early 1914 when displaced by G-class destroyers she joined the 9th Destroyer Flotilla based at Chatham tendered to HMS St George. The 9th Flotilla was a Patrol Flotilla tasked with anti-submarine and counter mining patrols in the Firth of Forth area. By September 1914, she was deployed to the Scapa Flow Local Flotilla. Here she provided anti-submarine and counter mining patrols in defence of the main fleet anchorage.

== Loss ==
On 6 July 1917 Itchen was torpedoed in the North Sea by the German submarine UC-44 70 miles (110 km) north northeast of Peterhead, Scotland, with the loss of eight officers and ratings. She sank at position 58°35′N 00°45′W.

== Pennant numbers ==
| Pennant Number | From | To |
|---|---|---|
| N06 | 6 Dec 1914 | 1 Sep 1915 |
| D22 | 1 Sep 1915 | 6 Jul 1917 |

== Bibliography ==
- Chesneau, Roger & Kolesnik, Eugene M., eds. (1979). Conway's All The World's Fighting Ships 1860–1905. London: Conway Maritime Press. ISBN 0-85177-133-5.
- Colledge, J. J.; Warlow, Ben (2006) [1969]. Ships of the Royal Navy: The Complete Record of All Fighting Ships of the Royal Navy from the 15th Century to the Present (3rd Rev ed.). London: Chatham Publishing. ISBN 978-1-86176-281-8. OCLC 67375475.
- Dittmar, F.J.; Colledge, J. J. (1972). British Warships 1914–1919. Shepperton, UK: Ian Allan. ISBN 0-7110-0380-7.
- Friedman, Norman (2009). British Destroyers: From Earliest Days to the Second World War. Barnsley, UK: Seaforth Publishing. ISBN 978-1-84832-049-9.
- Gardiner, Robert & Gray, Randal, eds. (1985). Conway's All The World's Fighting Ships 1906–1921. London: Conway Maritime Press. ISBN 0-85177-245-5.
- Manning, T. D. (1961). The British Destroyer. London: Putnam & Co. OCLC 6470051.
- March, Edgar J. (1966). British Destroyers: A History of Development, 1892–1953; Drawn by Admiralty Permission From Official Records & Returns, Ships' Covers & Building Plans. London: Seeley Service. OCLC 164893555.
