= HMS Liffey (1904) =

Destroyer of the Royal Navy

History

United Kingdom
- Name: Liffey
- Ordered: 1903 – 1904 Naval Estimates
- Builder: Cammell Laird, Birkenhead
- Laid down: 22 March 1904
- Launched: 23 September 1904
- Commissioned: May 1905
- Out of service: Laid up in reserve 1919
- Fate: 30 August 1919 sold to Thos. W. Ward of Sheffield for breaking at Grays, Essex on the Thames Estuary

General characteristics
- Class & type: Laird Type River Class destroyer
- Displacement: 550 long tons (559 t) standard; 625 long tons (635 t) full load; 226 ft 6 in (69.04 m) o/a; 23 ft 9 in (7.24 m) Beam; 7 ft 9 in (2.36 m) Draught
- Propulsion: 4 × Yarrow type water tube boiler; 2 × Vertical Triple Expansion (VTE) steam engines driving 2 shafts producing 7,000 shp (5,200 kW) (average)
- Speed: 25.5 kn (47.2 km/h)
- Range: 140 tons coal; 1,870 nmi (3,460 km) at 11 kn (20 km/h)
- Complement: 70 officers and men
- Armament: 1 × QF 12-pounder 12 cwt Mark I, mounting P Mark I; 3 × QF 12-pounder 8 cwt, mounting G Mark I (Added in 1906); 5 × QF 6-pounder 8 cwt (removed in 1906); 2 × single tubes for 18-inch (450mm) torpedoes

Service record
- Part of: East Coast Destroyer Flotilla – 1905; 3rd Destroyer Flotilla – Apr 1909; 5th Destroyer Flotilla – 1912; Assigned E Class – Aug 1912 – Oct 1913; 9th Destroyer Flotilla – 1914; 1st Destroyer Flotilla – Nov 1916
- Operations: World War I 1914–1918

HMS Liffey was a Laird-type River-class destroyer ordered by the Royal Navy under the 1903 – 1904 Naval Estimates. Named after the River Liffey flowing through Dublin, she was the third and final ship to carry this name since it was introduced in 1813 for a 50-gun 4th rate sold in 1827.

== Construction ==
She was laid down on 22 March 1904 at the Cammell Laird shipyard at Birkenhead and launched on 23 September 1904. She was completed in May 1905. Her original armament was to be the same as the Turleback torpedo boat destroyers that preceded her. In 1906 the Admiralty decided to upgrade the armament by landing the five 6-pounder naval guns and shipping three 12-pounder 8 hundredweight (cwt) guns. Two would be mounted abeam at the foc's'le break, and the third gun would be mounted on the quarterdeck.

== Pre-War ==
After commissioning she was assigned to the East Coast Destroyer Flotilla of the 1st Fleet and based at Harwich.

On 27 April 1908, the Eastern Flotilla departed Harwich for live fire and night manoeuvres. During these exercises HMS Attentive rammed and sank HMS Gala then damaged HMS Ribble.

In April 1909, she was assigned to the 3rd Destroyer Flotilla of the 1st Fleet on its formation at Harwich. She remained until displaced by a Basilisk Class destroyer by May 1912. She went into reserve assigned to the 5th Destroyer Flotilla of the 2nd Fleet with a nucleus crew.

On 30 August 1912, the Admiralty directed all destroyer classes were to be designated by alpha characters starting with the letter 'A'. The ships of the River Class were assigned to the E Class. After 30 September 1913, she was known as an E Class destroyer and had the letter ‘E’ painted on the hull below the bridge area and on either the fore or aft funnel.

== World War I ==
In early 1914, when displaced by G Class destroyers she joined the 9th Destroyer Flotilla based at Chatham tendered to St George The 9th Flotilla was a patrol flotilla tasked with anti-submarine and countermining patrols in the Firth of Forth area. By September 1914, she had been detached to the Dover Patrol and based at Portsmouth. Here she provided anti-submarine, counter mining patrols and defended the Dover Barrage.

In August 1915, with the amalgamation of the 7th and 9th Flotillas, she was assigned to the 1st Destroyer Flotilla when it was redeployed to Portsmouth in November 1916. She was equipped with depth charges for employment in anti-submarine patrols, escorting of merchant ships and defending the Dover Barrage. In the spring of 1917, as the convoy system was being introduced the 1st Flotilla was employed in convoy escort duties for the English Channel for the remainder of the war.

== Disposition ==
In 1919, Liffey was paid off then laid up in reserve awaiting disposal. On 30 August 1919, she was sold to Thos. W. Ward of Sheffield for breaking at Grays, Essex on the Thames Estuary.

She was not awarded a Battle Honour for her service.

== Pennant Numbers ==
Pennant Number	From	To
N07	6 Dec 1914	1 Sep 1915
D24	1 Sep 1915	1 Jan 1918
D52	1 Jan 1918	13 Sep 1918

== Bibliography ==
- Chesneau, Roger & Kolesnik, Eugene M., eds. (1979). Conway's All The World's Fighting Ships 1860–1905. London: Conway Maritime Press. ISBN 0-85177-133-5.
- Colledge, J. J.; Warlow, Ben (2006) [1969]. Ships of the Royal Navy: The Complete Record of All Fighting Ships of the Royal Navy from the 15th Century to the Present (3rd Rev ed.). London: Chatham Publishing. ISBN 978-1-86176-281-8. OCLC 67375475.
- Dittmar, F.J.; Colledge, J. J. (1972). British Warships 1914–1919. Shepperton, UK: Ian Allan. ISBN 0-7110-0380-7.
- Friedman, Norman (2009). British Destroyers: From Earliest Days to the Second World War. Barnsley, UK: Seaforth Publishing. ISBN 978-1-84832-049-9.
- Gardiner, Robert & Gray, Randal, eds. (1985). Conway's All The World's Fighting Ships 1906–1921. London: Conway Maritime Press. ISBN 0-85177-245-5.
- Manning, T. D. (1961). The British Destroyer. London: Putnam & Co. OCLC 6470051.
- March, Edgar J. (1966). British Destroyers: A History of Development, 1892–1953; Drawn by Admiralty Permission From Official Records & Returns, Ships' Covers & Building Plans. London: Seeley Service. OCLC 164893555.
