= HMS Stour =

Destroyer of the Royal Navy

History

United Kingdom
- Name: Stour
- Builder: Cammell Laird, Birkenhead
- Laid down: 5 December 1904
- Launched: 3 June 1905
- Acquired: 1908 – 1909 Naval Estimates
- Commissioned: December 1909
- Out of service: Laid up in reserve 1919
- Fate: 30 August 1919 sold to J. Smith for breaking

General characteristics
- Class & type: Laird-type River-class destroyer
- Displacement: 550 long tons (559 t) standard; 625 long tons (635 t) full load; 226 ft 6 in (69.04 m) o/a; 23 ft 9 in (7.24 m) Beam; 7 ft 9 in (2.36 m) Draught
- Propulsion: 4 × Yarrow type water tube boiler; 2 × Parsons steam turbines, 7,000 ihp (5,200 kW), 2 shafts
- Speed: 25.5 kn (47.2 km/h)
- Range: 140 tons coal; 1,870 nmi (3,460 km) at 11 kn (20 km/h)
- Complement: 70 officers and men
- Armament: 1 × QF 12-pounder 12 cwt Mark I, mounting P Mark I; 3 × QF 12-pounder 8 cwt, mounting G Mark I; 2 × single tubes for 18-inch (450mm) torpedoes

Service record
- Part of: 3rd Destroyer Flotilla - Apr 1909; 5th Destroyer Flotilla - 1912; Assigned E Class - Aug 1912 - Oct 1913; 9th Destroyer Flotilla - 1914; 7th Destroyer Flotilla - Aug 1915
- Operations: World War I 1914 - 1918

HMS Stour was a Laird-type River-class destroyer purchased by the Royal Navy under the 1908 – 1909 Naval Estimates in December 1909. Named after the River Stour in West Central England near the city of Birmingham, she was the first ship to carry this name in the Royal Navy.

== Construction ==
Built on speculation, she was laid down on 5 December 1904 at the Cammell Laird shipyard at Birkenhead and launched on 3 June 1905. She was purchased and completed in December 1909.

== Pre-War ==
Upon commissioning she was assigned to the 3rd Destroyer Flotilla of the 1st Fleet based at Harwich. She remained until displaced by a Basilisk-class destroyer by May 1912. She went into reserve assigned to the 5th Destroyer Flotilla of the 2nd Fleet with a nucleus crew.

On 30 August 1912 the Admiralty directed all destroyer classes were to be designated by alpha characters starting with the letter 'A'. The ships of the River class were assigned to the E class. After 30 September 1913, she was known as an E-class destroyer and had the letter ‘E’ painted on the hull below the bridge area and on either the fore or aft funnel.

== World War I ==
In early 1914 when displaced by G-class destroyers she joined the 9th Destroyer Flotilla based at Chatham tendered to HMS St George. The 9th Flotilla was a patrol flotilla tasked with anti-submarine and counter-mining patrols in the Firth of Forth area.

In August 1915 with the amalgamation of the 9th and 7th Flotillas she was deployed to the 7th Destroyer Flotilla based at the River Humber. She remained employed on the Humber Patrol participating in counter-mining operations and anti-submarine patrols for the remainder of the war.

== Disposition ==
In 1919 Stour was paid off and laid up in reserve awaiting disposal. On 30 August 1919 she was sold to J. Smith for breaking.

== Pennant numbers ==
Pennant number	From	To
unk	6 Dec 1914	1 Sep 1915
unk	1 Sep 1915	1 Jan 1918
D80	1 Jan 1918	13 Sep 1918
H83	13 Sep 1918	30 Aug 1919

== Bibliography ==
- Colledge, J. J.; Warlow, Ben (2006) [1969]. Ships of the Royal Navy: The Complete Record of All Fighting Ships of the Royal Navy from the 15th Century to the Present (3rd Rev ed.). London: Chatham Publishing. ISBN 978-1-86176-281-8. OCLC 67375475.
- Dittmar, F.J.; Colledge, J. J. (1972). British Warships 1914–1919. Shepperton, UK: Ian Allan. ISBN 0-7110-0380-7.
- Friedman, Norman (2009). British Destroyers: From Earliest Days to the Second World War. Barnsley, UK: Seaforth Publishing. ISBN 978-1-84832-049-9.
- Gardiner, Robert & Gray, Randal, eds. (1985). Conway's All The World's Fighting Ships 1906–1921. London: Conway Maritime Press. ISBN 0-85177-245-5.
- Manning, T. D. (1961). The British Destroyer. London: Putnam & Co. OCLC 6470051.
- March, Edgar J. (1966). British Destroyers: A History of Development, 1892–1953; Drawn by Admiralty Permission From Official Records & Returns, Ships' Covers & Building Plans. London: Seeley Service. OCLC 164893555.
