= HMS Kale (1904) =

Destroyer of the Royal Navy

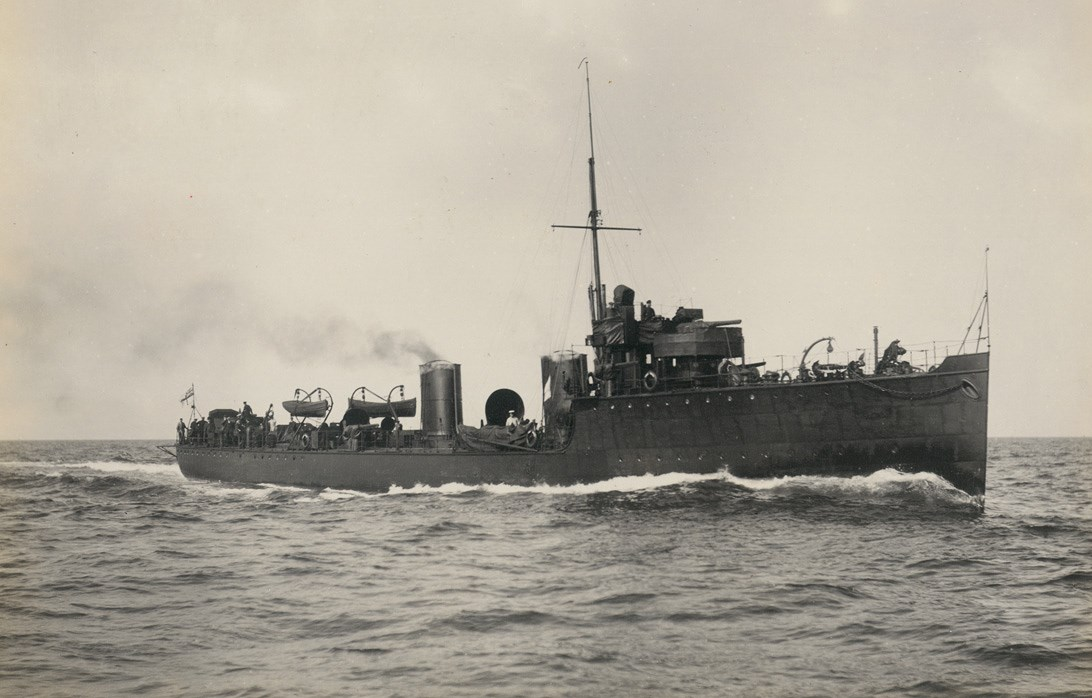

History

United Kingdom
- Name: HMS Kale
- Ordered: 1903 – 1904 Naval Estimates
- Builder: R.W. Hawthorn Leslie and Company, Ltd, Newcastle-upon-Tyne
- Laid down: 16 February 1904
- Launched: 8 November 1904
- Commissioned: August 1905
- Fate: Mined in the North Sea, 27 March 1918

General characteristics
- Class & type: Hawthorn Leslie Type River-class destroyer
- Displacement: 550 long tons (559 t) standard; 625 long tons (635 t) full load; 226 ft 6 in (69.04 m) o/a; 23 ft 9 in (7.24 m) beam; 7 ft 9 in (2.36 m) draught
- Installed power: 7,000 shp (5,200 kW) (average)
- Propulsion: 4 × Yarrow type water tube boilers; 2 × vertical triple-expansion steam engines; 2 × shafts
- Speed: 25.5 kn (47.2 km/h)
- Range: 140 tons coal; 1,870 nmi (3,460 km) at 11 kn (20 km/h)
- Complement: 70 officers and men
- Armament: 1 × QF 12-pounder 12 cwt Mark I, mounting P Mark I; 3 × QF 12-pounder 8 cwt, mounting G Mark I (added in 1906); 5 × QF 6-pounder 8 cwt (removed in 1906); 2 × single tubes for 18-inch (450mm) torpedoes

Service record
- Part of: East Coast Destroyer Flotilla - 1905; 3rd Destroyer Flotilla - Apr 1909; 5th Destroyer Flotilla - 1912; Assigned E class - Aug 1912 - Oct 1913; 9th Destroyer Flotilla - 1914; 7th Destroyer Flotilla - Aug 1915
- Operations: World War I 1914 - 1918

HMS Kale was a Hawthorn Leslie type River-class destroyer ordered by the Royal Navy under the 1903–1904 Naval Estimates. Named after the Kale Water in the Scottish Borders, she was the first ship to carry this name in the Royal Navy.

== Construction ==
She was laid down on 16 February 1904 at the Hawthorn Leslie shipyard at Hebburn-on-Tyne and launched on 8 November 1904. She was completed in August 1905. Her original armament was to be the same as the turtleback torpedo boat destroyers that preceded her. In 1906 the Admiralty decided to upgrade the armament by landing the five 6-pounder naval guns and shipping three 12-pounder 8 hundredweight (cwt) guns. Two would be mounted abeam at the fo'csle break and the third gun would be mounted on the quarterdeck.

== Pre-War ==
After commissioning she was assigned to the East Coast Destroyer Flotilla of the 1st Fleet and based at Harwich.

On 27 April 1908 the Eastern Flotilla departed Harwich for live fire and night manoeuvres. During these exercises HMS Attentive rammed and sank HMS Gala then damaged HMS Ribble.

In April 1909 she was assigned to the 3rd Destroyer Flotilla on its formation at Harwich. She remained until displaced by a Basilisk-class destroyer by May 1912. She was assigned to the 5th Destroyer Flotilla of the 2nd Fleet with a nucleus crew.

On 30 August 1912 the Admiralty directed all destroyer classes were to be designated by alpha characters starting with the letter 'A'. The ships of the River class were assigned to the E class. After 30 September 1913, she was known as an E-class destroyer and had the letter ‘E’ painted on the hull below the bridge area and on either the fore or aft funnel.

In October 1912 Kale, still part of the 5th Flotilla, entered refit at Chatham Dockyard. The refit was finished by December that year, with Kale rejoining the 5th Flotilla. By February 1913, however, Kale was part of the Ninth Flotilla based at Chatham, one of four Flotillas equipped with old destroyers and torpedo boats for patrol purposes. In December 1913, Kale entered another refit, this time at Pembroke Dockyard with the aim of retubing her boilers. This refit was completed by July 1914.

== World War I ==
In early 1914 when displaced by G-class destroyers she joined the 9th Destroyer Flotilla based at Chatham tendered to HMS St George. The 9th Flotilla was a patrol flotilla tasked with anti-submarine and counter-mining patrols in the Firth of Forth area.

In August 1915 with the amalgamation of the 9th and 7th Flotillas she was deployed to the 7th Destroyer Flotilla based at the River Humber. She remained employed on the Humber patrol participating in counter-mining operations and anti-submarine patrols for the remainder of the war.

== Loss ==
On 27 March 1918 Kale was lost after striking a contact mine in the North Sea with the loss of 41 officers and men. It seems she hit a British mine. David Hepper in British Warship Losses records: "The court martial enquiry was very critical of Commander Dennison [in command]. He had steered a course which was six miles east of the swept channel [i.e. swept for mines] and straight into a prohibited area which contained a defensive British minefield; details of the restricted zone had been promulgated several weeks earlier, but he had failed to read them or to see that the information provided was marked on the charts."

== Pennant numbers ==
| Pennant number | From | To |
|---|---|---|
| N45 | 6 December 1914 | 1 September 1915 |
| D23 | 1 September 1915 | 1 January 1918 |
| D47 | 1 January 1918 | 27 March 1918 |

== Bibliography ==
- Chesneau, Roger & Kolesnik, Eugene M., eds. (1979). Conway's All The World's Fighting Ships 1860–1905. London: Conway Maritime Press. ISBN 0-85177-133-5.
- Colledge, J. J.; Warlow, Ben (2006) [1969]. Ships of the Royal Navy: The Complete Record of All Fighting Ships of the Royal Navy from the 15th Century to the Present (3rd Rev ed.). London: Chatham Publishing. ISBN 978-1-86176-281-8. OCLC 67375475.
- Dittmar, F.J.; Colledge, J. J. (1972). British Warships 1914–1919. Shepperton, UK: Ian Allan. ISBN 0-7110-0380-7.
- Friedman, Norman (2009). British Destroyers: From Earliest Days to the Second World War. Barnsley, UK: Seaforth Publishing. ISBN 978-1-84832-049-9.
- Gardiner, Robert & Gray, Randal, eds. (1985). Conway's All The World's Fighting Ships 1906–1921. London: Conway Maritime Press. ISBN 0-85177-245-5.
- Manning, T. D. (1961). The British Destroyer. London: Putnam & Co. OCLC 6470051.
- March, Edgar J. (1966). British Destroyers: A History of Development, 1892–1953; Drawn by Admiralty Permission From Official Records & Returns, Ships' Covers & Building Plans. London: Seeley Service. OCLC 164893555.
