= HMS Eden (1903) =

Destroyer of the Royal Navy

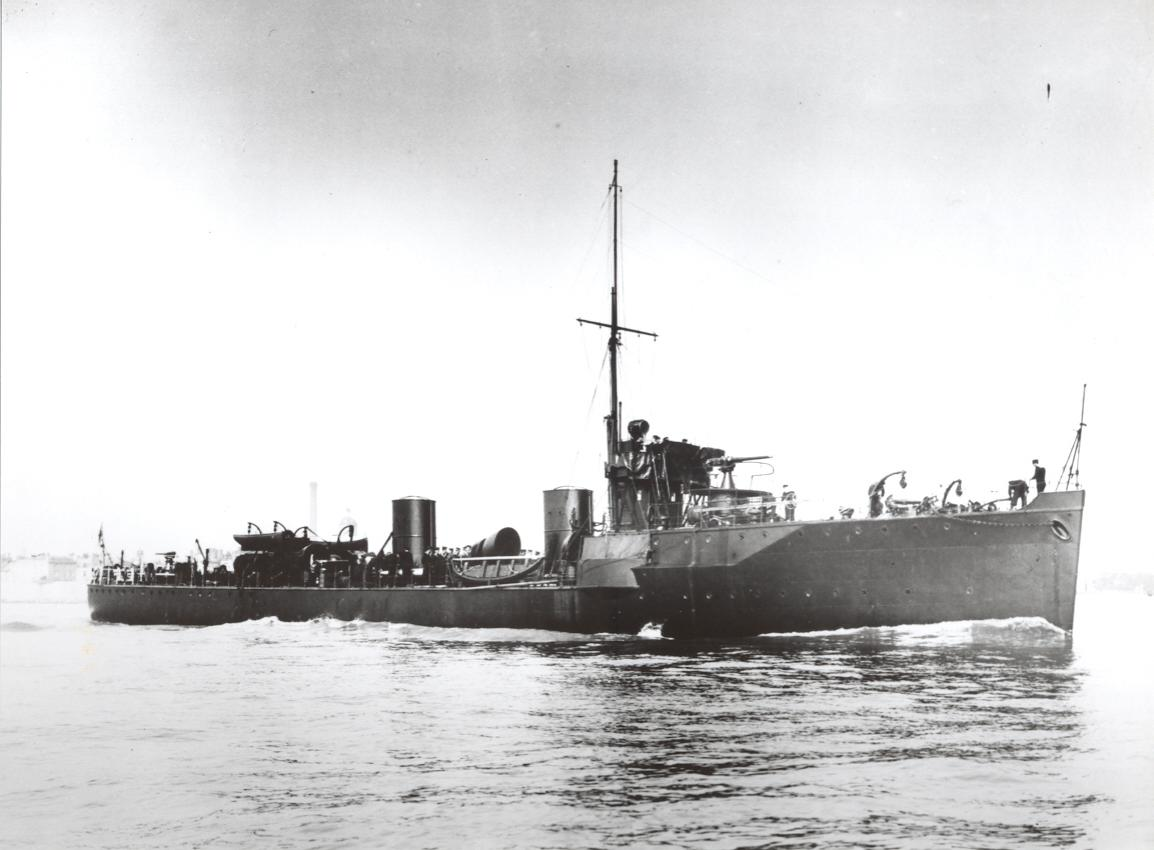
- HMS Eden in 1909.

History

United Kingdom
- Name: HMS Eden
- Ordered: 1901 – 1902 Naval Estimates
- Builder: R.W. Hawthorn Leslie and Company, Ltd, Newcastle-upon-Tyne
- Laid down: 12 June 1902
- Launched: 13 March 1903
- Commissioned: June 1904
- Fate: Lost in collision, 18 June 1916

General characteristics
- Class & type: Hawthorn Leslie type River-class destroyer
- Displacement: 550 long tons (559 t) standard; 625 long tons (635 t) full load; 226 ft 6 in (69.04 m) o/a; 23 ft 9 in (7.24 m) beam; 7 ft 9 in (2.36 m) draught
- Installed power: 7,000 shp (5,200 kW) (average)
- Propulsion: 4 × Yarrow-type water-tube boilers; 3 × Parsons direct drive steam turbines; 3 × shafts
- Speed: 25.5 kn (47.2 km/h)
- Range: 140 tons coal; 1,870 nmi (3,460 km) at 11 kn (20 km/h)
- Complement: 70 officers and men
- Armament: 1 × QF 12-pounder 12 cwt Mark I, mounting P Mark I; 3 × QF 12-pounder 8 cwt, mounting G Mark I (added in 1906); 5 × QF 6-pounder 8 cwt (removed in 1906); 2 × single tubes for 18-inch (450mm) torpedoes

Service record
- Part of: East Coast Destroyer Flotilla - 1905; 3rd Destroyer Flotilla - Apr 1909; 5th Destroyer Flotilla - 1912; 9th Destroyer Flotilla - 1914
- Operations: World War I 1914 - 1918

HMS Eden was a Hawthorn Leslie type River-class destroyer ordered by the Royal Navy under the 1901 – 1902 Naval Estimates. Named after the River Eden in northern England, she was the second ship to carry this name since it was introduced in 1814.

== Construction ==
She was laid down on 12 June 1902 at the Hawthorn Leslie shipyard at Hebburn-on-Tyne and launched on 13 March 1903. She was completed in June 1904. She differed from the other boats of the class by having Parsons turbines instead of reciprocating steam engines. On her trials she made 26.2 knots (48.5 km/h; 30.2 mph), and was the fastest boat of the class. Her original armament was to be the same as the turtleback torpedo boat destroyers that preceded her. In 1906 the Admiralty decided to upgrade the armament by landing the five 6-pounder naval guns and shipping three 12-pounder 8 hundredweight (cwt) guns. Two would be mounted abeam at the fo'clse break and the third gun would be mounted on the quarterdeck.

== Pre war ==
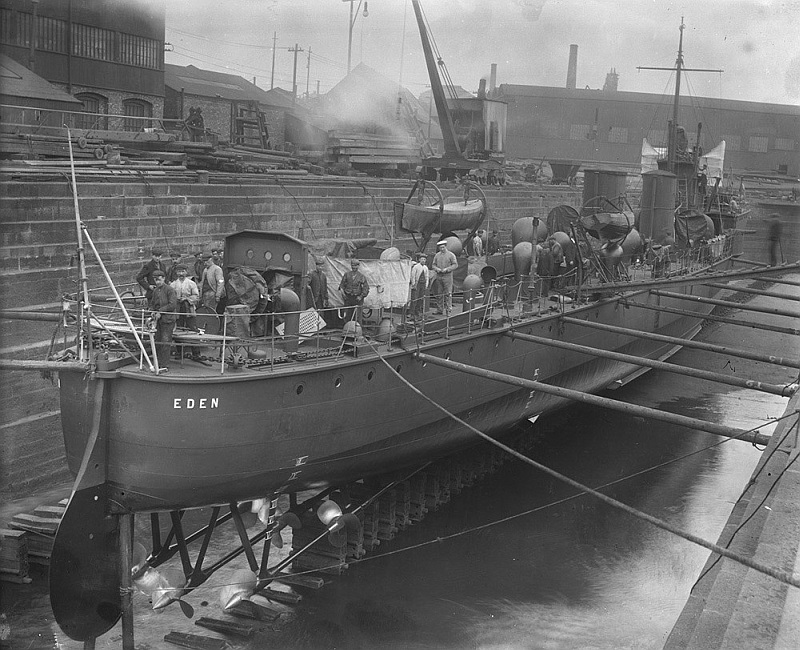
HMS Eden in drydock in 1904.

After commissioning she was assigned to the East Coast Destroyer Flotilla of the 1st Fleet and based at Harwich. She was used for a lot of test runs with her conventionally-powered sister Waveney to ascertain whether her turbines represented an improvement.

In April 1909 she was assigned to the 3rd Destroyer Flotilla on its formation at Harwich. She remained until displaced by a Basilisk-class destroyer by May 1912. She was assigned to the 5th Destroyer Flotilla of the 2nd Fleet with a nucleus crew.

In the early morning of 28 January 1910 while under the command of Lieutenant Oliver M F Stokes she broke loose from her moorings in bad weather and sank at the Harbour Jetty under the East Cliff at Dover. She was refloated on 30 January and repaired.

On 30 August 1912 the Admiralty directed all destroyer classes were to be designated by alpha characters starting with the letter 'A'. The ships of the River class were assigned to the E class. After 30 September 1913, she was known as an E-class destroyer and had the letter ‘E’ painted on the hull below the bridge area and on either the fore or aft funnel.

== World War I ==
In early 1914 when displaced by G-class destroyers she joined the 9th Destroyer Flotilla based at Chatham tendered to HMS St George. The 9th Flotilla was a patrol flotilla tasked with anti-submarine and counter mining patrols in the Firth of Forth area. By September 1914, she was deployed to the Dover Patrol based at Portsmouth. Here she provided anti-submarine, counter mining patrols and defended the Dover Barrage.

== Loss ==
On the night of 18 June 1916 HMS Eden collided with the transport SS France in the English Channel. She sank with the loss of her commander, Lieutenant A C N Farquhar and 42 officers and men. The damaged transport rescued 33 officers and men. Today, her wreck lies in 34 m (112 ft) in the waters near Fécamp.

== Pennant numbers ==
Pennant number	From	To
N42	6 December 1914	1 September 1915
D17	1 September 1915	18 June 1916

== Bibliography ==
- Chesneau, Roger & Kolesnik, Eugene M., eds. (1979). Conway's All The World's Fighting Ships 1860–1905. London: Conway Maritime Press. ISBN 0-85177-133-5.
- Colledge, J. J.; Warlow, Ben (2006) [1969]. Ships of the Royal Navy: The Complete Record of All Fighting Ships of the Royal Navy from the 15th Century to the Present (3rd Rev ed.). London: Chatham Publishing. ISBN 978-1-86176-281-8. OCLC 67375475.
- Dittmar, F.J.; Colledge, J. J. (1972). British Warships 1914–1919. Shepperton, UK: Ian Allan. ISBN 0-7110-0380-7.
- Friedman, Norman (2009). British Destroyers: From Earliest Days to the Second World War. Barnsley, UK: Seaforth Publishing. ISBN 978-1-84832-049-9.
- Gardiner, Robert & Gray, Randal, eds. (1985). Conway's All The World's Fighting Ships 1906–1921. London: Conway Maritime Press. ISBN 0-85177-245-5.
- Manning, T. D. (1961). The British Destroyer. London: Putnam & Co. OCLC 6470051.
- March, Edgar J. (1966). British Destroyers: A History of Development, 1892–1953; Drawn by Admiralty Permission From Official Records & Returns, Ships' Covers & Building Plans. London: Seeley Service. OCLC 164893555.
