= HMS Swale (1905) =

Destroyer of the Royal Navy

History

United Kingdom
- Name: Swale
- Ordered: 1903 – 1904 Naval Estimates
- Builder: Palmers Shipbuilding and Iron Company, Jarrow
- Laid down: 23 February 1904
- Launched: 20 April 1905
- Commissioned: September 1905
- Out of service: In 1919 she was laid up in reserve awaiting disposal
- Fate: 23 June 1919 sold to Thos. W. Ward of Sheffield for breaking at Preston, Lancashire

General characteristics
- Class & type: Palmer Type River Class destroyer
- Displacement: 550 long tons (559 t) standard; 620 long tons (630 t) full load; 223 ft 6 in (68.12 m) o/a; 23 ft 6 in (7.16 m) Beam; 7 ft 4.5 in (2.248 m) Draught
- Propulsion: 4 × Reed water tube boilers; 2 × Vertical Triple Expansion (VTE) steam engines driving 2 shafts producing 7,000 shp (5,200 kW) (average)
- Speed: 25.5 kn (47.2 km/h)
- Range: 140 tons coal; 1,620 nmi (3,000 km) at 11 kn (20 km/h)
- Complement: 70 officers and men
- Armament: 1 × QF 12-pounder 12 cwt Mark I, mounting P Mark I; 3 × QF 12-pounder 8 cwt, mounting G Mark I (Added in 1906); 5 × QF 6-pounder 8 cwt (removed in 1906); 2 × single tubes for 18-inch (450mm) torpedoes

Service record
- Part of: East Coast Destroyer Flotilla - 1905; 3rd Destroyer Flotilla - Apr 1909; 5th Destroyer Flotilla - 1912; Assigned E Class - Aug 1912 - Oct 1913; 9th Destroyer Flotilla - 1914; 1st Destroyer Flotilla - Nov 1916
- Operations: World War I 1914 - 1918

HMS Swale was a Palmer Type River Class Destroyer ordered by the Royal Navy under the 1903 – 1904 Naval Estimates. Named after the River Swale north east of York, she was the second ship to carry this name since it was introduced in 1841 for a lighter.

== Construction ==
She was laid down on 23 February 1904 at the Palmers shipyard at Jarrow and launched on 20 April 1905. She was completed in September 1905. Her original armament was to be the same as the Turleback torpedo boat destroyers that preceded her. In 1906 the Admiralty decided to upgrade the armament by landing the five 6-pounder naval guns and shipping three 12-pounder 8 hundredweight (cwt) guns. Two would be mounted abeam at the fo'c's'le break and the third gun would be mounted on the quarterdeck.

== Pre-War ==
After commissioning she was assigned to China Station in late 1905.

On 30 August 1912 the Admiralty directed all destroyer classes were to be designated by alpha characters starting with the letter 'A'. The ships of the River Class were assigned to the E Class. After 30 September 1913, she was known as an E Class destroyer and had the letter ‘E’ painted on the hull below the bridge area and on either the fore or aft funnel.

== World War I ==
Upon her return in early 1914 she was assigned to the 9th Destroyer Flotilla based at Chatham tendered to HMS St George. The 9th Flotilla was a Patrol Flotilla tasked with anti-submarine and countermining patrols in the Firth of Forth area. By August she had been redeployed to Scapa Flow Local Flotilla and tendered to HMS Marlborough. Here she provided anti-submarine and counter mining patrols in defence of the main fleet anchorage.

In November 1916 she was assigned to the 1st Destroyer Flotilla when it was redeployed to Portsmouth. She was equipped with depth charges for employment in anti-submarine patrols, escorting of merchant ships and defending the Dover Barrage. In the spring of 1917 as the convoy system was being introduced the 1st Flotilla was employed in convoy escort duties for the English Channel for the remainder of the war.

== Disposition ==
In 1919 she was paid off and laid up in reserve awaiting disposal. On 23 June 1919 she was sold to Thos. W. Ward of Sheffield for breaking at Preston, Lancashire.

She was not awarded a Battle Honour for her service.

== Pennant Numbers ==
Pennant Number	From	To
N03	6 Dec 1914	1 Sep 1915
D31	1 Sep 1915	1 Jan 1918
D83	1 Jan 1918	23 Jun 1919

== Bibliography ==
- Chesneau, Roger & Kolesnik, Eugene M., eds. (1979). Conway's All The World's Fighting Ships 1860–1905. London: Conway Maritime Press. ISBN 0-85177-133-5.
- Colledge, J. J.; Warlow, Ben (2006) [1969]. Ships of the Royal Navy: The Complete Record of All Fighting Ships of the Royal Navy from the 15th Century to the Present (3rd Rev ed.). London: Chatham Publishing. ISBN 978-1-86176-281-8. OCLC 67375475.
- Dittmar, F.J.; Colledge, J. J. (1972). British Warships 1914–1919. Shepperton, UK: Ian Allan. ISBN 0-7110-0380-7.
- Friedman, Norman (2009). British Destroyers: From Earliest Days to the Second World War. Barnsley, UK: Seaforth Publishing. ISBN 978-1-84832-049-9.
- Gardiner, Robert & Gray, Randal, eds. (1985). Conway's All The World's Fighting Ships 1906–1921. London: Conway Maritime Press. ISBN 0-85177-245-5.
- Manning, T. D. (1961). The British Destroyer. London: Putnam & Co. OCLC 6470051.
- March, Edgar J. (1966). British Destroyers: A History of Development, 1892–1953; Drawn by Admiralty Permission From Official Records & Returns, Ships' Covers & Building Plans. London: Seeley Service. OCLC 164893555.
