= HMS Erne (1903) =

Destroyer of the Royal Navy

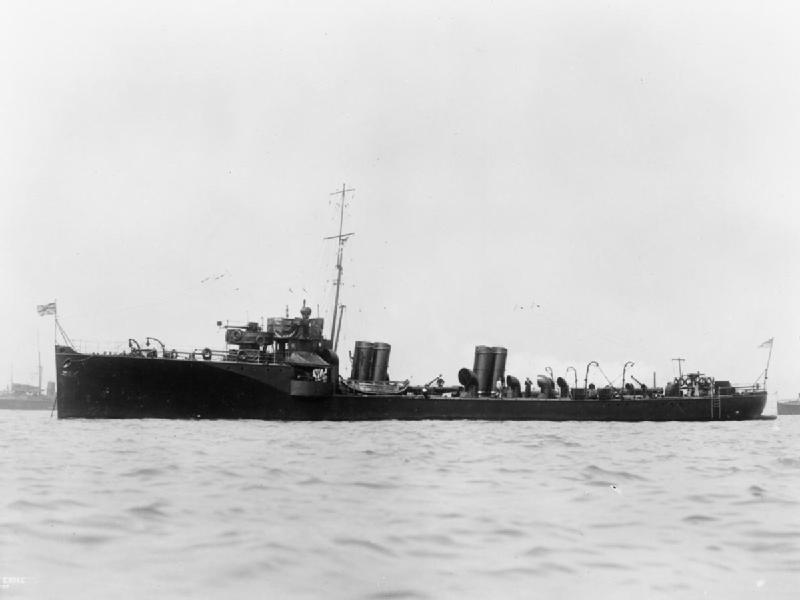
- HMS Erne

History

United Kingdom
- Name: HMS Erne
- Ordered: 1901 – 1902 Naval Estimates
- Builder: Palmers Shipbuilding and Iron Company, Jarrow
- Laid down: 3 July 1902
- Launched: 14 January 1903
- Commissioned: February 1904
- Out of service: 6 February 1915 wrecked on the Scottish North Sea Coast at Rattray Head lighthouse north east of Aberdeenshire
- Stricken: Abandoned as wreck October 1915
- Fate: Her wreck sold for £405 January 1916 to Forth Shipbreaking, Bo’ness for breaking

General characteristics
- Class & type: Palmer Type River Class destroyer
- Displacement: 550 long tons (559 t) standard; 620 long tons (630 t) full load; 223 ft 6 in (68.12 m) o/a; 23 ft 6 in (7.16 m) Beam; 7 ft 4.5 in (2.248 m) Draught
- Propulsion: 4 × Reed water tube boilers; 2 × Vertical Triple Expansion (VTE) steam engines driving 2 shafts producing 7,000 shp (5,200 kW) (average)
- Speed: 25.5 kn (47.2 km/h)
- Range: 140 tons coal; 1,620 nmi (3,000 km) at 11 kn (20 km/h)
- Complement: 70 officers and men
- Armament: 1 × QF 12-pounder 12 cwt Mark I, mounting P Mark I; 3 × QF 12-pounder 8 cwt, mounting G Mark I (Added in 1906); 5 × QF 6-pounder 8 cwt (removed in 1906); 2 × single tubes for 18-inch (450mm) torpedoes

Service record
- Part of: East Coast Destroyer Flotilla - 1905; 3rd Destroyer Flotilla - Apr 1909; 5th Destroyer Flotilla - 1912; Assigned E Class - Aug 1912 - Oct 1913; 9th Destroyer Flotilla - 1914
- Operations: World War I 1914 - 1918

HMS Erne was a Palmer Type River Class Destroyer ordered by the Royal Navy under the 1901 – 1902 Naval Estimates. Named after the River Erne in Ireland, she was the third ship to carry this name since it was introduced in 1813 for a 20-gun brig sold in 1819.

== Construction ==
She was laid down on 3 July 1902 at the Palmers shipyard at Jarrow and launched on 14 January 1903, when she was named by Mrs. Henry Simms. She was completed in February 1904. Her original armament was to be the same as the turtle-back torpedo boat destroyers that preceded her. In 1906 the Admiralty decided to upgrade the armament by landing the five 6-pounder naval guns and shipping three 12-pounder 8 hundredweight (cwt) guns. Two would be mounted abeam at the forecastle break and the third gun would be mounted on the quarterdeck.

== Pre-War ==
After commissioning she was assigned to the East Coast Destroyer Flotilla of the 1st Fleet and based at Harwich.

In April 1909 she was assigned to the 3rd Destroyer Flotilla on its formation at Harwich. She remained until displaced by a Basilisk Class destroyer by May 1912. She was assigned to the 5th Destroyer Flotilla of the 2nd Fleet with a nucleus crew.

On 30 August 1912 the Admiralty directed all destroyer classes were to be designated by alpha characters starting with the letter "A". The ships of the River Class were assigned to the E Class. After 30 September 1913, she was known as an E Class destroyer and had the letter "E" painted on the hull below the bridge area and on either the fore or aft funnel.

== World War I ==
In early 1914 when displaced by G Class destroyers she joined the 9th Destroyer Flotilla based at Chatham tendered to HMS St George. The 9th Flotilla was a Patrol Flotilla tasked with anti-submarine and counter mining patrols in the Firth of Forth area. Soon after the commencement of hostilities she was deployed to the Scapa Flow Local Flotilla under the command of the Commander-in-Chief Home Fleet tendered to HMS King George V. Her duties here included counter mining patrols and antisubmarine measures in defence of the Fleet anchorage.

== Loss ==
On 6 February 1915 under the command of Lieutenant-Commander John Landon, RN during a severe easterly gale, Erne was driven ashore on the North Sea coast of Scotland northeast of Aberdeenshire, 800 yards (730 meters) south of Rattray Head lighthouse, with no lives lost. After efforts to refloat her failed, she was abandoned as a wreck in October 1915. After a survey in November 1915, it was discovered that her back was broken, and she was sold for £405 to Forth Shipbreaking, Bo’ness, Scotland, in January 1916 for breaking.

Erne was not awarded a battle honour for her service.

== Pennant Numbers ==
Pennant Number	From	To
N58	6 Dec 1914	6 Feb 1915

== Bibliography ==
- Chesneau, Roger & Kolesnik, Eugene M., eds. (1979). Conway's All The World's Fighting Ships 1860–1905. London: Conway Maritime Press. ISBN 0-85177-133-5.
- Colledge, J. J.; Warlow, Ben (2006) [1969]. Ships of the Royal Navy: The Complete Record of All Fighting Ships of the Royal Navy from the 15th Century to the Present (3rd Rev ed.). London: Chatham Publishing. ISBN 978-1-86176-281-8. OCLC 67375475.
- Dittmar, F.J.; Colledge, J. J. (1972). British Warships 1914–1919. Shepperton, UK: Ian Allan. ISBN 0-7110-0380-7.
- Friedman, Norman (2009). British Destroyers: From Earliest Days to the Second World War. Barnsley, UK: Seaforth Publishing. ISBN 978-1-84832-049-9.
- Gardiner, Robert & Gray, Randal, eds. (1985). Conway's All The World's Fighting Ships 1906–1921. London: Conway Maritime Press. ISBN 0-85177-245-5.
- Manning, T. D. (1961). The British Destroyer. London: Putnam & Co. OCLC 6470051.
- March, Edgar J. (1966). British Destroyers: A History of Development, 1892–1953; Drawn by Admiralty Permission From Official Records & Returns, Ships' Covers & Building Plans. London: Seeley Service. OCLC 164893555.
