= HMS Ettrick (1903) =

Destroyer of the Royal Navy

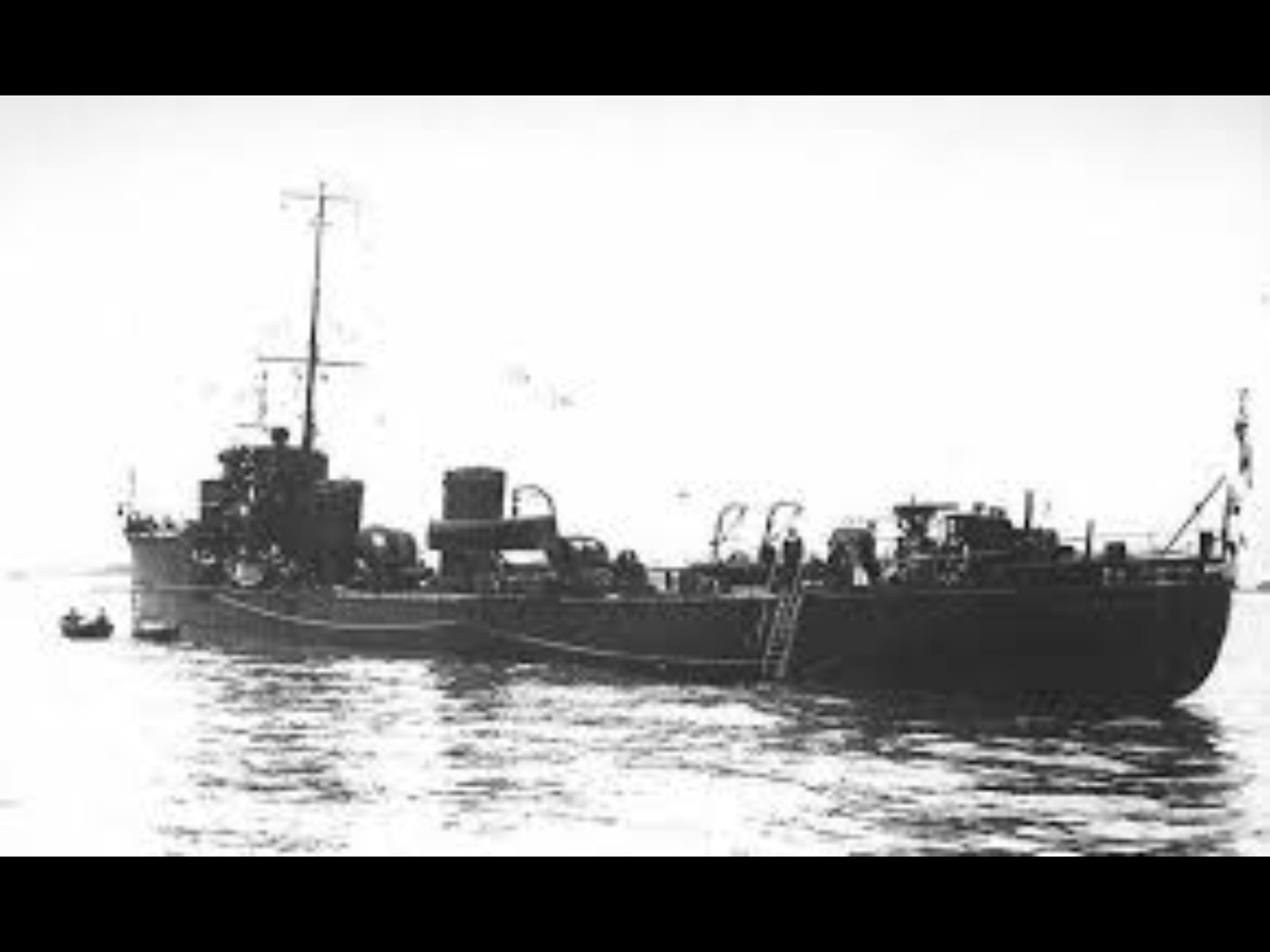
- The River-class destroyer Ettrick

History

United Kingdom
- Name: Ettrick
- Ordered: 1901 – 1902 Naval Estimates
- Builder: Palmers Shipbuilding and Iron Company, Jarrow
- Laid down: 9 July 1902
- Launched: 28 February 1903
- Commissioned: February 1904
- Fate: Torpedoed 7 July 1917, wreck sold 27 May 1919

General characteristics
- Class & type: River-class destroyer
- Displacement: 550 long tons (559 t) standard; 620 long tons (630 t) full load
- Length: 223 ft 6 in (68.1 m) o/a
- Beam: 23 ft 6 in (7.2 m)
- Draught: 7 ft 4 1/2 in (2.2 m)
- Installed power: 7,000 shp (5,200 kW)
- Propulsion: 4 × Reed water tube boilers; 2 × vertical triple-expansion steam engines; 2 shafts
- Speed: 25.5 kn (47.2 km/h)
- Range: 140 tons coal; 1,620 nmi (3,000 km) at 11 kn (20 km/h)
- Complement: 70 officers and men
- Armament: 1 × QF 12-pounder (12 cwt) Mark I, mounting P Mark I; 3 × QF 12-pounder 8 cwt guns, mounting G Mark I (added in 1906); 5 × QF 6-pounder (8 cwt) guns (removed in 1906); 2 × single tubes for 18-inch (450mm) torpedoes

Service record
- Part of: East Coast Destroyer Flotilla - 1905; 3rd Destroyer Flotilla - Apr 1909; 5th Destroyer Flotilla - 1912; Assigned E Class - Aug 1912 - Oct 1913; 9th Destroyer Flotilla - 1914; 1st Destroyer Flotilla - Nov 1916
- Operations: World War I 1914 - 1918

HMS Ettrick was a River-class destroyer ordered by the Royal Navy under the 1901 – 1902 Naval Estimates. Named after Ettrick Water in the Scottish Borders area south of Edinburgh, she was the first ship to carry this name in the Royal Navy. She was launched in 1903 and served during World War I. She was torpedoed by UC-61 in 1917.

== Construction ==
She was laid down on 9 July 1902 at the Palmers shipyard at Jarrow and launched on 28 February 1903. She was completed in February 1904. Her original armament was to be the same as the Turleback torpedo boat destroyers that preceded her. In 1906 the Admiralty decided to upgrade the armament by landing the five 6-pounder naval guns and shipping three 12-pounder (8 cwt) guns. Two would be mounted abeam at the forecastle break and the third gun would be mounted on the quarterdeck.

== Pre-War ==
After commissioning she was assigned to the East Coast Destroyer Flotilla of the 1st Fleet and based at Harwich. On 27 April 1908 the Eastern Flotilla departed Harwich for live fire and night manoeuvres. During these exercises the light cruiser Attentive rammed and sank the destroyer Gala and then damaged the destroyer Ribble.

In April 1909 she was assigned to the 3rd Destroyer Flotilla on its formation at Harwich. She remained there until replaced by a Beagle-class destroyer by May 1912. She was assigned to the 5th Destroyer Flotilla of the 2nd Fleet with a nucleus crew.

On 30 August 1912 the Admiralty directed all destroyer classes were to be designated by letters starting with 'A'. The ships of the River class were assigned to the E class. After 30 September 1913, she was known as an E-class destroyer and had the letter ‘E’ painted on the hull below the bridge area and on either the fore or aft funnel.

== World War I ==
In early 1914 when displaced by G-class destroyers she joined the 9th Destroyer Flotilla based at Chatham tendered to HMS St George. The 9th Flotilla was a patrol flotilla tasked with anti-submarine and counter-mining patrols in the Firth of Forth area. By September 1914, she was deployed to Portsmouth and the Dover Patrol. Here she provided anti-submarine and counter-mining patrols and defended the Dover Barrage.

In August 1915 with the amalgamation of the 7th and 9th Flotillas, she was assigned to the 1st Destroyer Flotilla when it was redeployed to Portsmouth in November 1916. She was equipped with depth charges for employment in anti-submarine patrols, escorting of merchant ships and defending the Dover Barrage. In the spring of 1917 as the convoy system was being introduced the 1st Flotilla was employed in convoy escort duties in the English Channel for the remainder of the war.

== Loss ==
On 7 July 1917 she was torpedoed by the German submarine UC-61, 15 miles south by west of Beachy Head in the English Channel with the loss of 49 officers and men. She lost her bows and was towed back to port. She was not repaired and was instead hulked until the end of the First World War. She was sold on 27 May 1919 to the James Dredging Company for breaking.

== Pennant numbers ==
Pennant number	From	To
N01	6 Dec 1914	1 Sep 1915
D18	1 Sep 1915	1 Jan 1918
D32	1 Jan 1918	27 May 1919

== Bibliography ==
- Chesneau, Roger & Kolesnik, Eugene M., eds. (1979). Conway's All The World's Fighting Ships 1860–1905. London: Conway Maritime Press. ISBN 0-85177-133-5.
- Colledge, J. J.; Warlow, Ben (2006) [1969]. Ships of the Royal Navy: The Complete Record of All Fighting Ships of the Royal Navy from the 15th Century to the Present (3rd Rev ed.). London: Chatham Publishing. ISBN 978-1-86176-281-8. OCLC 67375475.
- Dittmar, F.J.; Colledge, J. J. (1972). British Warships 1914–1919. Shepperton, UK: Ian Allan. ISBN 0-7110-0380-7.
- Friedman, Norman (2009). British Destroyers: From Earliest Days to the Second World War. Barnsley, UK: Seaforth Publishing. ISBN 978-1-84832-049-9.
- Gardiner, Robert & Gray, Randal, eds. (1985). Conway's All The World's Fighting Ships 1906–1921. London: Conway Maritime Press. ISBN 0-85177-245-5.
- Manning, T. D. (1961). The British Destroyer. London: Putnam & Co. OCLC 6470051.
- March, Edgar J. (1966). British Destroyers: A History of Development, 1892–1953; Drawn by Admiralty Permission From Official Records & Returns, Ships' Covers & Building Plans. London: Seeley Service. OCLC 164893555.
