= HMS Ness (1905) =

Destroyer of the Royal Navy

History

United Kingdom
- Name: Ness
- Ordered: 1903 – 1904 Naval Estimates
- Builder: J. Samuel White, Cowes
- Laid down: 5 May 1904
- Launched: 5 January 1905
- Commissioned: August 1905
- Out of service: Laid up in reserve 1919
- Fate: 27 May 1919 sold to T.R. Sales for breaking

General characteristics
- Class & type: White Type River-class destroyer
- Displacement: 535 long tons (544 t) standard; 605 long tons (615 t) full load; 229 ft 6 in (69.95 m) o/a; 23 ft 10 in (7.26 m) Beam; 10 ft (3.0 m) Draught
- Propulsion: 4 × White-Forster type water tube boiler; 2 × Vertical Triple Expansion (VTE) steam engines driving 2 shafts producing 7,000 shp (5,200 kW) (average)
- Speed: 25.5 kn (47.2 km/h)
- Range: 135 tons coal; 1,870 nmi (3,460 km) at 11 kn (20 km/h)
- Complement: 70 officers and men
- Armament: 1 × QF 12-pounder 12 cwt Mark I, mounting P Mark I; 3 × QF 12-pounder 8 cwt, mounting G Mark I (Added in 1906); 5 × QF 6-pounder 8 cwt (removed in 1906); 2 × single tubes for 18-inch (450mm) torpedoes

Service record
- Part of: East Coast Destroyer Flotilla – 1905; 3rd Destroyer Flotilla – Apr 1909; 5th Destroyer Flotilla – 1912; Assigned E Class – Aug 1912 – Oct 1913; 9th Destroyer Flotilla – 1914; 7th Destroyer Flotilla – Aug 1915
- Operations: World War I 1914–1918

HMS Ness was a White Type River-class destroyer ordered by the Royal Navy under the 1903 – 1904 Naval Estimates. Named after the River Ness in northern Scotland, flowing through Inverness, she was the first ship to carry this name in the Royal Navy.

== Construction ==
She was laid down on 5 May 1904 at the J Samuel White shipyard at Cowes and launched on 5 January 1905. She was completed in August 1905. Her original armament was to be the same as the Turtleback torpedo boat destroyers that preceded her. In 1906 the Admiralty decided to upgrade the armament by landing the five 6-pounder naval guns and shipping three 12-pounder 8 hundredweight (cwt) guns. Two would be mounted abeam at the foc's'le break, and the third gun would be mounted on the quarterdeck.

== Pre-War ==
After commissioning Ness was assigned to the East Coast Destroyer Flotilla of the 1st Fleet and based at Harwich.

On 27 April 1908 the Eastern Flotilla departed Harwich for live fire and night manoeuvres. During these exercises the cruiser HMS Attentive rammed and sank the destroyer HMS Gala then damaged HMS Ribble.

In April 1909 Ness was assigned to the 3rd Destroyer Flotilla of the 1st Fleet on its formation at Harwich. She remained until displaced by a Beagle-class destroyer by May 1912. She went into reserve assigned to the 5th Destroyer Flotilla of the 2nd Fleet with a nucleus crew.

On 30 August 1912 the Admiralty directed all destroyer classes were to be designated by alpha characters starting with the letter 'A'. The ships of the River class were assigned to the E class. After 30 September 1913, she was known as an E-class destroyer and had the letter ‘E’ painted on the hull below the bridge area and on either the fore or aft funnel.

== World War I ==
In early 1914 when displaced by G-class destroyers (the new designation for the Beagle class) she joined the 9th Destroyer Flotilla based at Chatham tendered to HMS St George. The 9th Flotilla was a patrol flotilla tasked with anti-submarine and counter mining patrols in the Firth of Forth area. By September 1914, she was deployed to Portsmouth and the Dover Patrol. Here she provided anti-submarine, counter mining patrols and defended the Dover Barrage.

In August 1915 with the amalgamation of the 9th and 7th Flotillas she was deployed to the 7th Destroyer Flotilla based at the River Humber. She remained employed on the Humber Patrol participating in counter mining operations and anti-submarine patrols for the remainder of the war.

== Disposition ==
In 1919 Ness was paid off then laid up in reserve awaiting disposal. On 27 May 1919 she was sold to T.R. Sales for breaking.

She was not awarded a Battle Honour for her service.

== Pennant Numbers ==
| Pennant Number | From | To |
|---|---|---|
| N81 | 6 Dec 1914 | 1 Sep 1915 |
| D26 | 1 Sep 1915 | 1 Jan 1918 |
| D59 | 1 Jan 1918 | 13 Sep 1918 |
| H77 | 13 Sep 1918 | 30 Aug 1919 |

== Bibliography ==
- Chesneau, Roger & Kolesnik, Eugene M., eds. (1979). Conway's All The World's Fighting Ships 1860–1905. London: Conway Maritime Press. ISBN 0-85177-133-5.
- Colledge, J. J.; Warlow, Ben (2006) [1969]. Ships of the Royal Navy: The Complete Record of All Fighting Ships of the Royal Navy from the 15th Century to the Present (3rd Rev ed.). London: Chatham Publishing. ISBN 978-1-86176-281-8. OCLC 67375475.
- Dittmar, F.J.; Colledge, J. J. (1972). British Warships 1914–1919. Shepperton, UK: Ian Allan. ISBN 0-7110-0380-7.
- Friedman, Norman (2009). British Destroyers: From Earliest Days to the Second World War. Barnsley, UK: Seaforth Publishing. ISBN 978-1-84832-049-9.
- Gardiner, Robert & Gray, Randal, eds. (1985). Conway's All The World's Fighting Ships 1906–1921. London: Conway Maritime Press. ISBN 0-85177-245-5.
- Manning, T. D. (1961). The British Destroyer. London: Putnam & Co. OCLC 6470051.
- March, Edgar J. (1966). British Destroyers: A History of Development, 1892–1953; Drawn by Admiralty Permission From Official Records & Returns, Ships' Covers & Building Plans. London: Seeley Service. OCLC 164893555.
