= HMS Wear (1905) =

Destroyer of the Royal Navy

History

United Kingdom
- Name: Wear
- Ordered: 1903 – 1904 Naval Estimates
- Builder: Palmers Shipbuilding and Iron Company, Jarrow
- Laid down: 7 March 1904
- Launched: 21 January 1905
- Commissioned: August of 1905
- Out of service: In 1919 she was laid up in reserve awaiting disposal
- Honours and awards: Dardanelles 1915 - 1916
- Fate: 4 November 1919 sold to Thos. W. Ward of Sheffield for breaking at Grays, Essex on the Thames Estuary

General characteristics
- Class & type: Palmer Type River Class destroyer
- Displacement: 550 long tons (559 t) standard; 620 long tons (630 t) full load; 223 ft 6 in (68.12 m) o/a; 23 ft 6 in (7.16 m) Beam; 7 ft 4.5 in (2.248 m) Draught
- Propulsion: 4 × Reed water tube boilers; 2 × Vertical Triple Expansion (VTE) steam engines driving 2 shafts producing 7,000 shp (5,200 kW) (average)
- Speed: 25.5 kn (47.2 km/h)
- Range: 140 tons coal; 1,620 nmi (3,000 km) at 11 kn (20 km/h)
- Complement: 70 officers and men
- Armament: 1 × QF 12-pounder 12 cwt Mark I, mounting P Mark I; 3 × QF 12-pounder 8 cwt, mounting G Mark I (Added in 1906); 5 × QF 6-pounder 8 cwt (removed in 1906); 2 × single tubes for 18-inch (450mm) torpedoes

Service record
- Part of: China Station – 1905; Assigned E Class – Aug 1912 – Oct 1913; 5th Destroyer Flotilla – 1914
- Operations: World War I 1914 - 1918

HMS Wear was a Palmer Type River Class Destroyer ordered by the Royal Navy under the 1903–1904 Naval Estimates. Named after the River Wear a river flowing through Sunderland on the East Coast of England, she was the first ship to carry this name in the Royal Navy.

== Construction ==
She was laid down on 7 March 1904 at the Palmers shipyard at Jarrow and launched on 21 January 1905. She was completed on 1 August 1905. Her original armament was to be the same as the Turtleback torpedo boat destroyers that preceded her. In 1906 the Admiralty decided to upgrade the armament by landing the five 6-pounder naval guns and shipping three 12-pounder 8 hundredweight (cwt) guns. Two would be mounted abeam at the foc's'le break, and the third gun would be mounted on the quarterdeck.

== Pre-War ==
After commissioning, she was assigned to China Station in late 1905.

Wear was part of the Second Destroyer Flotilla of the Home Fleet in 1907, and on 12 January 1907 left Sheerness with the other ships of her flotilla for Portland, but she collided with the merchant ship Etna off Beachy Head the next night. Wear was badly damaged and underwent initial repairs at Portsmouth Dockyard before returning to Sheerness to complete the repairs.

On 30 August 1912 the Admiralty directed all destroyer classes were to be designated by alpha characters starting with the letter 'A'. The ships of the River Class were assigned to the E Class. After 30 September 1913, she was known as an E Class destroyer and had the letter ‘E’ painted on the hull below the bridge area and on either the fore or aft funnel.

On 17 July 1913 Wear was commissioned into the North Sea Fishery Protection Flotilla as a temporary replacement for the torpedo gunboat Leda which had paid off for a refit.

== World War I ==
Wear, under refit at Gibraltar, was ordered to join the local patrol force at Gibraltar in September 1914. In March 1915 Wear was deployed on patrol off the Straits of Gibraltar, examining merchant ships passing through the Straits and keeping watch for German submarines attempting to enter the Mediterranean. She was tasked to the Dardanelles Campaign and provided escort duties for merchantships and transports as well as fire support for the beaches.

During the bombardment on 18 March 1915 she rescued 28 officers and 582 men from the battleship HMS Irresistible after she struck a mine.

5 July 1915 found her on the Smyrna Patrol enforcing the blockade of the Turkish Coast from Cape Kaba to latitude 38°30'E, 200 nautical miles including Smyrna. At this time she was based at Port Iero on the Island of Mytelene.

She arrived at Skyros on 14 April 1915 with HMS Jed and HMS Kennet. Upon the arrival of the transports on the 16th she, HMS Jed and HMS Kennet pursued Turkish torpedo boat, Demir Hissar attacking the transport SS Manitou at Tribouki. The Turkish torpedo boat was driven ashore and destroyed. They shared the prize monies awarded.

On 1 January 1917 she opened fire on the Turks in Yuk Yeri Bay attempting to draw fire without success.

== Disposition ==
In 1919, she returned to Home Waters and was laid up in reserve awaiting disposal. On 4 November 1919 she was sold to Thos. W. Ward of Sheffield for breaking at Grays, Essex on the Thames Estuary.

She was awarded the Battle Honour Dardanelles 1915 - 16 for her service.

== Pennant Numbers ==
Pennant Number	From	To
N92	6 Dec 1914	1 Sep 1915
unk	1 Sep 1915	4 Nov 1919

== Bibliography ==
- Chesneau, Roger & Kolesnik, Eugene M., eds. (1979). Conway's All The World's Fighting Ships 1860–1905. London: Conway Maritime Press. ISBN 0-85177-133-5.
- Colledge, J. J.; Warlow, Ben (2006) [1969]. Ships of the Royal Navy: The Complete Record of All Fighting Ships of the Royal Navy from the 15th Century to the Present (3rd Rev ed.). London: Chatham Publishing. ISBN 978-1-86176-281-8. OCLC 67375475.
- Dittmar, F.J.; Colledge, J. J. (1972). British Warships 1914–1919. Shepperton, UK: Ian Allan. ISBN 0-7110-0380-7.
- Friedman, Norman (2009). British Destroyers: From Earliest Days to the Second World War. Barnsley, UK: Seaforth Publishing. ISBN 978-1-84832-049-9.
- Gardiner, Robert & Gray, Randal, eds. (1985). Conway's All The World's Fighting Ships 1906–1921. London: Conway Maritime Press. ISBN 0-85177-245-5.
- Manning, T. D. (1961). The British Destroyer. London: Putnam & Co. OCLC 6470051.
- March, Edgar J. (1966). British Destroyers: A History of Development, 1892–1953; Drawn by Admiralty Permission From Official Records & Returns, Ships' Covers & Building Plans. London: Seeley Service. OCLC 164893555.
- Monograph No. 21: The Mediterranean 1914–1915 (PDF). Naval Staff Monographs (Historical). Vol. VIII. The Naval Staff, Training and Staff Duties Division. 1923.
