= HMS Kennet =

Destroyer of the Royal Navy

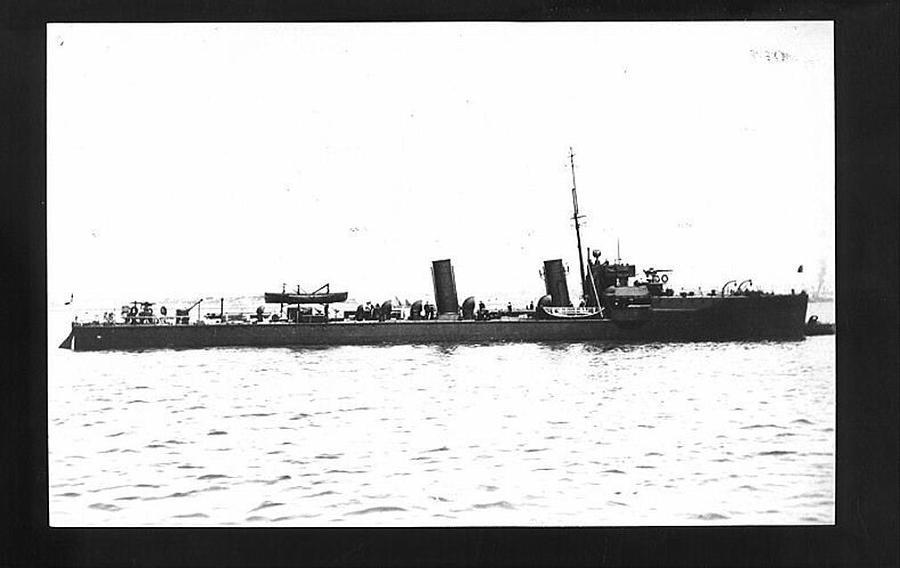
- HMS Kennet

History

United Kingdom
- Name: Kennet
- Ordered: 1902 – 1903 Naval Estimates
- Builder: John I Tornycroft Chiswick
- Laid down: 5 February 1902
- Launched: 4 December 1903
- Commissioned: 1 January 1905
- Out of service: 1919 laid up in reserve awaiting disposal
- Honours and awards: Dardanelles 1915 - 1916
- Fate: 11 December 1919 sold to J.H. Lee for breaking at Dover

General characteristics
- Class & type: Thornycroft Type River Class destroyer
- Displacement: 550 long tons (559 t) standard; 615 long tons (625 t) full load; 225 ft 9 in (68.81 m) o/a; 23 ft 10.5 in (7.277 m) Beam; 8 ft (2.4 m) Draught
- Propulsion: 4 × Thornycroft water tube boiler; 2 × Vertical Triple Expansion (VTE) steam engines driving 2 shafts producing 7,000 shp (5,200 kW) (average)
- Speed: 25.5 kn (47.2 km/h)
- Range: 127 tons coal; 1,695 nmi (3,139 km) at 11 kn (20 km/h)
- Complement: 70 officers and men
- Armament: 1 × QF 12-pounder 12 cwt Mark I, mounting P Mark I; 3 × QF 12-pounder 8 cwt, mounting G Mark I (Added in 1906); 5 × QF 6-pounder 8 cwt (removed in 1906); 2 × single tubes for 18-inch (450mm) torpedoes

Service record
- Part of: East Coast Destroyer Flotilla – 1904; China Station – 1909/10; 5th Destroyer Flotilla – Dec 1914
- Operations: World War I 1914–1918

HMS Kennet was a Thornycroft type River Class Destroyer ordered by the Royal Navy under the 1902 – 1903 Naval Estimates. Named after the River Kennet in south west England, she was the first ship to carry this name in the Royal Navy.

== Construction ==
She was laid down on 5 February 1902, at the Thornycroft shipyard at Chiswick and launched on 4 December 1903. She was completed on 1 January 1905. Her original armament was to be the same as the Turleback torpedo boat destroyers that preceded her. In 1906, the Admiralty decided to upgrade the armament by landing the five 6-pounder naval guns and shipping three 12-pounder 8 hundredweight (cwt) guns. Two would be mounted abeam at the foc's'le break, and the third gun would be mounted on the quarterdeck.

== Pre-War ==
After commissioning she was assigned to the East Coast Destroyer Flotilla of the 1st Fleet and based at Harwich.

On 7 August 1906, Kennet was struck by the destroyer Leopard in Plymouth harbour when Leopard was unsuccessfully attempting to avoid hitting a buoy. Kennet's rudder was damaged by the impact, while Leopard's hull was holed below the waterline when she struck the buoy. On 27 April 1908, the Eastern Flotilla departed Harwich for live fire and night manoeuvres. During these exercises the cruiser Attentive rammed and sank the destroyer Gala then damaged Ribble.

In 1909/1910 she was assigned to China Station.

On 30 August 1912, the Admiralty directed all destroyers were to be grouped into classes designated by letters, with the River-class becoming known officially as the E-Class. The class letters were painted on the hull below the bridge area and on one of the funnels.

== World War I ==
In July 1914, she was on China Station based at Hong Kong tendered to Triumph. She deployed with China Squadron to Tsingtao to blockade the German base. On 22 August, Kennet, under the command of Lieutenant Commander F.A. Russel, RN, was damaged in action with the German torpedo boat S90, the German gunboat SMS Jaguar and a 4-inch shore battery off Tsingtao. On 24 November 1914, after the Japanese declaration of war she returned to Hong Kong. With the fall of Tsingtao and the sinking of SMS Emden, she was redeployed to the 5th Destroyer Flotilla in the Mediterranean Fleet in November 1914, accompanying Triumph, to support the Dardanelles campaign.

She arrived at Skyros, on 14 April 1915, with Wear and Jed. Upon the arrival of the transports on 16 April, she, Wear and Jed pursued the Turkish torpedo boat Demir Hissar attacking the transport SS Manitou at Tribouki. The Turkish torpedo boat was driven ashore and destroyed. They shared the prize monies awarded.

On 24 April, she carried out a reconnaissance round the north end of Xeros Bay by Karachali and as far as Liman Bay.

On 25 April 1915, she, along with Jed, supported the landings at ANZAC Cove as part of the 3rd Division’s feint attack on Bulair.

5 July 1915, found her on the Smyrna Patrol enforcing the blockade of the Turkish Coast from Cape Kaba to Latitude 38^{o}30’E, 200 nautical miles including Smyrna. At this time she was based at Port Iero on the Island of Mytilene.

On 20 November 1915, she shelled Turkish positions on the left of the British lines at Suvla.

She remained in the Mediterranean until the end of the war.

== Disposition ==
In 1919, she returned to Home waters, was paid off and laid up in reserve awaiting disposal. On 11 December 1919, she was sold to J.H. Lee for breaking at Dover.

She was awarded the Battle Honour Dardanelles 1915 - 1916 for her service.

== Pennant Numbers ==
It is not known if she was assigned a pennant number as no record has been found.

== Bibliography ==
- Chesneau, Roger & Kolesnik, Eugene M., eds. (1979). Conway's All The World's Fighting Ships 1860–1905. London: Conway Maritime Press. ISBN 0-85177-133-5.
- Colledge, J. J.; Warlow, Ben (2006) [1969]. Ships of the Royal Navy: The Complete Record of All Fighting Ships of the Royal Navy from the 15th Century to the Present (3rd Rev ed.). London: Chatham Publishing. ISBN 978-1-86176-281-8. OCLC 67375475.
- Dittmar, F.J.; Colledge, J. J. (1972). British Warships 1914–1919. Shepperton, UK: Ian Allan. ISBN 0-7110-0380-7.
- Friedman, Norman (2009). British Destroyers: From Earliest Days to the Second World War. Barnsley, UK: Seaforth Publishing. ISBN 978-1-84832-049-9.
- Gardiner, Robert & Gray, Randal, eds. (1985). Conway's All The World's Fighting Ships 1906–1921. London: Conway Maritime Press. ISBN 0-85177-245-5.
- Manning, T. D. (1961). The British Destroyer. London: Putnam & Co. OCLC 6470051.
- March, Edgar J. (1966). British Destroyers: A History of Development, 1892–1953; Drawn by Admiralty Permission From Official Records & Returns, Ships' Covers & Building Plans. London: Seeley Service. OCLC 164893555.
