= HMS Boyne (1904) =

Destroyer of the Royal Navy

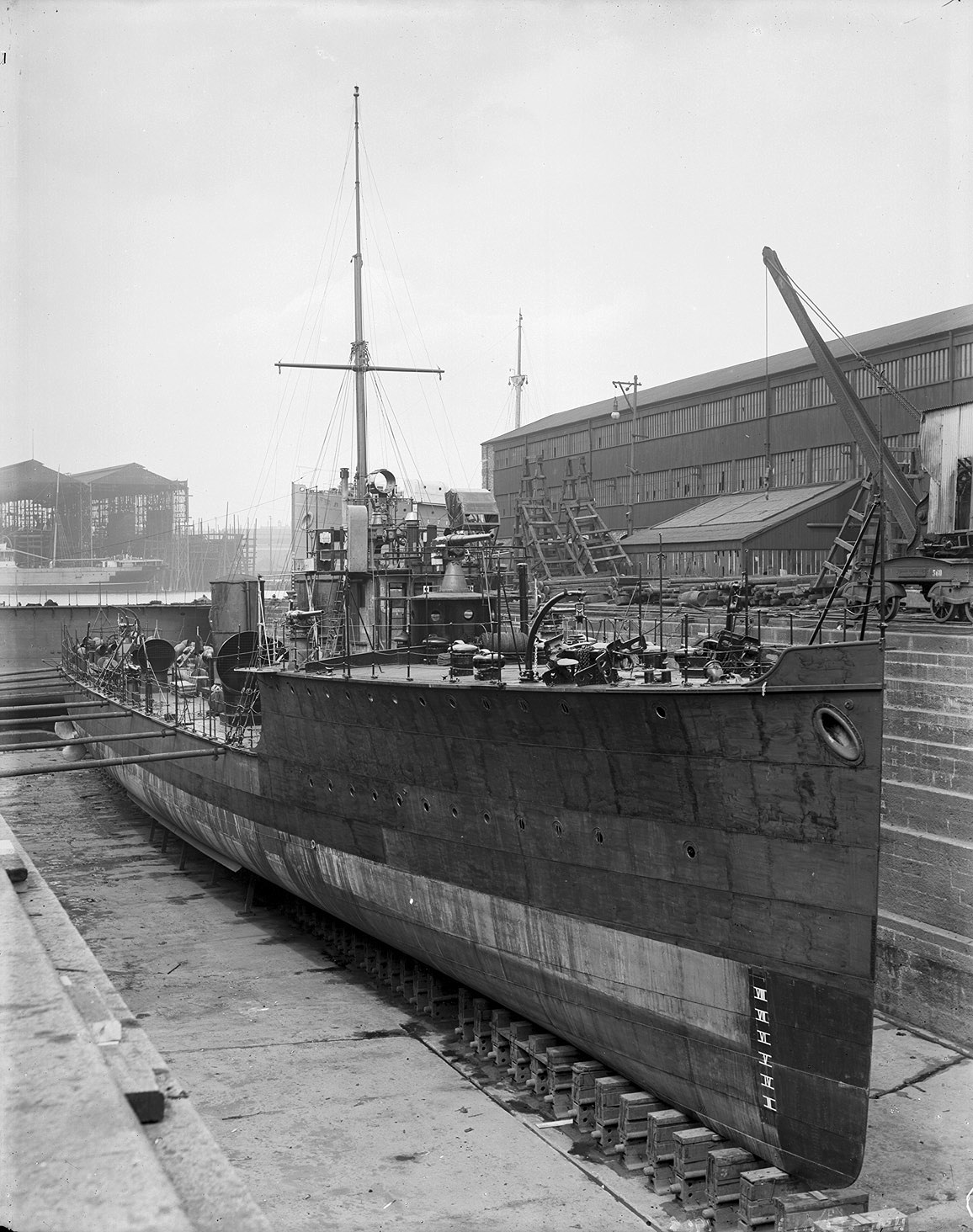
- HMS Boyne in dock

History

United Kingdom
- Name: HMS Boyne
- Ordered: 1903 – 1904 Naval Estimates
- Builder: R.W. Hawthorn Leslie and Company, Ltd, Newcastle-upon-Tyne
- Laid down: 16 June 1903
- Launched: 12 September 1904
- Commissioned: 1 May 1905
- Out of service: 1919 laid up in reserve awaiting disposal
- Fate: 30 August 1919 sold to Hayes of Porthcawl for breaking

General characteristics
- Class & type: Hawthorn Leslie Type River-class destroyer
- Displacement: 550 long tons (559 t) standard; 625 long tons (635 t) full load; 226 ft 6 in (69.04 m) o/a; 23 ft 9 in (7.24 m) beam; 7 ft 9 in (2.36 m) draught
- Installed power: 7,000 shp (5,200 kW)
- Propulsion: 4 × Yarrow type water tube boiler; 2 × vertical triple expansion steam engines; 2 × shafts
- Speed: 25.5 kn (47.2 km/h)
- Range: 140 tons coal; 1,870 nmi (3,460 km) at 11 kn (20 km/h)
- Complement: 70 officers and men
- Armament: 1 × QF 12-pounder 12 cwt Mark I, mounting P Mark I; 3 × QF 12-pounder 8 cwt, mounting G Mark I (added in 1906); 5 × QF 6-pounder 8 cwt (removed in 1906); 2 × single tubes for 18-inch (450mm) torpedoes

Service record
- Part of: East Coast Destroyer Flotilla - 1905; 3rd Destroyer Flotilla - Apr 1909; 5th Destroyer Flotilla - 1912; Assigned E class - Aug 1912 - Oct 1913; 9th Destroyer Flotilla - 1914; 7th Destroyer Flotilla - Aug 1915
- Operations: World War I 1914 - 1918

HMS Boyne was a Hawthorn Leslie type River-class destroyer ordered by the Royal Navy under the 1903 – 1904 Naval Estimates. Named after the River Boyne in Ireland, the site of the Battle of the Boyne. She was the fifth ship to carry this name since it was introduced in 1692 for a two deck ship-of-the-line.

== Construction ==
She was laid down on 16 June 1903 at the Hawthorn Leslie shipyard at Hebburn-on-Tyne and launched on 12 September 1904. She was completed on 1 May 1905. Her original armament was to be the same as the turtleback torpedo boat destroyers that preceded her. In 1906, the Admiralty decided to upgrade the armament by landing the five 6-pounder naval guns and shipping three 12-pounder 8 hundredweight guns. Two would be mounted abeam at the foc'sle break and the third gun would be mounted on the quarterdeck.

== Pre-war ==
After commissioning she was assigned to the East Coast Destroyer Flotilla of the 1st Fleet and based at Harwich.

In 1906 Boyne, still part of the First Destroyer Division, had defects repaired at Portsmouth Dockyard. On 27 April 1908 the Eastern Flotilla departed Harwich for live fire and night manoeuvres. During these exercises HMS Attentive rammed and sank HMS Gala then damaged HMS Ribble.

In April 1909 she was assigned to the 3rd Destroyer Flotilla on its formation at Harwich. She remained until displaced by a Basilisk-class destroyer by May 1912. She was assigned to the 5th Destroyer Flotilla of the 2nd Fleet with a nucleus crew.

On 30 August 1912 the Admiralty directed all destroyer classes were to be designated by alpha characters starting with the letter 'A'. The ships of the River class were assigned to the E class. After 30 September 1913, she was known as an E-class destroyer and had the letter 'E' painted on the hull below the bridge area and on either the fore or aft funnel.

== World War I ==
In early 1914 when displaced by G-class destroyers she joined the 9th Destroyer Flotilla based at Chatham tendered to HMS St George. The 9th Flotilla was a patrol flotilla tasked with anti-submarine and counter-mining patrols in the Firth of Forth area. By September, she had been re-deployed to Scapa Flow local flotilla and tendered to HMS Orion. Here she provided anti-submarine and counter mining patrols in defence of the main fleet anchorage.

In August 1915 with the amalgamation of the 9th and 7th Flotillas she was deployed to the 7th Destroyer Flotilla based at the River Humber. She remained employed on the Humber patrol participating in counter-mining operations and anti-submarine patrols for the remainder of the war.

== Disposal ==
In 1919 she was laid up in reserve awaiting disposal. On 30 August 1919 she was sold to Hayes of Porthcawl for breaking.

== Pennant numbers ==
Pennant Number	From	To
N68	6 December 1914	1 September 1915
D12	1 September 1915	13 September 1918
H23	13 September 1918	30 August 1919

== Bibliography ==
- Chesneau, Roger & Kolesnik, Eugene M., eds. (1979). Conway's All The World's Fighting Ships 1860–1905. London: Conway Maritime Press. ISBN 0-85177-133-5.
- Colledge, J. J.; Warlow, Ben (2006) [1969]. Ships of the Royal Navy: The Complete Record of All Fighting Ships of the Royal Navy from the 15th Century to the Present (3rd Rev ed.). London: Chatham Publishing. ISBN 978-1-86176-281-8. OCLC 67375475.
- Dittmar, F.J.; Colledge, J. J. (1972). British Warships 1914–1919. Shepperton, UK: Ian Allan. ISBN 0-7110-0380-7.
- Friedman, Norman (2009). British Destroyers: From Earliest Days to the Second World War. Barnsley, UK: Seaforth Publishing. ISBN 978-1-84832-049-9.
- Gardiner, Robert & Gray, Randal, eds. (1985). Conway's All The World's Fighting Ships 1906–1921. London: Conway Maritime Press. ISBN 0-85177-245-5.
- Manning, T. D. (1961). The British Destroyer. London: Putnam & Co. OCLC 6470051.
- March, Edgar J. (1966). British Destroyers: A History of Development, 1892–1953; Drawn by Admiralty Permission From Official Records & Returns, Ships' Covers & Building Plans. London: Seeley Service. OCLC 164893555.
