= HMS Welland =

Destroyer of the Royal Navy

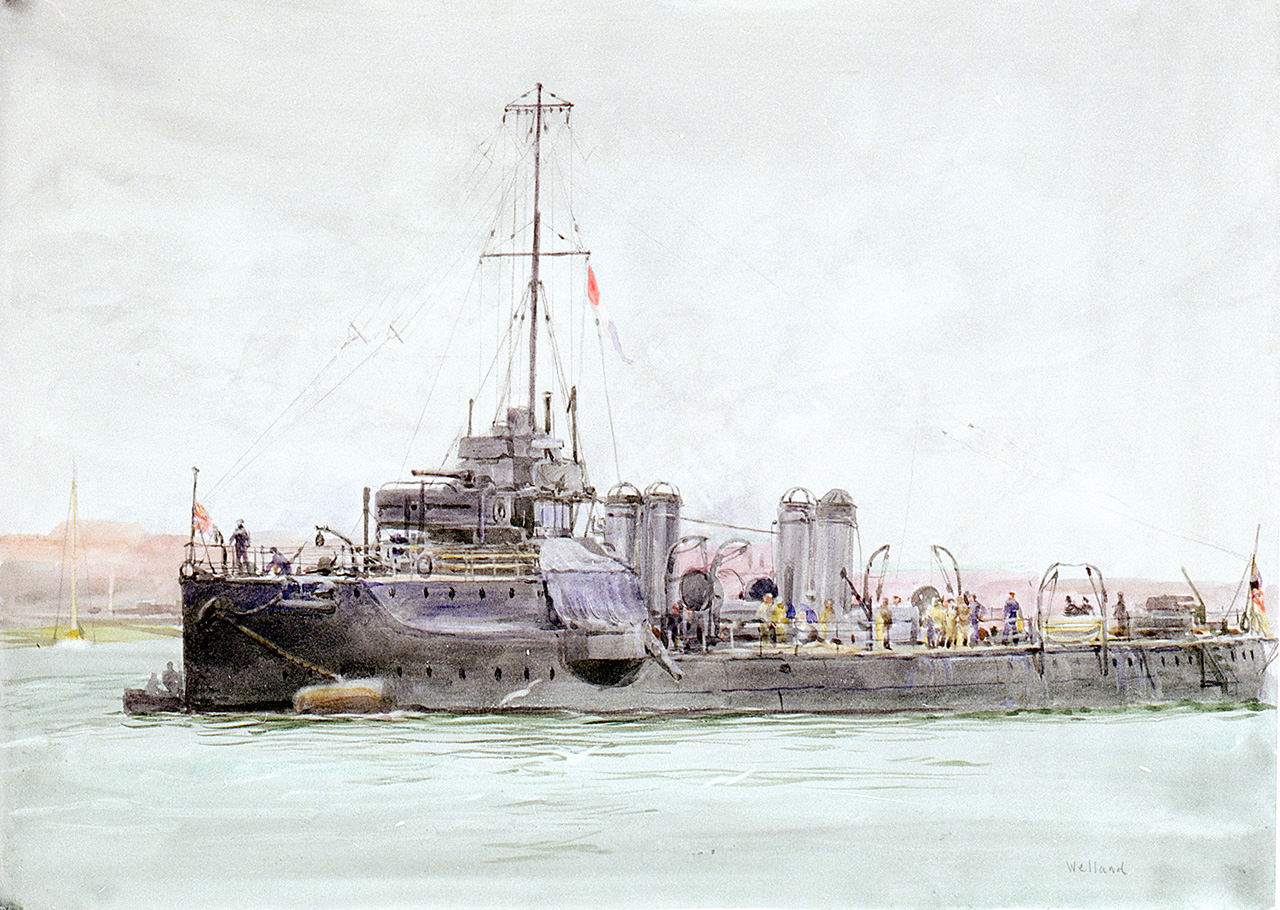
- Illustration of HMS Welland

History

United Kingdom
- Name: Welland
- Ordered: 1902 – 1903 Naval Estimates
- Builder: Yarrows, Poplar
- Laid down: 1 October 1902
- Launched: 14 April 1904
- Commissioned: July 1905
- Out of service: 1919 laid up in reserve awaiting disposal
- Honours and awards: Dardanelles 1915 - 1916
- Fate: Sold for breaking, 30 June 1920

General characteristics
- Class & type: Yarrow-type River-class destroyer
- Displacement: 590 long tons (599 t) standard; 660 long tons (671 t) full load
- Length: 231 ft 4 in (70.51 m) o/a
- Beam: 23 ft 6 in (7.16 m)
- Draught: 7 ft 2.5 in (2.197 m)
- Installed power: 7,000 shp (5,200 kW) (average)
- Propulsion: 4 × Yarrow-type water tube boilers; 2 × vertical triple-expansion steam engines; 2 shafts
- Speed: 25.5 kn (47.2 km/h)
- Range: 130 tons coal; 1,620 nmi (3,000 km) at 11 kn (20 km/h)
- Complement: 70 officers and men
- Armament: 1 × QF 12-pounder 12 cwt Mark I, mounting P Mark I; 3 × QF 12-pounder 8 cwt, mounting G Mark I (added in 1906); 5 × QF 6-pdr gun (removed in 1906); 2 × single tubes for 18-inch (450 mm) torpedoes

Service record
- Part of: East Coast Destroyer Flotilla - 1905; China Station - 1910; Assigned E Class - Aug 1912 - Oct 1913; 5th Destroyer Flotilla - December 1914
- Operations: World War I 1914 - 1918

HMS Welland was a Yarrow-built River-class destroyer ordered by the Royal Navy under the 1902 – 1903 Naval Estimates. Named after the River Welland that drains into the Wash on the English east coast, she was the first ship to carry this name in the Royal Navy.

== Construction ==
She was laid down on 1 October 1902 at the Yarrow shipyard at Poplar and launched on 14 April 1904. She was completed in July 1904. Her original armament was to be the same as the "turtleback" torpedo boat destroyers that preceded her. In 1906 the Admiralty decided to upgrade the armament by removing five 6-pounder guns and adding three 12-pounder 8 cwt guns. Two would be mounted abeam at the forecastle break and the third gun would be mounted on the quarterdeck.

== Service ==
After commissioning she was assigned to the East Coast Destroyer Flotilla of the 1st Fleet and based at Harwich. On 27 April 1908 the Eastern Flotilla departed Harwich for live fire and night manoeuvres. During these exercises HMS Attentive rammed and sank HMS Gala then damaged HMS Ribble.

In 1909/1910 she was assigned to China Station.

On 30 August 1912 the Admiralty directed that all destroyer classes were to be designated by letters. The ships of the River class were assigned to the E class and after 30 September 1913, she was known as an E-class destroyer and had the letter ‘E’ painted on the hull below the bridge area and on either the fore or aft funnel.

In July 1914 she was on the China Station based at Hong Kong tendered to HMS Triumph. She deployed with China Squadron to Qingdao to blockade the German base. After Japan entered the war on the side of the Entente Powers she returned to Hong Kong. With the fall of Qingdao and the sinking of the SMS Emden, she was redeployed to the 5th Destroyer Flotilla in the British Mediterranean Fleet in November 1914 accompanying Triumph, to support the Dardanelles Campaign.

On 25 April 1915 she was assigned to the 7th Squadron assigned to the Smyrna blockade. 5 July 1915 found her on the Smyrna Patrol enforcing the blockade of the Turkish Coast from Cape Kaba to Latitude 38^{o}30’E, 200 nautical miles including Smyrna. At this time she was based at Port Iero on the island of Lesbos.

During March 1917 she provided escort for ships between Malta and Souda. During April 1917 she was in dry dock at Malta for a refit. Following this in May 1917 she was based at Mudros to patrol the Dardanelles. She remained in the Mediterranean until the end of the war.

In 1919 she returned to home waters was paid off and laid up in reserve awaiting disposal. On 30 June 1920 she was sold to Thos. W. Ward of Sheffield for breaking at Preston.

She was awarded the battle honour "Dardanelles 1915 - 1916" for her service.

== Bibliography ==
- Chesneau, Roger & Kolesnik, Eugene M., eds. (1979). Conway's All The World's Fighting Ships 1860–1905. London: Conway Maritime Press. ISBN 0-85177-133-5.
- Colledge, J. J.; Warlow, Ben (2006) [1969]. Ships of the Royal Navy: The Complete Record of All Fighting Ships of the Royal Navy from the 15th Century to the Present (3rd Rev ed.). London: Chatham Publishing. ISBN 978-1-86176-281-8. OCLC 67375475.
- Dittmar, F.J.; Colledge, J. J. (1972). British Warships 1914–1919. Shepperton, UK: Ian Allan. ISBN 0-7110-0380-7.
- Friedman, Norman (2009). British Destroyers: From Earliest Days to the Second World War. Barnsley, UK: Seaforth Publishing. ISBN 978-1-84832-049-9.
- Gardiner, Robert & Gray, Randal, eds. (1985). Conway's All The World's Fighting Ships 1906–1921. London: Conway Maritime Press. ISBN 0-85177-245-5.
- Manning, T. D. (1961). The British Destroyer. London: Putnam & Co. OCLC 6470051.
- March, Edgar J. (1966). British Destroyers: A History of Development, 1892–1953; Drawn by Admiralty Permission From Official Records & Returns, Ships' Covers & Building Plans. London: Seeley Service. OCLC 164893555.
