= HMS Usk (1903) =

Destroyer of the Royal Navy

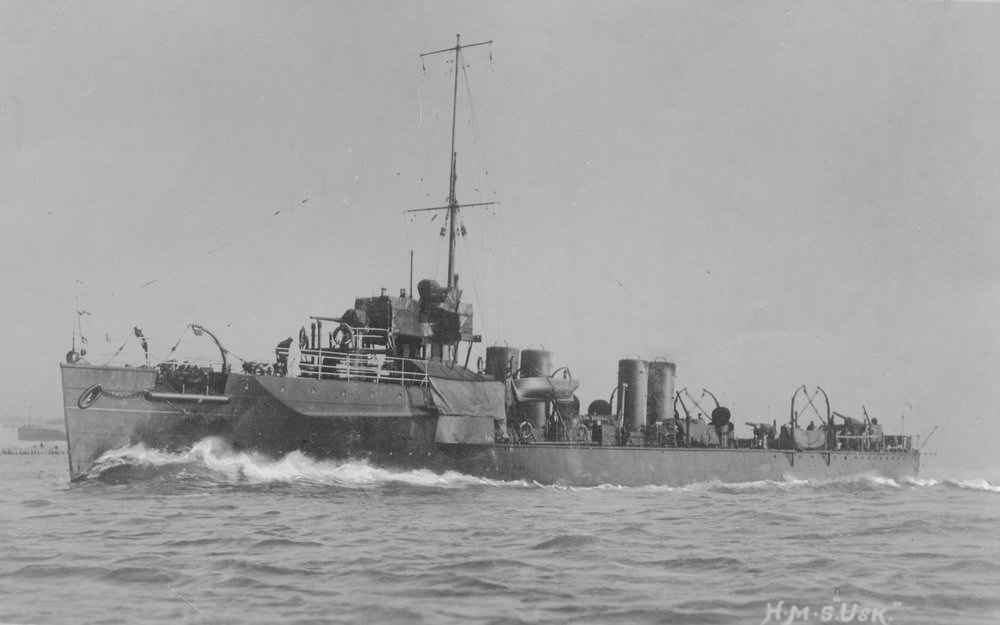
- HMS Usk

History

United Kingdom
- Name: Usk
- Ordered: 1901 – 1902 Naval Estimates
- Builder: Yarrows, Poplar
- Laid down: 30 July 1902
- Launched: 25 July 1903
- Commissioned: March 1904
- Out of service: 1919 laid up in reserve awaiting disposal
- Honours and awards: Dardanelles 1915 - 1916
- Fate: 29 July 1920 sold to Thos. W. Ward of Sheffield for breaking at Morecombe, Lancashire

General characteristics
- Class & type: Yarrow Type River Class destroyer
- Displacement: 590 long tons (599 t) standard; 660 long tons (671 t) full load; 231 ft 4 in (70.51 m) o/a; 23 ft 6 in (7.16 m) Beam; 7 ft 2.5 in (2.197 m) Draught
- Propulsion: 4 × Yarrow type water tube boiler; 2 × Vertical triple expansion (VTE) steam engines driving two shafts producing 7,000 shp (5,200 kW) (average)
- Speed: 25.5 kn (47.2 km/h)
- Range: 130 tons coal; 1,620 nmi (3,000 km) at 11 kn (20 km/h)
- Complement: 70 officers and men
- Armament: 1 × QF 12-pounder 12 cwt Mark I, mounting P Mark I; 3 × QF 12-pounder 8 cwt, mounting G Mark I (Added in 1906); 5 × QF 6-pounder 8 cwt (removed in 1906); 2 × single tubes for 18-inch (450mm) torpedoes

Service record
- Part of: East Coast Destroyer Flotilla - 1905; China Station - 1910; Assigned E Class - Aug 1912 - Oct 1913; 5th Destroyer Flotilla - December 1914
- Operations: World War I 1914 - 1918

HMS Usk was a Yarrow type River Class destroyer ordered by the Royal Navy under the 1901 – 1902 Naval Estimates. Named after the River Usk in Wales flowing through Newport, she was the first ship to carry this name in the Royal Navy.

== Construction ==
She was laid down on 30 July 1902, at the Yarrow shipyard at Poplar, and launched on 25 July 1903. She was completed in March 1904. Her original armament was to be the same as the Turleback torpedo boat destroyers that preceded her. In 1906, the Admiralty decided to upgrade the armament by landing the five six-pounder naval guns and shipping three 12-pounder eight hundredweight (cwt) guns. Two would be mounted abeam at the foc'sle break and the third gun would be mounted on the quarterdeck.

== Pre-war ==
After commissioning, she was assigned to the East Coast Destroyer Flotilla of the 1st Fleet and based at Harwich.

On 27 April 1908, the Eastern Flotilla departed Harwich for live fire and night manoeuvres. During these exercises the cruiser Attentive rammed and sank the destroyer Gala then damaged Ribble.

In 1909-1910 she was assigned to China Station.

On 30 August 1912, the Admiralty directed all destroyer classes were to be designated by alpha characters starting with the letter A. The ships of the River Class were assigned to the E Class. After 30 September 1913, she was known as an E Class destroyer and had the letter E painted on the hull below the bridge area and on either the fore or aft funnel.

== First World War ==
In July 1914, she was on China Station based at Hong Kong tendered to HMS Triumph. She deployed with China Squadron to Tsingtao to blockade the German base. After the Japanese declaration of war, she remained off Tsingtao until the fall of Tsingtao in November 1914.

With the fall of Tsingtao and the sinking of the SMS Emden, she was redeployed to the 5th Destroyer Flotilla in the Mediterranean Fleet in November 1914, accompanying HMS Triumph, to support the Dardanelles campaign.

On 25 April 1915, under the command of Lieutenant Commander W. G. C. Maxwell, she supported the landings at ANZAC Cove.

On 22 May 1915, she escorted HMS Canopus from Malta to Mudros.

10 February 1916, found her on the Smyrna Patrol, enforcing the blockade of the Turkish coast from Cape Kaba to latitude 38° 30′ E, 200 nautical miles including Smyrna. At this time she was based at Port Iero on the Island of Mytelene.

On 17 and 18 February 1916, she was involved in operations at Khios. She remained in the Mediterranean until the end of the war.

== Disposition ==
In 1919 she returned to home waters, was paid off and laid up in reserve, awaiting disposal. On 29 July 1920, she was sold to Thos. W. Ward of Sheffield for breaking at Morecambe, Lancashire.

She was awarded the Battle Honour Dardanelles 1915 - 1916 for her service.

== Pennant numbers ==
It is not known if she was assigned a pennant number as no record has been found.

== Bibliography ==
- Chesneau, Roger & Kolesnik, Eugene M., eds. (1979). Conway's All The World's Fighting Ships 1860–1905. London: Conway Maritime Press. ISBN 0-85177-133-5.
- Colledge, J. J.; Warlow, Ben (2006) [1969]. Ships of the Royal Navy: The Complete Record of All Fighting Ships of the Royal Navy from the 15th Century to the Present (3rd Rev ed.). London: Chatham Publishing. ISBN 978-1-86176-281-8. OCLC 67375475.
- Dittmar, F.J.; Colledge, J. J. (1972). British Warships 1914–1919. Shepperton, UK: Ian Allan. ISBN 0-7110-0380-7.
- Friedman, Norman (2009). British Destroyers: From Earliest Days to the Second World War. Barnsley, UK: Seaforth Publishing. ISBN 978-1-84832-049-9.
- Gardiner, Robert & Gray, Randal, eds. (1985). Conway's All The World's Fighting Ships 1906–1921. London: Conway Maritime Press. ISBN 0-85177-245-5.
- Manning, T. D. (1961). The British Destroyer. London: Putnam & Co. OCLC 6470051.
- March, Edgar J. (1966). British Destroyers: A History of Development, 1892–1953; Drawn by Admiralty Permission From Official Records & Returns, Ships' Covers & Building Plans. London: Seeley Service. OCLC 164893555.
