= HMS Blackwater (1903) =

Destroyer of the Royal Navy

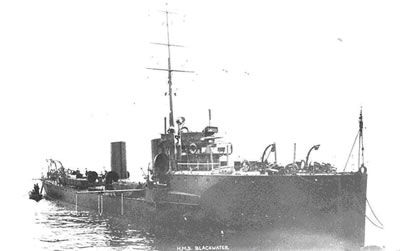
- HMS Blackwater in 1905

History

United Kingdom
- Name: HMS Blackwater
- Ordered: 1902–1903 Naval Estimates
- Builder: Cammell Laird, Birkenhead
- Laid down: 27 August 1902
- Launched: 25 July 1903
- Commissioned: March 1904
- Fate: Sank after a collision, 6 April 1909

General characteristics
- Class & type: Laird-type River-class destroyer
- Displacement: 550 long tons (559 t) standard; 625 long tons (635 t) full load; 226 ft 6 in (69.04 m) o/a; 23 ft 9 in (7.24 m) Beam; 7 ft 9 in (2.36 m) Draught
- Propulsion: 4 × Yarrow type water tube boiler; 2 × Vertical Triple Expansion (VTE) steam engines driving 2 shafts producing 7,000 shp (5,200 kW) (average)
- Speed: 25.5 kn (47.2 km/h)
- Range: 140 tons coal; 1,870 nmi (3,460 km) at 11 kn (20 km/h)
- Complement: 70 officers and men
- Armament: 1 × QF 12-pounder 12 cwt Mark I, mounting P Mark I; 3 × QF 12-pounder 8 cwt, mounting G Mark I (Added in 1906); 5 × QF 6-pounder 8 cwt (removed in 1906); 2 × single tubes for 18-inch (450mm) torpedoes

Service record
- Part of: East Coast Destroyer Flotilla (1905); 3rd Destroyer Flotilla (April 1909)

HMS Blackwater was a Laird-type River-class destroyer ordered by the Royal Navy under the 1902–1903 Naval Estimates. Named after the River Blackwater in southern England near London she was the first ship to carry this name in the Royal Navy.

== Construction ==
She was laid down on 27 August 1902 at the Cammell Laird shipyard at Birkenhead and launched on 25 July 1903. She was completed in March 1904. Her original armament was to be the same as the turtleback torpedo boat destroyers that preceded her. In 1906 the Admiralty decided to upgrade the armament by landing the five 6-pounder naval guns and shipping three 12-pounder 8 hundredweight (cwt) guns. Two would be mounted abeam at the fo'c's'le break and the third gun would be mounted on the quarterdeck.

== Pre-War ==
After commissioning she was assigned to the East Coast Destroyer Flotilla of the 1st Fleet and based at Harwich.

On 27 April 1908 the Eastern Flotilla departed Harwich for live fire and night manoeuvres. During these exercises HMS Attentive rammed and sank HMS Gala, then damaged HMS Ribble.

In April 1909 she was assigned to the 3rd Destroyer Flotilla on its formation at Harwich.

== Loss ==
On 6 April 1909 Blackwater collided with the merchantman SS Hero, and sank off Dungeness in the English Channel at position 50°55′21″N 1°6′10″E.

She was not awarded a battle honour for her service.

== Pennant Numbers ==
She was assigned a pennant number during her career.

== Bibliography ==
- Chesneau, Roger & Kolesnik, Eugene M., eds. (1979). Conway's All The World's Fighting Ships 1860–1905. London: Conway Maritime Press. ISBN 0-85177-133-5.
- Colledge, J. J.; Warlow, Ben (2006) [1969]. Ships of the Royal Navy: The Complete Record of All Fighting Ships of the Royal Navy from the 15th Century to the Present (3rd Rev ed.). London: Chatham Publishing. ISBN 978-1-86176-281-8. OCLC 67375475.
- Dittmar, F.J.; Colledge, J. J. (1972). British Warships 1914–1919. Shepperton, UK: Ian Allan. ISBN 0-7110-0380-7.
- Friedman, Norman (2009). British Destroyers: From Earliest Days to the Second World War. Barnsley, UK: Seaforth Publishing. ISBN 978-1-84832-049-9.
- Gardiner, Robert & Gray, Randal, eds. (1985). Conway's All The World's Fighting Ships 1906–1921. London: Conway Maritime Press. ISBN 0-85177-245-5.
- Manning, T. D. (1961). The British Destroyer. London: Putnam & Co. OCLC 6470051.
- March, Edgar J. (1966). British Destroyers: A History of Development, 1892–1953; Drawn by Admiralty Permission From Official Records & Returns, Ships' Covers & Building Plans. London: Seeley Service. OCLC 164893555.
