= River-class destroyer (1903) =

1903 class of British destroyers

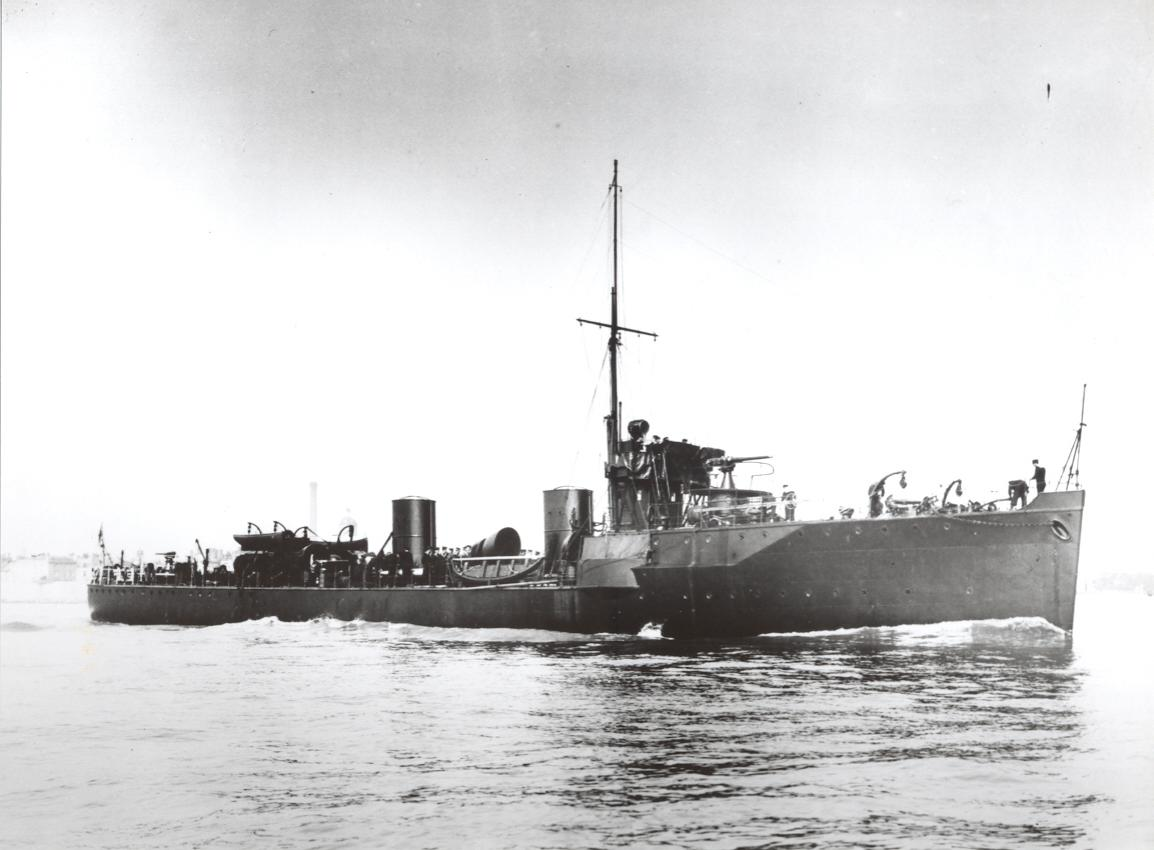
- HMS Eden, an early River-class destroyer, was unusual in being driven by steam turbines.

Class overview
- Name: River or E class
- Operators: Royal Navy
- Preceded by: B class; C class; D class
- Succeeded by: Tribal or F class
- Built: 1903–1905
- In commission: 1903–1920
- Completed: 36
- Lost: 8

General characteristics
- Type: Destroyer
- Displacement: 535 long tons (544 t) to 570 long tons (580 t)
- Length: 221 ft (67 m) to 233 ft (71 m) (overall)
- Beam: 23 ft 6 in (7.16 m) to 23 ft 10.5 in (7.277 m)
- Draught: 7 ft 1 in (2.16 m)to 8 ft 0.5 in (2.451 m)
- Propulsion: 2 vertical triple expansion steam engines; 2 shafts; Except Eden, Stour and Test: 2 Parsons steam turbines; 2 shafts; 7,000 ihp (5,200 kW) to 7,700 ihp (5,700 kW)
- Speed: 25.5 knots (29.3 mph; 47.2 km/h)
- Range: 1,620 nmi (3,000 km) to 1,870 nmi (3,460 km) at 11 kn, except Stour and Test, 3,000 nmi (5,556 km) at 13 kn.
- Complement: 70
- Armament: As designed: 1 × QF 12 pdr 12 cwt Mark I on pedestal mountings P Mark I; 5 × QF 6-pdr 8 cwt naval gun; 2 × single tubes for 18-inch (450-mm) torpedoes

The River-class destroyer (re-designated in 1913 as the E class) was a class of torpedo boat destroyer built for the Royal Navy in the first few years of the 20th century, and which saw extensive service in World War I. These 37 vessels (33 formally ordered under three annual construction programmes, plus another three built on speculation and then purchased by the Admiralty, and a final unit building in Italy for the Portuguese Navy and purchased in 1915) were all constructed to disparate builders' designs, just like the preceding classes.

The class introduced new features to destroyer design, placing a greater emphasis on seakeeping and endurance and less on a high maximum speed in good weather. All the ships were named after British, Irish and Portuguese rivers, and as such were the first Royal Navy destroyer class to be named systematically.

== Genesis ==
The concept for the River class began in December 1900, with a request from Commander John Michael de Robeck, then the senior destroyer officer in the Mediterranean Fleet, for a new class of destroyer with a longer range and better sea-keeping qualities than the existing "27-knotter" class (the survivors of which would be redesignated the A-class in 1913) and "30-knotter" class (redesignated the B, C and, D classes in 1913). De Robeck's specification called for a range of 1,650 nmi (3,056 km) at a sustained speed of 18 knots (33 km/h); the "30-knotter" could only make 1,400 nmi (2,593 km) at its cruising speed of 13 knots (24 km/h).

De Robeck also called for various modifications to destroyer design to help make ships more seaworthy, in particular keeping up their speed in adverse weather conditions. The most noticeable change would be to introduce a raised forecastle rather than an arched turtleback (Note: A turtleback is an arched structure over the deck of a ship, normally at the ship's bow, to protect against reach seas.) for the hull forward of the bridge, and that the bridge should be placed further aft to keep it clear of spray from waves breaking over the bow. Furthermore, he felt that destroyers should run their speed trials with a more realistic load of fuel and supplies. The "30-knotter" type might have a nominal speed of 30 knots, but even in very good weather this was never achieved in service.

Other officers serving on Royal Navy destroyers made similar observations about their ships. John de Robeck's commanding officer, Vice-Admiral "Jackie" Fisher, drew a comparison with the German S90-class torpedo boat, which had impressed Royal Navy officers who had seen it.

In July 1901 the Director of Naval Construction worked on sketch designs for future destroyers, which included many of the features de Robeck and his colleagues advocated, as well as a heavier and more reliable kind of engine. The trials speed was initially 27 knots (50 km/h), though further requirements for increased strength reduced the speed to 25.5 knots (47.2 km/h). While this speed seemed like a significant reduction, it would be measured with a realistic 95 tons of coal loaded on board, and the better sea-keeping properties meant that the new ships would perform better than a "30-knotter" in any seas except for a flat calm.

== Design ==
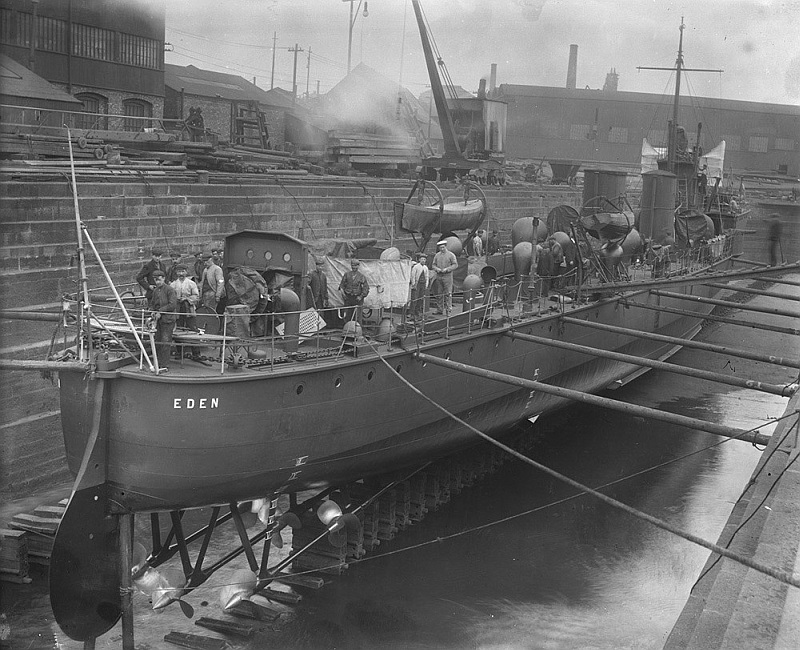
View at stern and the three propeller shafts of HMS Eden, 1904 laying in the dry dock

As with other early British destroyer classes, the Admiralty invited specialist private firms to submit their own designs for destroyers which would meet the specification. The idea was to use the builders' knowledge of building small, fast, ships to help cram powerful machinery into a small hull. For this reason, details of the hull and internal arrangements differed between ships in the class.

Nevertheless, the River class can clearly be distinguished from previous destroyers because of its raised forecastle. Previous British designs had a low "turtle-back" forecastle, which, although intended to clear the bows, caused them to dig in to the sea, resulting in a very wet conning position. The bridge was also further back than in previous destroyer models.

All ships were coal fired (except Arno which was oil-fired), and all had triple expansion steam engines except for four; Eden, Stour, Test and Arno were powered by steam turbines. Eden was given turbines to test their viability for future destroyer classes, with two propellers on each of her three shafts, to transmit the power at the high revolutions of the direct drive turbines, a feature of the earlier Turbinia.

By 1906 the Russo-Japanese War had shown that the 6-pounder gun was insufficiently effective, so the five 6-pounders in this class were replaced by three additional 12-pounders, creating an "all big gun" armament.

== Performance ==
With a general increase in size and more solid construction, the Rivers became the first truly oceangoing and useful torpedo boat destroyers in Royal Navy service.

Despite making only 25 knots (previous classes had made 27 to 30 knots (50 to 56 km/h) under the most favourable conditions), the increased seaworthiness meant that they could maintain this speed into a sea and that they remained workable and fightable at the same time. Notwithstanding a variety of design differences, all ships had either two broad funnels or two pairs of narrow funnels.

== Ships ==
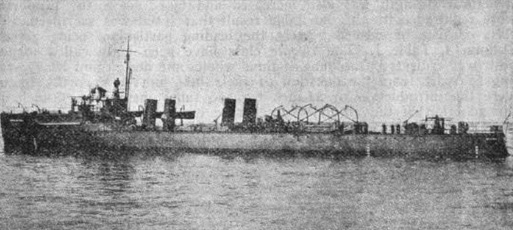
HMS Welland

Thirty-three ships were ordered - ten ships under the 1901-02 Programme, eight ships under the 1902-03 Programme, and fifteen ships under the 1903-04 Programme. A further fourteen orders were projected under the draft 1904-05 Programme, but one vessel built by Palmers on speculation in 1902 was instead purchased for the Navy, and the other intended orders were never placed. Two additional vessels (likewise built on speculation by Cammell Laird in 1904–05) were purchased in December 1909 under the 1908-09 Programme, and a similar vessel building in Genoa for the Portuguese Navy was purchased by the Admiralty in 1915 following the outbreak of war.

Apart from the Gala and Blackwater (both lost by accidents in 1908 and 1909 respectively), all these ships were re-designated as the 'E' class in 1913 (including Arno in 1915) and saw service during World War 1, when seven of them were sunk. The 28 ships surviving the war were all sold out of service and scrapped by late 1920.

Name	Builder	Laid down	Launch date	Completed	Fate
1901-02 Programme
Derwent	R. W. Hawthorn Leslie & Company, Hebburn	12 June 1902	14 February 1903	July 1904.	Mined and sunk off Le Havre 2 May 1917.
Eden	R. W. Hawthorn Leslie & Company, Hebburn	12 June 1902	13 March 1903,	June 1904.	Rammed and sunk by SS France in English Channel 18 June 1916.
Erne	Palmers Shipbuilding and Iron Company, Jarrow	3 July 1902	14 January 1903	February 1904.	Wrecked off Rattray Head 6 February 1915.
Ettrick	Palmers Shipbuilding and Iron Company, Jarrow	9 July 1902	28 February 1904	February 1904.	Sold for breaking up 27 May 1919.
Exe	Palmers Shipbuilding and Iron Company, Jarrow	14 July 1902	27 April 1903	March 1904.	Sold for breaking up 10 February 1920.
Ribble	Yarrow & Co., Poplar	4 July 1902	19 March 1904	June 1904.	Sold for breaking up 29 July 1920.
Teviot	Yarrow & Co., Poplar	10 July 1902	7 November 1903	April 1904.	Sold for breaking up 23 June 1919.
Usk	Yarrow & Co., Poplar	30 July 1902	25 July 1903	March 1904.	Sold for breaking up 29 July 1920.
Foyle	Laird Brothers,^{(a)} Birkenhead	15 August 1902	25 February 1903	March 1904.	Mined and sunk in Straits of Dover 15 March 1917.
Itchen	Laird Brothers, Birkenhead	18 August 1902	17 March 1903	January 1904.	Torpedoed and sunk by U-boat U-99 in the North Sea 6 July 1917.
1902-03 Programme
Arun	Laird Brothers, Birkenhead	17 August 1902	29 April 1903	February 1904.	Sold for breaking up 30 June 1920.
Blackwater	Laird Brothers, Birkenhead	27 August 1902	25 July 1903	March 1904.	Sunk in collision with SS Hero 6 April 1909 off Dungeness.
Welland	Yarrow & Co., Poplar	1 October 1902	14 April 1904	July 1904.	Sold for breaking up 30 June 1920.
Waveney	R. W. Hawthorn Leslie & Company, Hebburn	20 October 1902	16 March 1903	14 June 1904.	Sold for breaking up 10 February 1920.
Kennet	John I. Thornycroft & Company, Chiswick	5 December 1902	4 December 1903	January 1905.	Sold for breaking up 11 December 1919.
Jed	John I. Thornycroft & Company, Chiswick	27 February 1903	16 February 1904	January 1905.	Sold for breaking up 29 July 1920.
Cherwell	Palmers Shipbuilding and Iron Company, Jarrow	20 January 1903	23 July 1903	March 1904.	Sold for breaking up 23 June 1919.
Dee	Palmers Shipbuilding and Iron Company, Jarrow	5 March 1903	10 September 1903	May 1904.	Sold for breaking up 23 July 1919.
Rother ^{(b)}	Palmers Shipbuilding and Iron Company, Jarrow	23 March 1903	5 January 1904	May 1905.	Sold for breaking up 23 June 1919.

Note: (a) Laird Brothers were taken over by steelmakers Cammell in 1903, and were renamed Cammell Laird & Co.
(b) Rother was not ordered under the 1902-03 Programme; Palmers laid down 3 ships to the same design in early 1903, but only received orders for two ships, the third ship being built on speculation; this was purchased by the Admiralty in 1904 in lieu of one of the 143 orders projected under the 1904-05 Programme, and was named Rother.

A major distinction in appearance between the ships on the 1901–02 and 1902-03 Programmes on one hand and the ships of the 1903-04 Programme on the other hand is that the former were completed with the forward pair of 6-pdr guns mounted on sponsons extending outwards from the ship's sides (abreast of the bridge). With the 1903-04 Programme these sponsons were deleted, the high forecastle was extended back as far as the bridge and the two foremost 6-pdr guns were mounted directly on the two sides of the forecastle immediately forward of the bridge. The same change was subsequently retro-fitted into the earlier batches.

Name	Builder	Laid down	Launch date	Completed	Fate
1903-04 Programme
Boyne	R. W. Hawthorn Leslie & Company, Hebburn	16 February 1904	12 September 1904	May 1905.	Sold for breaking up 30 August 1919.
Doon	R. W. Hawthorn Leslie & Company, Hebburn	16 February 1904	8 November 1904	June 1905.	Sold for breaking up 27 May 1920.
Kale	R. W. Hawthorn Leslie & Company, Hebburn	16 February 1904	8 November 1904	August 1905.	Mined and sunk in North Sea 27 March 1918.
Swale	Palmers Shipbuilding and Iron Company, Jarrow	23 February 1904	20 April 1905	September 1905.	Sold for breaking up 23 June 1919.
Ure	Palmers Shipbuilding and Iron Company, Jarrow	1 March 1904	25 October 1904	June 1905.	Sold for breaking up 27 May 1919.
Wear	Palmers Shipbuilding and Iron Company, Jarrow	7 March 1904	21 January 1905	August 1905.	Sold for breaking up 4 November 1919.
Liffey	Cammell Laird & Company, Birkenhead	22 March 1904	23 September 1904	May 1905.	Sold for breaking up 2 June 1919.
Moy	Cammell Laird & Company, Birkenhead	22 March 1904	10 November 1904	June 1905.	Sold for breaking up 27 May 1919.
Ouse	Cammell Laird & Company, Birkenhead	22 March 1904	7 January 1905	September 1905.	Sold for breaking up 22 October 1919.
Gala	Yarrow & Co., Poplar	1 February 1904	7 January 1905	1905.	Collided with HMS Attentive and sank 27 April 1908 off Harwich.
Garry	Yarrow & Co., Poplar	25 April 1904	31 March 1905	September 1905.	Sold for breaking up 22 October 1920.
Chelmer	John I. Thornycroft & Company, Chiswick	11 February 1904	8 December 1904	June 1905.	Sold for breaking up 30 June 1920.
Colne	John I. Thornycroft & Company, Chiswick	21 March 1904	21 May 1905	July 1905.	Sold for breaking up 4 November 1919.
Ness	J. Samuel White, Cowes	5 May 1904	5 January 1905	August 1905.	Sold for breaking up 27 May 1919.
Nith	J. Samuel White, Cowes	5 May 1904	7 March 1905	October 1905.	Sold for breaking up 23 June 1919.
Later purchases
Stour ^{(c)}	Cammell Laird & Company, Birkenhead	5 December 1904	3 June 1905	March 1910.	Sold for breaking up 30 August 1919.
Test ^{(c)}	Cammell Laird & Company, Birkenhead	5 December 1904	6 May 1905	March 1910.	Sold for breaking up 30 August 1919.
Arno ^{(d)}	Giovanni Ansaldo & Co, Genoa	unknown	22 December 1914	June 1915.	Sunk off the Dardanelles in collision with the destroyer Hope 30 August 1919.

Note: (c) Stour and Test were not ordered under the 1903-04 Programme but were built concurrently by Cammell Laird on speculation; these were purchased by the Admiralty in December 1909, completed and named Stour and Test.
(d) building as Portuguese Liz pre-war, but purchased by the Admiralty in March 1915 prior to completion, and renamed for the river Arno in Portugal.

As all of these vessels were designed and constructed by their shipbuilders to their own company designs, they differed in detail and in appearance. Even ships built at different times by the individual builders would differ from year to year, not least the ships built in 1903-04 and later after the deletion of the sponsons from the designs.

- Hawthorn Leslie type; all built by Hawthorn Leslie, Hebburn, Newcastle upon Tyne, featuring two short funnels.
  - Derwent
  - Eden
  - Waveney
  - Boyne
  - Doon
  - Kale
- Palmer type; all built by Palmers Shipbuilding and Iron Company, Jarrow, featuring four funnels closely paired.
  - Erne
  - Ettrick
  - Exe
  - Cherwell
  - Dee
  - Rother
  - Swale
  - Ure
  - Wear
- Yarrow type; all built by Yarrow Shipbuilders, Poplar, London, featuring four funnels openly paired and with no raised piece in the eyes.
  - Ribble
  - Teviot
  - Usk
  - Welland
  - Gala
  - Garry
- Laird type; all built by Laird Brothers (from 1903 Cammell Laird), Birkenhead, including two ships built on speculation and purchased by the Royal Navy; they featured two medium funnels.
  - Foyle
  - Itchen
  - Arun
  - Blackwater
  - Liffey
  - Moy
  - Ouse
  - Stour
  - Test
- Thornycroft type; all built by J I Thornycroft, Chiswick, and featuring two high funnels.
  - Kennet
  - Jed
  - Chelmer
  - Colne
- White type; both built by J. Samuel White, Cowes, which had two short funnels.
  - Ness
  - Nith
- Ansaldo type; built by Giovanni Ansaldo & Co, Genoa, featuring two medium funnels.
  - Arno
