= 9th Destroyer Flotilla =

- Active: January 1913-December, 1925, January–July 1940
- Country: United Kingdom
- Branch: Royal Navy
- Size: Flotilla

The 9th Destroyer Flotilla, or Ninth Destroyer Flotilla, was a military formation of the British Royal Navy from January 1913 to December 1925 and again in January to July 1940.

== History ==
Established in January 1913 when it was assigned to the Patrols Command it was based at Chatham. During World War I it remained on Patrolling Duties until 1918. During the inter-war years it was reassigned to the Mediterranean Fleet from 1922 to 1925 it placed in the Atlantic Fleet Reserve and then deactivated. It was reformed during World War II in January 1940 as part of the Home Fleet destroyer flotillas command until July 1940 when it was disbanded.

== Administration ==
=== Captains (D) afloat, 9th Destroyer Flotilla ===
Captain (D) afloat is a Royal Navy appointment of an operational commander of a destroyer flotilla or squadron.

== Sources ==
- Halpern, Paul (2016). The Mediterranean Fleet, 1919–1929. Cambridge, England: Routledge. ISBN 9781317024163.
- Watson, Dr Graham. (2015) "Royal Navy Organization and Ship Deployments 1900-1914". www.naval-history.net. Gordon Smith.
- Watson, Dr Graham. (2015) "Royal Navy Organization and Ship Deployment, Inter-War Years 1914-1918". www.naval-history.net. Gordon Smith.
- Watson, Dr Graham. (2015) "Royal Navy Organization in World War 2, 1939-1945". www.naval-history.net. Gordon Smith.
- Whitby, Michael (2011). Commanding Canadians: The Second World War Diaries of A.F.C. Layard. Vancouver, Canada: UBC Press. ISBN 9780774840378.
