= HMS Ouse =

Destroyer of the Royal Navy

History

United Kingdom
- Name: Ouse
- Ordered: 1903 – 1904 Naval Estimates
- Builder: Cammell Laird, Birkenhead
- Laid down: 22 March 1904
- Launched: 7 January 1905
- Commissioned: September 1905
- Out of service: Laid up in reserve 1919
- Fate: 22 October 1919 sold to J.H. Lee for breaking

General characteristics
- Class & type: Laird-type River-class destroyer
- Displacement: 550 long tons (559 t) standard; 625 long tons (635 t) full load
- Length: 226 ft 6 in (69.04 m) o/a
- Beam: 23 ft 9 in (7.24 m)
- Draught: 7 ft 9 in (2.36 m)
- Propulsion: 4 × Yarrow type water tube boilers; 2 × vertical triple-expansion steam engines driving 2 shafts producing 7,000 shp (5,200 kW) average
- Speed: 25.5 kn (47.2 km/h)
- Range: 140 tons coal; 1,870 nmi (3,460 km) at 11 kn (20 km/h)
- Complement: 70 officers and men
- Armament: 1 × QF 12-pounder 12 cwt Mark I, mounting P Mark I; 3 × QF 12-pounder 8-cwt Mk I naval gun, mounting G Mark I (added in 1906); 5 × QF 6-pdr 8 cwt naval gun (removed in 1906); 2 × single tubes for 18-inch (450 mm) torpedoes

Service record
- Part of: East Coast Destroyer Flotilla - 1905; 3rd Destroyer Flotilla - Apr 1909; 5th Destroyer Flotilla - 1912; Assigned E Class - Aug 1912 - Oct 1913; 9th Destroyer Flotilla - 1914; 7th Destroyer Flotilla - Aug 1915
- Operations: World War I 1914 – 1918
- Victories: UC-70 – 28 Aug 1918; UB-115 – 29 Sep 1918

HMS Ouse was a Laird type River-class destroyer ordered by the Royal Navy under the 1903 – 1904 Naval Estimates. Named after the River Ouse in north east England near the city of York, she was the first ship to carry this name in the Royal Navy.

== Design and construction ==
Ouse was one of three River-class destroyers ordered from Cammel Laird as part of the 1903–04 construction programme, (Note: The other two were Liffey and Moy) with 16 River-class ships ordered in total under that programme. The destroyers ordered from Lairds under the 1903–04 programme were repeats of those built by Lairds under the 1901–02 programme (Note: Foyle and Itchen) and the 1902–03 programme (Note: Arun and Blackwater).

Ouse was 226 ft 9 in (69.11 m) long overall (o/a) and 220 ft 0 in (67.06 m) between perpendiculars (pp), with a beam of 23 ft 9 in (7.24 m) and a draught of 9 ft 6 in (2.90 m). Displacement was 550 long tons (560 t) light and 625 long tons (635 t) full load. Ouse was powered by two Vertical Triple-Expansion steam engines, rated at 7,000 ihp (5,200 kW) to meet the contract speed of 25.5 kn (29.3 mph; 47.2 km/h). Two funnels were fitted. The ship had a crew of 70 officers and other ranks. As built, Ouse's armament was the same as the turtleback destroyers that preceded the Rivers, i.e. a gun armament of a single 12-pounder gun and five 6-pounder guns, and two 18-in torpedo tubes. Unlike some of the early River-class destroyers, Ouse's forward two six-pounders were mounted on the forecastle along with the 12-pounder, rather than on sponsons projecting over the ship's sides, which kept them out of spray and made them easier to operate. In 1906, as a result of Japanese experience during the Russo-Japanese War, the Admiralty decided to upgrade the armament of the Rivers by replacing the five 6-pounder naval guns with three lightweight 12-pounder 8 hundredweight (cwt) guns. Two would be mounted abeam at the forecastle break and the third gun would be mounted on the quarterdeck. The class was refitted with the new armament during 1908.

Ouse was laid down on 22 March 1904 at the Cammell Laird shipyard at Birkenhead and launched on 7 January 1905. The ship reached a speed of 25.56 kn (29.41 mph; 47.34 km/h) over a four-hour run during official sea trials, and was completed in September 1905.

== Pre-War ==
On 18 September 1905, Ouse was commissioned at Devonport with a nucleus crew into the Devonport Reserve Flotilla. After commissioning she was assigned to the East Coast Destroyer Flotilla of the 1st Fleet and based at Harwich.

On 27 April 1908 the Eastern Flotilla departed Harwich for live fire and night manoeuvres. During these exercises HMS Attentive rammed and sank HMS Gala then damaged HMS Ribble.

In December 1910, Ouse, formerly a member of the 2nd Destroyer Flotilla, recommissioned with a nucleus crew at Chatham as a member of the 3rd Destroyer Flotilla based at the Nore. She remained until displaced by a Basilisk-class destroyer by May 1912. She went into reserve assigned to the 5th Destroyer Flotilla of the 2nd Fleet with a nucleus crew.

On 30 August 1912 the Admiralty directed all destroyers were to be allocated to classes designated by letters starting with the letter 'A'. The ships of the River Class were assigned to the E Class. In 1912, older destroyers were transferred to patrol flotillas, with Ouse forming part of the 9th Destroyer Flotilla, based on the Nore, and tendered to the depot ship St George by March 1913. The 9th Flotilla was allocated the war station of the Firth of Forth.

== World War I ==
On 30 July 1914, as part of the Royal Navy's mobilisation on the eve of the outbreak of the First World War, the 9th Flotilla, including Ouse, left Harwich for the River Tyne, with the flotilla being responsible for patrols between Berwick-upon-Tweed and midway between Scarborough and Spurn Point. Duties of the flotilla were to prevent enemy ships from carrying out minelaying or torpedo attacks in the approaches to ports on the East coast, and to prevent raids by enemy ships.

In August 1915 with the amalgamation of the 9th and 7th Flotillas she was deployed to the 7th Destroyer Flotilla based on the River Humber. She remained employed on the Humber Patrol participating in counter-mining operations and anti-submarine patrols for the remainder of the war.

On 3 May 1917, Ouse and the destroyer Bat opened fire on the British submarine C10 off Blyth, Northumberland. Although one man was killed and a second was wounded, the submarine survived.

On 28 August 1918 she depth charged the German submarine UC-70, which had been spotted and damaged by a Blackburn Kangaroo patrol aircraft of No. 246 Squadron RAF near Runswick Bay off the Yorkshire coast. UC-70 sank at position 54°32'N, 00°40'W with the loss of 31 officers and men.

On 29 September 1918, Ouse in conjunction with the destroyer Star depth charged the German submarine UB-115 to destruction off Sunderland. UB-115 sank at position 55°13'N 01°22'E with the loss of 39 officers and men.

== Fate ==
In 1919 Ouse was paid off then laid up in reserve awaiting disposal. On 22 October 1919 she was sold to J.H. Lee for breaking at Dover.

== Pennant numbers ==
Pennant number	From	To
N69	6 Dec 1914	1 Sep 1915
D28	1 Sep 1915	1 Jan 1918
D66	1 Jan 1918	13 Sep 1918
H80	13 Sep 1918	22 Oct 1919

== Bibliography ==
- Chesneau, Roger & Kolesnik, Eugene M., eds. (1979). Conway's All The World's Fighting Ships 1860–1905. London: Conway Maritime Press. ISBN 0-85177-133-5.
- Colledge, J. J.; Warlow, Ben (2006) [1969]. Ships of the Royal Navy: The Complete Record of All Fighting Ships of the Royal Navy from the 15th Century to the Present (3rd Rev ed.). London: Chatham Publishing. ISBN 978-1-86176-281-8. OCLC 67375475.
- Corbett, Julian S. (1920). History of the Great War: Naval Operations: Vol. I: To the Battle of the Falklands December 1914. London: Longmans, Green and Co.
- Dittmar, F.J.; Colledge, J. J. (1972). British Warships 1914–1919. Shepperton, UK: Ian Allan. ISBN 0-7110-0380-7.
- Friedman, Norman (2009). British Destroyers: From Earliest Days to the Second World War. Barnsley, UK: Seaforth Publishing. ISBN 978-1-84832-049-9.
- Gardiner, Robert & Gray, Randal, eds. (1985). Conway's All The World's Fighting Ships 1906–1921. London: Conway Maritime Press. ISBN 0-85177-245-5.
- Jackson, A. J. (August 1979). "Blackburn's Marsupial". Aeroplane Monthly. Vol. 7, no. 8. London: IPC. pp. 396–402.
- Leyland, John; Brassey, T. A., eds. (1906). The Naval Annual, 1906. Portsmouth: J. Griffin and Co.
- Manning, T. D. (1961). The British Destroyer. London: Putnam & Co. OCLC 6470051.
- March, Edgar J. (1966). British Destroyers: A History of Development, 1892–1953; Drawn by Admiralty Permission From Official Records & Returns, Ships' Covers & Building Plans. London: Seeley Service. OCLC 164893555.
- Monograph No. 7: The Patrol Flotillas at the Commencement of the War (PDF). Naval Staff Monographs (Historical). Vol. III. The Naval Staff, Training and Staff Duties Division. 1921. pp. 71–107.
- Monograph No. 35: Home Waters—Part IX: 1st May 1917 to 31st July 1917 (PDF). Naval Staff Monographs (Historical). Vol. XIX. The Naval Staff, Training and Staff Duties Division. 1939.
