= HMS Patrol =

Pathfinder-class cruiser

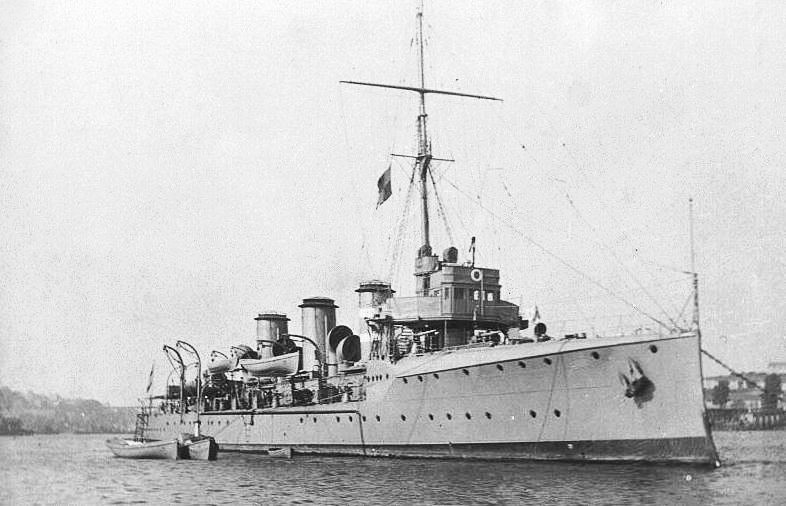
- Patrol with her original 12-pounder guns

History

United Kingdom
- Name: Patrol
- Builder: Cammell Laird, Birkenhead
- Laid down: October 1903
- Launched: 13 October 1904
- Commissioned: September 1905
- Decommissioned: 1919
- Fate: Sold for scrap, 21 April 1920

General characteristics (as built)
- Class & type: Pathfinder-class scout cruiser
- Displacement: 2,940 long tons (2,987 t)
- Length: 370 ft (112.8 m) (p/p)
- Beam: 38 ft 9 in (11.8 m)
- Draught: 15 ft 2 in (4.6 m) (deep load)
- Installed power: 16,500 ihp (12,300 kW); 12 Laird-Normand boilers
- Propulsion: 2 Shafts, 2 triple-expansion steam engines
- Speed: 25 knots (46 km/h; 29 mph)
- Range: 3,400 nmi (6,300 km; 3,900 mi) at 10 knots (19 km/h; 12 mph)
- Complement: 289
- Armament: 10 × QF 12-pdr 3 in (76 mm) guns; 8 × QF 3-pdr (47 mm) guns; 2 × 18 in (450 mm) torpedo tubes
- Armour: Waterline belt: 2 in (51 mm); Deck: 0.75–1.125 in (19.1–28.6 mm); Conning tower: 3 in (76 mm)

HMS Patrol was one of two Pathfinder-class scout cruisers built for the Royal Navy in the first decade of the 20th century. The ship was in reserve for most of the first decade of her existence. After the beginning of the First World War in August 1914, she was assigned to coastal defence duties on the East Coast of England. Patrol was badly damaged during the German bombardment of Hartlepool in mid-December 1914 when she attempted to exit the harbour during the bombardment. After repairs were completed she remained on coast defence duties until she was transferred to the Irish Sea in 1918. The ship was paid off in 1919 and sold for scrap in 1920.

== Design and description ==
The Pathfinder-class ships were one of four classes of scout cruisers ordered by the Admiralty in 1902–1903 and 1903–1904 Naval Programmes. These ships were intended to work with destroyer flotillas, leading their torpedo attacks and backing them up when attacked by other destroyers, although they quickly became less useful as destroyer speeds increased before the First World War. They had a length between perpendiculars of 370 feet (112.8 m), a beam of 38 feet 9 inches (11.8 m) and a draught of 15 feet 2 inches (4.6 m) at deep load. The ships displaced 2,940 long tons (2,987 t) at normal load and 3,240 long tons (3,292 t) at deep load. Their crew consisted of 289 officers and ratings.

The ships were powered by a pair of three-cylinder triple-expansion steam engines, each driving one shaft, using steam provided by a dozen Laird-Normand boilers. The engines were designed to produce a total of 16,500 indicated horsepower (12,300 kW) which was intended to give a maximum speed of 25 knots (46 km/h; 29 mph). The Pathfinder-class cruisers carried enough coal to give them a range of 3,400 nautical miles (6,300 km; 3,900 mi) at 10 knots (19 km/h; 12 mph).

The main armament of the Pathfinder class consisted of ten quick-firing (QF) 12-pounder 3 in (76 mm) 18-cwt guns. (Note: "Cwt" is the abbreviation for hundredweight, 18 cwt referring to the weight of the gun.) Three guns were mounted abreast on the forecastle and the quarterdeck, with the remaining four guns positioned port and starboard amidships. They also carried eight 3-pounder Hotchkiss guns and two above-water 18-inch (450 mm) torpedo tubes, one on each broadside. The ships' protective deck armour ranged in thickness from 0.75 to 1.125 inches (19 to 29 mm) and the conning tower had armour 3 inches (76 mm) inches thick. They had a waterline belt 2 inches (51 mm) thick abreast engine rooms only.

== Construction and career ==
Patrol was laid down on 31 October 1903 by Cammell Laird's Birkenhead shipyard. She was launched on 13 October 1904 and completed on 26 September 1905. Not long after completion, two additional 12-pounder guns were added and the 3-pounder guns were replaced with six QF 6-pounder Hotchkiss guns. The ship was in initially in reserve until she was assigned to the Home Fleet in October 1907 and then the 3rd Fleet at the Nore Command in 1908. In 1909 she served a short spell as leader of the 1st Destroyer Flotilla (DF) at Portsmouth, then moved to the 3rd Destroyer Flotilla and was fitted at HM Dockyard, Chatham, in June before rejoining the 1st later in the year. Patrol was back in reserve in 1912. About 1911–1912, her main guns were replaced by nine 4-inch (102 mm) guns, arranged four on each broadside and the remaining gun on the quarterdeck. She was stationed at Haulbowline in 1913–14. The ship recommissioned on 27 January 1914 to serve as the leader of the 9th Destroyer Flotilla.

At the beginning of the First World War in August, the 9th DF was protecting the north east coastline between the Firth of Forth and the Tyne. On 15 December, under the command of Captain Alan C. Bruce, she was berthed in Hartlepool with HMS Forward, another scout cruiser, four destroyers from the 9th Flotilla (HMS Doon, HMS Waveney, HMS Moy and HMS Test) and the submarine HMS C9. Hartlepool was a tidal harbour, and at low tide it was difficult for the cruisers to get out to sea. On 16 December, the destroyers put out to sea at 05:30 and had reported that the tide was very low and the swell outside the harbour was very high. Brown decided that it was too dangerous for the cruisers and C9 to go out on patrol.

At 08:00 the flotilla sighted the German battlecruisers Seydlitz and Moltke and the armoured cruiser Blücher, preparing to bombard Hartlepool. The heavy German ships chased off the hopelessly outgunned destroyers and opened fire on Hartlepool's two coastal artillery batteries, which mounted three 6-inch (152 mm) guns, before bombarding the port and harbour entrance. Bruce attempted to leave the harbour, but was engaged by Blücher in the channel to the open sea and hit by two 210-millimetre (8.3 in) shells. Four men were killed and seven wounded, and Bruce had to beach his ship. The German ships broke off the raid before finishing off the cruiser. Badly holed, Patrol had taken on too much water to return to Hartlepool, but was able to reach the Middlesbrough docks.

After undergoing extensive repairs she joined the 7th Destroyer Flotilla in the Humber in 1915. She was transferred to the Irish Sea in 1918 and then back to the 9th DF at the Nore. Surplus to requirements after the end of the war, she was paid off in April 1919 and sold for scrap in April 1920 to Machinehandel, of the Netherlands.

== Bibliography ==
- Corbett, Julian S. (n.d.) [1929]. Naval Operations. History of the Great War Based on Official Documents by Direction of the Historical Section of the Committee of Imperial Defence. Vol. II (2nd, Imperial War Museum and Battery Press reprint ed.). London: Longmans, Green & Co. ISBN 1-870423-74-7.
- Friedman, Norman (2009). British Destroyers From Earliest Days to the Second World War. Annapolis, Maryland: Naval Institute Press. ISBN 978-1-59114-081-8.
- Friedman, Norman (2011). Naval Weapons of World War One. Barnsley, South Yorkshire, UK: Seaforth. ISBN 978-1-84832-100-7.
- Massie, Robert K. (2003). Castles of Steel: Britain, Germany, and the Winning of the Great War at Sea. New York: Random House. ISBN 0-679-45671-6.
- McBride, K. D. (1994). "The Royal Navy 'Scout' Class of 1904–05". Warship International. XXXI (3): 260–281. ISSN 0043-0374.
- Morris, Douglas (1987). Cruisers of the Royal and Commonwealth Navies Since 1879. Liskeard, UK: Maritime Books. ISBN 0-907771-35-1.
- Preston, Antony (1985). "Great Britain and Empire Forces". In Gardiner, Robert & Gray, Randal (eds.). Conway's All the World's Fighting Ships 1906–1921. Annapolis, Maryland: Naval Institute Press. pp. 1–104. ISBN 0-85177-245-5.
- Roberts, John (1979). "Great Britain (Including Empire Forces)". In Chesneau, Roger & Kolesnik, Eugene M. (eds.). Conway's All the World's Fighting Ships 1860–1905. Greenwich: Conway Maritime Press. pp. 1–114. ISBN 0-8317-0302-4.
