= HMS Rother (1904) =

Destroyer of the Royal Navy

History

United Kingdom
- Name: Rother
- Ordered: 1902–1903 Naval Estimates
- Builder: Palmers Shipbuilding and Iron Company, Jarrow
- Laid down: 23 March 1903
- Launched: 5 January 1904
- Commissioned: May 1905
- Out of service: In 1919 she was laid up in reserve awaiting disposal
- Fate: 23 July 1919 sold to Thos. W. Ward of Sheffield for breaking at Briton Ferry, Glamorgan in Wales

General characteristics
- Class & type: Palmer Type River Class destroyer
- Displacement: 550 long tons (559 t) standard; 620 long tons (630 t) full load; 223 ft 6 in (68.12 m) o/a; 23 ft 6 in (7.16 m) Beam; 7 ft 4.5 in (2.248 m) Draught
- Propulsion: 4 × Reed water tube boilers; 2 × Vertical Triple Expansion (VTE) steam engines driving 2 shafts producing 7,000 shp (5,200 kW) (average)
- Speed: 25.5 kn (47.2 km/h)
- Range: 140 tons coal; 1,620 nmi (3,000 km) at 11 kn (20 km/h)
- Complement: 70 officers and men
- Armament: 1 × QF 12-pounder 12 cwt Mark I, mounting P Mark I; 3 × QF 12-pounder 8 cwt, mounting G Mark I (Added in 1906); 5 × QF 6-pounder 8 cwt (removed in 1906); 2 × single tubes for 18-inch (450mm) torpedoes

Service record
- Part of: East Coast Destroyer Flotilla - 1905; 3rd Destroyer Flotilla - Apr 1909; 5th Destroyer Flotilla - 1912; Assigned E Class - Aug 1912 - Oct 1913; 9th Destroyer Flotilla - 1914; 1st Destroyer Flotilla - Nov 1916
- Operations: World War I

HMS Rother was a Palmer type River-class destroyer ordered by the Royal Navy under the 1902–1903 Naval Estimates. Named after the River Rother, east of Sheffield, South Yorkshire in England, she was the first ship to carry this name in the Royal Navy.

== Construction ==
She was laid down on 23 March 1903 at the Palmer's shipyard at Jarrow and launched on 5 January 1904. She was completed in May 1905. Her original armament was to be the same as the turtleback torpedo boat destroyers that preceded her. In 1906 the Admiralty decided to upgrade the armament by landing the five 6-pounder naval guns and shipping three 12-pounder 8 hundredweight (cwt) guns. Two would be mounted abeam at the forecastle break and the third gun would be mounted on the quarterdeck.

== Pre-War ==
After commissioning she was assigned to the East Coast Destroyer Flotilla of the 1st Fleet and based at Harwich. On 27 April 1908 the Eastern Flotilla departed Harwich for live fire and night manoeuvres. During these exercises the cruiser Attentive rammed and sank the destroyer Gala then damaged the destroyer Ribble.

In January 1909 Rother completed a refit at Sheerness before rejoining the Eastern Flotilla at Harwich. In April 1909 she was assigned to the 3rd Destroyer Flotilla on its formation at Harwich. On 2 November 1909 the destroyer Crusader collided with Rother near the Longsand lightvessel. Rother was repaired at Harwich by the depot ship Blenheim. She remained part of the Flotilla until displaced by a Basilisk Class destroyer by May 1912.

Rother had her boilers retubed at Pembroke Dockyard in 1912, joining the 5th Destroyer Flotilla on completion of the refit. She was assigned to the 5th Destroyer Flotilla of the 2nd Fleet with a nucleus crew. On 30 August 1912 the Admiralty directed all destroyers were to be grouped into classes designated by letters, with the River-class becoming known officially as the E-Class. The class letters were painted on the hull below the bridge area and on one of the funnels.

A reorganisation of the Royal Navy's destroyer force took place in 1912, with older destroyers, no longer suitable for fleet use, being used to equip Patrol Flotillas. By March 1913, Rother was part of the 9th Destroyer Flotilla, a patrol flotilla based on the Nore.

== World War I ==
The role of the patrol flotillas was to prevent enemy ships from carrying out minelaying or torpedo attacks in the approaches to ports on the East coast, and to prevent raids by enemy ships. Shortly before the commencement of hostilities, the 9th Flotilla was deployed to its war station in the northern part of the East coast of England. While still a member of the 9th Flotilla in March 1915, by June that year she had transferred to the Local Defence Flotilla based at Portsmouth. In June 1916, Rother was part of a Portsmouth-based Escort Flotilla.

Rother remained part of the Portsmouth-based Escort Flotilla until August 1917, but was listed as part of the 7th Destroyer Flotilla, employed on convoy escort duties on the East coast of England, in September 1917. She remained employed on convoy duties of the East coast of Britain, and on 10 December 1917 left Lerwick in Shetland with sister ship Moy as escort of a convoy of ships for East coast ports. Rother remained part of the 7th Flotilla in January 1918, but by February that year had transferred to the Portsmouth-based 1st Destroyer Flotilla. She remained part of the 1st Flotilla at the end of the war.

== Disposition ==
By May 1919 she was paid off and listed for sale. On 23 June 1919 she was sold to Thos. W. Ward of Sheffield for breaking at Briton Ferry, Glamorgan in Wales. She was not awarded a Battle Honour for her service.

== Pennant Numbers ==
Pennant Number	From	To
N32	6 Dec 1914	1 Sep 1915
D29	1 Sep 1915	1 Jan 1918
D73	1 Jan 1918	23 Jun 1919

== Bibliography ==
- Chesneau, Roger & Kolesnik, Eugene M., eds. (1979). Conway's All The World's Fighting Ships 1860–1905. London: Conway Maritime Press. ISBN 0-85177-133-5.
- Colledge, J. J.; Warlow, Ben (2006) [1969]. Ships of the Royal Navy: The Complete Record of All Fighting Ships of the Royal Navy from the 15th Century to the Present (3rd Rev ed.). London: Chatham Publishing. ISBN 978-1-86176-281-8. OCLC 67375475.
- Dittmar, F.J.; Colledge, J. J. (1972). British Warships 1914–1919. Shepperton, UK: Ian Allan. ISBN 0-7110-0380-7.
- Friedman, Norman (2009). British Destroyers: From Earliest Days to the Second World War. Barnsley, UK: Seaforth Publishing. ISBN 978-1-84832-049-9.
- Gardiner, Robert & Gray, Randall, eds. (1985). Conway's All The World's Fighting Ships 1906–1921. London: Conway Maritime Press. ISBN 0-85177-245-5.
- Jane, Fred T. (1969) [First published by Sampson Low Marston: London 1905]. Jane's Fighting Ships 1905/6. New York: ARCO Publishing Company.
- Manning, T. D. (1961). The British Destroyer. London: Putnam & Co. OCLC 6470051.
- March, Edgar J. (1966). British Destroyers: A History of Development, 1892–1953; Drawn by Admiralty Permission From Official Records & Returns, Ships' Covers & Building Plans. London: Seeley Service. OCLC 164893555.
- Monograph No. 7: The Patrol Flotillas at the Commencement of the War (PDF). Naval Staff Monographs (Historical). Vol. III. The Naval Staff, Training and Staff Duties Division. 1921. pp. 71–107.
- Moore, John E. (1990). Jane's Fighting Ships of World War I. Studio Editions. p. 76. ISBN 1 85170 378 0.
- Newbolt, Henry (1931). Naval Operations Vol. V. History of the Great War. London: Longmans, Green & Co.
