= HMS Doon (1904) =

Destroyer of the Royal Navy

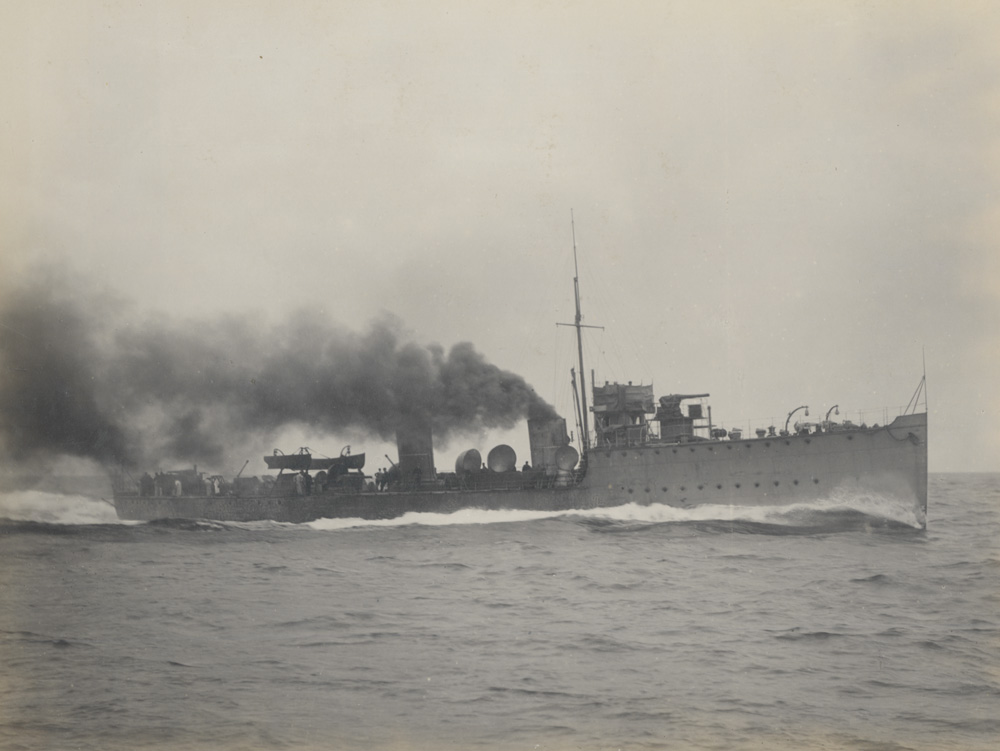
- HMS Doon in 1905

History

United Kingdom
- Name: Doon
- Ordered: 1903 – 1904 Naval Estimates
- Builder: R.W. Hawthorn Leslie and Company, Ltd, Newcastle-upon-Tyne
- Laid down: 16 February 1904
- Launched: 8 November 1904
- Commissioned: 1 June 1905
- Out of service: 1919 laid up in reserve awaiting disposal
- Fate: 27 May 1919 sold to Thos. W. Ward of Sheffield for breaking at Rainham, Kent, on the Thames Estuary

General characteristics
- Class & type: Hawthorn Leslie Type River-class destroyer
- Displacement: 550 long tons (559 t) standard; 625 long tons (635 t) full load; 226 ft 6 in (69.04 m) o/a; 23 ft 9 in (7.24 m) Beam; 7 ft 9 in (2.36 m) Draught
- Propulsion: 4 × Yarrow type water tube boiler; 2 × Vertical Triple Expansion (VTE) steam engines driving 2 shafts producing 7,000 shp (5,200 kW) (average)
- Speed: 25.5 kn (47.2 km/h)
- Range: 140 tons coal; 1,870 nmi (3,460 km) at 11 kn (20 km/h)
- Complement: 70 officers and men
- Armament: 1 × QF 12-pounder 12 cwt Mark I, mounting P Mark I; 3 × QF 12-pounder 8 cwt, mounting G Mark I (Added in 1906); 5 × QF 6-pounder 8 cwt (removed in 1906); 2 × single tubes for 18-inch (450mm) torpedoes

Service record
- Part of: East Coast Destroyer Flotilla - 1905; 3rd Destroyer Flotilla - Apr 1909; 5th Destroyer Flotilla - 1912; Assigned E Class - Aug 1912 - Oct 1913; 9th Destroyer Flotilla - 1914; 7th Destroyer Flotilla - Aug 1915
- Operations: World War I 1914 - 1918

HMS Doon was a Hawthorn Leslie type River-class destroyer ordered by the Royal Navy under the 1903 – 1904 Naval Estimates. Named after the River Doon in western Scotland, she was the first ship to carry this name in the Royal Navy.

== Construction ==
She was laid down on 16 February 1904 at the Hawthorn Leslie shipyard at Hebburn-on-Tyne and launched on 8 November 1904. She was completed in June 1905. Her original armament was to be the same as the Turtleback torpedo boat destroyers that preceded her. In 1906 the Admiralty decided to upgrade the armament by landing the five 6-pounder naval guns and shipping three 12-pounder 8 hundredweight (cwt) guns. Two would be mounted abeam at the foc's'le break and the third gun would be mounted on the quarterdeck.

== Prewar ==
After commissioning she was assigned to the East Coast Destroyer Flotilla of the 1st Fleet and based at Harwich.

On 27 April 1908 the Eastern Flotilla departed Harwich for live fire and night manoeuvres. During these exercises HMS Attentive rammed and sank HMS Gala then damaged HMS Ribble.

In July 1908 Doon entered refit and had a new propeller shaft fitted at Sheerness Dockyard, returning to the Channel Fleet destroyer Flotilla at the end of September. On the night of 2/3 March 1909, Doon, which had set off from Portland Harbour with the destroyer Fawn to escort the Royal yacht Alexandra from Dover to Calais, collided with the steam trawler Halcyon. The trawler sank, with all of her crew rescued by Doon, while Doon's bow was badly damaged, forcing her to put into Portsmouth for repair. In April 1909 she was assigned to the 3rd Destroyer Flotilla on its formation at Harwich. She remained until displaced by a Basilisk-class destroyer by May 1912. She was assigned to the 5th Destroyer Flotilla of the 2nd Fleet with a nucleus crew.

On 30 August 1912 the Admiralty directed all destroyer classes were to be designated by alpha characters starting with the letter 'A'. The ships of the River class were assigned to the E class. After 30 September 1913, she was known as an E-class destroyer and had the letter ‘E’ painted on the hull below the bridge area and on either the fore or aft funnel.

== World War I ==
In early 1914 when displaced by G-class destroyers she joined the 9th Destroyer Flotilla based at Chatham tendered to HMS St George. The 9th Flotilla was a Patrol Flotilla tasked with anti-submarine and counter mining patrols in the Firth of Forth area.

On 16 December 1914 under command of Lieutenant-Commander H. McLeod-Fraser, RN, as the division leader with HMS Waveney, HMS Test and HMS Moy were sent to patrol off Hartlepool. During the German Raid on Hartlepool, she was damaged by German shellfire. She was straddled by three salvoes with one near miss by an 11-inch (280 mm) shell grazing the after edge of the foremost funnel, damaging a Berthon collapsible lifeboat, before going overboard and bursting on impact with the water. She suffered splinter damage and had her wireless, aft gun and torpedo tube put out of action. She suffered three dead and six wounded.

In August 1915 with the amalgamation of the 9th and 7th Flotillas she was deployed to the 7th Destroyer Flotilla based at the River Humber. She remained employed on the Humber Patrol, participating in counter mining operations and anti-submarine patrols for the remainder of the war.

== Disposition ==
In 1919 she was paid off and laid up in reserve awaiting disposal. On 27 May 1919 she was sold to Thos. W. Ward of Sheffield for breaking at Rainham, Kent, on the Thames Estuary.

She was not awarded a Battle Honour for her service

== Pennant numbers ==
Pennant Number	From	To
N14	6 Dec 1914	1 Sep 1915
D16	1 Sep 1915	1 Jan 1918
D27	1 Jan 1918	27 May 1919

== Bibliography ==
- Chesneau, Roger & Kolesnik, Eugene M., eds. (1979). Conway's All The World's Fighting Ships 1860–1905. London: Conway Maritime Press. ISBN 0-85177-133-5.
- Colledge, J. J.; Warlow, Ben (2006) [1969]. Ships of the Royal Navy: The Complete Record of All Fighting Ships of the Royal Navy from the 15th Century to the Present (3rd Rev ed.). London: Chatham Publishing. ISBN 978-1-86176-281-8. OCLC 67375475.
- Dittmar, F.J.; Colledge, J. J. (1972). British Warships 1914–1919. Shepperton, UK: Ian Allan. ISBN 0-7110-0380-7.
- Friedman, Norman (2009). British Destroyers: From Earliest Days to the Second World War. Barnsley, UK: Seaforth Publishing. ISBN 978-1-84832-049-9.
- Gardiner, Robert & Gray, Randal, eds. (1985). Conway's All The World's Fighting Ships 1906–1921. London: Conway Maritime Press. ISBN 0-85177-245-5.
- Manning, T. D. (1961). The British Destroyer. London: Putnam & Co. OCLC 6470051.
- March, Edgar J. (1966). British Destroyers: A History of Development, 1892–1953; Drawn by Admiralty Permission From Official Records & Returns, Ships' Covers & Building Plans. London: Seeley Service. OCLC 164893555.
