= HMS Waveney (1903) =

Destroyer of the Royal Navy

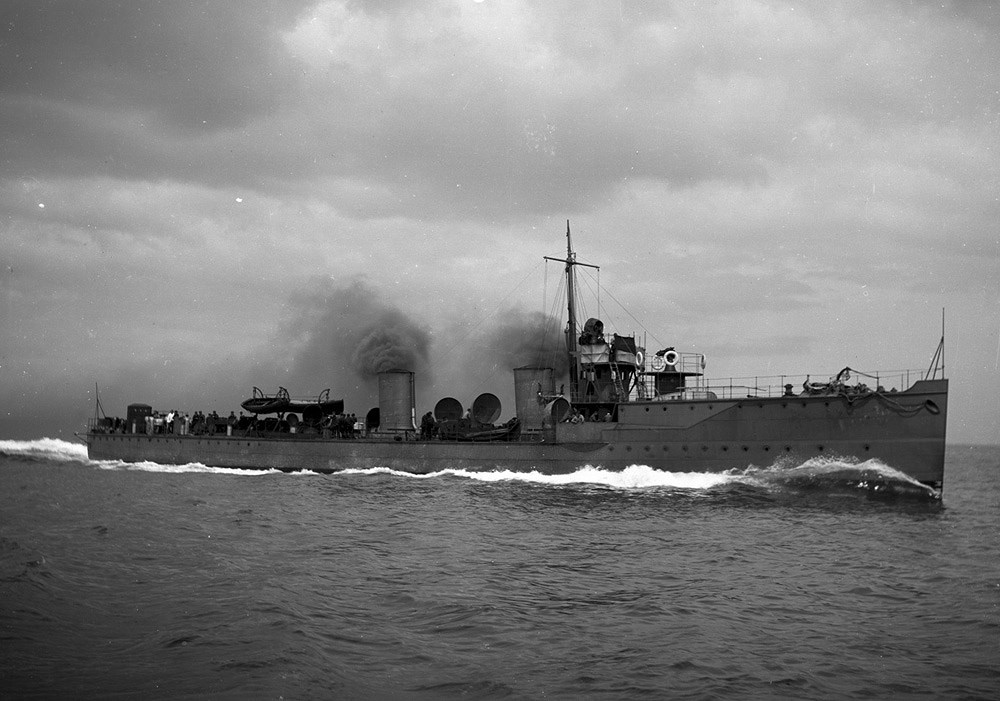
- HMS Waveney at sea

History

United Kingdom
- Name: Waveney
- Ordered: 1902–1903 Naval Estimates
- Builder: R.W. Hawthorn Leslie and Company, Ltd, Newcastle-upon-Tyne
- Laid down: 20 October 1902
- Launched: 16 March 1903
- Commissioned: 1 June 1904
- Out of service: 1919 laid up in reserve awaiting disposal
- Fate: Sold for breaking, 20 February 1920

General characteristics
- Class & type: Hawthorn Leslie-type River-class destroyer
- Displacement: 550 long tons (559 t) standard; 625 long tons (635 t) full load
- Length: 226 ft 6 in (69.04 m) o/a
- Beam: 23 ft 9 in (7.24 m)
- Draught: 7 ft 9 in (2.36 m)
- Installed power: 7,000 shp (5,200 kW)
- Propulsion: 4 × Yarrow type water tube boilers; 2 × vertical triple-expansion steam engines; 2 shafts
- Speed: 25.5 kn (47.2 km/h)
- Range: 140 tons coal; 1,870 nmi (3,460 km) at 11 kn (20 km/h)
- Complement: 70 officers and men
- Armament: 1 × QF 12-pounder 12 cwt Mark I, mounting P Mark I; 3 × QF 12-pounder 8 cwt, mounting G Mark I (Added in 1906); 5 × QF 6-pounder 8 cwt (removed in 1906); 2 × single tubes for 18-inch (450mm) torpedoes

Service record
- Part of: East Coast Destroyer Flotilla – 1904; 3rd Destroyer Flotilla – Apr 1909; 5th Destroyer Flotilla – 1912; Assigned E Class – Aug 1912 – Oct 1913; 9th Destroyer Flotilla – 1914; 7th Destroyer Flotilla – Aug 1915
- Operations: World War I 1914–1918

HMS Waveney was a Hawthorn Leslie-type River-class destroyer ordered by the Royal Navy under the 1902–1903 Naval Estimates. Named after the River Waveney in eastern England, she was the first ship of the Royal Navy to carry this name.

== Construction ==
Waveney was laid down on 20 October 1902 at the Hawthorn Leslie shipyard at Hebburn-on-Tyne and launched on 16 March 1903. She was completed in June 1904. The original armament provided was to be the same as the turtleback torpedo boat destroyers that preceded her. In 1906 the Admiralty decided to upgrade the armament by landing the five 6-pounder naval guns and shipping three 12-pounder 8 hundredweight (cwt) guns. Two were mounted abeam at the foc's'le break, and the third gun was mounted on the quarterdeck.

== Service history ==
=== Pre-War ===
After commissioning Waveney was assigned to the East Coast Destroyer Flotilla of the 1st Fleet and based at Harwich.

In 1906 Waveney was part of the First Destroyer Division. On 26 July 1907 Waveney and the destroyer Garry collided off Sandown, damaging both ships.

On 27 April 1908 the Eastern Flotilla departed Harwich for live fire and night manoeuvres. During these exercises the cruiser Attentive rammed and sank the destroyer Gala and damaged the destroyer Ribble.

In April 1909 she was assigned to the 3rd Destroyer Flotilla on its formation at Harwich. She remained until displaced by a Beagle-class destroyer by May 1912. She was assigned to the 5th Destroyer Flotilla of the 2nd Fleet with a nucleus crew.

On 30 August 1912 the Admiralty directed all destroyer classes were to be designated by alpha characters starting with the letter 'A'. The ships of the River class were assigned to the E class. After 30 September 1913, she was known as an E-class destroyer and had the letter ‘E’ painted on the hull below the bridge area and on either the fore or aft funnel.

=== World War I ===
In early 1914 when replaced by G-class destroyers, Waveney joined the 9th Destroyer Flotilla based at Chatham tendered to HMS St George. The 9th Flotilla was a patrol flotilla tasked with anti-submarine and counter-mining patrols in the Firth of Forth area.

On 16 December 1914 in company with the division leader Doon, Waveney, Test and Moy were sent to patrol off Hartlepool. During the German battlecruiser raid on Hartlepool, she was undamaged and suffered no casualties.

In August 1915 with the amalgamation of the 9th and 7th Flotillas she was deployed to the 7th Destroyer Flotilla based at the River Humber. Waveney remained employed on the Humber Patrol participating in counter mining operations and anti-submarine patrols for the remainder of the war.

== Disposition ==
In 1919 Waveney was paid off and laid up in reserve awaiting disposal. On 20 February 1920 the ship was sold to Thos. W. Ward of Sheffield for breaking at Grays, Essex on the Thames Estuary.

== Pennant numbers ==
Pennant number	From	To
N19	6 Dec 1914	1 Sep 1915
D35	1 Sep 1915	1 Jan 1918
D96	1 Jan 1918	13 Sep 1918
H86	13 Sep 1918	20 Feb 1919

== Bibliography ==
- Chesneau, Roger & Kolesnik, Eugene M., eds. (1979). Conway's All The World's Fighting Ships 1860–1905. London: Conway Maritime Press. ISBN 0-85177-133-5.
- Colledge, J. J.; Warlow, Ben (2006) [1969]. Ships of the Royal Navy: The Complete Record of All Fighting Ships of the Royal Navy from the 15th Century to the Present (3rd Rev ed.). London: Chatham Publishing. ISBN 978-1-86176-281-8. OCLC 67375475.
- Dittmar, F.J.; Colledge, J. J. (1972). British Warships 1914–1919. Shepperton, UK: Ian Allan. ISBN 0-7110-0380-7.
- Friedman, Norman (2009). British Destroyers: From Earliest Days to the Second World War. Barnsley, UK: Seaforth Publishing. ISBN 978-1-84832-049-9.
- Gardiner, Robert & Gray, Randal, eds. (1985). Conway's All The World's Fighting Ships 1906–1921. London: Conway Maritime Press. ISBN 0-85177-245-5.
- Manning, T. D. (1961). The British Destroyer. London: Putnam & Co. OCLC 6470051.
- March, Edgar J. (1966). British Destroyers: A History of Development, 1892–1953; Drawn by Admiralty Permission From Official Records & Returns, Ships' Covers & Building Plans. London: Seeley Service. OCLC 164893555.
