= HMS Moy =

Laird Type River-class destroyer of the Royal Navy

History

United Kingdom
- Name: Moy
- Ordered: 1903–1904 Naval Estimates
- Builder: Cammell Laird, Birkenhead
- Laid down: 22 March 1904
- Launched: 10 November 1904
- Commissioned: June 1905
- Out of service: Laid up in reserve 1919
- Fate: Sold for scrapping to T. Oakley on 27 May 1919

General characteristics
- Class & type: Laird Type River Class destroyer
- Displacement: 550 long tons (559 t) standard; 625 long tons (635 t) full load; 226 ft 6 in (69.04 m) o/a; 23 ft 9 in (7.24 m) Beam; 7 ft 9 in (2.36 m) Draught
- Propulsion: 4 × Yarrow type water tube boiler; 2 × Vertical Triple Expansion (VTE) steam engines driving 2 shafts producing 7,000 shp (5,200 kW) (average)
- Speed: 25.5 kn (47.2 km/h)
- Range: 140 tons coal; 1,870 nmi (3,460 km) at 11 kn (20 km/h)
- Complement: 70 officers and men
- Armament: 1 × QF 12-pounder 12 cwt Mark I, mounting P Mark I; 3 × QF 12-pounder 8 cwt, mounting G Mark I (Added in 1906); 5 × QF 6-pounder 8 cwt (removed in 1906); 2 × single tubes for 18-inch (450mm) torpedoes

Service record
- Part of: East Coast Destroyer Flotilla, 1905; 3rd Destroyer Flotilla, April 1909; 5th Destroyer Flotilla, 1912; Assigned E Class - August 1912 – October 1913; 9th Destroyer Flotilla, 1914; 7th Destroyer Flotilla, August 1915
- Operations: World War I 1914–1918

HMS Moy was a Laird Type River-class destroyer of the Royal Navy. Named after the River Moy in Ireland, she was the first ship to carry this name in the Royal Navy.

== Construction ==
She was ordered under the 1903 – 1904 Naval Estimates, laid down on 22 March 1904, at Cammell Laird's shipyard at Birkenhead and launched on 10 November 1904. She was completed in June 1905. Her original armament was to be the same as the turtleback torpedo boat destroyers that preceded her. In 1906 the Admiralty decided to upgrade the armament by landing the five 6-pounder naval guns and shipping three 12-pounder/8 hundredweight (cwt) guns). Two would be mounted abeam at the foc's'le break and the third gun would be mounted on the quarterdeck.

== Pre-War ==
After commissioning she was assigned to the East Coast Destroyer Flotilla of the 1st Fleet and based at Harwich. On 27 April 1908, the Eastern Flotilla departed Harwich for live fire and night manoeuvres. During these exercises HMS Attentive rammed and sank HMS Gala then damaged HMS Ribble. In April 1909 she was assigned to the 3rd Destroyer Flotilla on its formation at Harwich. She remained until displaced by a Beagle-class destroyer by May 1912. She went into reserve assigned to the 5th Destroyer Flotilla of the Second Fleet with a nucleus crew. On 30 August 1912 the Admiralty directed all destroyer classes were to be designated by alpha characters starting with the letter 'A'. The ships of the River class were assigned to the E class. After 30 September 1913, she was known as an E class destroyer and had the letter ‘E’ painted on the hull below the bridge area and on either the fore or aft funnel.

== First World War ==
In early 1914 when displaced by G-class destroyers she joined the 9th Destroyer Flotilla based at Chatham tendered to HMS St George. The 9th Flotilla was a patrol flotilla tasked with anti-submarine and counter-mining patrols in the Firth of Forth area. On 16 December 1914 under division leader HMS Doon along with HMS Waveney, HMS Test and HMS Moy under the command of Lieutenant C. C. Naylor were sent to patrol off Hartlepool. During the German Battlecruiser raid on Hartlepool, she was damaged by German shellfire. She was struck by fragments from a shell, bursting short and superficial suffered splinter damage and no casualties.

On 8th June 1915 she rammed the main periscope of U 25 near Newcastle, forcing the Germman submarine to abort her mission and turn back to the base after only three days at sea.

In August 1915 with the amalgamation of the 9th and 7th Flotillas she was deployed to the 7th Destroyer Flotilla based at the River Humber. She remained employed on the Humber Patrol participating in counter-mining operations and anti-submarine patrols for the remainder of the war.

== Disposition ==
In 1919 HMS Moy was paid off then laid up in reserve awaiting disposal. On 27 May 1919 she was sold to T Oakley for scrapping.

She was not awarded a Battle Honour for her service.

== Pennant Numbers ==
Pennant Number	From	To
N02	6 Dec 1914	1 Sep 1915
D25	1 Sep 1915	1 Jan 1918
D58	1 Jan 1918	13 Sep 1918
H76	13 Sep 1918	22 Oct 1919

== Bibliography ==
- Chesneau, Roger & Kolesnik, Eugene M., eds. (1979). Conway's All The World's Fighting Ships 1860–1905. London: Conway Maritime Press. ISBN 0-85177-133-5.
- Colledge, J. J.; Warlow, Ben (2006) [1969]. Ships of the Royal Navy: The Complete Record of All Fighting Ships of the Royal Navy from the 15th Century to the Present (3rd Rev ed.). London: Chatham Publishing. ISBN 978-1-86176-281-8. OCLC 67375475.
- Dittmar, F.J.; Colledge, J. J. (1972). British Warships 1914–1919. Shepperton, UK: Ian Allan. ISBN 0-7110-0380-7.
- Friedman, Norman (2009). British Destroyers: From Earliest Days to the Second World War. Barnsley, UK: Seaforth Publishing. ISBN 978-1-84832-049-9.
- Gardiner, Robert & Gray, Randal, eds. (1985). Conway's All The World's Fighting Ships 1906–1921. London: Conway Maritime Press. ISBN 0-85177-245-5.
- Manning, T. D. (1961). The British Destroyer. London: Putnam & Co. OCLC 6470051.
- March, Edgar J. (1966). British Destroyers: A History of Development, 1892–1953; Drawn by Admiralty Permission From Official Records & Returns, Ships' Covers & Building Plans. London: Seeley Service. OCLC 164893555.
