= Scarborough Maritime Heritage Centre =

Museum in Scarborough, North Yorkshire, England

- Location within North Yorkshire
- Established: 12 December 2009
- Location: Scarborough, England
- Coordinates: 54.283483°N 0.394665°W
- Website: Official website

The Scarborough Maritime Heritage Centre (SMHC), is a museum situated in Scarborough, North Yorkshire, England, and opened on 12 December 2009. The centre reveals the town's maritime history to residents and visitors. Five years in the making, this "museum of the sea" has gathered a huge collection of photographs, historical documents and artefacts about Scarborough's and Yorkshire's coast maritime life.

== About ==
The Scarborough Maritime Heritage Centre was officially opened by the mayor of Scarborough, Councillor Bill Chatt in 2009. It became a registered charity on 11 November 2011, and is listed on the Localgiving.com website.

The SMHC won the Scarborough Mayor’s Big Thank You award for Artistic and Cultural Development three times in a row between 2010 and 2012, and the Max Payne Award for Outstanding Achievement. The SMHC website was voted 'Best Maritime Family History' website by the BBC TV's Who Do You Think You Are magazine readers in 2011. In 2016, Scarborough Maritime Heritage Centre received the Queen's Award for voluntary service. The highest honour, which a voluntary organisation can achieve.

The centre is run by a group of Directors, Committee Members and Trustees along with 24 volunteers who staff the Centre during its opening hours. The centre is open on Wednesdays to Sundays and entrance is free.

== Founding Members ==
- Mark Vesey, Chairman
- Lindy Rowley, Vice-Chairman
- John Rushton
- David Normandale
- Jim Spencer
- Maria Royle
- Faith Young, Secretary

== Activity ==
The Scarborough Maritime Heritage Centre works in close partnership with the local community and is actively engaged in promoting the town's historical and cultural life, participating in major annual events such as Coastival, Armed Forces Day and SeaFest.

They organise exhibitions and events to share information with people who are interested in the history of Scarborough, North Yorkshire. They display a variety of documents and memorabilia, as well as oral history recordings from previous generations.

Exhibitions change every 3 months and have included topics such as: Shipbuilding, Superstitions, Smuggling, World War One and the 1914 bombardment, Tuna & Herring fishing, The RNLI lifeboat, Royal Naval Patrol Service, Maritime Artists and even the town's connections to the Titanic. Members of the public who are interested in sharing their stories or knowledge are able to donate or lend memorabilia to the Centre for other people to see.
