= Ralph Seymour =

Ralph Seymour may refer to:

- Ralph Seymour (Royal Navy officer) (1886–1922), British naval officer
- Ralph Fletcher Seymour (1876–1966), American artist, author and publisher
- Ralph Seymour (actor) (born 1956), American actor
