= Ralph Seymour (Royal Navy officer) =

British navy officer (1886–1922)

Commander Ralph Seymour CMG DSO
- Born: 6 January 1886
- Died: 4 October 1922 (aged 36)
- Allegiance: United Kingdom
- Branch: Royal Navy
- Service years: 1902-1922
- Rank: Commander
- Conflicts: World War I: Battle of Dogger Bank (1916); Battle of Jutland

Commander Ralph Frederick Seymour, CMG, DSO (6 January 1886 – 4 October 1922) was a British Royal Navy officer in the First World War.

== Family ==
Seymour was the fourth child and first son of Sir Horace Alfred Damer Seymour, KCB (1843–1902), and Elizabeth Mary Romilly (1859–1950). His father had been private secretary to Gladstone during 1880–1885, a Commissioner of Customs and Deputy Master of the Mint.

The family had numerous aristocratic and naval connections. Ralph's great-grandfather was Vice-Admiral Lord Hugh Seymour (a younger son of the 1st Marquess of Hertford), and he was descended in the male line from the 1st Duke of Somerset, Lord Protector under King Edward VI. He was also a nephew by marriage of the 5th Earl Spencer, First Lord of the Admiralty in the 1890s, and was thus also distantly related to Winston Churchill; his eldest sister Horatia (1881–1966) was one of the closest friends of Churchill's wife Clementine. It has been suggested that it was the Churchill connection that brought Lieutenant Seymour to the attention of Beatty, who had been Churchill's Naval Secretary in 1912.

== Naval career ==
He entered the Royal Navy, and was on 1 October 1902 posted as a midshipman to HMS St George, serving in the Home Fleet. The following month, he was temporarily posted to HMS Revenge, flagship of the Home Fleet, and from February 1903 he served on the new HMS Russell on the Mediterranean station. He was promoted to lieutenant on 15 December 1906.

Throughout the First World War he served as Flag Lieutenant to Admiral Sir David Beatty, despite the fact that he did not possess a full training in signalling. A badly-worded signal he sent during the German battlecruiser raid on Scarborough, Hartlepool and Whitby on 16 December 1914 caused Beatty's scouting forces to break off contact with the enemy, thus prematurely ending the pursuit. During the Battle of Dogger Bank and the Battle of Jutland he was responsible for sending flag signals so ineptly worded that, after the event, they were considered to have diminished the British success in those conflicts.

Beatty remained loyal and supportive of Seymour during and after the war, and took him to the Admiralty when he became First Sea Lord. After this, however, when Beatty's actions at Jutland began to receive hostile scrutiny, his attitude to Seymour changed and became much more negative. Seymour suffered a nervous breakdown, and was invalided out of the Navy in 1922. He committed suicide by jumping off Black Rock, Brighton, a landmark near his home since redeveloped into Brighton Marina.
