= HMS Gala =

Yarrow type River-class destroyer of the Royal Navy

History

United Kingdom
- Name: HMS Gala
- Ordered: 1903 – 1904 Naval Estimates
- Builder: Yarrows, Poplar
- Laid down: 1 February 1904
- Launched: 7 January 1905
- Commissioned: June 1905
- Fate: 27 April 1908 Sunk in collision with HMS Attentive

General characteristics
- Class & type: Yarrow Type River-class destroyer
- Displacement: 590 long tons (599 t) standard; 660 long tons (671 t) full load
- Length: 231 ft 4 in (70.51 m) o/a
- Beam: 23 ft 6 in (7.16 m) beam
- Draught: 7 ft 2.5 in (2.197 m) draught
- Installed power: 7,500 ihp (5,600 kW)
- Propulsion: 4 × Yarrow type water tube boilers; 2 × vertical triple-expansion steam engines; 2 × shafts
- Speed: 25.5 kn (47.2 km/h)
- Complement: 70 officers and men
- Armament: 1 × QF 12-pounder 12 cwt Mark I; 5 × QF 6-pounder 8 cwt; 2 × single tubes for 18-inch (450mm) torpedoes

HMS Gala was a Yarrow type River-class destroyer ordered by the Royal Navy under the 1903 – 1904 Naval Estimates. Named after the Gala Waters in the Scottish Borders area south of Edinburgh, she was the first Royal Navy ship to carry this name. She was launched on 7 January 1905 and was accidentally sunk in a collision with the cruiser Attentive on 28 April 1908.

== Construction ==
Gala was one of two River-class destroyers that were ordered from Yarrow as part of an order of 15 Rivers under the 1903–1904 construction programme for the Royal Navy. The ship was laid down on 1 February 1904 at Yarrow's Poplar, London shipyard and launched on 7 January 1905. She was completed in June 1905, being delivered to Chatham Dockyard on 28 June 1905 and commissioning there on 30 June. Gala was the first Royal Navy ship to use this name.

The design of Gala was based on the River-class destroyers ordered from Yarrow in the 1901–1902 programme (in particular Ribble). As such, Gala was 231 ft 3 in (70.49 m)-231 ft 4 in (70.51 m) long overall and 225 ft 0 in (68.58 m), with a beam of 23 ft 6 in (7.16 m) and a draught of 7 ft 2 1/2 in (2.20 m). Displacement was 590 long tons (600 t) light and 660 long tons (670 t) full load. Four Yarrow water-tube boilers fed steam to two sets of four-cylinder triple expansion steam engines. The machinery was rated at 7,500 ihp (5,600 kW), with the design required to reach a contract speed of 25.5 kn (29.3 mph; 47.2 km/h), reaching a speed of 25.9 kn (29.8 mph; 48.0 km/h) during sea trials. Four funnels were fitted, in two closely spaced groups.

The original armament of the Rivers, including Gala was the same as the 30-knotter torpedo boat destroyers that preceded them (the B-, C- and D-classes), with a gun armament of one QF 12-pounder 12 cwt naval gun and five 6-pounder (57 mm) guns and two 18-inch (450-mm) torpedo tubes. While earlier ships of the class had two of the 6-pounder guns mounted on sponsons, these guns were moved on Gala and other 1903–1904 ships to the ship's forecastle, where they were drier. In 1906, based on lessons learned during the Russo-Japanese War, where 6-pounder guns were of limited use, the Admiralty decided to upgrade the armament by landing the five 6-pounder naval guns and shipping three QF 12-pounder 8 cwt guns, with two of the new guns on the forecastle, and the third on the ship's centreline aft. The ships of the class were modified with the new armament between 1907 and 1908.

== Pre-war ==
On commissioning, Gala joined the Reserve Destroyer Division based at Sheerness. In October 1905, Gala was ordered to transfer to Portland, where she was to serve as the Senior Officer's ship of the Second Destroyer Division. In December 1906, Gala was listed as being in commission with a nucleus crew at Portsmouth. She was later assigned to the East Coast Destroyer Flotilla of the 1st Fleet and based at Harwich.

== Loss ==
On the afternoon of 27 April 1908, the Eastern Destroyer Flotilla, consisting of 15 vessels, in company with the scouts Adventure and Attentive, left Harwich for the purpose of firing exercise and night manoeuvres. A little after midnight all the vessels having their lights masked, Gala collided with Attentive being struck by the latter's ram in the after part of the engine room and cut in two but only one man was killed. Attentive afterwards collided with the destroyer Ribble and holed her below the waterline. She had to put into Sheerness for repairs. While it was attempted to tow the two parts of Gala to shallow water, it was unsuccessful, with both parts sinking.

== Bibliography ==
- Chesneau, Roger & Kolesnik, Eugene M., eds. (1979). Conway's All The World's Fighting Ships 1860–1905. London: Conway Maritime Press. ISBN 0-85177-133-5.
- Colledge, J. J.; Warlow, Ben (2006) [1969]. Ships of the Royal Navy: The Complete Record of All Fighting Ships of the Royal Navy from the 15th Century to the Present (3rd Rev ed.). London: Chatham Publishing. ISBN 978-1-86176-281-8. OCLC 67375475.
- Fock, Harald (1981). Schwarze Gesellen: Band 2: Zerstörer bis 1914 (in German). Herford, Germany: Koelers Verlagsgesellschaft mBH. ISBN 3-7822-0206-6.
- Friedman, Norman (2009). British Destroyers: From Earliest Days to the Second World War. Barnsley, UK: Seaforth Publishing. ISBN 978-1-84832-049-9.
- Leyland, John; Brassey, T. A., eds. (1906). The Naval Annual 1906. Portsmouth, UK: J. Griffin and Co.
- Manning, T. D. (1961). The British Destroyer. London: Putnam & Co. OCLC 6470051.
