= HMS Ribble (1904) =

Destroyer of the Royal Navy

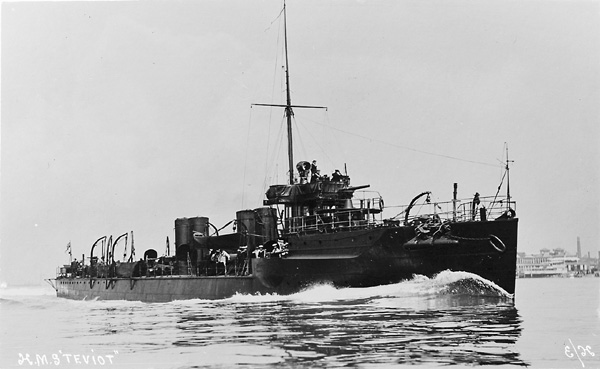
- HMS Teviot, sister-ship to Ribble

History

United Kingdom
- Name: Ribble
- Ordered: 1901 – 1902 Naval Estimates
- Builder: Yarrows, Poplar
- Laid down: 4 July 1902
- Launched: 19 March 1904
- Commissioned: June 1904
- Out of service: 1919
- Honours and awards: Dardanelles 1915 - 1916
- Fate: Sold for breaking, 29 July 1920

General characteristics
- Class & type: Yarrow-type River-class destroyer
- Displacement: 590 long tons (599 t) standard; 660 long tons (671 t) full load
- Length: 231 ft 4 in (70.51 m) o/a
- Beam: 23 ft 6 in (7.16 m)
- Draught: 7 ft 2.5 in (2.197 m)
- Installed power: 7,000 shp (5,200 kW)
- Propulsion: 4 × Yarrow type water tube boilers; 2 × vertical triple-expansion steam engines; 2 shafts
- Speed: 25.5 kn (47.2 km/h)
- Range: 130 tons coal; 1,620 nmi (3,000 km) at 11 kn (20 km/h)
- Complement: 70 officers and men
- Armament: 1 × QF 12-pounder 12 cwt Mark I, mounting P Mark I; 3 × QF 12-pounder 8 cwt, mounting G Mark I (added in 1906); 5 × QF 6-pounder 8 cwt (removed in 1906); 2 × single tubes for 18-inch (450 mm) torpedoes

Service record
- Part of: East Coast Destroyer Flotilla – 1905; China Station – 1910; Assigned E Class – Aug 1912 – Oct 1913; 5th Destroyer Flotilla – December 1914
- Operations: World War I 1914 - 1918

HMS Ribble was a Yarrow-type River-class destroyer ordered by the Royal Navy under the 1901 – 1902 Naval Estimates. Named after the River Ribble in northern England, she was the first ship to carry this name in the Royal Navy.

== Construction ==
She was laid down on 4 July 1902 at the Yarrow shipyard at Poplar and launched on 19 March 1904. Her build was completed in June 1904. Her original armament was to be the same as the turtleback torpedo boat destroyers that preceded her. In 1906 the Admiralty decided to upgrade the armament by fitting three 12-pounder 8 hundredweight (cwt) guns instead of the five 6-pounder guns. Two were mounted abeam at the foc's'le break, and the third gun was mounted on the quarterdeck.

== Service history ==
After commissioning she was assigned to the East Coast Destroyer Flotilla of the 1st Fleet and based at Harwich.

On 27 April 1908 the Eastern Flotilla departed Harwich for live fire and night manoeuvres. During these exercises Attentive rammed and sank Gala then collided with Ribble and holed her below the waterline. She had to put into Sheerness for repairs.

In 1909/1910 she was assigned to the China Station.

On 30 August 1912 the Admiralty directed that all destroyer classes were to be designated by letters. The ships of the River class were assigned to the E class and after 30 September 1913, she was known as an E-class destroyer and had the letter ‘E’ painted on the hull below the bridge area and on either the fore or aft funnel.

In July 1914 she was on China Station based at Hong Kong tendered to HMS Triumph. Ribble was assigned to patrol duties under the command of the commodore at Hong Kong.

With the fall of Qingdao and the sinking of SMS Emden, she was redeployed to the 5th Destroyer Flotilla in the British Mediterranean Fleet in November 1914 accompanying Triumph in support of the Dardanelles Campaign.

On 17 March 1915, she closed on the French battleship Bouvet after she struck a mine in the Dardanelles.

On 25 April 1915, under the command of Lieutenant Commander R W Wilkinson, she supported the landings at ANZAC Cove.

By 10 February 1916 Ribble was on the Smyrna Patrol enforcing the blockade of the Turkish coast from Cape Kaba to latitude 38°30’E, a distance of 200 nautical miles, and including the port of Smyrna. At this time she was based at Port Iero on the island of Lesbos. She remained in the Mediterranean until the end of the war.

In 1919 she returned to home waters, was paid off and laid up in reserve awaiting disposal. On 29 July 1920 she was sold to Thos. W. Ward of Sheffield for breaking, appropriately given her name, on the River Ribble at Preston, Lancashire.

She was awarded the battle honour "Dardanelles 1915 - 1916" for her service

== Bibliography ==
- Chesneau, Roger & Kolesnik, Eugene M., eds. (1979). Conway's All The World's Fighting Ships 1860–1905. London: Conway Maritime Press. ISBN 0-85177-133-5.
- Colledge, J. J.; Warlow, Ben (2006) [1969]. Ships of the Royal Navy: The Complete Record of All Fighting Ships of the Royal Navy from the 15th Century to the Present (3rd Rev ed.). London: Chatham Publishing. ISBN 978-1-86176-281-8. OCLC 67375475.
- Dittmar, F.J.; Colledge, J. J. (1972). British Warships 1914–1919. Shepperton, UK: Ian Allan. ISBN 0-7110-0380-7.
- Friedman, Norman (2009). British Destroyers: From Earliest Days to the Second World War. Barnsley, UK: Seaforth Publishing. ISBN 978-1-84832-049-9.
- Gardiner, Robert & Gray, Randal, eds. (1985). Conway's All The World's Fighting Ships 1906–1921. London: Conway Maritime Press. ISBN 0-85177-245-5.
- Manning, T. D. (1961). The British Destroyer. London: Putnam & Co. OCLC 6470051.
- March, Edgar J. (1966). British Destroyers: A History of Development, 1892–1953; Drawn by Admiralty Permission From Official Records & Returns, Ships' Covers & Building Plans. London: Seeley Service. OCLC 164893555.
