= HMS Attentive (1904) =

Adventure-class cruiser

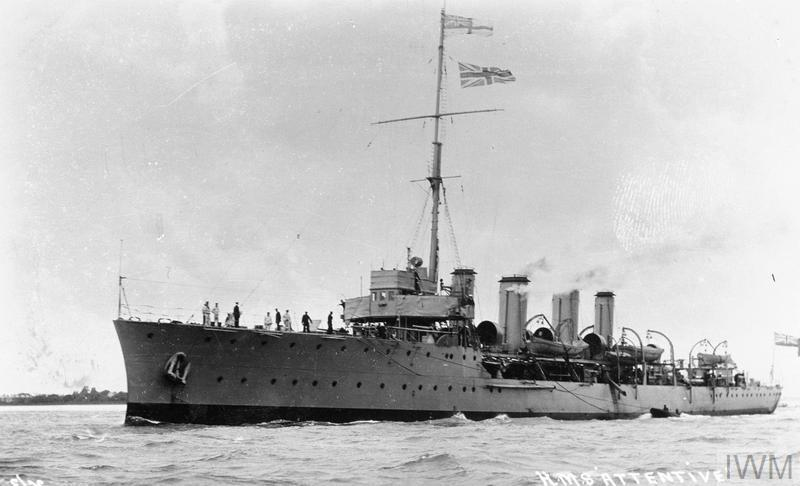
- Attentive prior to the First World War

History

United Kingdom
- Name: Attentive
- Builder: Armstrong Whitworth, Elswick, Tyne and Wear
- Yard number: 748
- Laid down: January 1904
- Launched: 22 November 1904
- Completed: 2 February 1906
- Commissioned: October 1905
- Decommissioned: December 1918
- Fate: Sold for scrap, 12 April 1920

General characteristics (as built)
- Class & type: Adventure-class scout cruiser
- Displacement: 2,670 long tons (2,713 t)
- Length: 374 ft (114.0 m) (p/p)
- Beam: 38 ft 3 in (11.7 m)
- Draught: 12 ft 5 in (3.8 m)
- Installed power: 16,000 ihp (12,000 kW); 12 Yarrow boilers
- Propulsion: 2 Shafts, 2 triple-expansion steam engines
- Speed: 25 knots (46 km/h; 29 mph)
- Range: 2,370 nmi (4,390 km; 2,730 mi) at 10 knots (19 km/h; 12 mph)
- Complement: 289
- Armament: 10 × QF 12-pdr (3 in (76 mm)) guns; 8 × QF 3 pdr (47 mm) guns; 2 × 18 in (450 mm) torpedo tubes
- Armour: Deck: .75–2 in (19–51 mm); Conning tower: 3 in (76 mm)

HMS Attentive was one of two Adventure-class scout cruisers built for the Royal Navy during the first decade of the 20th century. Completed in 1905 the ship was placed in reserve until she was commissioned in 1907 as part of the Home Fleet. She then spent the next seven years moving on and off of active service in British waters. The ship sank one destroyer and damaged two others in collisions. Attentive was assigned to coastal defence duties when the First World War began in 1914, and spent most of the war assigned to the Dover Patrol. She played a minor role in the Zeebrugge Raid in early 1918 and was then assigned to escort convoys to Gibraltar. The ship was sent to the White Sea later in the year to support the North Russia intervention in the Russian Civil War. Attentive paid off at the end of 1918 and was sold for scrap in 1920.

== Design and description ==
The Adventure-class ships were one of four classes of scout cruisers ordered by the Admiralty. These ships were intended to work with destroyer flotillas, leading their torpedo attacks and backing them up when attacked by other destroyers, although they quickly became less useful as destroyer speeds increased before the First World War. They had a length between perpendiculars of 374 feet (114.0 m), a beam of 38 feet 3 inches (11.7 m) and a draught of 12 feet 5 inches (3.8 m). The ships displaced 2,670 long tons (2,713 t) at normal load and 2,893 long tons (2,939 t) at deep load. Their crew consisted of 289 officers and ratings.

The ship was powered by a pair of three-cylinder triple-expansion steam engines, each driving one shaft, using steam provided by a dozen Yarrow boilers. The engines were designed to produce a total of 16,000 indicated horsepower (12,000 kW) which was intended to give a maximum speed of 25 knots (46 km/h; 29 mph). When Attentive ran her sea trials, she reached a speed of 25.9 knots (48.0 km/h; 29.8 mph) from 16,212 ihp (12,089 kW) for eight hours. The Adventure-class cruisers carried enough coal to give them a range of 2,370 nautical miles (4,390 km; 2,730 mi) at 10 knots (19 km/h; 12 mph).

The main armament of the Adventure class consisted of ten quick-firing (QF) 12-pounder 18-cwt guns. (Note: "Cwt" is the abbreviation for hundredweight, 18 cwt referring to the weight of the gun.) Three guns were mounted abreast on the forecastle and the quarterdeck, with the remaining four guns positioned port and starboard amidships. They also carried eight 3-pounder (47 mm (1.9 in)) Hotchkiss guns and two above-water 18-inch (450 mm) torpedo tubes, one on each broadside. The ships' protective deck armour ranged in thickness from 0.75 to 2 inches (19 to 51 mm) and the conning tower had armour 3 inches (76 mm) inches thick. T

== Construction and career ==
Attentive was laid down by Armstrong Whitworth at their yards at Elswick shipyard on 8 January 1904 as yard number 748 and launched on 22 November. After completion in October 1905, the ship was placed in reserve; two additional 12-pounder guns were added and the 3-pounder guns were replaced with six QF 6-pounder Hotchkiss guns not long afterwards. She was commissioned in March 1907 for service with the Nore Division of the Home Fleet. On 7 August 1907 (one source states it occurred on 6 August) she collided with the destroyer HMS Quail, badly damaging Quail's bow. The following year, on 27 April 1908, Attentive was involved in a series of accidents during a live-firing exercise at night with the Eastern Destroyer Flotilla. She accidentally rammed and sank the destroyer Gala, killing one crewman. The hapless Attentive then collided with the destroyer Ribble, holing her hull.

After repairs she was recommissioned at Chatham in July 1909 and became leader of the 3rd Destroyer Flotilla, then joined the 2nd Destroyer Flotilla in 1910. About 1911–1912, her main guns were replaced by nine 4-inch (102 mm) guns, arranged four on each broadside and the remaining gun on the quarterdeck. After refit in August 1912 at HM Dockyard, Devonport, Attentive was assigned to the 3rd Light Cruiser Squadron in 1913 for the annual manoeuvres and was then transferred to lead the 9th Destroyer Flotilla at Portsmouth. The ship joined the 6th Destroyer Flotilla at Dover later that year. During the Curragh incident of 1914 the ship was deployed to Ireland with HMS Pathfinder, and First Lord of the Admiralty Winston Churchill threatened to "pour enough shot and shell into Belfast to reduce it to ruins" if the Ulster Volunteers revolted against the British Armed Forces.

She spent most of the First World War as part of the Dover Patrol. On 7 September 1915 she became an early victim of air power. While supporting a naval bombardment of German positions at Ostend, Attentive was bombed, suffering eight casualties. The air attack forced the squadron to briefly disperse, before returning to carry out the bombardment. Attentive screened the raiding force during the Zeebrugge Raid on 25 April 1918 and recovered part of the ship's crew of the concrete-filled cruiser Sirius after she had detonated her demolition charges. Later that year the ship began escorting convoys to Gibraltar. She spent a few months off Murmansk, North Russia, supporting British forces intervening in the Russian Civil War. Attentive was paid off in December 1918, after hostilities ended, and was sold for scrap in April 1920.

== Bibliography ==
- Bacon, Reginald (n.d.). The Dover Patrol 1915–1917. Vol. I. London: Hutchinson & Co. ISBN 1-86176-022-1. OCLC 59037180.
- Brook, Peter (1999). Warships for Export: Armstrong Warships 1867 – 1927. Gravesend, Kent, UK: World Ship Society. ISBN 0-905617-89-4.
- Chesneau, Roger & Kolesnik, Eugene M., eds. (1979). Conway's All the World's Fighting Ships 1860–1905. Greenwich: Conway Maritime Press. ISBN 0-8317-0302-4.
- Colledge, J. J.; Warlow, Ben (2006) [1969]. Ships of the Royal Navy: The Complete Record of All Fighting Ships of the Royal Navy from the 15th Century to the Present (3rd Rev ed.). London: Chatham Publishing. ISBN 978-1-86176-281-8. OCLC 67375475.
- Friedman, Norman (2009). British Destroyers From Earliest Days to the Second World War. Annapolis, Maryland: Naval Institute Press. ISBN 978-1-59114-081-8.
- Friedman, Norman (2011). Naval Weapons of World War One. Barnsley, South Yorkshire, UK: Seaforth. ISBN 978-1-84832-100-7.
- Gardiner, Robert & Gray, Randal, eds. (1985). Conway's All the World's Fighting Ships 1906–1921. Annapolis, Maryland: Naval Institute Press. ISBN 0-85177-245-5.
- Lyon, David (2001). The First Destroyers. London: Caxton Editions. ISBN 1-84067-364-8.
- McBride, K. D. (1994). "The Royal Navy 'Scout' Class of 1904–05". Warship International. XXXI (3): 260–281. ISSN 0043-0374.
- McGreal, Stephen (2007). Zeebrugge and Ostend Raids 1918. Barnsley, UK: Pen & Sword Military. ISBN 978-1-84415608-5.
- Morris, Douglas (1987). Cruisers of the Royal and Commonwealth Navies Since 1879. Liskeard, UK: Maritime Books. ISBN 0-907771-35-1.
