= HMS St George (1892) =

Cruiser of the Royal Navy

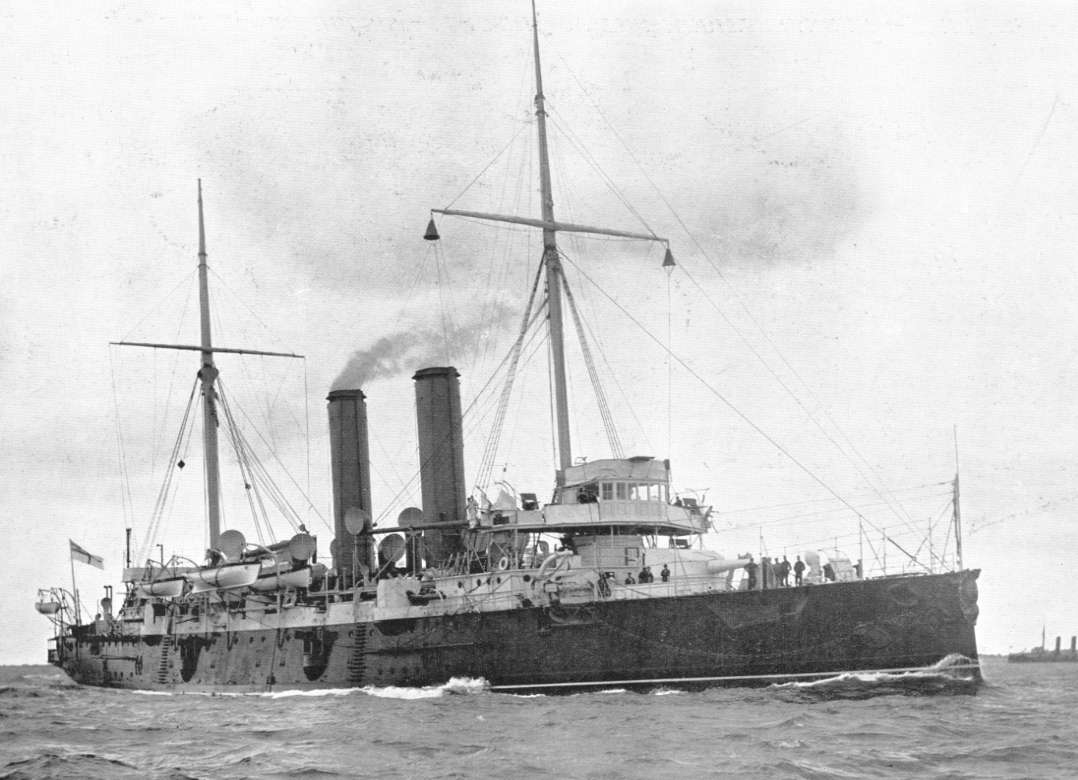

History

United Kingdom
- Name: HMS St George
- Builder: C & W Earle, Hull
- Laid down: 23 April 1890
- Launched: 23 June 1892
- Reclassified: Depot ship 1909
- Fate: Sold for breaking up 1 July 1920

General characteristics
- Class & type: Edgar-class cruiser
- Displacement: 7,350 tons
- Length: 387.5 ft (118.1 m)
- Beam: 60 ft (18 m)
- Armament: 2 × BL 9.2-inch (234 mm) guns; 10 × QF 6-inch (152 mm) guns; 12 × 6 pdr guns

HMS St George was a first class cruiser of the Edgar class. She was launched on 23 June 1892.

== Service history ==
In 1895 St George was on the West Coast of Africa. Together with two Redbreast-class gunboats and two local steamers, crew from the ship in one of her boats (Note: Presumably her draught prevented her approaching Nembe directly.) took part in a reprisal at Nimbi in the Niger delta against King Koko for the Akassa raid.

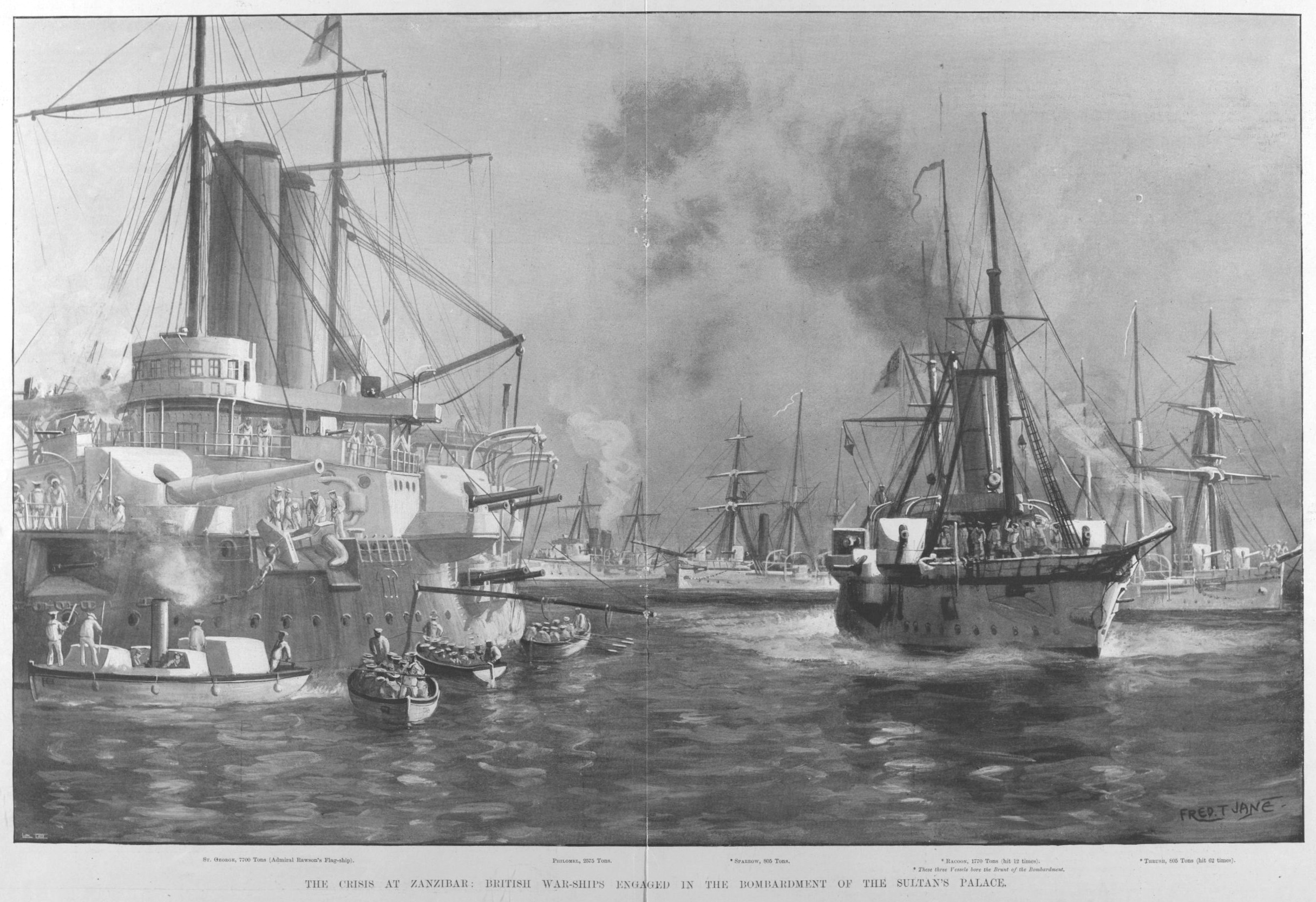
The crisis at Zanzibar when British warships bombarded the Sultan's Palace – St George on the left

St George took part in the 40-minute-long Anglo-Zanzibar War in 1896. The obsolete armed yacht HHS Glasgow of Zanzibar fired upon a British flotilla led by St George, also comprising Philomel, Racoon, Sparrow and Thrush. The response sank Glasgow with a hole below the waterline. With a Union Jack flying over the sinking yacht in surrender, the flotilla launched lifeboats to rescue the crew of Glasgow which would lie at the bottom of Zanzibar Town Harbour until 1912.

She served in the Channel Fleet. In 1901, she was one of two escort ships for the royal yacht Ophir, which carried the Duke and Duchess of Cornwall and York (later King George V and Queen Mary) during their tour of the British Empire.

Following the end of this tour, the captain of Ophir, Commodore Alfred Winsloe, reverted to his position as Commodore commanding the Cruiser squadron, and was in late 1901 posted to St George, which thus became the lead ship of the squadron and carried his broad pennant. In May 1902 she was taken into Portsmouth for a refit. She took part in the fleet review at Spithead on 16 August 1902 for the coronation of King Edward VII, and in September that year was part of a squadron visiting Nauplia and Crete for combined manoeuvres in the Mediterranean Sea. After her return to Portsmouth in late October, she paid off on 15 November and her crew was transferred to HMS Good Hope. In March 1903 she was moved to Belfast for a refit at the works of Workman, Clark and Company.

She was the flagship of the Cape & West Africa Station (Rear-Admiral Harry Rawson) based at Simon's Town, and served in the First World War. Sidney R. Olivier commanded the ship between 2 November 1915 and 1919.

She was designated as a depot ship in 1909, and sold for breaking up at Plymouth on 1 July 1920.
