= 7th Destroyer Flotilla =

- Active: November, 1911 – May 1939
- Country: United Kingdom
- Branch: Royal Navy
- Size: Flotilla

Commanders
- First: Captain Arthur Hulbert
- Last: Captain Llewellyn Morgan

The 7th Destroyer Flotilla, also styled as the Seventh Destroyer Flotilla, was a military formation of the Royal Navy from 1911 to 1939.

== History ==
The flotilla was first formed in November 1911, and was disbanded in May 1939, before the outbreak of the Second World War. Its first commander was Captain Arthur Hulbert, and its last was Captain Llewellyn Morgan.

At the start of the First World War, the 7th Flotilla was deployed to the Humber for operations off the East coast of Britain; protecting ports against attacks and minelaying and countering enemy raids.

== Administration ==
Captains (D) afloat, 7th Destroyer Flotilla

Captain (D) afloat is a Royal Navy appointment of an operational commander of a destroyer flotilla or squadron.

== Composition ==
- HMS Leopard - B-class destroyer, sent to Scapa Flow November 1914
- HMS Lively - C-class, sent to Scapa Flow November 1914

== Sources ==
- Field, Andrew (1999). Royal Navy Strategy in the Far East 1919–1939: Planning for War Against Japan. Cambridge, England: Routledge. ISBN 9781135774080.
- Harley, Simon; Lovell, Tony. (2018) "Seventh Destroyer Flotilla (Royal Navy) - The Dreadnought Project". www.dreadnoughtproject.org. Harley and Lovell.
- Manning, T. D. (1961). The British Destroyer. London: Putnam & Co. OCLC 6470051.
- Whitby, Michael (2011). Commanding Canadians: The Second World War Diaries of A.F.C. Layard. Vancouver, Canada: UBC Press. ISBN 9780774840378.
