= HMS Lightning =

Ten ships of the Royal Navy have been named HMS Lightning.

- The first HMS Lightning (1691) was an 8-gun fire ship launched in 1691 and captured by the French in 1705.
- The second HMS Lightning (1740) was an 8-gun bomb vessel launched in 1740 and captured off Livorno during the War of the Austrian Succession in 1746.
- The 14-gun sloop HMS Viper (1746), launched in 1746, was converted to a fire ship and renamed Lightning in 1755. She was sold in 1762
- The 14-gun sloop HMS Sylph (1776), purchased in 1776, was converted to a fire ship and renamed Lightning in 1779. She was sold in 1783.
- The fifth HMS Lightning (1806) was a Thais-class fireship launched in 1806, converted to a sloop in 1808, and sold in 1816.
- The sixth HMS Lightning (1823), launched in 1823, was a paddle steamer, one of the first steam-powered ships on the Navy List. She served initially as a packet ship, but was later converted into an oceanographic survey vessel.
- The seventh HMS Lightning (1829) was an 18-gun sloop launched in 1829, renamed Larne in 1832, and broken up in 1866.
- The eighth HMS Lightning (1876), was a torpedo boat, built by John Thornycroft. She was the first seagoing vessel to be armed with self-propelled torpedoes. She was later known as TB-1.
- The ninth HMS Lightning (1895), launched in 1895, was a Janus-class destroyer. She served in World War I until she struck a mine in 1915 that sank her.
- The tenth HMS Lightning (G55), launched in 1940, was an L-class destroyer that served in World War II. The German motor torpedo boat S-55 torpedoed and sank her on 12 March 1943 in the Strait of Sicily.

== See also ==
- HMS Thunder
