= HMS Porcupine =

Nine vessels of the United Kingdom's Royal Navy have been named HMS Porcupine, after the porcupine, a rodent belonging to the families Erethizontidae or Hystricidae.

- HMS Porcupine (1746) was a 16-gun sloop launched in 1743, purchased in 1746, and sold in 1763. She became the mercantile Minerva, which in 1768 traded between London and Africa.
- HMS Porcupine (1777) was a 24-gun post ship launched in 1777 and broken up in 1805.
- HMS Porcupine was a 16-gun sloop purchased in Jamaica in 1777 and sold in 1788.
- HMS Porcupine (1807) was a 22-gun post ship launched in 1807 and sold in 1816.
- HMS Porcupine was to have been a 28-gun sixth rate; ordered in 1819, she was canceled in 1832.
- HMS Porcupine (1844) was a wooden paddle wheel surveying vessel built at Deptford and sold in 1883.
- HMS Porcupine (1895) was a Janus-class destroyer launched by Palmers in 1895 that served in home waters and was sold in 1920.
- HMS Porcupine (G93) was a P-class destroyer launched in 1941 and torpedoed by U-602 in the Mediterranean Sea in 1942.
- HMS Porcupine was to have been a survey ship, renamed in 1967 as HMS Barracouta, but the order was cancelled in 1967.
