= Francis Walter Despard Twigg =

Royal Navy officer (1883–1951)

Francis Walter Despard Twigg OBE
- Born: 1883; Chatham, Kent
- Died: 1951 (aged 67–68)
- Military career
- Allegiance: United Kingdom
- Rank: Captain
- Awards: OBE; Legion of Merit

Captain Francis Walter Despard Twigg (1883–1951) was a senior officer in the Royal Navy. He was made OBE in 1919 for valuable services in Command of HMS Lysander as a Senior Officer of Convoy Escorts. In 1946 he was awarded the Legion of Merit, Degree of Legionnaire.

== Life ==
Francis Walter Despard Twigg was born in Chatham, Kent, on 17 February 1883. He was the son of Surgeon George Despard Twigg (RN) and educated at Bedford Modern School.

Twigg was made Commander of HMS Dee between 1913 and 1915, and later trained in signalling duties at the Portsmouth Signalling School. Twigg was appointed Commander of HMS Lysander in 1917, and Captain of HMS Spindrift in 1919. He was made Captain of the S-class destroyer HMS Stormcloud in 1919, Captain of HMS Godetia between 1922 and 1925, and later Captain of HMS Greenwich.

Twigg was made OBE in 1919 for valuable services in Command of HMS Lysander as a Senior Officer of Convoy Escorts. In 1946 he was awarded the Legion of Merit, Degree of Legionnaire.
