= HMS Fawn (1897) =

Destroyer of the Royal Navy

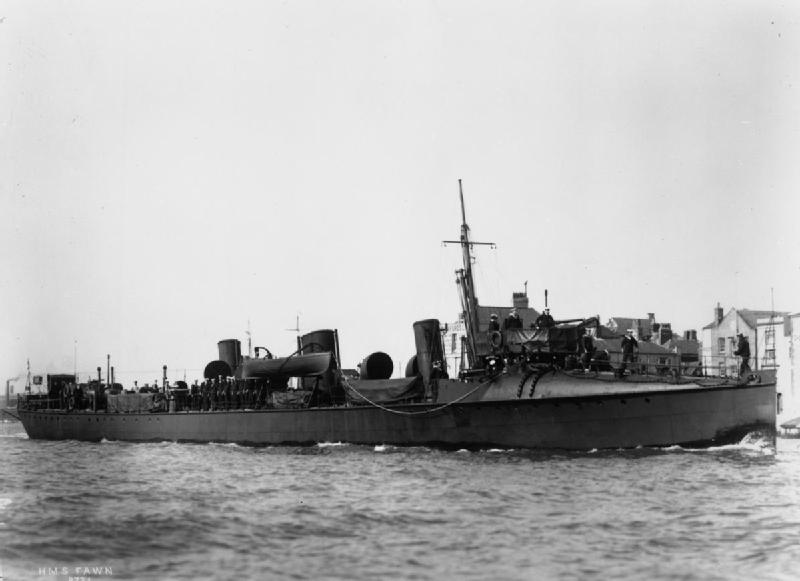
- HMS Fawn

History

United Kingdom
- Name: HMS Fawn
- Ordered: 1896 – 1897 Naval Estimates
- Builder: Palmers Shipbuilding and Iron Company Jarrow-on-Tyne
- Laid down: 5 September 1896
- Launched: 13 April 1897
- Commissioned: December 1898
- Out of service: Laid up in reserve 1919
- Honours and awards: Belgian Coast 1914 - 1918
- Fate: Sold for breaking, 23 July 1919

General characteristics
- Class & type: Palmer three funnel, 30 knot destroyer
- Displacement: 390 long tons (396 t) standard; 420 long tons (427 t) full load
- Length: 219 ft 9 in (66.98 m) o/a
- Beam: 20 ft 9 in (6.32 m)
- Draught: 8 ft 11 in (2.72 m)
- Installed power: 6,000 shp (4,500 kW)
- Propulsion: 4 × Reed water tube boilers; 2 × vertical triple-expansion steam engines; 2 shafts
- Speed: 30 kn (56 km/h)
- Range: 80 tons coal; 1,490 nmi (2,760 km) at 11 kn (20 km/h)
- Complement: 60 officers and men
- Armament: 1 × QF 12-pounder 12 cwt Mark I L/40 naval gun on a P Mark I low angle mount; 5 × QF 6-pdr 8 cwt L/40 naval gun on a Mark I* low angle mount; 2 × single tubes for 18-inch (450mm) torpedoes

Service record
- Operations: World War I 1914 - 1918

HMS Fawn was a Palmer three funnel, 30 knot destroyer ordered by the Royal Navy under the 1896 – 1897 Naval Estimates. She was the fourth ship to carry this name.

== Construction ==
Fawn was laid down on 5 September 1896 at the Palmer shipyard at Jarrow-on-Tyne and launched on 13 April 1897. During her builder's trials she made her contracted speed requirement. She was completed and accepted by the Royal Navy in December 1898.

== Pre-War ==
Fawn spent her early operational career in Home Waters operating with the Channel Fleet as part of the Portsmouth Instructional Flotilla. Lieutenant Christopher Powell Metcalfe was in command from 15 January 1901, but was succeeded only two months later in March that year. She was commissioned at Portsmouth on 27 August 1901 by Lieutenant and Commander J. A. Ingles and assigned to the Channel Fleet. On 2 April 1902 she was commissioned to relieve the destroyer Hardy at the Mediterranean station, under the command of Lieutenant Robert W. Myburgh. She left Portsmouth in late May, arriving at Malta on 9 June 1902. In September 1902 she visited Nauplia with other ships of the fleet, and in early January 1903 there was a similar three-weeks cruise in the Greek islands around Corfu. She returned to Home Waters in 1906.

On 30 August 1912, the Admiralty directed all destroyer classes were to be designated by alpha characters starting with the letter 'A'. Since her design speed was 30 knots (56 km/h; 35 mph) and she had three funnels, she was assigned to the C class. After 30 September 1913, she was known as a C-class destroyer and had the letter ‘C’ painted on the hull below the bridge area and on either the fore or aft funnel.

== World War I ==
In July 1914 Fawn was deployed in the 6th Destroyer Flotilla based at Dover. In November 1916 she was transferred to the 7th Flotilla on the Humber River. During her deployment there she was involved in anti-submarine and counter-mining patrols.

== Disposition ==
In 1919 Fawn was paid off and laid-up in reserve awaiting disposal. She was sold on 23 July 1919 to Thos. W. Ward of Sheffield for breaking at New Holland, Lincolnshire, on the Humber Estuary.

She was awarded the Battle Honour Belgian Coast 1914 – 18 for her service.

== Pennant numbers ==
Pennant number	From	To
P94	6 Dec 1914	1 Sep 1915
D55	1 Sep 1915	1 Jan 1918
D38	1 Jan 1918	13 Sep 1918
H38	13 Sep 1918	23 Jul 1919

== Bibliography ==
- Chesneau, Roger & Kolesnik, Eugene M., eds. (1979). Conway's All The World's Fighting Ships 1860–1905. London: Conway Maritime Press. ISBN 0-85177-133-5.
- Colledge, J. J.; Warlow, Ben (2006) [1969]. Ships of the Royal Navy: The Complete Record of All Fighting Ships of the Royal Navy from the 15th Century to the Present (3rd Rev ed.). London: Chatham Publishing. ISBN 978-1-86176-281-8. OCLC 67375475.
- Dittmar, F. J. & Colledge, J. J. (1972). British Warships 1914–1919. Shepperton, UK: Ian Allan. ISBN 0-7110-0380-7.
- Friedman, Norman (2009). British Destroyers: From Earliest Days to the Second World War. Barnsley, UK: Seaforth Publishing. ISBN 978-1-84832-049-9.
- Gardiner, Robert & Gray, Randal, eds. (1985). Conway's All The World's Fighting Ships 1906–1921. London: Conway Maritime Press. ISBN 0-85177-245-5.
- Lyon, David (2001) [1996]. The First Destroyers. London: Caxton Editions. ISBN 1-84067-3648.
- Manning, T. D. (1961). The British Destroyer. London: Putnam & Co. OCLC 6470051.
- March, Edgar J. (1966). British Destroyers: A History of Development, 1892–1953; Drawn by Admiralty Permission From Official Records & Returns, Ships' Covers & Building Plans. London: Seeley Service. OCLC 164893555.
