= HMS Exe (1903) =

Destroyer of the Royal Navy

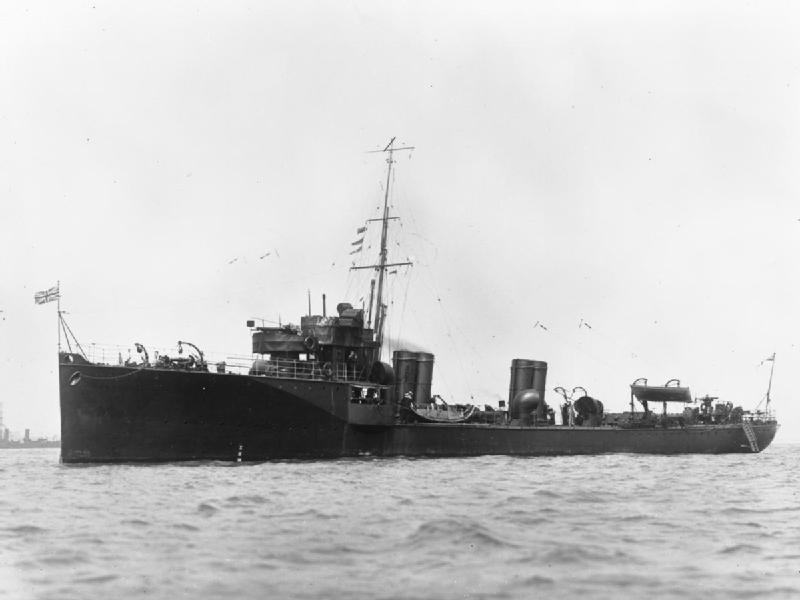
- Exe

History

United Kingdom
- Name: Exe
- Namesake: River Exe
- Ordered: 1901 – 1902 Naval Estimates
- Builder: Palmers Shipbuilding and Iron Company, Jarrow
- Laid down: 14 July 1902
- Launched: 27 April 1903
- Commissioned: March 1904
- Out of service: Laid up in reserve awaiting disposal, 1919
- Fate: Sold, 10 February 1920

General characteristics
- Class & type: River-class destroyer
- Displacement: 550 long tons (559 t) standard; 620 long tons (630 t) full load
- Length: 223 ft 6 in (68.1 m) o/a
- Beam: 23 ft 6 in (7.2 m)
- Draught: 7 ft 4 1/2 in (2.2 m)
- Installed power: 7,000 shp (5,200 kW)
- Propulsion: 4 × Reed water tube boilers; 2 × vertical triple-expansion steam engines; 2 shafts
- Speed: 25.5 kn (47.2 km/h)
- Range: 140 tons coal; 1,620 nmi (3,000 km) at 11 kn (20 km/h)
- Complement: 70 officers and men
- Armament: 1 × QF 12-pounder (12 cwt) Mark I, mounting P Mark I; 3 × QF 12-pounder 8 cwt guns, mounting G Mark I (added in 1906); 5 × QF 6-pounder (8 cwt) guns (removed in 1906); 2 × single tubes for 18-inch (450mm) torpedoes

Service record
- Part of: China Station - 1905; Assigned E class - Aug 1912 - Oct 1913; 9th Destroyer Flotilla - 1914; 7th Destroyer Flotilla - Aug 1915
- Operations: World War I 1914 - 1918

HMS Exe was a River-class destroyer ordered by the Royal Navy under the 1901–1902 Naval Estimates. Named after the River Exe in southern England flowing through Exeter in the County of Devon, she was the first ship to carry this name in the Royal Navy. She served on the China Station before World War I and in the North Sea during the war. She was sold in 1920.

== Construction ==
She was laid down on 14 July 1902 at the Palmer’s shipyard at Jarrow and launched on 27 April 1903. She was completed in March 1904. Her original armament was to be the same as the turtleback torpedo boat destroyers that preceded her. In 1906 the Admiralty decided to upgrade the armament by landing the five QF 6-pounder (8 cwt) guns and shipping three QF 12-pounder 8 cwt guns. Two would be mounted abeam at the forecastle break and the third gun would be mounted on the quarterdeck.

== Pre-war ==
After commissioning she was assigned to the China Station in late 1904. In September 1905 Exe under the command of Commander Alan Everett, while accompanying HMS Dee encountered a severe typhoon between Wei-hai-wei and Shanghai. Both ships weathered the storm and proved the seaworthiness of the River class design.

On 30 August 1912 the Admiralty directed all destroyer classes were to be designated by alpha characters starting with the letter 'A'. The ships of the River class were assigned to the E class. After 30 September 1913, she was known as an E-class destroyer and had the letter ‘E’ painted on the hull below the bridge area and on either the fore or aft funnel.

In September 1912 Exe completed a refit at Sheerness Dockyard and rejoined the Fifth Flotilla. In March 1913, Exe formed part of the Ninth Flotilla based at Chatham, one of four Flotillas equipped with old destroyers and torpedo boats for patrol purposes.

== World War I ==
Upon her return to Home Waters 1914 she was in the 9th Destroyer Flotilla based at Chatham tendered to HMS St George. The 9th Flotilla was a patrol flotilla tasked with anti-submarine and counter mining patrols in the Firth of Forth area. Soon after the commencement of hostilities she was deployed to the Scapa Flow Local Flotilla under the command of the Commander-in-Chief Home Fleet tendered to HMS King George V. Her duties here included counter-mining patrols and antisubmarine measures in defence of the Fleet anchorage.

Exe was still based at Scapa in January 1915, but in February, it was decided to base more destroyers in the English Channel to protect troop transports, and Exe was ordered to join the Sixth Flotilla, part of the Dover Patrol, leaving Scapa on 27 February and arriving at Dover on 2 March. At the end of March, she moved again, being one of eight River-class destroyers transferred to Portsmouth for escort operations, relieving the Beagle-class destroyers from their escort duties so the Beagles could be detached to the Mediterranean for use in the Dardanelles campaign.

On 15 December 1916 Exe and sister ship Cherwell were mid-English Channel, returning from escorting a convoy to Le Havre when they interrupted the German submarine UC-17, which had stopped the British steamer Red Rose. UC-17 dived on sighting the smoke from the destroyers, saving Red Rose from being sunk. Exe attempted to search for the submarine, deploying an explosive paravane, which exploded when lowered, but UC-17 was unharmed. On 27 February 1917 Exe spotted the German submarine UB-40 in the Channel. Exe attacked with explosive paravanes while the P-class patrol boat P33 attacked with depth charges, but the submarine was undamaged. On the night of 13/14 May Exe was escorting the merchant ship SS Irwell between Portsmouth and Le Havre when her commanding officer spotted a possible submarine. Exe attempted to ram the submarine, (Note: Possibly UB-36 or UB-20) which disappeared in a rain storm without being hit.

== Fate ==
In 1919 she was paid off and laid up in reserve awaiting disposal. On 10 February 1920 she was sold to Thos. W. Ward of Sheffield for breaking at Rainham, Kent, on the Thames Estuary.

== Pennant numbers ==
Pennant number	From	To
N05	6 Dec 1914	1 September 1915
D19	1 Sep 1915	1 January 1918
D33	1 Jan 1918	13 September 1918
H70	13 Sep 1918	10 February 1920

== Bibliography ==
- Chesneau, Roger & Kolesnik, Eugene M., eds. (1979). Conway's All The World's Fighting Ships 1860–1905. London: Conway Maritime Press. ISBN 0-85177-133-5.
- Colledge, J. J.; Warlow, Ben (2006) [1969]. Ships of the Royal Navy: The Complete Record of All Fighting Ships of the Royal Navy from the 15th Century to the Present (3rd Rev ed.). London: Chatham Publishing. ISBN 978-1-86176-281-8. OCLC 67375475.
- Dittmar, F.J.; Colledge, J. J. (1972). British Warships 1914–1919. Shepperton, UK: Ian Allan. ISBN 0-7110-0380-7.
- Fisher, John (2006). "Destroyers in a Typhoon". Warship International. XLIII (2): 183–193. ISSN 0043-0374.
- Friedman, Norman (2009). British Destroyers: From Earliest Days to the Second World War. Barnsley, UK: Seaforth Publishing. ISBN 978-1-84832-049-9.
- Gardiner, Robert & Gray, Randal, eds. (1985). Conway's All The World's Fighting Ships 1906–1921. London: Conway Maritime Press. ISBN 0-85177-245-5.
- Manning, T. D. (1961). The British Destroyer. London: Putnam & Co. OCLC 6470051.
- March, Edgar J. (1966). British Destroyers: A History of Development, 1892–1953; Drawn by Admiralty Permission From Official Records & Returns, Ships' Covers & Building Plans. London: Seeley Service. OCLC 164893555.
- Monograph No. 29: Home Waters—Part IV: From February to July 1915 (PDF). Naval Staff Monographs (Historical). Vol. XIII. The Naval Staff, Training and Staff Duties Division. 1925.
- Monograph No. 34: Home Waters—Part VIII: December 1916 to April 1917 (PDF). Naval Staff Monographs (Historical). Vol. XVIII. The Naval Staff, Training and Staff Duties Division. 1933.
- Monograph No. 35: Home Waters—Part IX: 1st May 1917 to 31st July 1917 (PDF). Naval Staff Monographs (Historical). Vol. XIX. The Naval Staff, Training and Staff Duties Division. 1939.
- Parkinson, Jonathan (2006). "Re: Destroyers in a Typhoon". Warship International. XLIII (4): 377–378. ISSN 0043-0374.
