= HMS Crane (1896) =

Destroyer of the Royal Navy

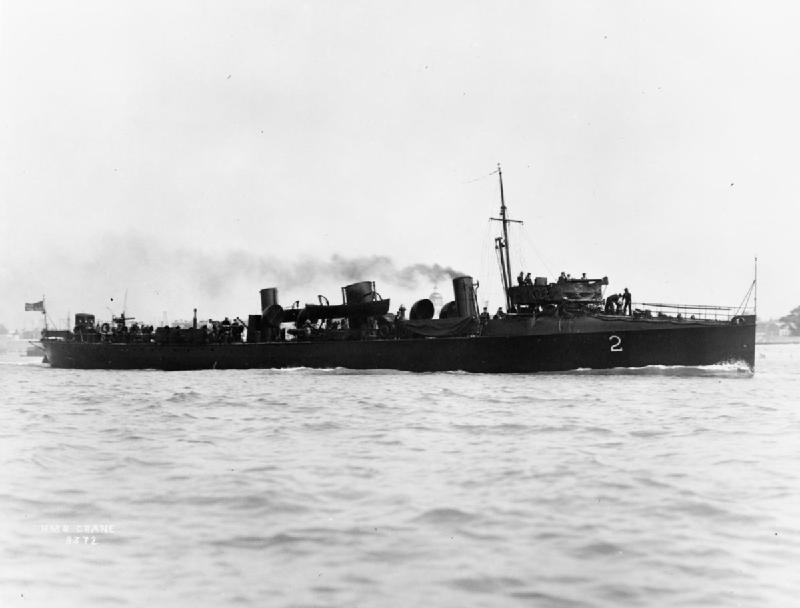
- HMS Crane

History

United Kingdom
- Name: HMS Crane
- Ordered: 1895 – 1896 Naval Estimates
- Builder: Palmers, Jarrow
- Laid down: 2 August 1896
- Launched: 17 December 1896
- Commissioned: April 1898
- Out of service: Laid up in reserve 1919
- Honours and awards: Belgian Coast 1914 - 1917
- Fate: Sold for breaking, 10 June 1919

General characteristics
- Class & type: Palmer three-funnel, 30-knot destroyer
- Displacement: 390 long tons (396 t) standard; 420 long tons (427 t) full load
- Length: 219 ft 9 in (66.98 m) o/a
- Beam: 20 ft 9 in (6.32 m)
- Draught: 8 ft 11 in (2.72 m)
- Installed power: 6,000 shp (4,500 kW)
- Propulsion: 4 × Reed water tube boilers; 2 × vertical triple-expansion steam engines; 2 shafts
- Speed: 30 kn (56 km/h)
- Range: 80 tons coal; 1,490 nmi (2,760 km) at 11 kn (20 km/h; 13 mph)
- Complement: 60 officers and men
- Armament: 1 × QF 12-pounder 12 cwt Mark I L/40 naval gun on a P Mark I low angle mount; 5 × QF 6-pdr 8 cwt L/40 naval gun on a Mark I* low angle mount; 2 × single tubes for 18-inch (450mm) torpedoes

Service record
- Operations: World War I 1914 - 1918

HMS Crane was a Palmer three-funnel, 30-knot destroyer ordered by the Royal Navy under the 1895–1896 Naval Estimates. She was the sixth ship to carry this name since it was introduced in 1590 for a 24-gun schooner in service until 1629.

== Construction ==
She was laid down on 2 August 1896 at the Palmer shipyard at Jarrow-on-Tyne and launched on 17 December 1896. During her builder's trials Crane made her contracted speed requirement. She was completed and accepted by the Royal Navy in April 1898.

== Service history ==
=== Pre-War ===
After commissioning Crane was assigned to the Devonport Flotilla, but by April 1900 she had been transferred to the Portsmouth instructional flotilla. She was under the command of Commander Michael Henry Hodges from early January 1901. On 2 September 1902 Lieutenant Arthur Kenneth Macrorie was appointed in command, when she commissioned at Portsmouth for service on the Mediterranean Station. She arrived at Malta later the same month. Returning to Home Waters in 1904, she was assigned to the East Coast Flotilla.

On 10 March 1910 Crane was moored to a buoy in Portsmouth Harbour when she was rammed by the cross-Channel ferry Princess Margaret. Crane's bows were badly damaged in the collision.

On 30 August 1912 the Admiralty directed all destroyer classes were to be designated by alpha characters starting with the letter 'A'. Since her design speed was 30 knots (56 km/h; 35 mph) and she had three funnels, she was assigned to the C class. After 30 September 1913, she was known as a C-class destroyer and had the letter ‘C’ painted on the hull below the bridge area and on either the fore or aft funnel.

=== World War I ===
In July 1914 she was in active commission in the 7th Destroyer Flotilla based at Devonport tendered to HMS Leander, destroyer depot ship to the 7th Flotilla. In September 1914 the 7th was redeployed to the Humber River. She remained in this deployment until the cessation of hostilities. Her employment within the Humber Patrol included anti-submarine and counter-mining patrols.

On 28 October 1914 under the command of Commander R. H. Coppinger, she took part in operations off the Belgian Coast.

== Disposal ==
In 1919 she was paid off and laid-up in reserve awaiting disposal. She was sold on 10 June 1919 to Thos. W. Ward of Sheffield for breaking at New Holland, Lincolnshire, on the Humber Estuary.

She was awarded the battle honour "Belgian Coast 1914 - 1917".

== Pennant numbers ==
Pennant number	From	To
P97	6 Dec 1914	1 Sep 1915
D46	1 Sep 1915	1 Jan 1918
D09	1 Jan 1918	13 Sep 1918
H87	13 Sep 1918	10 Jun 1919

== Bibliography ==
- Chesneau, Roger & Kolesnik, Eugene M., eds. (1979). Conway's All The World's Fighting Ships 1860–1905. London: Conway Maritime Press. ISBN 0-85177-133-5.
- Colledge, J. J.; Warlow, Ben (2006) [1969]. Ships of the Royal Navy: The Complete Record of All Fighting Ships of the Royal Navy from the 15th Century to the Present (3rd Rev ed.). London: Chatham Publishing. ISBN 978-1-86176-281-8. OCLC 67375475.
- Dittmar, F. J. & Colledge, J. J. (1972). British Warships 1914–1919. Shepperton, UK: Ian Allan. ISBN 0-7110-0380-7.
- Friedman, Norman (2009). British Destroyers: From Earliest Days to the Second World War. Barnsley, UK: Seaforth Publishing. ISBN 978-1-84832-049-9.
- Gardiner, Robert & Gray, Randal, eds. (1985). Conway's All The World's Fighting Ships 1906–1921. London: Conway Maritime Press. ISBN 0-85177-245-5.
- Lyon, David (2001) [1996]. The First Destroyers. London: Caxton Editions. ISBN 1-84067-3648.
- Manning, T. D. (1961). The British Destroyer. London: Putnam & Co. OCLC 6470051.
- March, Edgar J. (1966). British Destroyers: A History of Development, 1892–1953; Drawn by Admiralty Permission From Official Records & Returns, Ships' Covers & Building Plans. London: Seeley Service. OCLC 164893555.
