= HMS Porcupine (1895) =

Janus-class destroyer

History

United Kingdom
- Name: HMS Porcupine
- Ordered: 7 November 1893
- Builder: Palmers Shipbuilding and Iron Company
- Laid down: 28 March 1894
- Launched: 19 September 1895
- Fate: Sold and scrapped in 29 April 1920

General characteristics
- Class & type: Janus-class destroyer
- Displacement: 320 long tons (330 t)
- Length: 204 ft 6 in (62.33 m) oa
- Beam: 19 ft 9 in (6.02 m)
- Draught: 8 ft 0 in (2.44 m)
- Installed power: 3,900 ihp (2,900 kW)
- Propulsion: 4 × Reed boilers; 2 × vertical triple-expansion steam engines; 2 shafts
- Speed: 27 kn (50 km/h; 31 mph)
- Armament: 1 × QF 12-pounder gun; 5 × 6-pounder; 2 × 18 inch (450 mm) torpedo tubes

HMS Porcupine was a Janus-class destroyer of the Royal Navy. She was launched by Palmers Shipbuilding and Iron Company in 1895, served in home waters and was in service during the First World War.

== Design and construction ==
Three torpedo-boat destroyers were ordered on 7 November 1893 from the Jarrow shipbuilders, Palmers Shipbuilding and Iron Company for the Royal Navy as part of the 1893–1894 Naval Estimates. These three ships, Janus, Lightning and Porcupine were part of a larger group of 36 destroyers ordered as part of this shipbuilding programme, as a follow-on to the six prototype "26-knotters" ordered in the previous 1892–1893 estimates. The Admiralty laid down broad requirements for the destroyers, including a speed of 27 knots (50 km/h; 31 mph) on sea trials, with the detailed design left to the builders, resulting in each of the builders producing different designs.

Palmers' design was 204 feet 6 inches (62.33 m) long overall and 200 feet (60.96 m) between perpendiculars, with a beam of 19 feet 9 inches (6.02 m) and a draught of 8 feet 0 inches (2.44 m). Displacement was 275 long tons (279 t) light and 320 long tons (330 t) full load. Four Reed water tube boilers fed steam at 250 pounds per square inch (1,700 kPa) to two triple expansion steam engines rated at 3,900 indicated horsepower (2,900 kW) and driving two propeller shafts. Three funnels were fitted. Armament consisted of a single QF 12 pounder 12 cwt (Note: "Cwt" is the abbreviation for hundredweight, 12cwt referring to the weight of the gun.) gun and three 6-pounder guns, with two 18 inch (450 mm) torpedo tubes. One of the torpedo tubes could be removed to accommodate a further two six-pounders, although the Palmer 27-knotters later carried both the two torpedo tubes and all 5 six-pounder guns.

Porcupine, together with the other two Palmer-built destroyers, was laid down on 28 March 1894. She was launched on 19 September 1895. Porcupine reached a speed of 27.91 knots (51.69 km/h; 32.12 mph) during sea trials, exceeding the required 27 knots. She was completed in March 1896.

== Service history ==
In 1896 Porcupine was in reserve at Chatham. She took part in the 1896 British Naval Manoeuvres, attached to the Channel Fleet operation from Milford Haven. Porcupine undertook a refit at Chatham in late 1899, and was passed into the Fleet Reserve 15 January 1900. The following month she succeeded HMS Cygnet as part of the Medway Instructional Flotilla, taking the latter ship's crew, including Commander Cecil Hickley in command. Lieutenant George Geoffrey Codrington was appointed in command in January 1902, and she paid off at Chatham on 31 July 1902, following which she had her boilers retubed. She took part in the fleet review held at Spithead on 16 August 1902 for the coronation of King Edward VII. In 1910, Porcupine was part of the Sixth Destroyer Flotilla, based at The Nore, still being based at the Nore in 1912. Porcupine ran aground off Clacton on 18 October 1910. Her commanding officer was reprimanded in the resulting Court Martial. On 30 August 1912 the Admiralty directed all destroyers were to be grouped into classes designated by letters based on contract speed and appearance. After 30 September 1913, as a 27-knotter, Porcupine was assigned to the A class.

By February 1913, Porcupine was not part of an active flotilla, but was attached as a tender to the torpedo school at Chatham, with a nucleus crew, although she was in full commission by May 1913. She remained part of the torpedo school based at Chatham on the eve of the outbreak of the First World War.

Porcupine joined the Local Defence Flotilla at the Nore on the outbreak of war, and remained part of that formation for much of the rest of the war, still being a member in November 1917.

Porcupine was sold to the ship breakers Thos. W. Ward on 29 April 1920 for scrapping.

== Bibliography ==
- Brassey, T.A. (1897). The Naval Annual 1897. Portsmouth, UK: J. Griffin and Co.
- Chesneau, Roger & Kolesnik, Eugene M, eds. (1979). Conway's All The World's Fighting Ships 1860–1905. London: Conway Maritime Press. ISBN 0-85177-133-5.
- Colledge, J. J.; Warlow, Ben (2006) [1969]. Ships of the Royal Navy: The Complete Record of All Fighting Ships of the Royal Navy from the 15th Century to the Present (3rd Rev ed.). London: Chatham Publishing. ISBN 978-1-86176-281-8. OCLC 67375475.
- Dittmar, F.J.; Colledge, J.J. (1972). British Warships 1914–1919. Shepperton, UK: Ian Allan. ISBN 0-7110-0380-7.
- Friedman, Norman (2009). British Destroyers: From Earliest Days to the Second World War. Barnsley, UK: Seaforth Publishing. ISBN 978-1-84832-049-9.
- Gardiner, Robert & Gray, Randal, eds. (1985). Conway's All The World's Fighting Ships 1906–1921. London: Conway Maritime Press. ISBN 0-85177-245-5.
- Lyon, David (2001) [1996]. The First Destroyers. London: Caxton Editions. ISBN 1-84067-364-8.
- Manning, T. D. (1961). The British Destroyer. Putnam & Co. OCLC 6470051.
- March, Edgar J. (1966). British Destroyers: A History of Development, 1892–1953; Drawn by Admiralty Permission From Official Records & Returns, Ships' Covers & Building Plans. London: Seeley Service. OCLC 164893555.
