= HMS Thunder =

Ten ships of the Royal Navy have been called HMS Thunder, while an eleventh was planned but never built:

- HMS Thunder (1695) was a 5-gun bomb vessel launched in 1695. She was captured by a French privateer in 1696.
- HMS Thunder (1720) was a 6-gun bomb vessel captured from the Spanish in 1720 and broken up in 1734.
- HMS Thunder (1740) was an 8-gun bomb vessel launched in 1740. She foundered in a hurricane in 1744.
- HMS Thunder (1759) was an 8-gun bomb vessel launched in 1759 and sold in 1774. She was almost completely rebuilt in 1775 and became the mercantile vessel Hawke, of 320 tons (bm). In 1783 she was listed in Lloyd's Register with master M. Scott, owner E. Hoskins, trade London-Greenland fisheries, and armament of 4 × 9-pounder and 10 × 6-pounder guns.
- HMS Thunder was an 18-gun bomb vessel, previously HMS Racehorse (1757). She was captured by the French 64-gun Vaillant in August 1778 near Rhode Island. The French then destroyed her.
- HMS Thunder (1779) was an 8-gun bomb vessel launched in 1779. She foundered in 1781.
- HMS Thunder (1797) was an 8-gun bomb vessel, previously the Dutch Guter Erwartung. She was captured in 1797. Reportedly her crew mutinied in 1800 and took her into Bilbao. This may have been mistaken as the Royal Navy paid her off in 1801, and sold her in 1802.
- HMS Thunder (1803) was an 8-gun bomb vessel, previously the mercantile Dasher, launched at Bideford in 1800 that made two voyages as a slave ship. The Navy purchased her in 1803 and sold her in 1814.
- HMS Thunder was to have been a bomb vessel. She was ordered in 1812, but the order was later cancelled.
- HMS Thunder (1829) was a 12-gun bomb vessel launched in 1829. She was converted to a survey ship in 1833 and was broken up in 1851.
- HMS Thunder (1855) was a wooden ironclad floating battery launched in 1855 and broken up in 1874.

== Also ==
- Thunder was a gunboat that the garrison at Gibraltar launched in June 1782 during the Great Siege of Gibraltar. She was one of 12. Each was armed with an 18-pounder gun, and received a crew of 21 men drawn from Royal Navy vessels stationed at Gibraltar. Brilliant provided Thunder's crew.

== See also ==
- HMCS Thunder
- HMS Thunderer
- HMS Thunderbolt
- HMS Thunder Child
- HMS Lightning
