= HMS Lightning (1895) =

Janus-class destroyer

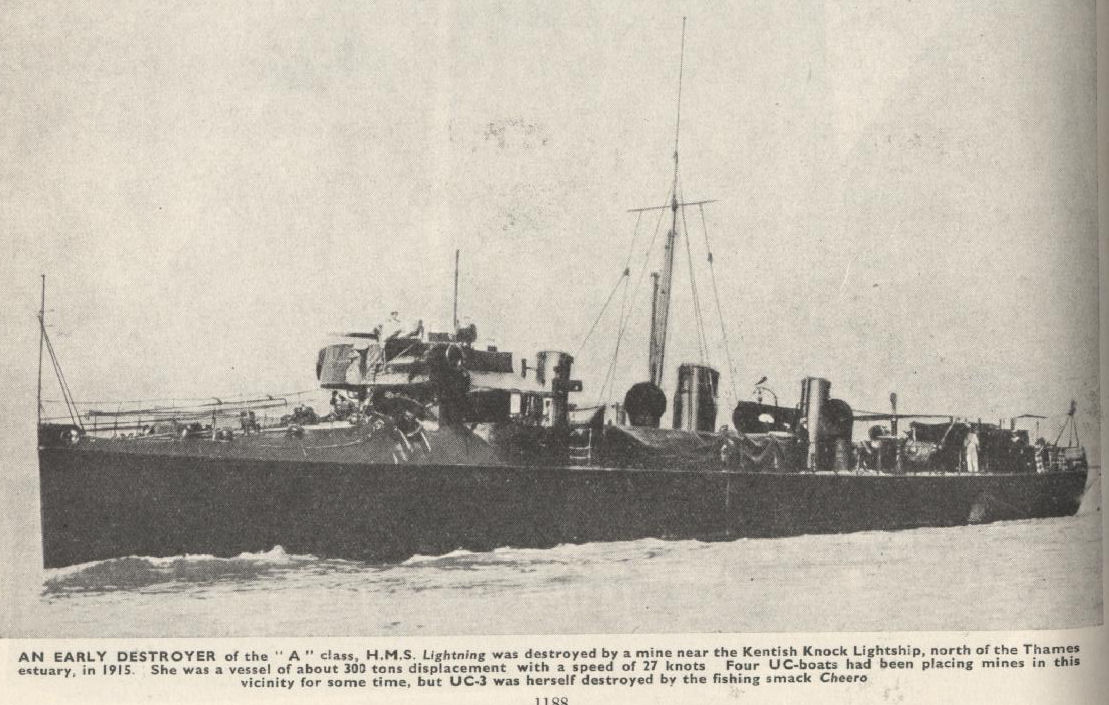
- HMS Lightning

History

United Kingdom
- Name: HMS Lightning
- Ordered: 7 November 1893
- Builder: Palmers
- Laid down: 28 March 1894
- Launched: 10 April 1895
- Completed: January 1896
- Fate: Sunk off Kentish Knock Lightship 30 June 1915 after striking mine

General characteristics
- Class & type: Janus-class destroyer
- Displacement: 320 long tons (330 t) full load
- Length: 204 ft 6 in (62.33 m) oa
- Beam: 19 ft 9 in (6.02 m)
- Draught: 8 ft 0 in (2.44 m)
- Installed power: 3,900 ihp (2,900 kW)
- Propulsion: 4 × Reed boilers; 2 × vertical triple-expansion steam engines; 2 shafts
- Speed: 27 kn (50 km/h; 31 mph)
- Armament: 1 × QF 12-pounder gun; 3 × 6-pounder; 2 × 18 inch (450 mm) torpedo tubes

HMS Lightning was a Janus-class destroyer of the British Royal Navy, later designated an A-class destroyer, built by Palmers and launched in 1895.

== Design and construction ==
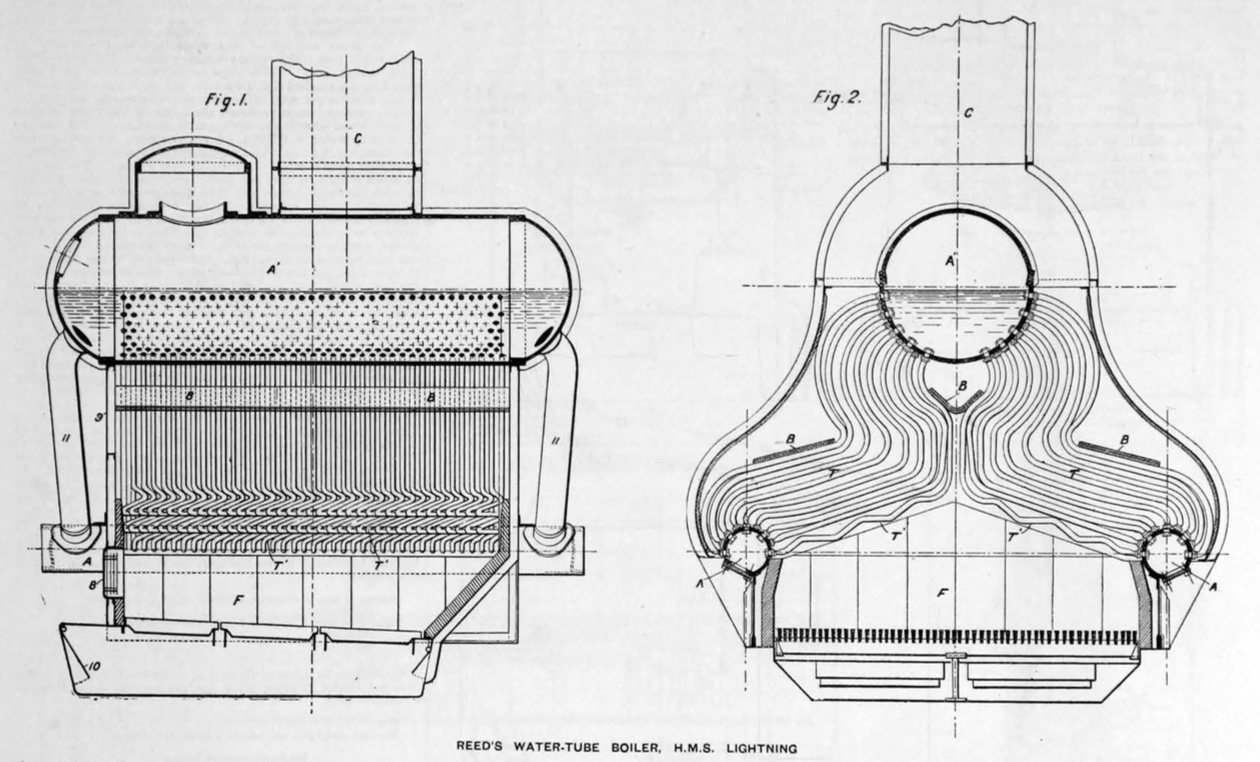
Reed water tube boiler cross sections

Three torpedo-boat destroyers were ordered on 7 November 1893 from the Jarrow shipbuilders, Palmers Shipbuilding and Iron Company for the Royal Navy as part of the 1893–1894 Naval Estimates. These three ships, Janus, Lightning and Porcupine were part of a larger group of 36 destroyers ordered as part of this shipbuilding programme, as a follow-on to the six prototype "26-knotters" ordered in the previous 1892–1893 Estimates. The Admiralty laid down broad requirements for the destroyers, including a speed of 27 knots (50 km/h; 31 mph) on sea trials, with the detailed design left to the builders, resulting in each of the builders producing different designs.

Palmers' design was 204 feet 6 inches (62.33 m) long overall and 200 feet (60.96 m) between perpendiculars, with a beam of 19 feet 9 inches (6.02 m) and a draught of 8 feet 0 inches (2.44 m). Displacement was 275 long tons (279 t) light and 320 long tons (330 t) full load. Four Reed water tube boilers fed steam at 250 pounds per square inch (1,700 kPa) to two triple expansion steam engines rated at 3,900 indicated horsepower (2,900 kW) and driving two propeller shafts. Three funnels were fitted. Armament consisted of a single QF 12 pounder 12 cwt (Note: "Cwt" is the abbreviation for hundredweight, 12cwt referring to the weight of the gun.) gun and three 6-pounder guns, with two 18 inch (450 mm) torpedo tubes. One of the torpedo tubes could be removed to accommodate a further two six-pounders, although the Palmer 27-knotters later carried both the two torpedo tubes and all 5 six-pounder guns.

Lightning, together with the other two Palmer-built destroyers, was laid down on 28 March 1894, and was launched on 10 April 1895. Lightning exceeded the required 27 knots, reaching an average of 27.94 knots (51.74 km/h; 32.15 mph) during sea trials on 5 November 1895. She collided with the collier Belvedere on 8 November when returning to port from these trials, damaging her bows, and then ran aground on the Maplin Sands. Staff Commander Bullmore, in command of the ship during the trials, was found guilty of hazarding the ship by negligence and being drunk when on board Lightning in the resultant court martial. He was severely reprimanded and lost five years seniority. Despite these mishaps Lightning completed in January 1896.

== Service ==
The Palmer-built ships were considered the best of the 27-knotters, and at one stage, both Lightning and Janus were selected for service in distant overseas stations, although in the end, only Janus was sent to the China station, with Lightning serving her whole career in home waters.

Lightning took part in the 1896 British Naval Manoeuvres, attached to the Channel Fleet operation from Berehaven in southern Ireland. By early 1900 she was part of the Portsmouth Instructional flotilla, and later that year she was based at HMNB Portsmouth as a tender to Excellent. She underwent repairs to re-tube her boilers in 1902, and was commissioned by Lieutenant Rowland Henry Bather on 1 August 1902. She again had her boilers retubed at Sheerness in 1907, after which she returned to Portsmouth. On 17 February 1908 Lightning rammed a mooring buoy in Portsmouth harbour, holing her bow.

In 1910, Lightning was part of the Sixth Destroyer Flotilla, based at The Nore, still being based at the Nore in 1912. On 25 April 1912 Lightning collided with the torpedo boat TB 17 in Stangate Creek. Both ships were damaged, and required docking for repair, with Lightning's bow damaged and TB 17 holed below the waterline.

On 30 August 1912 the Admiralty directed all destroyers were to be grouped into classes designated by letters based on contract speed and appearance. After 30 September 1913, as a 27-knotter, Lightning was assigned to the A class.

Lightning, assigned the pennant number N.23, was allocated to the Nore Local Defence Flotilla by January 1915. On 30 June 1915, following the sighting of floating mines near the Kentish Knock Lightvessel, Lightning and the destroyer Vulture were sent out to deal with the mines. The two ships had destroyed three mines before Lightning struck another mine, lain by the German submarine UC-1, killing 15 of her crew. Lightning broke in half, the bow section sinking, while the stern was towed back to Sheerness and later scrapped. The ship's captain was absolved of any blame but was advised that he "might have considered he was in a mine field having already sighted three mines".

== Notes ==
=== Bibliography ===
- Brassey, T.A. (1897). The Naval Annual 1897. Portsmouth, UK: J. Griffin and Co.
- Chesneau, Roger & Kolesnik, Eugene M., eds. (1979). Conway's All The World's Fighting Ships 1860–1905. London: Conway Maritime Press. ISBN 0-85177-133-5.
- Colledge, J. J.; Warlow, Ben (2006) [1969]. Ships of the Royal Navy: The Complete Record of All Fighting Ships of the Royal Navy from the 15th Century to the Present (3rd Rev ed.). London: Chatham Publishing. ISBN 978-1-86176-281-8. OCLC 67375475.
- Dittmar, F.J.; Colledge, J.J. (1972). British Warships 1914–1919. Shepperton, UK: Ian Allan. ISBN 0-7110-0380-7.
- Lyon, David (2001) [1996]. The First Destroyers. London: Caxton Editions. ISBN 1-84067-364-8.
- Manning, T. D. (1961). The British Destroyer. Putnam & Co. OCLC 6470051.
- March, Edgar J. (1966). British Destroyers: A History of Development, 1892–1953; Drawn by Admiralty Permission From Official Records & Returns, Ships' Covers & Building Plans. London: Seeley Service. OCLC 164893555.
