= HMS Thunderer =

Five major warships and one shore establishment of the Royal Navy have been named HMS Thunderer :

- HMS Thunderer (1760) was a 74-gun third-rate launched in 1760. Battle honour: 'Achille 1761'. She was wrecked in 1780.
- HMS Thunderer (1783) was a 74-gun third-rate launched in 1783; Battle honours: First of June 1794, St. Lucia 1796 and Trafalgar 1805. Broken up 1814.
- HMS Thunderer (1831) was an 84-gun second-rate launched in 1831, which fought in Syria 1840. She was used as a target from 1863, was renamed HMS Nettle in 1870, and was finally sold in 1901.
- HMS Thunderer (1872) was a Devastation-class ironclad - the world's first mastless battleships - launched in 1872 and sold in 1909
- HMS Thunderer (1911) was an Orion-class battleship launched in 1911, which fought at Jutland 1916, and was broken up in 1927.
- HMS Thunderer was the name given to the Royal Naval Engineering College, located at Keyham, and later Manadon. The college was founded in 1880, later commissioned as HMS Thunderer in 1946, and finally paid off in 1995. The land at Manadon is now the site of a housing development.

Additional minor war vessel, and cancelled uses of the name:

- HMS Thunderer (1776) was a 14-gun ketch-rigged 'Radeau' gun-raft, which was awarded the Battle Honour Lake Champlain 1776, but was lost the following year.
- HMS Thunderer (1818) was to have been a 74-gun third-rate, but she was renamed HMS Talavera in 1817, prior to her launch in 1818
- HMS Thunderer (1939) was to have been a Lion-class battleship. She was ordered in 1939, but work was suspended in 1942, and she was finally cancelled in 1944

== See also ==
- HMS Thunder
