= Janus-class destroyer =

Subclass of the A-class destroyers

Class overview
- Name: Janus class
- Builders: Palmers Shipbuilding and Iron Company, Jarrow
- Operators: Royal Navy
- Preceded by: Hardy class
- Succeeded by: Salmon class
- Built: 1895
- In commission: 1895–1920
- Completed: 3
- Lost: 1
- Retired: 2

General characteristics
- Type: Torpedo Boat Destroyer
- Displacement: 275 long tons (279 t)
- Length: 204 ft 6 in (62.33 m) overall, 200 ft (61 m) pp
- Beam: 19 feet 9 inches (6.02 m)
- Draught: 8 feet (2.4 m)
- Propulsion: Reed boilers, 3,900 hp (2,908 kW)
- Speed: 27 knots (50 km/h; 31 mph)

Three Janus-class torpedo-boat destroyers (TBDs) served with the Royal Navy. Janus, Lightning and Porcupine were ordered under the 1893-94 Programme, all laid down on 28 March 1894 at Palmer's shipyard at Jarrow and launched during 1895. They displaced 275 tons (light), were 204 feet 6 inches (62.33 m) long and produced 3,900 hp (2,900 kW) from their Reed water tube boilers which gave them a top speed of 27 knots (50 km/h; 31 mph).

Under the 1893–1894 Naval Estimates, the British Admiralty placed orders for 36 torpedo-boat destroyers, all to be capable of 27 knots (50 km/h; 31 mph), the "27-knotters", as a follow-on to the six prototype "26-knotters" ordered in the previous 1892–1893 Estimates. As was typical for torpedo craft at the time, the Admiralty left detailed design to the builders, laying down only broad requirements.

In September 1913 the Admiralty re-classed all the remaining 27-knotter destroyers, including all three Janus-class vessels, as A Class destroyers.

== Bibliography ==
- Chesneau, Roger & Kolesnik, Eugene M., eds. (1979). Conway's All The World's Fighting Ships 1860–1905. London: Conway Maritime Press. ISBN 0-85177-133-5.
- Colledge, J. J.; Warlow, Ben (2006) [1969]. Ships of the Royal Navy: The Complete Record of All Fighting Ships of the Royal Navy from the 15th Century to the Present (3rd Rev ed.). London: Chatham Publishing. ISBN 978-1-86176-281-8. OCLC 67375475.
- Friedman, Norman (2009). British Destroyers: From Earliest Days to the Second World War. Barnsley, UK: Seaforth Publishing. ISBN 978-1-84832-049-9.
- Gardiner, Robert & Gray, Randal, eds. (1985). Conway's All The World's Fighting Ships 1906–1921. London: Conway Maritime Press. ISBN 0-85177-245-5.
- Lyon, David (2001) [1996]. The First Destroyers. London: Caxton Editions. ISBN 1-84067-364-8.
- Manning, T. D. (1961). The British Destroyer. Putnam & Co. OCLC 6470051.
- March, Edgar J. (1966). British Destroyers: A History of Development, 1892–1953; Drawn by Admiralty Permission From Official Records & Returns, Ships' Covers & Building Plans. London: Seeley Service. OCLC 164893555.
