= John Bowes (steamship) =

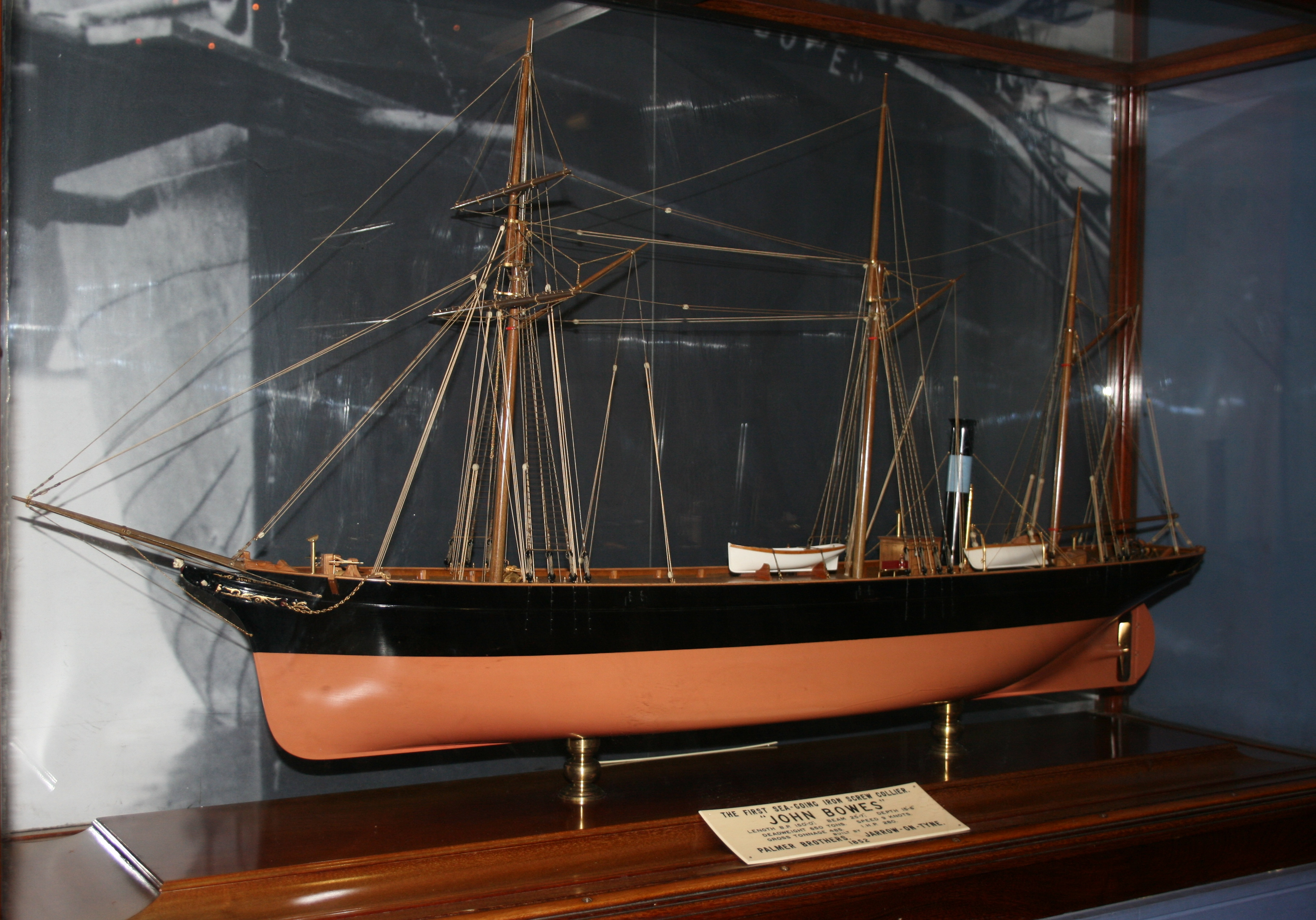
- Model of John Bowes at the Tyne & Wear Archives and Museum.

History

United Kingdom
- Name: John Bowes
- Owner: Charles Mark Palmer, Newcastle
- Port of registry: United Kingdom
- Builder: Palmer Brothers & Co, Jarrow
- Yard number: 2
- Launched: 30 June 1852
- Christened: 30 June 1852
- Completed: 22 July 1852
- Maiden voyage: 27 July 1852
- Out of service: 12 October 1933
- Refit: 1853(?), 1864 and 1883
- Homeport: Newcastle
- Identification: Official number 26276
- Fate: Foundered
- Notes: First screw collier built on the River Tyne.

General characteristics
- Type: Iron hulled steam screw & sail collier
- Tonnage: 437 GRT
- Length: 149.0 ft (45.4 m)
- Beam: 25.7 ft (7.8 m)
- Depth of hold: 15.6 ft (4.8 m)
- Propulsion: Steam, two cylinder by Robert Stephenson
- Sail plan: Topsail schooner
- Speed: 9 knots (17 km/h; 10 mph)

John Bowes, built on the River Tyne in England in 1852, was one of the first steam colliers. She traded for over 81 years before sinking in a storm off Spain.

== Development ==
The John Bowes was the first purpose-built steam collier, although the steamship Bedlington of 1841 carried coal before she did, but the Bedlington carried it in railway wagons as a railway ferry, not as a collier.

Charles Mark Palmer was responsible for the design of the John Bowes which was just the second vessel of over a thousand ships eventually built by the Jarrow shipyard which he had founded with his brother George.

The vessel's novel features included an iron hull, the use of water ballast, and steam propulsion with a screw propeller. As was still common, an auxiliary sailing rig was also fitted.

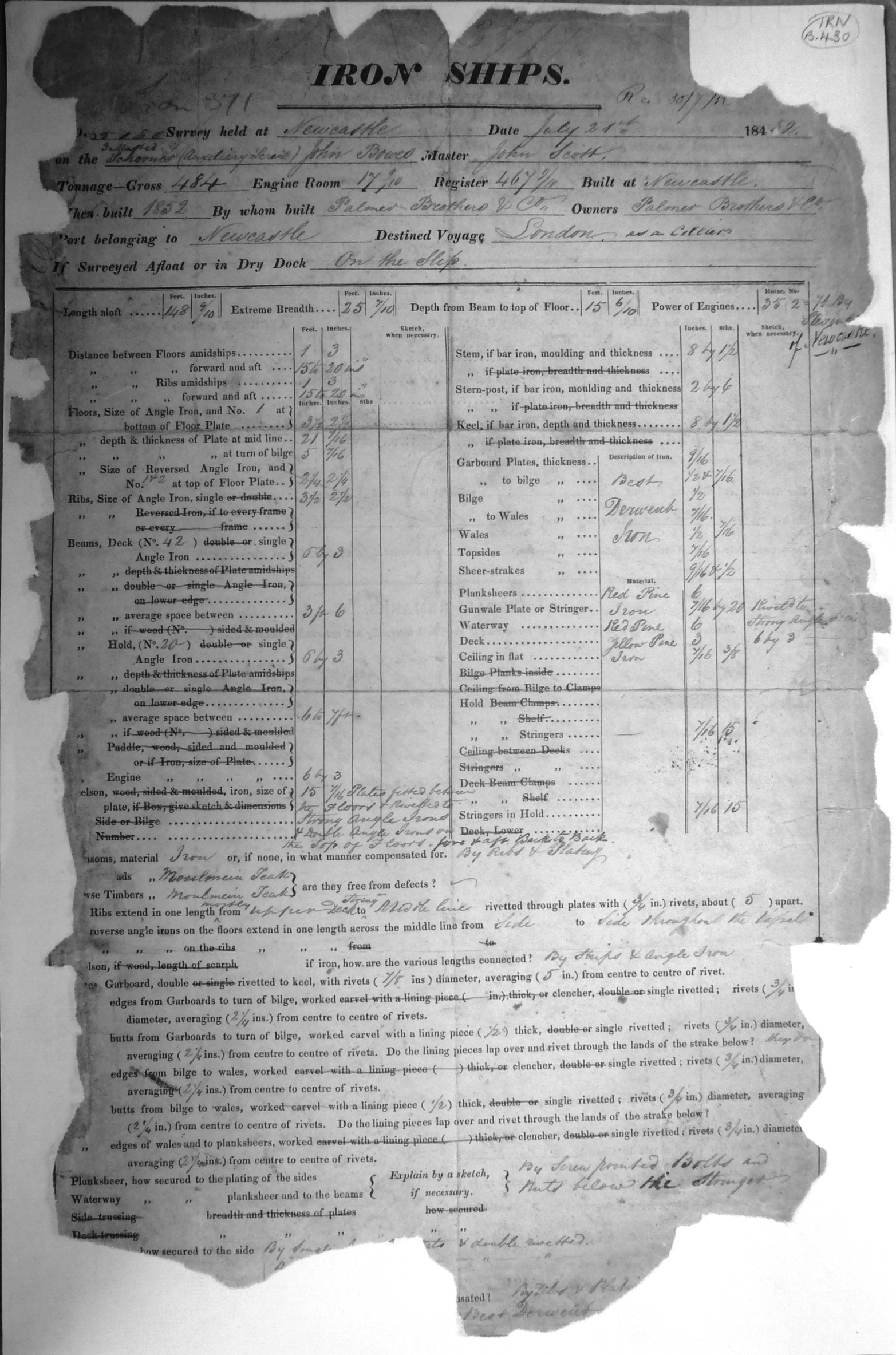
Front of 1852 Lloyd's survey certificate for steam collier SS John Bowes.

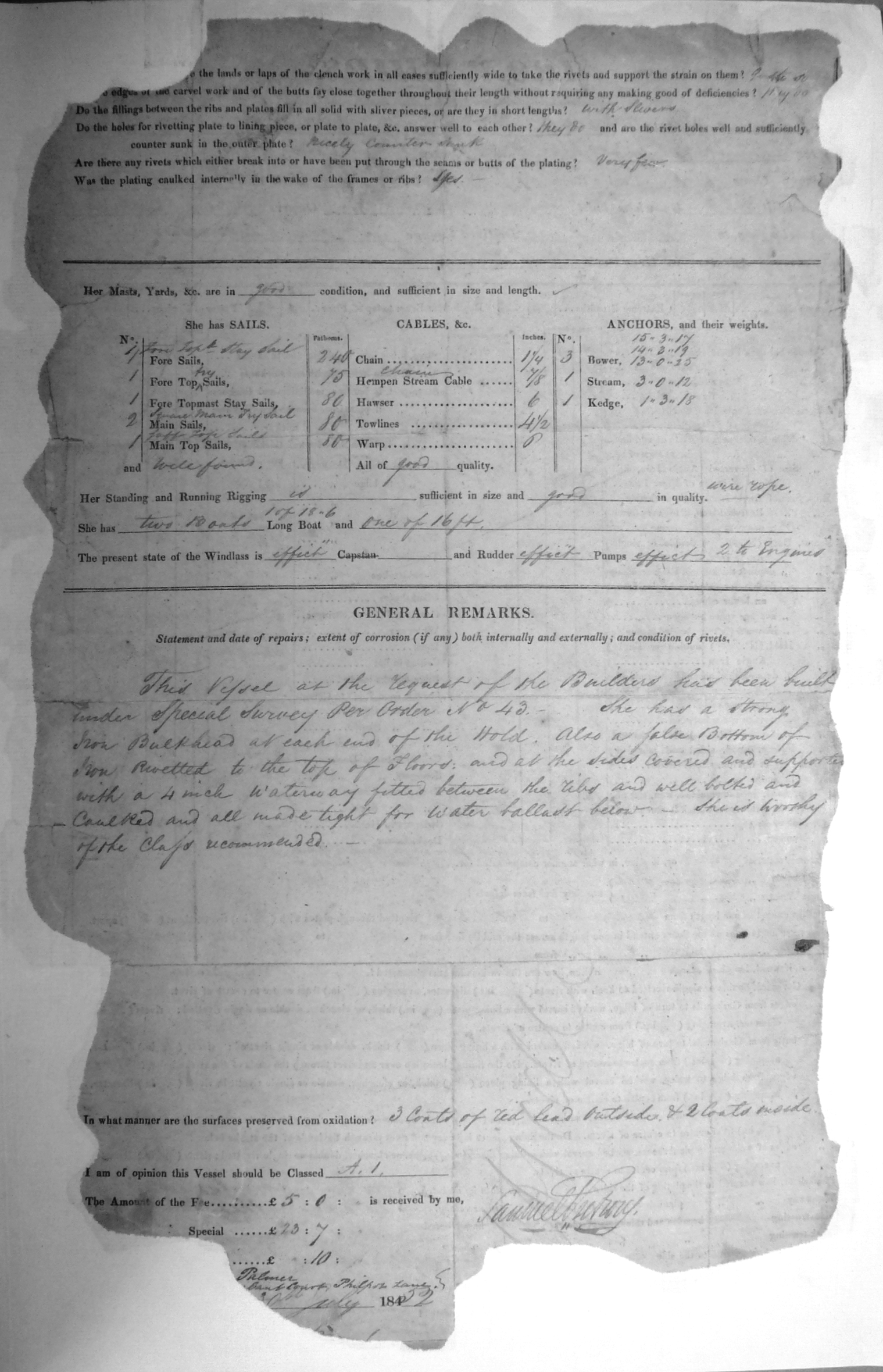
Rear of 1852 Lloyd's survey certificate for steam collier SS John Bowes.

== Career ==
The steamer was launched on 30 June 1852 and named for John Bowes, a mine owner, business partner of Charles Palmer and the then High Sheriff of Durham. Her steam engine was built by Messrs. R. Stephenson & Co., Newcastle upon Tyne. Commercial service began on 27 July 1852, with coal from the Tyne to London. Within the week, it had moved more coal than two collier brigs could have moved in a month and its success resulted in the construction of many similar ships.

The ballast tanks could not initially be kept watertight, and Palmer tried a number of solutions before settling on longitudinal iron tanks beneath each hold as proposed by John McIntyre, the Jarrow shipyard manager. During a voyage from Rosedale, Yorkshire to the River Tyne on 16 July 1860, she was run aground on the Insand, off the coast of County Durham on the North Sea.

Despite the mishap, a long and prosperous career followed. New engines were installed in 1864 and 1883 as the technology improved.

A second grounding happened on the Heligoland on 9 June 1864, and although refloated, had to be beached for repairs before continuing to Hamburg. In 1873, John Bowes was sold to Benjamin Barnett and registered at London, and in 1896, to James Mackenzie ('John Bowes' Steamship Co Ltd) of Dublin. In 1898, it was sold to Scandinavian owners as Spec and later Transit. In 1908, she was sold on to Spain, where she traded for a further twenty five years as the Carolina, Valentin Fierro and finally as the Villa Selgas.

== Loss ==
While carrying a cargo of iron ore from Bilbao to San Esteban de Pravia, Villa Selgas, now owned by Federico Fierro of San Sebastián, encountered a storm in the Bay of Biscay, began taking on water, and foundered off Ribadesella, on 12 October 1933. All twelve of the crew abandoned ship and were rescued by the fishing vessel Aurora.
