= HMS Stormcloud =

Royal Navy S class destroyer

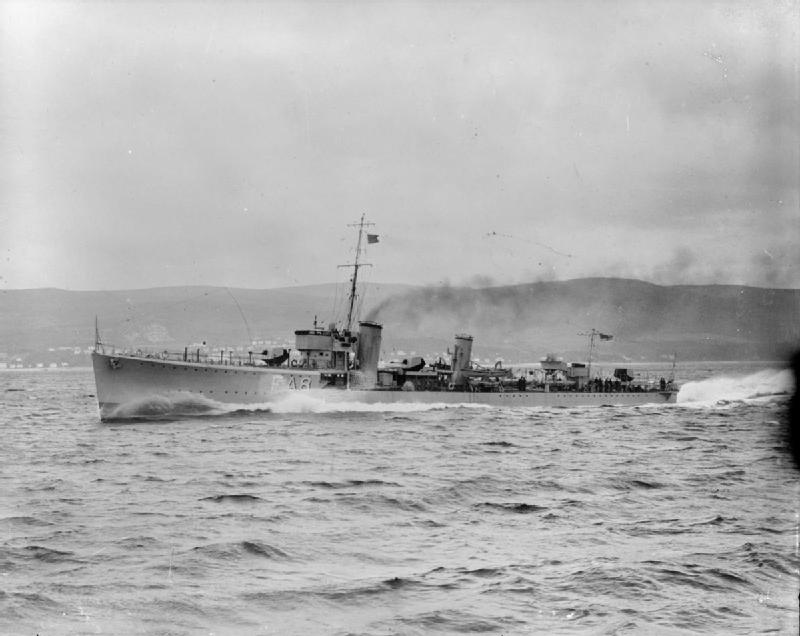
- Sister ship Stronghold

History

United Kingdom
- Name: Stormcloud
- Ordered: 7 April 1917
- Builder: Palmers, Jarrow
- Launched: 30 May 1919
- Completed: 20 January 1920
- Commissioned: 29 January 1920
- Out of service: 28 July 1934

General characteristics
- Class & type: S-class destroyer
- Displacement: 1,075 long tons (1,092 t) normal; 1,221 long tons (1,241 t) deep load
- Length: 265 ft (80.8 m) p.p.
- Beam: 26 ft 8 in (8.13 m)
- Draught: 9 ft 10 in (3.00 m) mean
- Propulsion: 3 Yarrow boilers; 2 geared Parsons steam turbines, 27,000 shp
- Speed: 36 knots (41.4 mph; 66.7 km/h)
- Range: 2,750 nmi (5,090 km) at 15 kn (28 km/h)
- Complement: 90
- Armament: 3 × single QF 4 in (102 mm) guns; 1 × single 2-pdr 40 mm (2 in) Mk. II AA gun; 2 × twin 21 in (533 mm) torpedo tubes; 4 × depth charge chutes

HMS Stormcloud was an Admiralty S-class destroyer that served with the Royal Navy during the twentieth century. The S class was a development of the R class created during the First World War as a cheaper alternative to the V and W class. Launched after Armistice that ended the war, the ship was commissioned in 1920 and initially joined the Fourth Destroyer Flotilla before moving to the Eighth Destroyer Flotilla in 1925. In 1927, the ship moved to Hong Kong and served to prevent piracy in the seas between Hong Kong and Saigon and also to rescue those who had suffered from pirates attacking their ships. Following the signing of the London Naval Treaty, the destroyer was retired and, in 1934, sold to be broken up.

== Design and development ==
Stormcloud was one of 33 Admiralty S-class destroyers ordered by the British Admiralty on 7 April 1917 as part of the Eleventh War Construction Programme. The design was a development of the R class introduced at the same time as, and as a cheaper and faster alternative to, the V and W class. Differences with the R class were minor, such as having the searchlight moved aft and being designed to mount an additional pair of torpedo tubes.

The destroyer had a overall length of 276 ft (84 m) and a length of 265 ft (81 m) between perpendiculars. Beam was 26 ft 8 in (8.13 m) and mean draught 9 ft 10 in (3.00 m). Displacement was 1,075 long tons (1,092 t) normal and 1,221 long tons (1,241 t) deep load. Three Yarrow boilers fed steam to two sets of Parsons geared steam turbines rated at 27,000 shaft horsepower (20,000 kW) and driving two shafts, giving a design speed of 36 knots (67 km/h; 41 mph) at normal loading and 32.5 knots (60.2 km/h; 37.4 mph) at deep load. Two funnels were fitted. A full load of 301 long tons (306 t) of fuel oil was carried, which gave a design range of 2,750 nautical miles (5,090 km; 3,160 mi) at 15 knots (28 km/h; 17 mph). The ship had a complement of 90 officers and ratings.

Armament consisted of three QF 4 in (102 mm) Mk IV guns on the ship's centreline. One was mounted raised on the forecastle, one on a platform between the funnels, and one aft. The destroyer mounted a single 2-pounder 40 mm (1.6 in) "pom-pom" anti-aircraft gun for air defence. Four 21 in (533 mm) torpedo tubes were carried in two twin rotating mounts aft. Four depth charge chutes were also fitted aft. Initially, typically ten depth charges were carried. The ship was designed to mount two additional 18 in (457 mm) torpedo tubes either side of the superstructure but this required the forecastle plating to be cut away, causing excess water to come aboard at sea, so they were not carried. The weight saved enabled the heavier Mark V 21-inch torpedo to be carried. Fire control included a training-only director, single Dumaresq and a Vickers range clock.

== Construction and career ==
Laid down during the First World War by Palmers at their dockyard in Jarrow, Stormcloud, the first Royal Navy ship to be given the name, was launched on 30 May 1919 after the Armistice of 11 November 1918 that ended the war. The vessel was re-commissioned on 20 January 1920 with the crew of the R-class destroyer Retriever. Stormcloud joined the Fourth Destroyer Flotilla of the Atlantic Fleet based at Port Edgar, replacing Retriever. On 15 January 1925, the destroyer joined the Eighth Destroyer Flotilla, based at Rosyth. The destroyer, along with the rest of the flotilla, departed from their temporary base at Fort Edgar on a cruise of the east coast of Scotland on 15 January 1926, returning on 12 February.

On 7 January the following year, the destroyer was brought back to full complement ready for service. The destroyer joined the rest of the flotilla in being assigned to the Commander-in-Chief, China, and was transferred to Hong Kong. The ship served against pirates operating in the area. On 19 October, Stormcloud was involved in rescuing the survivors of the merchant ship Irene, sunk by pirates in Bias Bay. A similar rescue was afforded to the over 1,500 passengers of the Javanese liner Tjileiboet, which was wrecked on Lingding Island, one of the Wanshan Archipelago. On 7 September 1931, the destroyer prevented piracy of the Norwegian steamer Helikon, which was travelling from Hong Kong to Saigon when "suspicious movements on board the latter vessel attracted notice from the warship, it being observed that two sacks were dumped overboard." The incident ended without casualties.

Meanwhile, on 22 April 1930, the United Kingdom had signed the London Naval Treaty, which limited the total destroyer tonnage that the navy could operate. As the force was looking to introduce more modern destroyers, some of the older vessels needed to be retired. The S class was deemed out of date and ripe to be replaced with more modern ships. Stormcloud returned to the United Kingdom and, on 28 July 1934, the destroyer was sold to Metal Industries of Charlestown to be broken up.

== Pennant numbers ==
Penant numbers
Pennant number	Date
D89	January 1920
H05	January 1922
