= Cecil Hickley =

Royal Navy Admiral and cricketer (1865–1941)

Admiral Cecil Hickley CB MVO
- Born: 22 January 1865
- Died: 1 May 1941 (aged 76)
- Military career
- Allegiance: United Kingdom
- Branch: Royal Navy
- Rank: Admiral
- Awards: HMS Amphitrite (1898); HMS Highflyer (1898); HMS Cochrane (1905); HMS Vanguard (1909)

Admiral Cecil Spencer Hickley, CB, MVO (22 January 1865 – 1 May 1941) was a career Royal Navy officer who finished as a vice-admiral, promoted to full admiral in retirement in 1925. He also played first-class cricket for Western Province in South Africa in 1890/91 and for Somerset in 1898 and 1899. He was born at Ashcott, Somerset and died in London.

== Naval career ==
Hickley was appointed as a lieutenant to the battleship HMS Majestic in 1895. He was promoted to the rank of commander in 1899, and was in command of the destroyer HMS Cygnet in the Medway Instructional Flotilla. In February 1900 he transferred with the crew to HMS Porcupine, which took the place in the Flotilla. He was posted to shore service at Chatham Naval barracks in August 1902. There was a further promotion from commander to captain in 1904. He took charge of the cruiser HMS Highflyer in 1906 and was listed as captain in the Royal Navy List for 1908. In 1916, he is recorded in the London Gazette as having been awarded the membership of the Royal Victorian Order (MVO) and was promoted to rear-admiral. As a rear-admiral, he was the senior naval officer in charge at the port of Harwich in 1918. In 1920, he was further promoted from rear-admiral to vice-admiral and, the next day, placed on the retired list. Later that same year, in the King's Birthday Honours, he was made a Companion of the Order of the Bath (CB). His final promotion within the retired list was to become a full admiral in 1925.

== Cricket career ==
Hickley was a right-handed middle-order batsman who had a long career in amateur cricket, though very little of it was at first-class level. He played in two matches for Western Province in the 1890/91 season and in one of them, against Eastern Province, he made 45, which was the highest score of his first-class career. He played in minor matches for both Western Province and Cape Colony against Walter Read's cricket team the following season, and against a similar touring side in India, led by Lord Hawke in 1893–94.

His only other first-class cricket came in five matches in 1898 and 1899 for Somerset, when he was not successful, his highest score and his only voyages into double figures as a batsman in county cricket being scores of 32 and 13 in the game against Hampshire in 1898. He played less important cricket for amateur teams such as the "Gentlemen of the Marylebone Cricket Club" across the early years of the 20th century, and as late as 1930, when he was 65, he played for MCC against the Lords and Commons cricket team.
