= HMS Dee (1903) =

Destroyer of the Royal Navy

History

United Kingdom
- Name: Dee
- Ordered: 1901 – 1902 Naval Estimates
- Builder: Palmers Shipbuilding and Iron Company, Jarrow
- Laid down: 5 March 1902
- Launched: 10 September 1903
- Commissioned: May 1904
- Out of service: In 1919 she was laid up in reserve awaiting disposal
- Fate: 23 July 1919 sold to Thos W. Ward of Sheffield for breaking at Briton Ferry, Glamorgan in Wales

General characteristics
- Class & type: Palmer Type River Class destroyer
- Displacement: 550 long tons (559 t) standard; 620 long tons (630 t) full load; 223 ft 6 in (68.12 m) o/a; 23 ft 6 in (7.16 m) Beam; 7 ft 4.5 in (2.248 m) Draught
- Propulsion: 4 × Reed water tube boilers; 2 × Vertical Triple Expansion (VTE) steam engines driving 2 shafts producing 7,000 shp (5,200 kW) (average)
- Speed: 25.5 kn (47.2 km/h)
- Range: 140 tons coal; 1,620 nmi (3,000 km) at 11 kn (20 km/h)
- Complement: 70 officers and men
- Armament: 1 × QF 12-pounder 12 cwt Mark I, mounting P Mark I; 3 × QF 12-pounder 8 cwt, mounting G Mark I (Added in 1906); 5 × QF 6-pounder 8 cwt (removed in 1906); 2 × single tubes for 18-inch (450mm) torpedoes

Service record
- Part of: China Station – 1905; Assigned E Class – Aug 1912 – Oct 1913; 9th Destroyer Flotilla – 1914; 7th Destroyer Flotilla – Aug 1915
- Operations: World War I 1914 - 1918

HMS Dee was a Palmer Type River Class Destroyer ordered by the Royal Navy under the 1901–1902 Naval Estimates. Named after the River Dee near Liverpool, England, she was the fourth ship to carry this name since it was introduced in 1814 for a 20-gun 6th rate sold in 1819.

== Construction ==
She was laid down on 5 March 1902 at the Palmer’s shipyard at Jarrow and launched on 10 September 1903. She was completed in May 1904. Her original armament was to be the same as the Turleback torpedo boat destroyers that preceded her. In 1906 the Admiralty decided to upgrade the armament by landing the five 6-pounder naval guns and shipping three 12-pounder 8 hundredweight (cwt) guns. Two would be mounted abeam at the foc's'le break, and the third gun would be mounted on the quarterdeck.

== Pre-War ==
After commissioning she was assigned to China Station in late 1904.

In September 1905 HMS Dee under the command of Lieutenant Commander Harold E Sullivan, RN, while accompanying HMS Exe encountered a severe typhoon between Wei-hai-wei and Shanghai. Both ships weathered the storm and proved the seaworthiness of the River Class design.

On 30 August 1912 the Admiralty directed all destroyer classes were to be designated by alpha characters starting with the letter 'A'. The ships of the River Class were assigned to the E Class. After 30 September 1913, she was known as an E Class destroyer and had the letter ‘E’ painted on the hull below the bridge area and on either the fore or aft funnel.

== World War I ==
Upon her return to Home Waters 1914 she was in the 9th Destroyer Flotilla based at Chatham tendered to HMS St George. The 9th Flotilla was a patrol flotilla tasked with anti-submarine and countermining patrols in the Firth of Forth area. Soon after the commencement of hostilities she was deployed to the Scapa Flow Local Flotilla under the command of the Commander-in-Chief Home Fleet tendered to HMS St Vincent. Her duties here included counter mining patrols and antisubmarine measures in defence of the Fleet anchorage.

In August 1915 with the amalgamation of the 9th and 7th Flotillas she was deployed to the 7th Destroyer Flotilla based at the River Humber. She remained employed on the Humber Patrol participating in counter mining operations and anti-submarine patrols for the remainder of the war.

In January 1918 she lost a member of crew by drowning

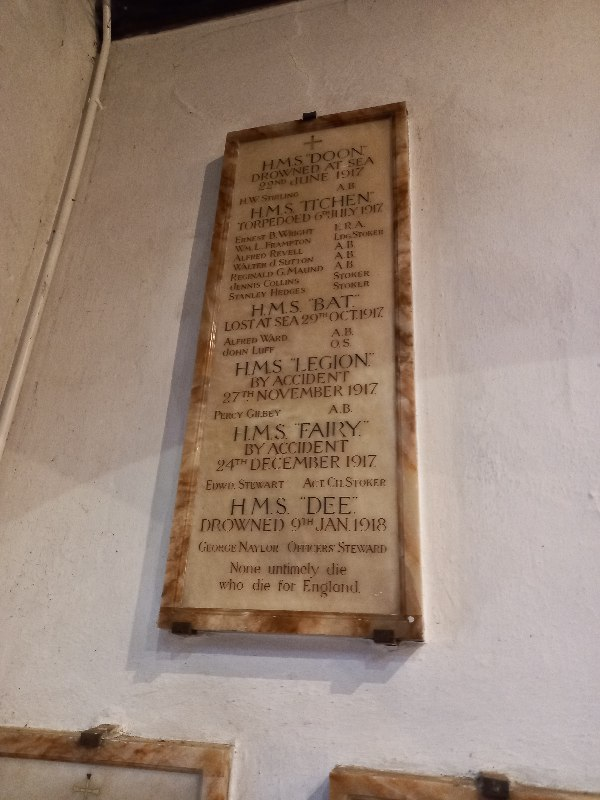
War memorial in Immingham church, commemorating the drowning of George Naylor of the Dee

== Disposal ==
In 1919 she was paid off and laid up in reserve awaiting disposal. On 23 July 1919 she was sold to Thos. W. Ward of Sheffield for breaking at Briton Ferry, Glamorgan in Wales.

She was not awarded a Battle Honour for her service.

== Pennant Numbers ==
Pennant Number	From	To
N95	6 Dec 1914	1 Sep 1915
D14	1 Sep 1915	1 Jan 1918
D24	1 Jan 1918	23 Jul 1919

== Bibliography ==
- Chesneau, Roger & Kolesnik, Eugene M., eds. (1979). Conway's All The World's Fighting Ships 1860–1905. London: Conway Maritime Press. ISBN 0-85177-133-5.
- Colledge, J. J.; Warlow, Ben (2006) [1969]. Ships of the Royal Navy: The Complete Record of All Fighting Ships of the Royal Navy from the 15th Century to the Present (3rd Rev ed.). London: Chatham Publishing. ISBN 978-1-86176-281-8. OCLC 67375475.
- Dittmar, F.J.; Colledge, J. J. (1972). British Warships 1914–1919. Shepperton, UK: Ian Allan. ISBN 0-7110-0380-7.
- Fisher, John (2006). "Destroyers in a Typhoon". Warship International. XLIII (2): 183–193. ISSN 0043-0374.
- Friedman, Norman (2009). British Destroyers: From Earliest Days to the Second World War. Barnsley, UK: Seaforth Publishing. ISBN 978-1-84832-049-9.
- Gardiner, Robert & Gray, Randal, eds. (1985). Conway's All The World's Fighting Ships 1906–1921. London: Conway Maritime Press. ISBN 0-85177-245-5.
- Manning, T. D. (1961). The British Destroyer. London: Putnam & Co. OCLC 6470051.
- March, Edgar J. (1966). British Destroyers: A History of Development, 1892–1953; Drawn by Admiralty Permission From Official Records & Returns, Ships' Covers & Building Plans. London: Seeley Service. OCLC 164893555.
