= HMS Janus (1895) =

Janus-class destroyer

History

United Kingdom
- Name: HMS Janus
- Builder: Palmers Shipbuilding and Iron Company
- Laid down: 28 March 1894
- Launched: 12 March 1895
- Completed: November 1895
- Fate: Scrapped, 1914

General characteristics
- Class & type: Janus-class destroyer
- Displacement: 385 long tons (391 t)
- Length: 204.5 ft (62.3 m)
- Beam: 19.5 ft (5.9 m)
- Draught: 8 ft (2.4 m)
- Installed power: 3,900 ihp (2,900 kW)
- Propulsion: Vertical triple-expansion steam engines; Coal-fired Reed boilers
- Speed: 27 knots (50 km/h; 31 mph)
- Armament: 1 × QF 12-pounder gun; 3 × 6-pounder guns; 3 × 18 inch (450 mm) torpedo tubes

HMS Janus was the lead ship of the Janus-class destroyers which served with the Royal Navy. She was launched by Palmers in 1895, served on the Chinese station for much of her career and was sold off in 1914.

== Service history ==
Janus was commissioned at Chatham on 27 March 1900 by Lieutenant Robert Gwynne Corbett, who was in command during her trip to the China station, where she was to serve as tender to HMS Goliath. She served on that station for most of her career.

She underwent repairs to re-tube her Reed boilers in 1902.

== Bibliography ==
- Chesneau, Roger & Kolesnik, Eugene M., eds. (1979). Conway's All The World's Fighting Ships 1860–1905. London: Conway Maritime Press. ISBN 0-85177-133-5.
- Colledge, J. J.; Warlow, Ben (2006) [1969]. Ships of the Royal Navy: The Complete Record of All Fighting Ships of the Royal Navy from the 15th Century to the Present (3rd Rev ed.). London: Chatham Publishing. ISBN 978-1-86176-281-8. OCLC 67375475.
- Friedman, Norman (2009). British Destroyers: From Earliest Days to the Second World War. Barnsley, UK: Seaforth Publishing. ISBN 978-1-84832-049-9.
- Gardiner, Robert & Gray, Randal, eds. (1985). Conway's All The World's Fighting Ships 1906–1921. London: Conway Maritime Press. ISBN 0-85177-245-5.
- Lyon, David (2001) [1996]. The First Destroyers. London: Caxton Editions. ISBN 1-84067-364-8.
- Manning, T. D. (1961). The British Destroyer. Putnam & Co. OCLC 6470051.
- March, Edgar J. (1966). British Destroyers: A History of Development, 1892–1953; Drawn by Admiralty Permission From Official Records & Returns, Ships' Covers & Building Plans. London: Seeley Service. OCLC 164893555.
