= Palmers Shipbuilding and Iron Company =

British shipbuilding company (1852–1933)

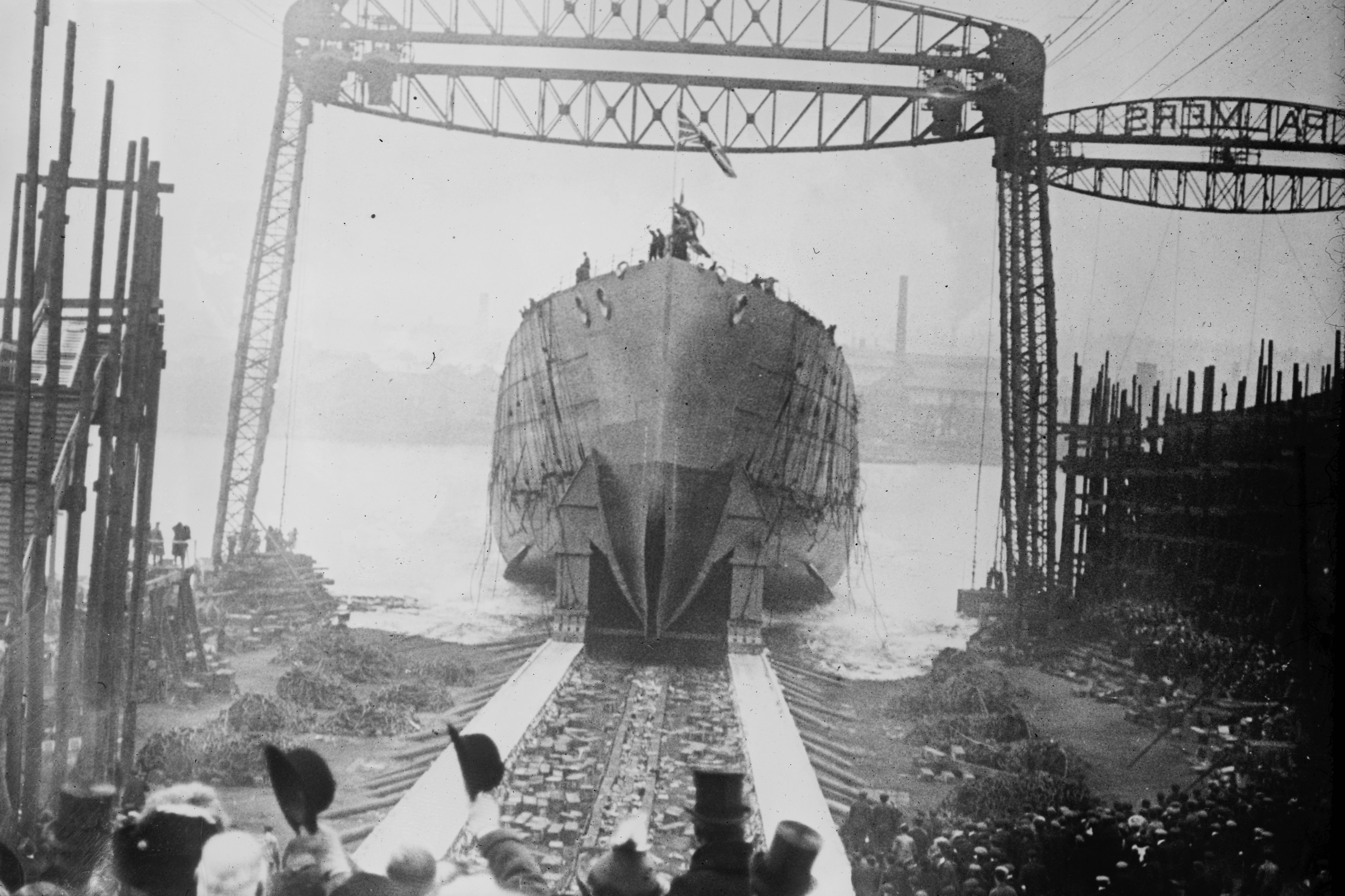
- The launch of HMS Queen Mary beneath the distinctive gantry cranes of Palmers' yard
- Type: Public
- Industry: Shipbuilding
- Founded: 1852
- Fate: Collapsed 1933
- Successor: Armstrong Whitworth
- Headquarters: Jarrow, UK

Palmers Shipbuilding and Iron Company Limited, often referred to simply as "Palmers", was a British shipbuilding company. The company was based in Jarrow, County Durham, in north-eastern England, and had operations in Hebburn and Willington Quay on the River Tyne.

== History ==
=== Early history and growth ===
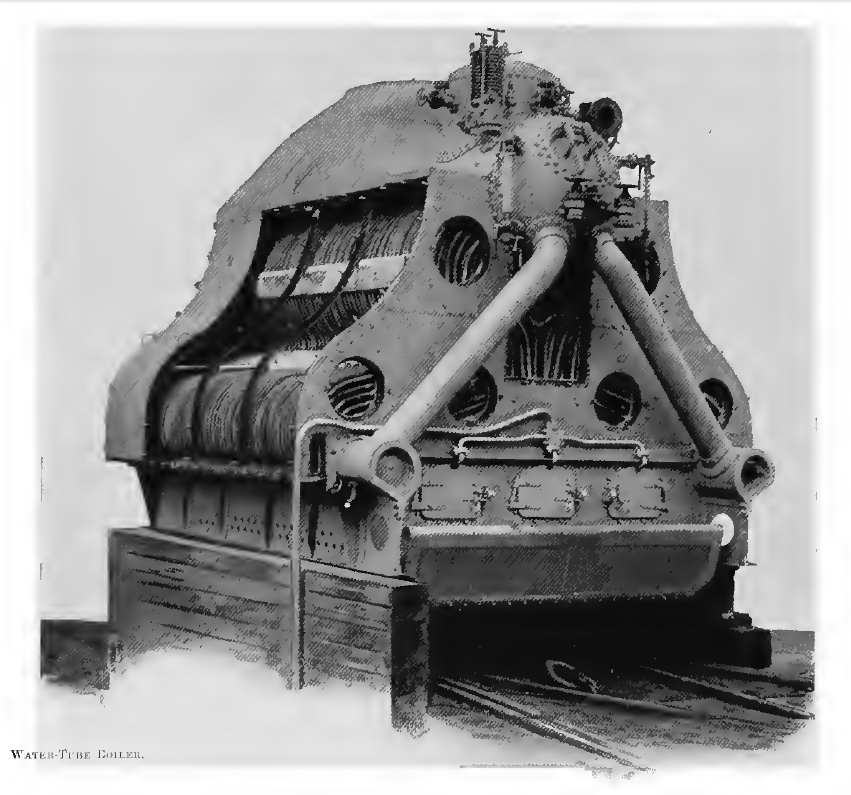
A Reed water tube boiler built by Palmers, as used in their torpedo boat destroyers

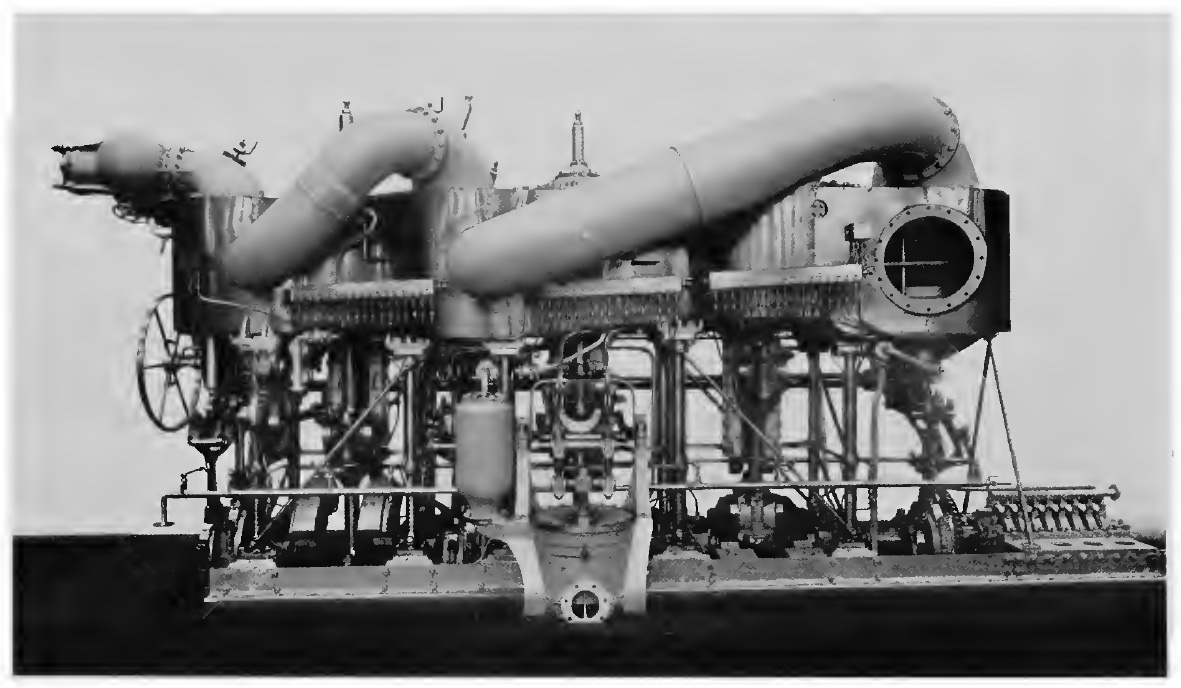
A triple expansion steam engine built in Palmers' engine works, as used in their torpedo boat destroyers

The company was established in 1852 by Charles Mark Palmer as Palmer Brothers & Co. in Jarrow. Later that year it launched the John Bowes, the first iron screw collier. By 1900, the business was known as Palmers Shipbuilding and Iron Company. (Note: Some 19th-century and later sources refer to the company as "Palmer's Shipbuilding and Iron Company", with an apostrophe, but in Some Account of the Works of Palmers Shipbuilding & Iron Company Limited, which was compiled by the business's company secretary Malcom Dillon and published in 1900, the name is given throughout as "Palmers ...", without the apostrophe.) At that time, besides building ships, it manufactured and processed its own steel and other metals, and its products included Reed water tube boilers and marine steam engines. (Note: "A speciality of [Palmers' engine works] is the manufacture of the 'Reed' water-tube boiler, the invention of Mr J. W. Reed, manager of the engine works department, which has been adopted with well-known results in ... high-speed [torpedo boat destroyers] ..., and also in vessels constructed for the Admiralty on the Clyde. It may be observed that nearly 25 miles [40 km] of tubes are used in the manufacture of the boilers and machinery of each 30-knot destroyer.")

By 1902, Palmers' base at Jarrow occupied about 100 acres (41 hectares) and included 0.75 miles (1.2 kilometres) of the southern bank of the River Tyne, and employed about 10,000 men and boys. In 1910, Sir Charles Palmer's interest in the business was acquired by Lord Furness who, as Chairman, expanded the business by acquiring a lease over a new graving dock at Hebburn from Robert Stephenson and Company. In 1919, Palmers laid down the SS Gairsoppa, which was sunk by a German U-boat in 1941, causing the loss of 84 lives and 200 long tons (203 tonnes) of silver.

=== Depression and collapse ===
The Great Depression began in 1929, all but destroying the shipbuilding industry, which did not rebound until the Second World War. In 1931, Palmers posted a loss of £88,867, equivalent to £5,234,000 in 2025. The company received a moratorium from its creditors in order to extend repayment. In January 1933, the majority of the company's unsecured creditors met in London and agreed to extend the moratorium a further six months.

Palmers was unable to survive and collapsed by the end of 1933. The company's blast furnaces and steel works—which covered 37 acres—were put up for auction. The Jarrow yard was sold to National Shipbuilders Securities, which closed it down in order to sell it, causing much unemployment and leading to the Jarrow March. After the shipyard closed, following support from the industrialist, Sir John Jarvis, the site was used the engine shop as a steel foundry for another 18 months.

The company retained the yard at Hebburn and was acquired by Armstrong Whitworth, becoming Palmers Hebburn Company. In 1973, Vickers-Armstrongs, successor to Armstrong Whitworth, sold the Palmers Dock at Hebburn to Swan Hunter and developed it as the Hebburn Shipbuilding Dock. This facility was acquired from the receivers of Swan Hunter by Tyne Tees Dockyard in 1994. They sold it to Cammell Laird in 1995. When Cammell Laird entered receivership in 2001, the dock was acquired by A&P Group. The yard remains in use as a ship repair and refurbishment facility.

== Ships built by Palmers Shipbuilding and Iron Company ==
Ships built by Palmers included:

=== Naval ===
==== Battlecruisers ====
- HMS Queen Mary Royal Navy (1912)

==== Battleships ====
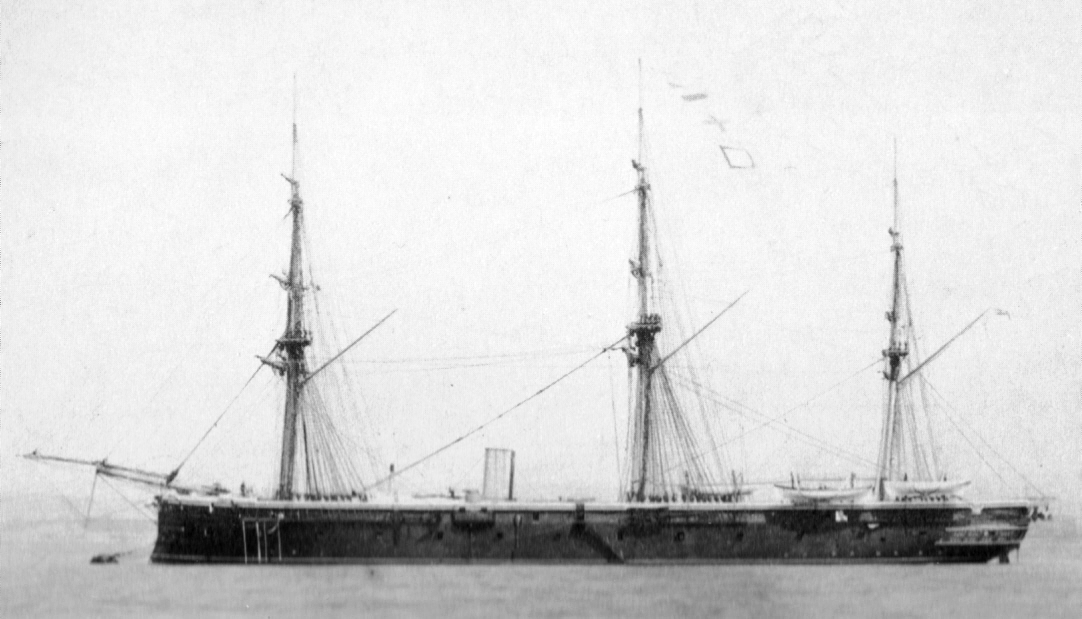
Battleship HMS Defence of 1861, as she appeared from 1866

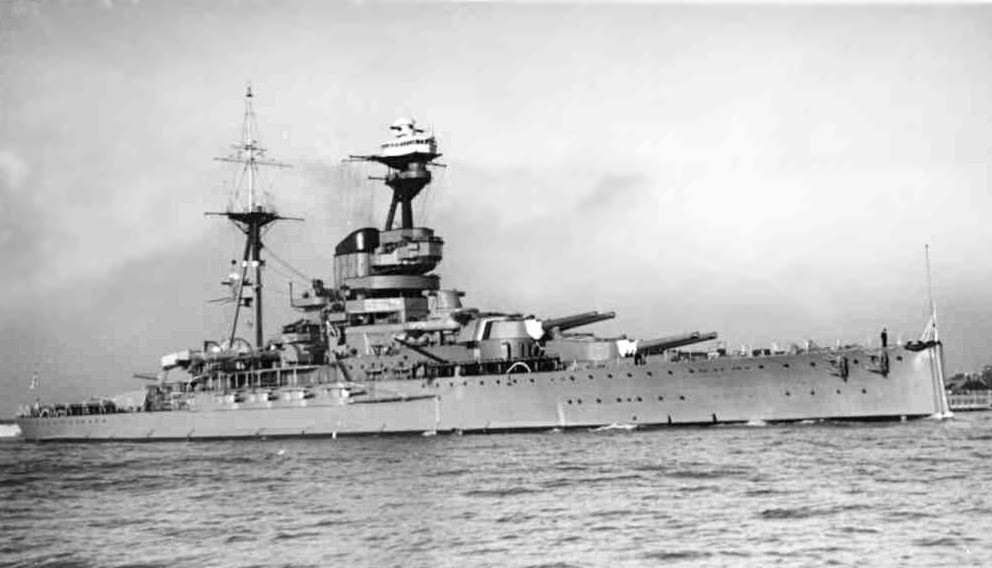
Battleship HMS Resolution of 1915, as seen in the 1930s

- HMS Defence Royal Navy (1861)
- HMS Hercules Royal Navy (1910)
- HMS Lord Nelson Royal Navy (1906)
- HMS Resolution Royal Navy (1892)
- HMS Resolution Royal Navy (1915)
- HMS Revenge Royal Navy (1892)
- HMS Russell Royal Navy (1901)
- HMS Swiftsure Royal Navy (1870)
- HMS Terror Royal Navy (1856)
- HMS Triumph Royal Navy (1870)

==== Cruisers ====
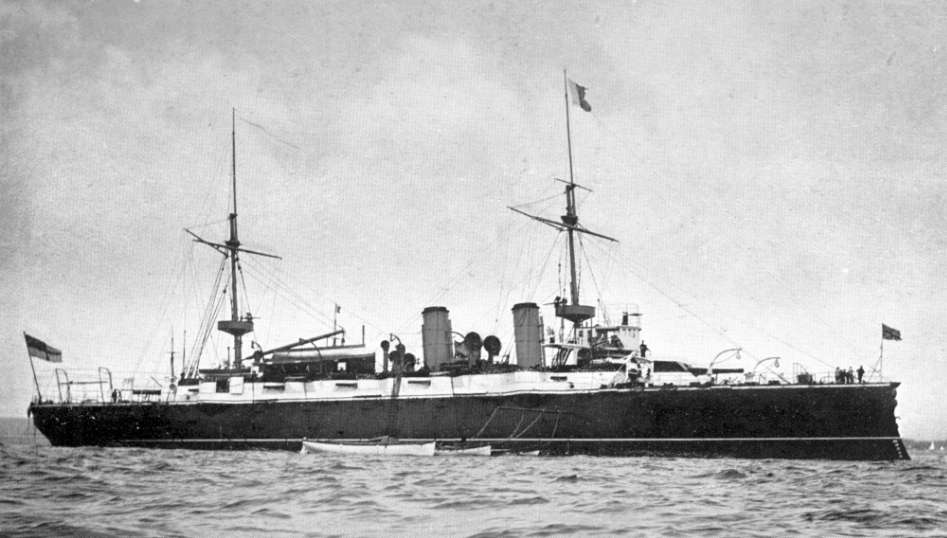
Cruiser HMS Orlando of 1886, as seen in the 1890s

- HMS Alacrity Royal Navy (1885)
- HMS Dauntless Royal Navy (1918)
- HMS Orlando Royal Navy (1886)
- HMS Pegasus Royal Navy (1897)
- HMS Pique Royal Navy (1890)
- HMS Pyramus Royal Navy (1897)
- HMCS Rainbow Royal Canadian Navy (1891)
- HMS Retribution Royal Navy (1891)
- HMS Surprise Royal Navy (1885)
- HMS Undaunted Royal Navy (1886)
- HMS York Royal Navy (1928)

==== Destroyers ====
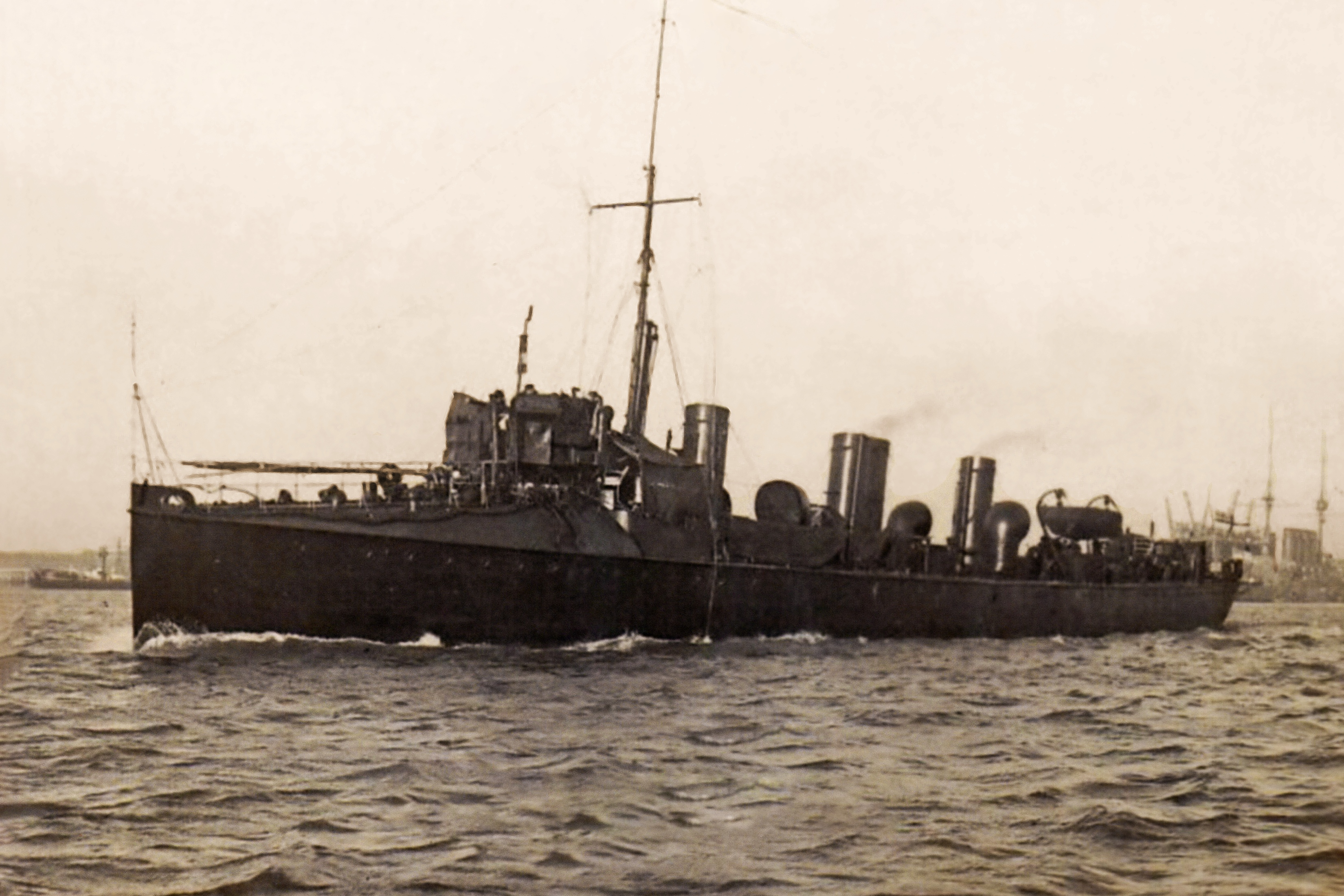
Torpedo boat destroyer HMS Spiteful, built by Palmers and launched in 1899, became the first warship to be powered only using fuel oil in 1904.

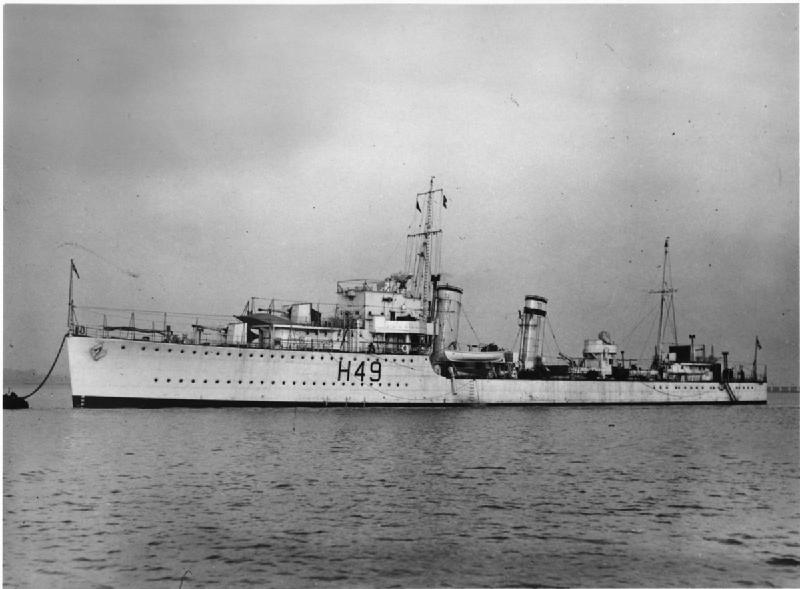
Destroyer HMS Diana of 1932, as seen in 1933

- HMS Bat Royal Navy (1896)
- HMS Chamois Royal Navy (1896)
- HMS Cherwell Royal Navy (1903)
- HMS Crane Royal Navy (1896)
- HMS Dee Royal Navy (1903)
- HMS Diana Royal Navy (1932)
- HMS Duchess Royal Navy (1932)
- HMS Erne Royal Navy (1903)
- HMS Exe Royal Navy (1903)
- HMS Ettrick Royal Navy (1903)
- HMS Fawn Royal Navy (1897)
- HMS Flirt Royal Navy (1897)
- HMS Flying Fish Royal Navy (1897)
- HMS Janus Royal Navy (1895)
- HMS Kangaroo Royal Navy (1900)
- HMS Lightning Royal Navy (1895)
- HMCS Margaree Royal Canadian Navy (1932)
- HMS Myrmidon Royal Navy (1900)
- HMS Peterel Royal Navy (1899)
- HMS Porcupine Royal Navy (1895)
- HMS Rother Royal Navy (1904)
- HMS Spiteful Royal Navy (1899)
- HMS Star Royal Navy (1896)
- HMS Swale Royal Navy (1905)
- HMS Syren Royal Navy (1900)
- HMS Ure Royal Navy (1904)
- HMS Wear Royal Navy (1905)
- HMS Whiting Royal Navy (1896)
- HMS Wryneck Royal Navy (1918)

==== Monitors ====
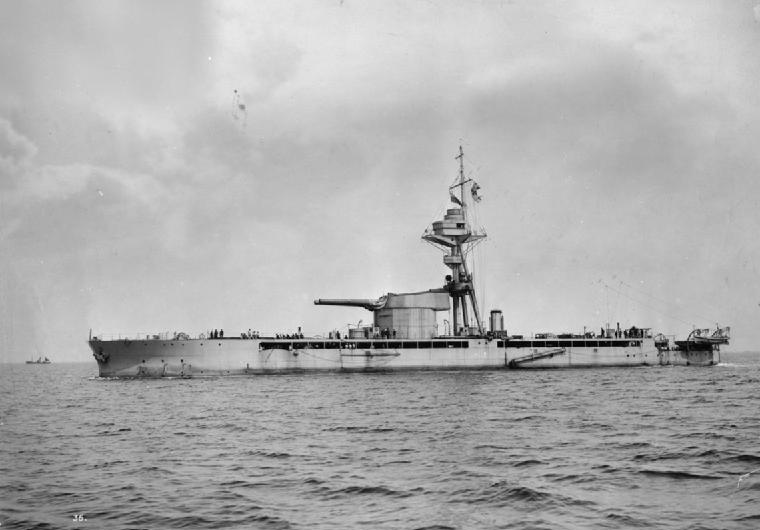
Monitor HMS Marshal Ney in 1915

- HMVS Cerberus Victorian Navy (1868)
- HMS General Wolfe Royal Navy (1915)
- HMS Gorgon Royal Navy (1871)
- HMS Marshal Ney Royal Navy (1915)
- HMS Marshal Soult Royal Navy (1915)

==== River gunboats ====
River gunboat HMS Spey of 1876

- HMS Dee Royal Navy (1877)
- HMS Don Royal Navy (1877)
- HMS Esk Royal Navy (1877)
- HMS Medina Royal Navy (1876)
- HMS Medway Royal Navy (1876)
- SMS Planet Austro-Hungarian Navy (1889)
- HMS Sabrina Royal Navy (1876)
- HMS Slaney Royal Navy (1877)
- HMS Spey Royal Navy (1876)
- HMS Tay Royal Navy (1876)
- HMS Tees Royal Navy (1876)
- HMS Trent Royal Navy (1877)
- HMS Tweed Royal Navy (1877)

=== Merchant and leisure ===
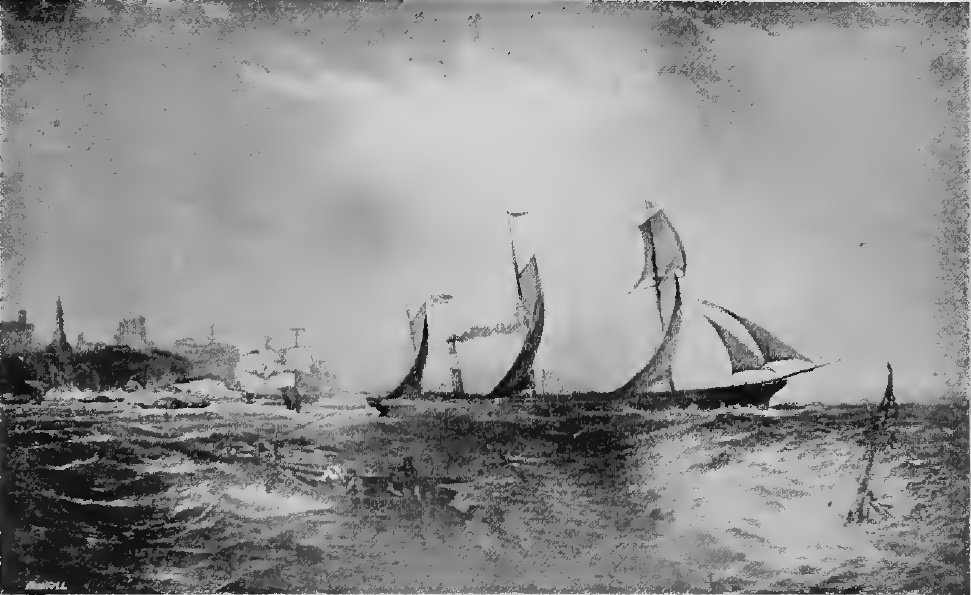
SS John Bowes of 1852, the first iron screw collier

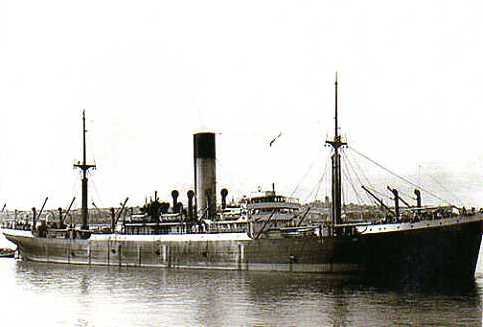
SS Meriones of 1922

==== Cable ships ====
- CS Faraday Atlantic Telegraph Company (1923)

==== Cargo ships ====
- Anne Thomas Evan Thomas Radcliffe (1882)
- Anthony Radcliffe Evan Thomas Radcliffe (1893)
- Automedon Alfred Holt and Company (1922)
- Clarrisa Radcliffe Evan Thomas Radcliffe (1889)
- Douglas Hill Evan Thomas Radcliffe (1890)
- Gairsoppa British-India Steam Navigation Company (1919)
- Gwenllian Thomas Evan Thomas Radcliffe (1882)
- Iolo Morganwg Evan Thomas Radcliffe (1882)
- John Bowes Charles Palmer (1852)
- Kate Thomas Evan Thomas Radcliffe (1884)
- Lady Palmer Evan Thomas Radcliffe (1889)
- Mary Thomas Evan Thomas Radcliffe (1889)
- Manchester Merchant (1900)
- Meriones China Mutual Steam Navigation Company (1922)
- SS Reigate Surrey Steamship Co Ltd, London (1901) (renamed Anversoise 1911)
- Slavic Prince (Prince Line Ltd, Newcastle) (1918)

==== Oil tankers ====
- British Ardour British Tanker Company (1928)
- British Aviator British Tanker Company (1924)
- British Captain British Tanker Company (1923)
- British Chemist British Tanker Company (1925)
- British Chivalry British Tanker Company (1929)
- British Corporal British Tanker Company (1922)
- British Freedom British Tanker Company (1928)
- British General British Tanker Company (1922)
- British Honour British Tanker Company (1928)
- British Industry British Tanker Company (1927)
- British Inventor British Tanker Company (1926)
- British Justice British Tanker Company (1928)
- British Light British Tanker Company (1917)
- British Loyalty British Tanker Company (1928)
- British Mariner British Tanker Company (1922)
- British Officer British Tanker Company (1922)
- British Premier British Tanker Company (1922)
- British Science British Tanker Company (1931)
- British Sergeant British Tanker Company (1922)
- British Splendour British Tanker Company (1931)
- British Strength British Tanker Company (1931)
- British Yeoman British Tanker Company (1923)

==== Passenger ships ====
- SS Connaught (1860)
- SS Helvetia (1864)
- SS Armenia (1896)
- SS Nevada (1868)

==== Steam yachts ====
- Xantha Henry Paget, 2nd Marquess of Anglesey (1867)

==== Tugs ====
- PT Northumberland G. Wascoe, Shields, 1852 Yard number 1

==== Cargo vessels ====
- S.S. Socotra, 1897

== See also ==
- List of shipbuilders and shipyards

== General and cited references ==
- Anon. (1899). "Launches and Trial Trips". The Marine Engineer. Vol. 20. pp. 474–6. OCLC 10460390.
- Anon. (1902). "Palmer's Shipbuilding and Iron Company, Jarrow-on-Tyne". Proceedings of the Institution of Mechanical Engineers: 613–6. OCLC 863604422.
- Cuthbert, Jim; Smith, Ken (2004). Palmers of Jarrow 1851–1933. Tyne Bridge Pub. ISBN 1-85795-196-4.
- Dillon, Malcolm (1900). Some Account of the Works of Palmers Shipbuilding & Iron Company Limited. Franklin. OCLC 68103311.
- Evening Chronicle. "Charles Palmer" (blog). Newcastle-upon-Tyne, Northumberland, England: NCJ Media Ltd, a subsidiary of Reach plc. Archived from the original on 8 February 2009.
- Evening Chronicle (29 May 2004) [updated 30 May 2004 & 28 February 2013]. "Collier Who Steamed Into North Legend" (blog). Newcastle-upon-Tyne, Northumberland, England: NCJ Media Ltd, a subsidiary of Reach plc. Archived from the original on 3 March 2016.
- Friedman, Norman (2009). British Destroyers: From Earliest Days to the Second World War. Barnsley, UK: Seaforth Publishing. ISBN 978-1-84832-049-9.
- Gibbs, Frederick T. M. (1896). The Illustrated Guide to the Royal Navy and Foreign Navies; Also Mercantile Marine Steamers Available as Armed Cruisers and Transports, &c. Waterlow Bros. & Layton. OCLC 12714917.
- Johnston, Ian; Buxton, Ian (2013). The Battleship Builders – Constructing and Arming British Capital Ships (Hardback). Annapolis, Maryland: Naval Institute Press. ISBN 978-1-59114-027-6.
- SS Helvetia. 3,318 gross. Built in 1864 at Jarrow-on-Tyne by Palmer's Shipbuilding & Iron Co. Ltd. Norway Heritage: Passenger Lists and Emigrant Ships from Norway, blog of Børge Solem, Rissa, Norway.
- Wilkinson, Ellen (1939). The Town That Was Murdered, The Life-Story of Jarrow. Victor Gollancz Ltd.
