= Reed water tube boiler =

Type of water tube boiler

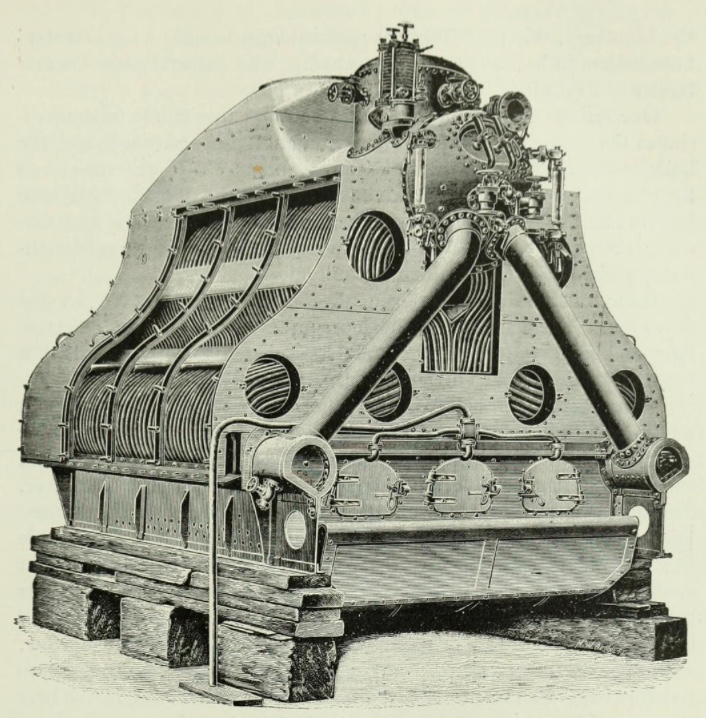
A Reed water tube boiler built for HMS Janus of 1895: the incomplete casing allows a view of the arrangement of the steam-generating tubes. The two large, external tubes at the near end, and another pair at the far end, known as "down-comers", passed cooler water from the top chamber to the two bottom chambers, thereby enhancing circulation.

The Reed water tube boiler was a type of water tube boiler developed by J. W. Reed, manager of the engine works at Palmers Shipbuilding and Iron Company of Jarrow, England, where it was manufactured from 1893 to 1905. At this time, Palmers was a vertically integrated business: in its shipyard at Jarrow, using iron ore from its own mine in North Yorkshire, it produced the iron and steel needed for its ships, and engines and boilers of its own design.

Intended for use in the steam propulsion of ships, the Reed water tube boiler was similar to other boilers such as the Normand and Yarrow, themselves developments of the du Temple boiler. These differed from locomotive boilers, also known as "fire tube boilers", in that, whereas the fire tube boiler consisted of a cylinder filled with water, which was heated by tubes passing through it carrying exhaust gases from a furnace, in the water tube boiler the situation was reversed, with water passing through steam-generating tubes mounted directly above the furnace. Advantages of the water tube boiler included comparative lightness and the ability to run at higher pressures. About 170 of Reed's water tube boilers were installed in ships of the Royal Navy, in two of which they were installed to replace boilers rejected by the Admiralty.

== Design ==
The Reed water tube boiler was developed and patented in 1893 by J. W. Reed, manager of the engine works at Palmers Shipbuilding and Iron Company, which manufactured it. By the last quarter of the 19th century Palmers had become one of Britain's largest shipbuilders and, during its operation between 1851 and 1933, it produced "more than 900" ships. However, it was a vertically integrated business: from about 1857 it possessed its own source of iron ore, mined near the North Yorkshire coast in the vicinity of Whitby and Saltburn, and, according to the local historians Jim Cuthbert and Ken Smith, "it was said that [Palmers' shipyard] brought in iron ore at one end ... and sent it away again at the other end in the form of finished ships." (Note: Palmers supplemented its own supply of iron ore with higher grade, hematite ore from Spain.) Thus the Reed water tube boiler was a natural addition to the company's output, which had previously included other designs of boiler, such as the Belleville boiler, besides steam engines. (Note: "[I]t is worth noting that the first set of triple-expansion engines used in the British Navy were made in these works.")

It was similar to its antecedent the du Temple boiler, and other developments from it such as the Normand and Yarrow boilers, in that each featured three cylindrical water chambers arranged to form a triangle or, viewed from one end, an inverted "V" shape: the entire boiler was filled with water but for the upper part of the top chamber, which allowed for the collection of steam, and was connected by two banks of steam-generating tubes to the two lower chambers, between which was a furnace. (Note: In a diagram of a Reed boiler fitted to the torpedo boat destroyer HMS Lightning of 1895, provision is illustrated for 694 steam-generating tubes.) Water tube boilers could operate at higher pressures and were much lighter than locomotive boilers, also known as "fire tube boilers" or, when used in ships, as "marine boilers". In these, water was contained in a single drum through which tubes carried exhaust gases from a furnace: a locomotive boiler had to be constructed from heavier gauge materials, since the greater size of the single drum required a thicker shell, and, while the tubes in a water tube boiler were subject only to tension from the steam and pressurised water within, a locomotive boiler's tubes were subject to compression from without, again requiring thicker materials. (Note: A more comprehensive assessment of the advantages of water tube boilers in naval vessels was published in Page's Magazine in 1902: "On making a careful comparison between water-tube and [fire-tube] boilers, we find that the former will raise steam more quickly and maintain it more evenly and at much greater pressure. They can be much more easily renewed or repaired, without having to lay up the ship or pull up her decks for this purpose. They are not so dangerous in action, and will not suffer so seriously from small projectiles. The effect on the ship's company will not be so disastrous in the event of an explosion, because they contain only a very small amount of water for steam generation. They are very much lighter and produce more horse-power per ton of weight, and thus enable advantages to be secured either in speed of vessel or in the amount of armour, armament, or coal supply. They can be "forced" or made to produce a greater quantity of steam for longer periods, and can therefore continue steaming at higher powers, and in this connection also they are assisted by a larger fire-grate area, which enables them to maintain steam for their maximum powers with greater facility.")

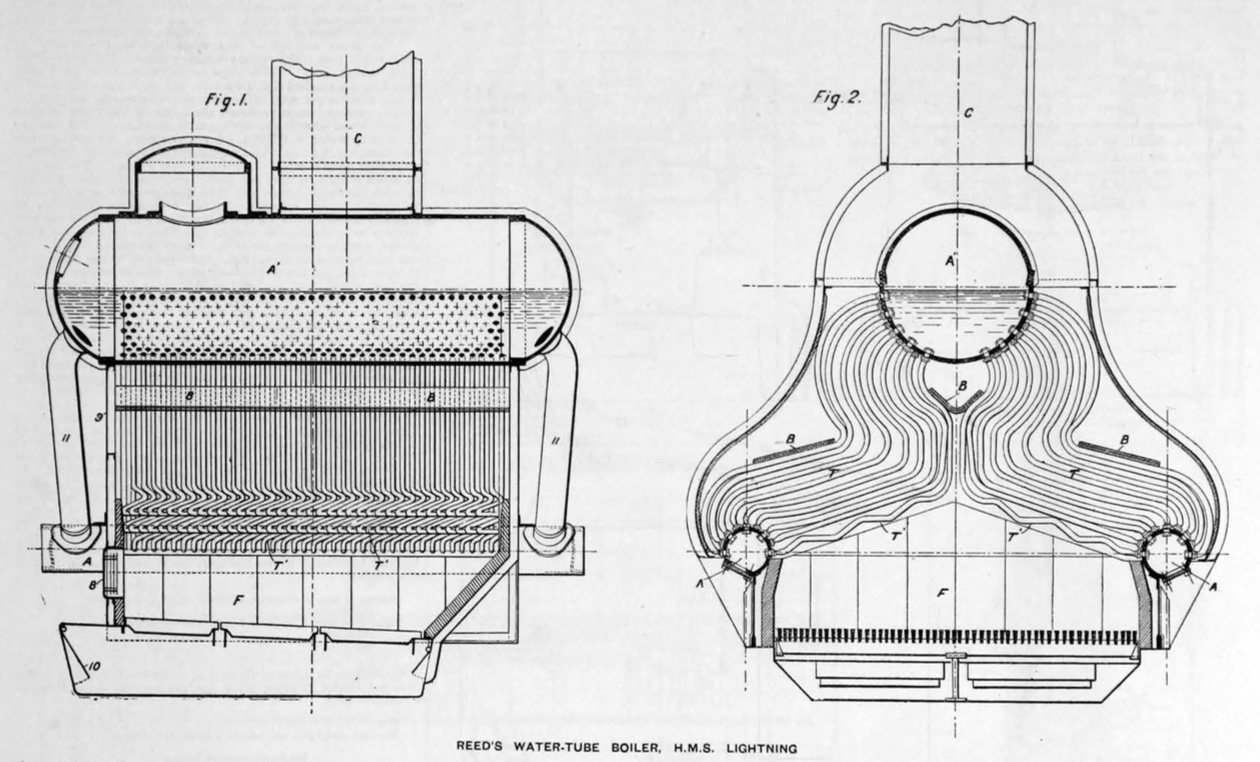
Longitudinal and cross sections of a Reed water tube boiler as installed in torpedo boat destroyer HMS Lightning of 1895: the black lines adjacent to and above the steam-generating tubes in the cross section are baffles designed to optimise the passage of hot gases around the tubes. Both diagrams illustrate the designed water level in the top chamber, below which the steam-generating tubes were connected.

In the Normand boiler, the tubes were comparatively straight and a portion of those in the inner and outer rows of each bank were formed into "tube walls" to direct hot gases generated by the furnace through the boiler. In the Reed boiler, the tubes were bent into pronounced curves of varying radii to maximise surface area and therefore steam production, and baffles were used to direct hot gases. The lowest section of the lowest tubes of Reed boilers was originally bent into tight, "wavy" curves, also to maximise surface area, but this was discontinued by 1901 as it inhibited the flow of water and hence also steam. Further, the external diameter of the tubes tapered at their lower ends from 1 1/16 inches (27 mm) to 7/8 inch (22 mm) to improve the passage of hot gases between them. They were connected perpendicularly to the chambers at each end, as were the tubes in the Normand boiler, to reduce stress. However, in the Reed boiler these connections were made by hemispherical faces, which allowed "a certain angular play". The tubes were secured by nuts inside the chambers at each end. (Note: In HMS Lightning and HMS Janus, both of 1895, "there [were] in all upwards of 30,000 [of these] joints, and though they [had] been many times under steam, not a single leak ... occurred.") Handholes gave access to the bottom chambers, and a manhole gave access to the top chamber, allowing rapid replacement of defective tubes. In both types of boiler, the steam-generating tubes joined the top chamber below the designed water line to stop them overheating: in another type of water tube boiler, the Thornycroft, the steam-generating tubes joined the top chamber above the water line, and their tops were "observed to get red-hot when the water was low." Overheated tubes were liable to fail. Large, external "down-comer" tubes transferred water from the top chamber to the two bottom ones. The down-comers thus promoted convection within the boiler, which needed to be rapid because of the small diameter of the tubes, and formed "a substantial part of [its] framework."

Steam was collected inside a dome on top of the top chamber, from which it passed out of the boiler for use via engine room controls, and in the Reed boiler all but the dome and the ends of the three water chambers was enclosed in a double-layered casing with an air gap and asbestos lining that reduced the temperature of the outer layer. The casing rose at the top to form an outlet for hot gases into a funnel. The furnace was fed with coal by stokers through firebox doors at one end, and, whereas the Normand boiler required a fire of about 18 inches (460 mm) depth, the Reed boiler required a shallower one of between 8 and 12 inches (200–300 mm). Air was admitted to the furnace through the air gap in the boiler casing, thus providing a supply of heated air that was directed to the rear of the ashpan. This air entered the ashpan through three doors that, along with the firebox doors, closed automatically if a tube failed, the intention being to prevent flames, steam and debris escaping into the boiler room. A constant supply of pure water was essential for this type of boiler, as a shortage of water would rapidly result in an empty boiler liable to severe damage from the furnace, and the deposition of any contaminant, such as limescale, would result in a significant loss of efficiency and could block tubes. (Note: HMS Pegasus, built by Palmers and launched in 1897, had eight Reed boilers, and was disabled when her condensers leaked and allowed sea water into her boilers.) To surmount this problem, boiler feedwater circulated in a closed system from the boiler as steam to the engines and then to condensers, from which it returned as water to the boiler, thus completing a cycle. However, some incidental loss of water from the system was unavoidable, and the French naval engineer Louis-Émile Bertin regarded a 5% loss of water per cycle as the maximum that could be sustained in a water tube boiler installation. Therefore, additional feedwater was required, and it was supplied by apparatus such as an evaporator, as was fitted in HMS Spiteful, built by Palmers and launched in 1899. Each boiler had its own feedwater pump, and a feedwater regulator also of Reed's design.

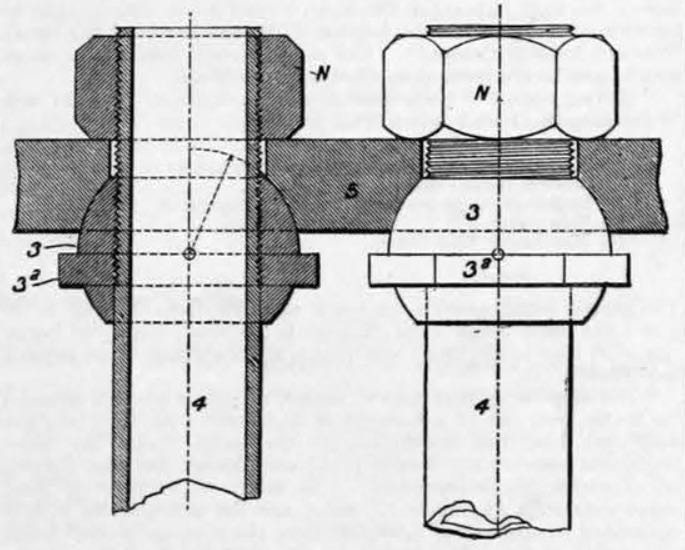
A cross section and plan of the connection between water tubes and a water chamber in a Reed boiler. The spheroidal ferrules "3" are screwed onto the tubes, which are then inserted into holes in the water chamber wall that are of slightly larger diameter than the tubes; the tubes are then secured by nuts "N" on the inside of the chamber.

Another type of boiler similar to and later than the du Temple boiler was the Yarrow boiler, which usually dispensed with external down-comer tubes after its designer, Alfred Yarrow, demonstrated in 1896 that they were not essential to the circulation of water inside a boiler of this type. (Note: In Yarrow boilers groups of tubes were sometimes screened by baffles to create internal down-comers, or tubes might be used as stays that served the same purpose.) However, while the Yarrow boiler employed entirely straight tubes through which water and steam circulated more freely, it was considered by some contemporary writers on the subject such as Leslie S. Robertson as "behind" in its circulation because of the absence of down-comers. (Note: The issue was contentious: while the inventor Hiram Maxim regarded down-comers as "utterly superfluous", the shipbuilder John Thornycroft regarded them as "indispensable".) Whereas the Yarrow boilers fitted to the armoured cruiser HMS Warrior of 1905 evaporated 11.664 pounds (5.291 kg) of water per pound (454 g) of coal at 100 degrees centigrade (212 degrees Fahrenheit) with natural draught, by the same measure a Reed boiler as fitted to the torpedo boat destroyer HMS Star of 1896 evaporated 12 pounds (5.44 kg). An advantage of the Yarrow boiler was in weight: whereas the Reed boilers in the cruiser HMS Pegasus of 1897 produced 38.5 indicated horsepower (IHP) per ton (1016 kg) of boiler at full power, by the same measure the Yarrow boilers in a slightly earlier Swordfish-class torpedo boat destroyer produced 73 IHP. But, whereas for example a Star-class torpedo boat destroyer of 1896 required four Reed boilers to achieve its specified top speed of 30 knots, a similar Swordfish-class vessel required eight Yarrow boilers to achieve its specified top speed of 27 knots. As fitted to torpedo boat destroyer HMS Lightning in 1895, a dry Reed boiler weighed 13.25 tons (12.44 tonnes).

A Reed boiler could be designed to operate at internal pressures of up to 300 pounds per square inch (2,068 kilopascals) and, as constructed for torpedo boat destroyers such as Spiteful, which was capable of steaming at 30 knots, a set of four boilers and associated machinery required nearly 25 miles (40 kilometres) of tubing. Overall, her four boilers each measured about 12 feet (3.7 m) long by 10 feet (3 m) wide and, from the platforms on which her stokers worked, known as "firing flats", about 10 feet (3 m) high. (Note: A plan of 1901 corrected to 28 September 1905 for the torpedo boat destroyer HMS Spiteful shows the arrangement and proportions of her four Reed boilers.) While each of eight Reed boilers in Pegasus had a grate area of about 45 square feet (4.2 m^{2}) and a heating area of about 2,360 square feet (219 m^{2}), together they produced up to 7,127 IHP (5,315 kilowatts). (Note: In 2011, an average household in the United Kingdom consumed 3,300 kilowatt hours of electricity per year.)

== Production and use ==
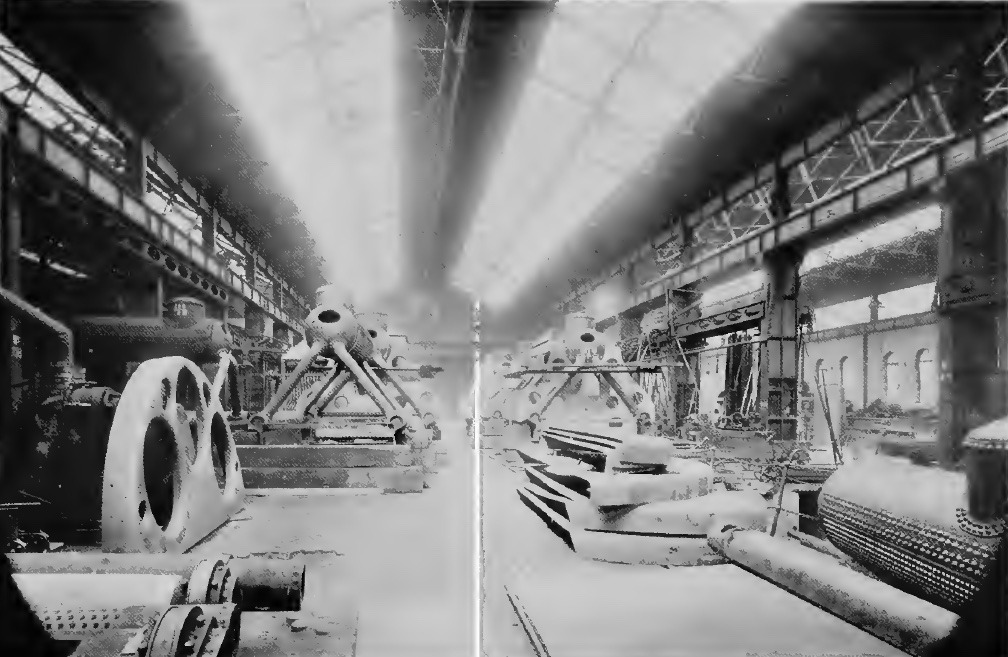
Most major boiler components in this view of the boiler shop at Palmers in about 1900 are for Reed water tube boilers.

Reed water tube boilers were a "speciality" of the engine works at Palmers, which was capable of producing one "heavy marine boiler" a week, besides "a large number of water tube boilers". While equipment designed by Reed was used in merchant ships, for example the SS Hanoi built in Sunderland in 1893 for the French mail service between Haiphong in Vietnam and Hong Kong in China, about 170 of his water tube boilers were used in ships of the Royal Navy. These included cruisers, destroyers and gunboats, besides torpedo boat destroyers, of which Palmers alone built 16. Among these was Spiteful, in which the boilers were later adapted to burn fuel oil. Reed boilers were also installed in ships ordered by the Admiralty from other shipbuilders, for example on the River Clyde in Scotland. Two torpedo boat destroyers built by Hanna, Donald & Wilson of Paisley, HMS Fervent and HMS Zephyr, both launched in 1895, were fitted with four Reed boilers each by order of the Admiralty and at a cost of £14,200, after it rejected the locomotive boilers installed by their builders. (Note: "The firm had originally offered to fit water tube boilers of their own design, but the Admiralty, presumably wary of an untried type of boiler, had offered for locomotive boilers instead. However, [they] proved quite inadequate ... on trials in the late summer and autumn of 1895. ... The builders [again] offered their own design but the Admiralty preferred to order Reed boilers from Palmer's.") Similarly HMS Niger, a torpedo gunboat built by the Barrow Shipbuilding Company of Barrow-in-Furness, Cumbria, in 1892, had her boilers replaced with Reed boilers in 1902. Production of the Reed water tube boiler ceased in 1905.

== See also ==
- Three-drum boiler
