= HMS Leander (1882) =

Cruiser of the Royal Navy

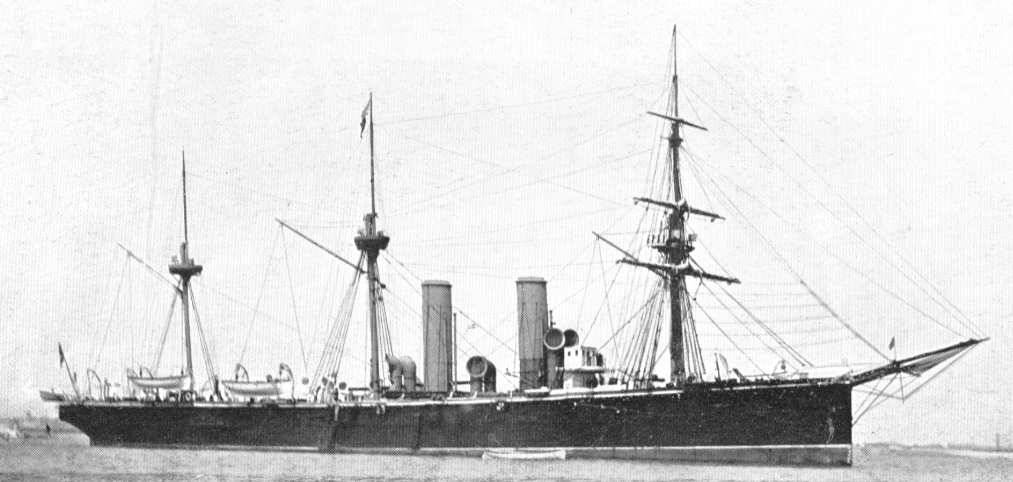
- HMS Leander in 1897

History

United Kingdom
- Name: Leander
- Ordered: 1880
- Builder: Napier, Glasgow
- Laid down: 14 June 1880
- Launched: 28 October 1882
- Commissioned: 29 May 1885
- Decommissioned: 18 December 1919
- Fate: Sold 1 July 1920

General characteristics
- Class & type: Leander-class second-class partially protected cruiser
- Displacement: 4,300 tons (4,400 tonnes) load
- Tons burthen: 3,750 tons (B.O.M.).
- Length: 300 ft (91 m) between perpendiculars.; 315 ft (96 m) overall.
- Beam: 46 ft (14 m).
- Draught: 20 ft 8 in (6.30 m) aft, 19 ft 6 in (5.94 m) forward; with 950 tons (970 tonnes) of coal and complete with stores and provisions.
- Propulsion: Sails and screw. Two shafts. Two cylinder horizontal direct acting compound engines, 12 cylindrical boilers, 5,500 ihp (4,100 kW).
- Speed: 16.5 knots designed; 17-18 knots after funnels raised
- Range: 11,000 nmi at 10 knots.; 725 tons coal normal, 1000 tons maximum = c. 6,000 nmi at economical speed.
- Complement: (1885): 275
- Armament: (1885): 10 × 6-inch breechloading guns; 8 1-inch Nordenfelt guns; 2 5-barrel and 2 2-barrel 0.45 in machineguns; 4 above water torpedo dischargers.
- Armour: 1.5 in (40 mm) steel armoured deck (with sloped sides) over 165 ft.; 1.5 in (40 mm) gun shields.
- Notes: Carried 2 second-class torpedo boats.; Carried 7 pdr and 9 pdr boat guns and field guns.

HMS Leander was a second class cruiser, name ship of the Royal Navy's first Leander-class cruisers. During a revolution in Panama in 1900, Leander helped protect the lives and property of foreign residents.

== Design and construction ==
The Leander was built by Napier in Glasgow, being laid down in 1880, launched in 1882 and completed in 1885. The Leander class were originally designated as steel dispatch vessels, but were reclassified as second class cruisers before they were completed. The design was an improved version of the Iris class, with an armoured deck and better armament. The Leander had three masts and two funnels; she was square-rigged on the fore-mast and gaff-rigged on the two masts behind the funnels. She was armed with ten breech-loading (BL) 6-inch (150 mm) guns, 16 machine guns and four above-water torpedo tubes. Four of the machine guns were later replaced by four quick-firing (QF) 3-pounder guns.

After her sister ship Phaeton's trials, the Leander had her funnels raised six feet (1.8 m) to improve the draught to the boilers. Once this was done, the Leander exceeded her designed speed. She was the only one of her class to have forced draught. The Leander was a good steamer, but a poor sea-boat with a heavy roll in some sea conditions.

== Seagoing career ==
=== 1885–1889 ===
Sketch of Leander, c. 1884

On 29 May 1885, Captain Martin J Dunlop arrived on board at Chatham and commissioned the ship. The first few days were spent first cleaning and then provisioning the ship. On 3 June, they tested the flooding arrangements of the magazines and shell rooms and found they were correct. On 5 June at 16:00, Leander was hauled out of the basin and proceeded under steam down the Medway in charge of the pilot and at 17:45 secured to the swinging buoy at Sheerness the engines using 5 tons 8 cwt (5.5 t) of coal and the ship a further 3 cwt (0.15 t); no coal was used distilling. One man fell overboard, and went on the sick list. On 6 June they took on board powder, shot and shell, and 300 lb of fresh beef and 200 lb of vegetables. On 8 June they swung the ship to adjust the compasses. On 9 June, the ship went out for gunnery practice, burning 26 tons 5 cwt (26.7 t) of coal for the engines and 6 cwt (0.3 t) for the ship. She fired 21 rounds from the 6-in BL; firing caused a number of breakages: 1 axial vent for a 6-in BL, the glass of two electric light projectors [searchlights], and the Pawl of Compressor of Admiralty Carriage.

Still secured to the buoy off Sheerness Dockyard, she received 90 lb of fresh vegetables and 182 lb fresh beef on 10 June. On 11 June, she was inspected by the Commander-in-Chief. Repairs in the engine room appeared to be complete by early afternoon, and fires were lighted in four boilers between 14:30 and 15:30; the ship prepared for sea, however soon after 18:00 a defect was found in the after centrifugal fan spindle in the engine room, so fires were banked. Artificers worked all night to repair the defect. Repairs in the engine room were completed by 17:00 on 12 June. Fires were brought forward in the boilers, and at 19:00, the ship slipped and proceeded out under steam. She proceeded to Portsmouth; travelling 154 nautical miles under steam burning 35 tons 18 cwt (36.5 t) coal for the engines and 6 cwt for the ship. At Portsmouth she saluted the admiral superintendent with 11 guns at 14:35. On 15 June she stowed Whitehead torpedoes. Some torpedoes were fired to test them.

On 16 June she proceeded to Berehaven arriving on the evening of 17 June finding there the Evolutionary Squadron consisting of Minotaur, Hercules, Agincourt, Sultan, Polyphemus, Devastation, Iron Duke, Hotspur, Lord Warden, Repulse, Shannon, Ajax, Penelope, Hecla, Rupert, Cormorant, Conquest, Mercury, Racer, Mariner, Hawke. At 18:30 she saluted the flag of Admiral Sir Geoffrey Phipps Hornby with 17 guns.

Evolutionary Squadron was engaged in what became the first of the Victorian Royal Navy's annual manoeuvres. When the Leander joined on 17 June, she was attached to the ships blockading Berehaven. On 18 June "the weather was so stormy that all exercises were suspended... After sunset, the Conquest, Mercury, Leander, Racer, Cormorant and Mariner with the torpedo boats attached to them got under way top take up their position of observation outside the haven. The weather proved so boisterous that the blockading division returned before it had reached the open water outside. In returning... the Leander, while manoeuvring to keep clear of the Conquest, struck on the Hornet rock, and was seriously injured. As soon as the accident occurred the engines were stopped, the watertight doors closed, the pumps were set going, and collision mats and sails were passed under the ship's bottom. After some time it was found that e pumps failed to gain on the leak. On the following day the ship was moved nearer the shore, so as to be ready to beach in case of necessity. Early, however on the 21st the divers succeeded in finding the leak and stopping it with the patent leak-stopper. The ship's hold was thereupon cleared of water." It was not until 24 June that Leander was ready to go to sea again. On 26 June, the Leander, escorted by the Mercury, arrived at Devonport, where she was placed in dock. The damage to the Leader was described as follows: "The sea entered through numerous rivet holes where rivets had been sheared, but the compartment kept the ship afloat in a working condition." Amongst the stores destroyed by water were 168 lb of soft soap and 400 lb powder (propellant for the guns). The repairs to the ship cost £8,947.

After her brief service with the 1885 Evolutionary Squadron, the Leander served on the China Station.

=== 1889–1892 ===
Leander was re-commissioned at Hong Kong by Captain Burges Watson on 5 April 1889, and served again on the China Station.

=== 1892–1895 ===
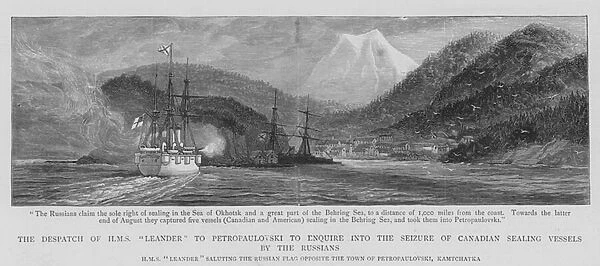
The despatch of HMS 'Leander' to Petropaulovski to enquire into the seizure of Canadian sealing vessels by the Russians. The Graphic 1892

Leander was re-commissioned at Hong Kong by Captain William Mc C.F. Castle on 3 May 1892, and served again on the China Station.

=== 1895–1897 ===
The following account of Leander's time in reserve and her refit was written at least 25 years after the event by a retired paymaster officer. In some details this is at variance with the account in the Leander's logbook for 1897 (see next section).

"The Leander paid off at Chatham after many years in China [in November 1895]. Naturally she was in a bad state, and the Dockyard officers reported her as only fit for C Division of the Reserve; that is to say, she required an extensive refit, which meant landing all her stores and stripping her. This was reported to the Controller [Rear Admiral J.A. Fisher], and he wired back that the Leander was to be paid off into the A Division, meaning that no repairs were to be taken in hand, and that her name would appear in the list of ships ready for sea at forty-eight hours notice. As this was contrary to Regulations, besides being false, a further report was made to the Admiralty. Fisher replied: 'If the dockyard offers will not do as I tell them, I will replace them by others who will.' The Leander paid off all standing, and I was ordered to keep her defect lists and reports of the survey until the Admiralty should be pleased to order them to be taken in hand. After some months [actually 1897] Admiralty orders were received for the Leander to be commissioned by Captain Fegen for the Pacific. We reported that she was unfit to go to sea until refitted. The reply was that the Admiralty orders were to be obeyed. The Leander did commission at Chatham. She got as far as Portsmouth, where Sir Nowel Salmon was Commander-in-Chief, whom Fisher could not bully. the result was that the Leander was detained at Portsmouth to have her necessary defects made good. If anything had happened to her owing to her unseaworthy state, it would have been scandalous."

=== 1897–1901 ===
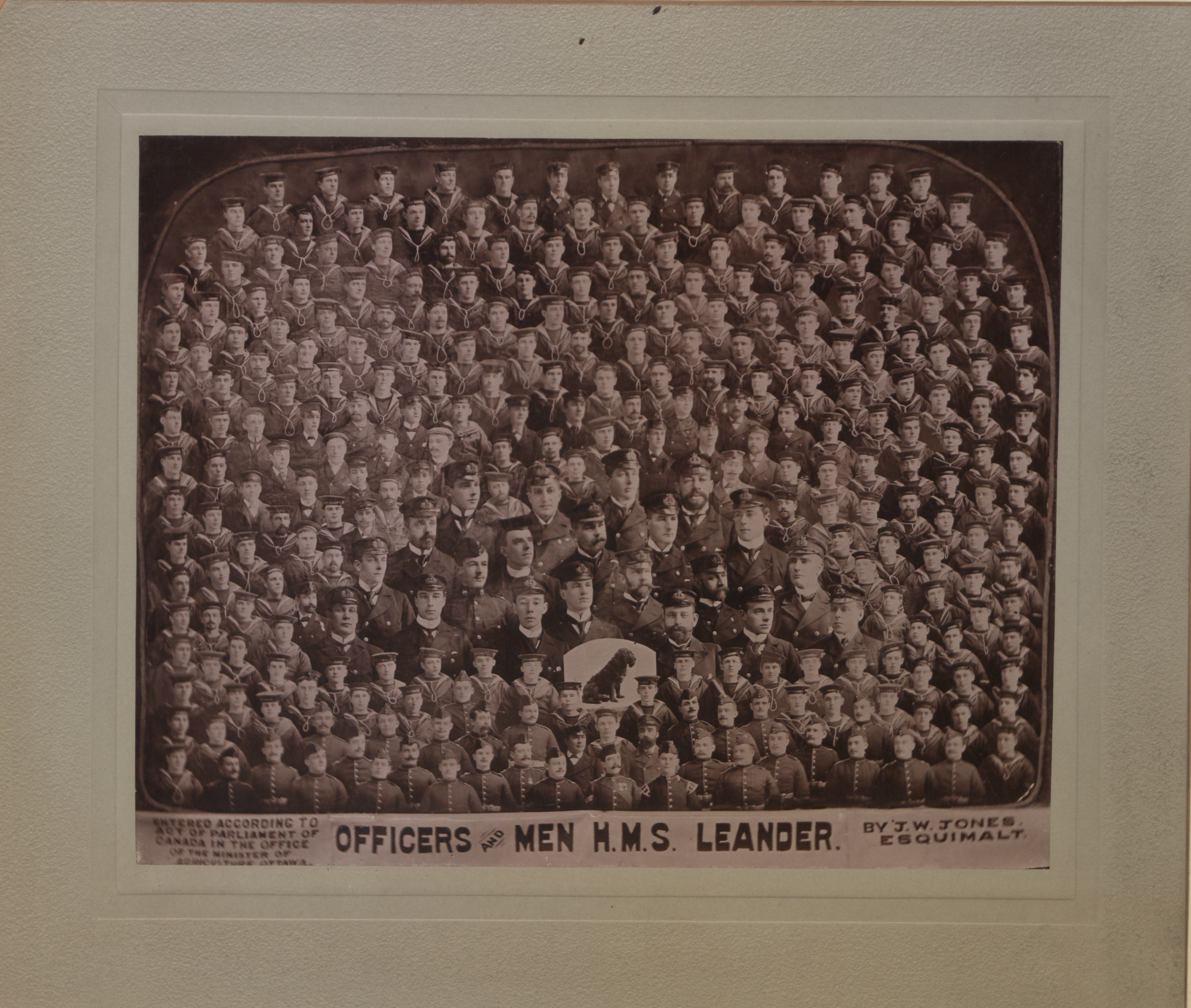
Officers and men of HMS Leander (HS85-10-11263)

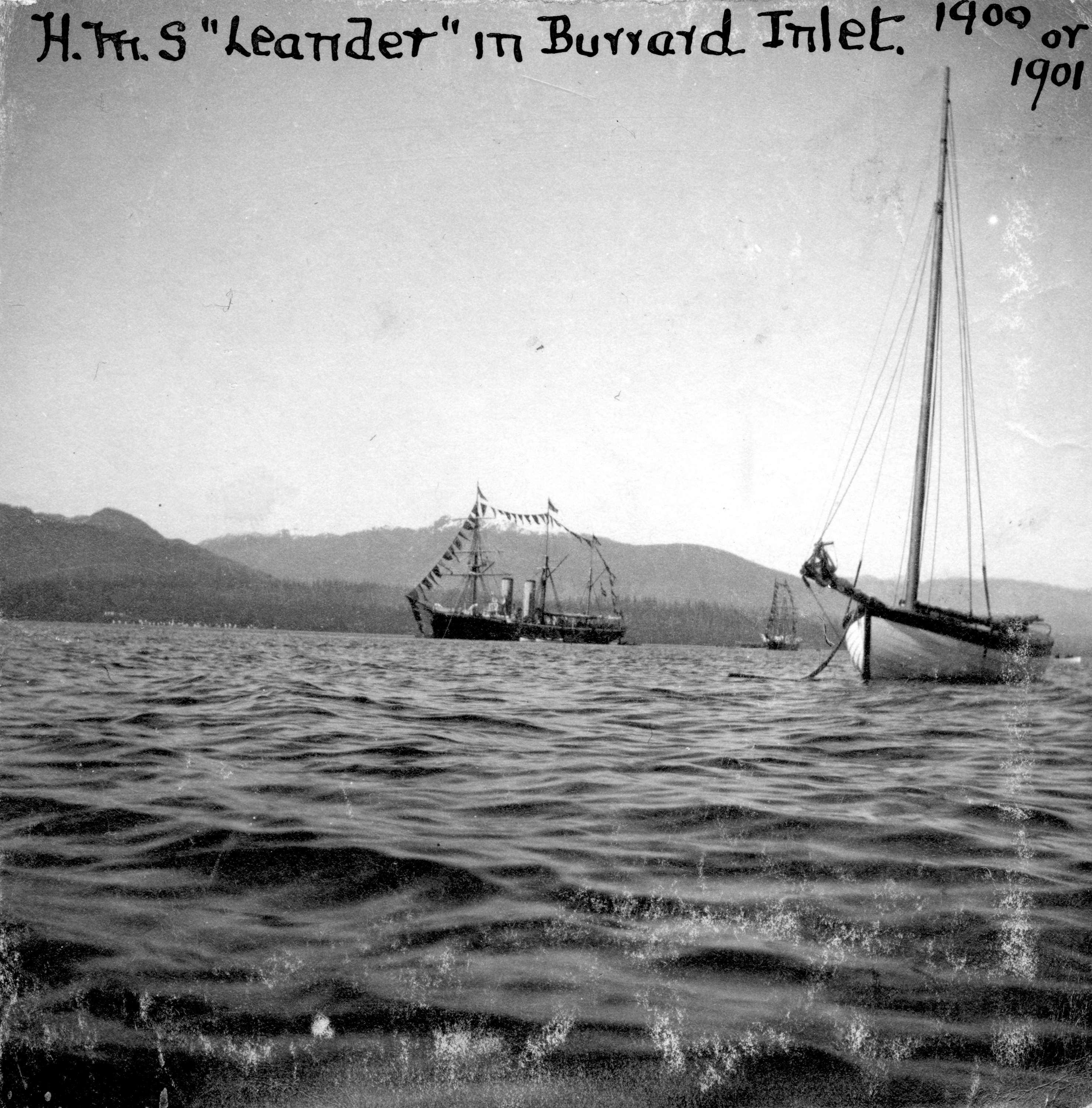
HMS Leander at Vancouver

Leander was commissioned by Captain FF Fegen at Chatham on Tuesday 8 June 1897. On the morning on 11 June, she was moved to No 8 buoy Sheerness, where she was swung to measure the deviation of her magnetic compass. On 16 June she was moved to No 4 Buoy in Little Nore, and the next day to the Downs off Deal. At 2115 on 19 June she weighed anchor and proceeded to Spithead, where she arrived the next day. She remained at Spithead until 2 July, and then went to Berehaven, arriving on 4 July. She left Berehaven on 7 July, going to the rendezvous for manoeuvres. She then stopped at Falmouth Harbour four hours on 11 July. She had gunnery practice on 12 July, expending 25 6-in common shell, 5 6-in shrapnel, 10 6-in blanks, and 27 rounds of 3-pdr Hotchkiss. She then returned to Sheerness arriving on 14 July. On 20 July, dockyard hands started being employed on board each day, finishing on 9 August (including weekends). Typically the number of dockyard hands was between 11 and 22. On 12 August she was reswung at Sheerness, and then she put to sea arriving at Plymouth the next day. She remained at Plymouth until she sailed for Vigo on 19 August, arriving on 22 August. She was again reswung off Vigo on 24 August 1897. She arrived at Valparaiso (Chile) on 28 October. She had gunnery practice again in November 1897, expending 35 cast steel 6-in filled common shell, 5 iron 6-in filled shrapnel shells, 20 3-pdr, 78 cartridges saluting, 2 green very lights, and 1,120 rounds .45" machine gun ball cartridges. The 1900 issue of Jane's Fighting Ships credits her with a crew of 309.

Leander served in the Pacific from 1897 to 1900. A photograph of the Leander taken on 25 June 1897, shows that she still had masts and yards. "In 1900 she did good work during a revolution in Panama in protecting the lives and property of foreign residents." She was paid off at Chatham on 15 January 1901 for refitting.

=== 1901–1904 ===
In 1902 it was decided that Leander was obsolete as a cruiser and should be fitted as a "depôt ship for torpedo boat destroyers" in the Mediterranean. The Leander was reboilered as part of this refit. On 2 May 1902 the Secretary of the Admiralty, Mr Arnold-Forster, was asked in the House of Commons about the choice of boilers. The old boilers were cylindrical single-ended boilers fitted on in 1883. The replacement boilers were of the same type, made by Messrs. J. Brown & Co. of Clydebank. The Leander's refit was again controversial.

=== 1904–1920 ===
The Leander was commissioned as a "depot ship for torpedo boat destroyers" by Captain John M de Robeck on 21 January 1904 (presumably at Chatham). She served as part of the Mediterranean Fleet. On 1 June 1904, de Robeck left the ship as a result of being censured over Leander's refit. De Robeck was put on half-pay.

In March 1904, the Mediterranean Fleet consisted of:

- Battleships: Albemarle, Bulwark, Duncan, Exmouth, Formidable, Illustrious, Implacable, Irresistible, London, Montagu, Renown, Russell, Venerable
- Armoured cruisers: Aboukir, Bacchante
- Protected cruisers: Arrogant, Diana, Furious, Hermione, Intrepid, Mohawk, Naiad, Pandora, Pegasus, Pioneer, Pyramus, Surprise
- Torpedo Boat Destroyers (TBD): Albatross, Ariel, Banshee, Bat, Bruizer, Chamois, Crane, Cygnet, Cynthia, Desperate, Fawn, Flying Fish, Griffon, Kangaroo, Mallard, Myrmidon, Orwell, Panther, Seal, Stag, Thrasher
- Torpedo Gunboats (TGB): Dryad, Harrier, Hussar, Speedy
- Torpedo Boat Carrier: Vulcan
- Torpedo Boat Destroyer Depot Ship: Leander
- Depot ships: Hibernia, Tyne, Cormorant
- Yacht: Imogene

Leander had as tender to her the depot ship Tyne, and the torpedo boat destroyers: Albatross, Ariel, Banshee, Bat, Bruizer, Chamois, Crane, Cynthia, Desperate, Fawn, Flying Fish, Griffon, Kangaroo, Mallard, Myrmidon, Orwell, Panther, Seal, Stag and Thrasher.

Leander continued in commission as a depot ship for destroyers until December 1919, and was at Scapa Flow during the First World War.

She was sold on 1 July 1920.

== Logbooks in the UK National Archives ==
| Catalogue Number | Start | End | Catalogue Number | Start | End |
|---|---|---|---|---|---|
| ADM 53/14282 | 29 May 1885 | 22 May 1886 | ADM 53/46378 | 1 November 1915 | 30 November 1915 |
| ADM 53/14283 | 23 May 1886 | 7 November 1886 | ADM 53/46379 | 1 December 1915 | 31 December 1915 |
| ADM 53/14284 | 8 November 1886 | 25 April 1887 | ADM 53/46380 | 1 January 1916 | 31 January 1916 |
| ADM 53/14285 | 26 April 1887 | 7 October 1887 | ADM 53/46381 | 1 February 1916 | 29 February 1916 |
| ADM 53/14286 | 8 October 1887 | 20 March 1888 | ADM 53/46382 | 1 March 1916 | 31 March 1916 |
| ADM 53/14287 | 21 March 1888 | 7 March 1889 | ADM 53/46383 | 1 April 1916 | 30 April 1916 |
| ADM 53/14288 | 8 March 1889 | 4 April 1889 | ADM 53/46384 | 1 May 1916 | 31 May 1916 |
| ADM 53/14289 | 5 April 1889 | 4 November 1890 | ADM 53/46385 | 1 June 1916 | 30 June 1916 |
| ADM 53/14290 | 5 November 1890 | 2 May 1892 | ADM 53/46386 | 1 July 1916 | 31 July 1916 |
| ADM 53/14291 | 3 May 1892 | 9 October 1893 | ADM 53/46387 | 1 August 1916 | 31 August 1916 |
| ADM 53/14292 | 10 October 1893 | 1 April 1895 | ADM 53/46388 | 1 September 1916 | 30 September 1916 |
| ADM 53/14293 | 2 April 1895 | 26 November 1895 | ADM 53/46389 | 1 October 1916 | 31 October 1916 |
| In reserve | | | ADM 53/46390 | 1 November 1916 | 30 November 1916 |
| ADM 53/14294 | 8 June 1897 | 9 September 1898 | ADM 53/46391 | 1 December 1916 | 31 December 1916 |
| ADM 53/14295 | 10 September 1898 | 13 December 1899 | ADM 53/46392 | 1 January 1917 | 31 January 1917 |
| ADM 53/14296 | 14 December 1899 | 3 December 1900 | ADM 53/46393 | 1 February 1917 | 28 February 1917 |
| ADM 53/14297 | 4 December 1900 | 15 January 1901 | ADM 53/46394 | 1 March 1917 | 31 March 1917 |
| In reserve/refit | | | ADM 53/46395 | 1 April 1917 | 30 April 1917 |
| ADM 53/22839 | 21 January 1904 | 6 January 1905 | ADM 53/46396 | 1 May 1917 | 31 May 1917 |
| ADM 53/22840 | 7 January 1905 | 18 September 1905 | ADM 53/46397 | 1 June 1917 | 30 June 1917 |
| ADM 53/22841 | 19 September 1905 | 10 September 1906 | ADM 53/46398 | 1 July 1917 | 31 July 1917 |
| ADM 53/22842 | 11 September 1906 | 31 August 1907 | ADM 53/46399 | 1 August 1917 | 31 August 1917 |
| ADM 53/22843 | 1 September 1907 | 22 August 1908 | ADM 53/46400 | 1 September 1917 | 30 September 1917 |
| ADM 53/22844 | 23 August 1908 | 14 August 1909 | ADM 53/46401 | 1 October 1917 | 31 October 1917 |
| ADM 53/22845 | 15 August 1909 | 5 August 1910 | ADM 53/46402 | 1 November 1917 | 30 November 1917 |
| ADM 53/22846 | 6 August 1910 | 26 July 1911 | ADM 53/46403 | 1 December 1917 | 31 December 1917 |
| ADM 53/22847 | 26 July 1911 | 14 July 1912 | ADM 53/46404 | 1 January 1918 | 31 January 1918 |
| ADM 53/22848 | 15 July 1912 | 6 July 1913 | ADM 53/46405 | 1 February 1918 | 28 February 1918 |
| ADM 53/22849 | 1 January 1913 | 31 December 1913 | ADM 53/46406 | 1 March 1918 | 31 March 1918 |
| ADM 53/46368 | 7 July 1913 | 28 June 1914 | ADM 53/46407 | 1 April 1918 | 30 April 1918 |
| ADM 53/46369 | 29 June 1914 | 28 February 1915 | ADM 53/46408 | 1 May 1918 | 31 May 1918 |
| ADM 53/46370 | 1 March 1915 | 31 March 1915 | ADM 53/46409 | 1 June 1918 | 30 June 1918 |
| ADM 53/46371 | 1 April 1915 | 30 April 1915 | ADM 53/46410 | 1 July 1918 | 31 July 1918 |
| ADM 53/46372 | 1 May 1915 | 31 May 1915 | ADM 53/46411 | 1 August 1918 | 31 August 1918 |
| ADM 53/46373 | 1 June 1915 | 30 June 1915 | ADM 53/46412 | 1 September 1918 | 30 September 1918 |
| ADM 53/46374 | 1 July 1915 | 31 July 1915 | ADM 53/46413 | 1 October 1918 | 31 October 1918 |
| ADM 53/46375 | 1 August 1915 | 31 August 1915 | ADM 53/46414 | 1 November 1918 | 30 November 1918 |
| ADM 53/46376 | 1 September 1915 | 30 September 1915 | ADM 53/46415 | 1 December 1918 | 31 December 1918 |
| ADM 53/46377 | 1 October 1915 | 31 October 1915 | ADM 53/46416 | 1 January 1919 | 18 December 1919 |
