= HMS Lively (1900) =

Destroyer of the Royal Navy

History

United Kingdom
- Name: HMS Lively
- Builder: Laird, Son & Co., Birkenhead
- Laid down: 20 June 1899
- Launched: 14 July 1900
- Completed: April 1902
- Commissioned: 13 May 1902
- Fate: Scrapped, 1920

General characteristics
- Class & type: Lively-class destroyer
- Displacement: 385 long tons (391 t)
- Length: 219 ft (67 m)
- Beam: 21.25 ft (6.5 m)
- Draught: 8 ft 7 in (2.6 m)
- Propulsion: Vertical triple-expansion steam engines; Coal-fired Normand boilers; 6,250 hp (4,661 kW)
- Speed: 30 knots (56 km/h; 35 mph)
- Armament: 1 × QF 12-pounder gun; 3 × 6-pounder guns; 3 × 18 in (450 mm) torpedo tubes

HMS Lively was a B-class torpedo boat destroyer of the British Royal Navy. She was built speculatively by Laird, Son & Company, Birkenhead, pre-empting further orders for vessels of this type, and was bought by the navy in 1901.

== Construction ==
On 30 March 1899, the British Admiralty placed an order for two torpedo boat destroyers, Lively and Sprightly, with the Birkenhead shipyard of Laird, Son & Co, as part of a total of twelve destroyers ordered under the 1899–1900 shipbuilding programme. (Note: Some sources (e.g. Conway's All The World's Fighting Ships) suggest that Lively had already been ordered on speculation by the builders, but this is not mentioned in the contract documentation.) These two ships were four-funneled and were similar to those ordered from Laird's under the 1894–1895 programme (the Quail class), the 1895–1896 programme (the Earnest class) and the 1897–1898 programme (Orwell).

Lively was 219 feet 0 inches (66.75 m) long overall and 215 feet 0 inches (65.53 m) between perpendiculars, with a beam of 21 feet 9 inches (6.63 m) and a draught of 8 feet 7 inches (2.62 m). Displacement was 385 long tons (391 t) light and 435 long tons (442 t) full load. Lively was propelled by two triple expansion steam engines, fed by four Normand boilers, rated at 6,250 ihp (4,660 kW) to give the contract speed of 30 knots. Armament was the standard for the 30-knotters, i.e. a QF 12-pounder 12 cwt (3 in (76 mm) calibre) gun on a platform on the ship's conning tower (in practice the platform was also used as the ship's bridge), with a secondary armament of five 6-pounder guns, and two 18-inch (450 mm) torpedo tubes.

Lively was laid down as yard number 639 on 20 June 1899, launched on 14 July 1900 and completed in April 1902.

== Operational history ==
HMS Lively was commissioned at Devonport by Lieutenant James Hawksley on 13 May 1902, with the crew of HMS Ostrich, taking that ship's place in the Instructional flotilla. She took part in the fleet review held at Spithead on 16 August 1902 for the coronation of King Edward VII, and afterwards served as escort to the royal yacht Victoria and Albert during the King's August 1902 cruise along the British Isles. She was back in the instructional flotilla the following month. Lieutenant Ernest Edward Parker was appointed in command on 19 October 1902.

On 30 August 1912 the Admiralty directed all destroyers were to be grouped into classes designated by letters based on contract speed and appearance. "30 knotter" vessels with 4 funnels, were classified by the Admiralty as the B-class. (Note: the 3-funnelled, "30 knotters" became the C-class and the 2-funnelled ships the D-class) and a four-funneled 30-knotter destroyer, Lively was assigned to the B-class. In February 1913, Lively was part of the 7th Destroyer Flotilla, a patrol flotilla based at Devonport. On 1 June 1913, Lively was in collision with the destroyer Violet off Felixstowe. Lively remained part of the 7th Flotilla on the eve of the First World War in July 1914.

At the outbreak of war, the 7th Flotilla was redeployed to the Humber River for operations off the East coast of Britain. Duties of the Flotilla were to prevent enemy ships from carrying out minelaying or torpedo attacks in the approaches to ports on the East coast, and to prevent raids by enemy ships. On 3 November 1914, Lively was taking part in a routine patrol off the Norfolk coast near the port of Great Yarmouth, with the destroyer Leopard, while the torpedo gunboat Halcyon was nearby searching for mines. At about 07:00 hr Halcyon spotted several large warships emerging from the early morning mist, which opened fire on Halcyon when she challenged them. The hostile ships were a force of German battlecruisers and cruisers carrying out a raid on Yarmouth. Lively rushed up and laid a smokescreen to protect Halcyon, which despite being the target of heavy fire from the battlecruiser Seydlitz received only light damage, while Lively and Leopard were unharmed. The Germans retired after firing a few shells in the direction of Yarmouth, and while the two destroyers attempted to pursue the German force, they could not keep pace.

On 8 November 1914, Lively was one of 12 destroyers that were transferred from the 7th Flotilla to reinforce the local defences of the Grand Fleet's base at Scapa Flow in Orkney. She remained at Scapa Flow until March 1918, and was one of the last three destroyers assigned to local defence of Scapa Flow, but by April had transferred to the Irish Sea Flotilla, which by July had acquired the more aggressive name of Irish Sea Hunting Flotilla. On 10 October 1918, RMS Leinster, a steamer operating as a mailship and ferry between Kingstown (now Dún Laoghaire), Ireland and Holyhead, Anglesey, was torpedoed and sunk by the German submarine UB-123. Lively, on patrol off the Skerries, County Dublin, responded to the news of Leinster's sinking, and along with the destroyers Mallard and Seal set out to rescue survivors. Lively picked up 127 survivors, while Seal rescued 51 and Mallard 20, but as many as 529 died.

Lively was sold for scrap to Castle of Plymouth on 1 July 1920.

== Pennant numbers ==
Pennant number	From	To
D91	1914	September 1915
D83	September 1915	January 1918
D53	January 1918	Retirement

== Bibliography ==
- Chesneau, Roger & Kolesnik, Eugene M., eds. (1979). Conway's All The World's Fighting Ships 1860–1905. London: Conway Maritime Press. ISBN 0-85177-133-5.
- Colledge, J. J.; Warlow, Ben (2006) [1969]. Ships of the Royal Navy: The Complete Record of All Fighting Ships of the Royal Navy from the 15th Century to the Present (3rd Rev ed.). London: Chatham Publishing. ISBN 978-1-86176-281-8. OCLC 67375475.
- Corbett, Julian S. (1920). History of the Great War: Naval Operations: Vol. I: To the Battle of the Falklands December 1914. London: Longmans, Green and Co.
- Dittmar, F. J.; Colledge, J. J. (1972). British Warships 1914–1919. Allan. ISBN 0-7110-0380-7.
- Friedman, Norman (2009). British Destroyers: From Earliest Days to the Second World War. Barnsley, UK: Seaforth Publishing. ISBN 978-1-84832-049-9.
- Gardiner, Robert & Gray, Randal, eds. (1985). Conway's All The World's Fighting Ships 1906–1921. London: Conway Maritime Press. ISBN 0-85177-245-5.
- Lecane, Philip (2005). Torpedoed! The R.M.S Leinster Disaster. Penzance, UK. ISBN 1-904381-29-4.
- Lyon, David (2001). The First Destroyers. London: Caxton Editions. ISBN 1-84067-3648.
- Manning, T. D. (1961). The British Destroyer. London: Putnam & Co. OCLC 6470051.
- Massie, Robert K. (2007). Castles of Steel: Britain, Germany and the Winning of the Great War at Sea. London: Vintage Books. ISBN 978-0-099-52378-9.
- March, Edgar J. (1966). British Destroyers: A History of Development, 1892–1953; Drawn by Admiralty Permission From Official Records & Returns, Ships' Covers & Building Plans. London: Seeley Service. OCLC 164893555.
- Monograph No. 7: The Patrol Flotillas at the Commencement of the War (PDF). Naval Staff Monographs (Historical). Vol. III. The Naval Staff, Training and Staff Duties Division. 1921. pp. 71–107.
