= HMS Locust =

At least three ships of the British Royal Navy have been named HMS Locust, for the insect.

- HMS Locust (1801) was a 14-gun brig, launched at Deptford in 1801, that served in the Channel and was sold in 1814.
- HMS Locust (1840) was a paddle-steamer Lizard-class gunvessel, launched in 1840 and sold in 1895.
- HMS Locust (1896) was an Earnest-class destroyer (later grouped into the 30-knot, 4-funnel B-class grouping). She was completed in 1896 and scrapped in 1919.
- HMS Locust (T28) was a Dragonfly-class river gunboat, launched in 1939 and broken up in 1968.
