= HMS Wolf (1897) =

Destroyer of the Royal Navy

History

United Kingdom
- Name: HMS Wolf
- Ordered: 9 January 1896
- Builder: Laird, Son & Co., Birkenhead
- Laid down: 12 November 1896
- Launched: 2 June 1897
- Completed: July 1898
- Decommissioned: 1921
- Fate: Scrapped, 1921

General characteristics
- Class & type: Earnest-class destroyer
- Displacement: 395 long tons (401 t)
- Length: 210 ft (64 m)
- Beam: 21.5 ft (6.6 m)
- Draught: 9.75 ft (3.0 m)
- Propulsion: vertical triple-expansion steam engines; Coal-fired Normand boilers; 6,300 hp (4,698 kW)
- Speed: 30 knots (56 km/h; 35 mph)
- Complement: 63
- Armament: 1 × QF 12-pounder gun; 2 × 18 inch (450 mm) torpedo tubes

HMS Wolf was a B-class torpedo boat destroyer of the British Royal Navy. She was completed by Laird, Son & Company, Birkenhead in 1897.

== Construction ==
Wolf (Note: Wolf's original name was Squirrel but she was renamed before acceptance.) was ordered on 9 January 1896 as the last of six 30-knotter destroyers programmed to be built by Lairds under the 1895–1896 programme. These followed on from four very similar destroyers ordered from Lairds as part of the 1894–1895 programme. Like the other Laird-built 30-knotters, Wolf was propelled by two triple expansion steam engines, fed by four Normand boilers, rated at 6,300 ihp (4,700 kW), and was fitted with four funnels. Armament was the standard for the 30-knotters, i.e. a QF 12 pounder 12 cwt (3 in (76 mm) calibre) gun on a platform on the ship's conning tower (in practice the platform was also used as the ship's bridge), with a secondary armament of five 6-pounder guns, and two 18 inch (450 mm) torpedo tubes.

Wolf was laid down on 12 November 1896 and launched on 2 June 1897. On 9 March 1898, she carried out final trials, reaching an average speed of 31.2 kn (35.9 mph; 57.8 km/h) over the measured mile. Wolf commissioned in July 1898.

== Service ==
HMS Wolf served, under the command of Lieutenant and Commander B. Long, as part of the Devonport Destroyer Instructional Flotilla until she was paid off at Devonport on 2 September 1901, taking part in the 1901 Naval Manoeuvres.

Following the loss of the turbine-powered destroyer HMS Cobra, which broke in two and sank while on its delivery voyage on 19 September 1901, the Admiralty set up a committee to investigate the strength and seaworthiness of its destroyers. As part of these investigations, a number of full-scale tests were carried out on Wolf to determine the stresses to which destroyers could be exposed to at sea. Wolf was fitted with strain gauges and subject to hogging and sagging tests in dry dock at Portsmouth. Following this, Wolf, still fitted with strain gauges, was sent to sea to look for bad weather. The investigation indicated that the destroyers built to Admiralty design requirements had adequate strength.

On 30 August 1912 the Admiralty directed all destroyers were to be grouped into classes designated by letters based on contract speed and appearance. As a four-funneled 30-knotter destroyer, Wolf was assigned to the B Class.

Wolf was a member of the Fifth Destroyer Flotilla, based at Devonport, in 1910, and of the Seventh Destroyer Flotilla, also based at Devonport, in 1913. On the outbreak of the First World War in August 1914, Wolf remained part of the Seventh Destroyer Flotilla, which transferred to the Humber on the East coast of England.

Wolf remained part of the Seventh Flotilla in June 1917, when she was undergoing refit. By September 1917, Wolf had transferred to the Northern Division of the Coast of Ireland Station, headquartered at Buncrana, carrying out patrols in the North Channel between Scotland and the north of Ireland. By April 1918, she had landed her torpedo tubes and the aft gun to accommodate an anti-submarine armament of 18 depth charges and two depth charge throwers. Wolf remained operating on the North Channel Patrol until the end of the war.

Wolf was sold for scrap on 1 July 1921 to S. Castle of Plymouth.

== Pennant numbers ==
Pennant number	From	To
D98	1914	September 1915
D95	September 1915	January 1918
D97	January 1918	Retirement

== Bibliography ==
- Brassey, T.A. (1902). The Naval Annual 1902. Portsmouth, UK: J. Griffin and Co.
- Chesneau, Roger & Kolesnik, Eugene M., eds. (1979). Conway's All The World's Fighting Ships 1860–1905. London: Conway Maritime Press. ISBN 0-85177-133-5.
- Colledge, J. J.; Warlow, Ben (2006) [1969]. Ships of the Royal Navy: The Complete Record of All Fighting Ships of the Royal Navy from the 15th Century to the Present (3rd Rev ed.). London: Chatham Publishing. ISBN 978-1-86176-281-8. OCLC 67375475.
- Dittmar, F.J.; Colledge, J.J. (1972). British Warships 1914–1919. Shepperton, UK: Ian Allan. ISBN 0-7110-0380-7.
- Friedman, Norman (2009). British Destroyers: From Earliest Days to the Second World War. Barnsley, UK: Seaforth Publishing. ISBN 978-1-84832-049-9.
- Gardiner, Robert & Gray, Randal, eds. (1985). Conway's All The World's Fighting Ships 1906–1921. London: Conway Maritime Press. ISBN 0-85177-245-5.
- Hepper, David; Conway, Michael S. (June 2021). "Question 18/57". Warship International. LVIII (2): 100–101. ISSN 0043-0374.
- Lyon, David (2001) [1996]. The First Destroyers. London: Caxton Editions. ISBN 1-84067-3648.
- Manning, T. D. (1961). The British Destroyer. London: Putnam & Co. OCLC 6470051.
- March, Edgar J. (1966). British Destroyers: A History of Development, 1892–1953; Drawn by Admiralty Permission From Official Records & Returns, Ships' Covers & Building Plans. London: Seeley Service. OCLC 164893555.
