= HMS Orwell (1898) =

Destroyer of the Royal Navy

History

United Kingdom
- Name: HMS Orwell
- Builder: Laird, Son & Co., Birkenhead
- Laid down: 9 November 1897
- Launched: 29 September 1898
- Completed: January 1900
- Fate: Scrapped, 1922

General characteristics
- Class & type: B-class torpedo boat destroyer
- Displacement: 360 long tons (366 t)
- Length: 216.25 ft (65.91 m)
- Beam: 21.5 ft (6.6 m)
- Draught: 9 ft 7 in (2.9 m)
- Propulsion: vertical triple-expansion steam engines; Coal-fired Normand boilers; 6,300 hp (4,698 kW)
- Speed: 30 knots (56 km/h; 35 mph)
- Complement: 63
- Armament: 1 × QF 12-pounder gun; 2 × 18 inch (450 mm) torpedo tubes

HMS Orwell was a B-class torpedo boat destroyer of the British Royal Navy. She was built by Laird, Son & Company, and served from 1900 until 1920.

== Construction and design ==
As part of the 1897–1898 construction programme for the Royal Navy, the British Admiralty placed an order with Laird, Son & Company of Birkenhead for a single "thirty-knotter" destroyer. Laird's design was based on the Earnest-class destroyer of six destroyers ordered under the 1895–1896 programme, which were in turn closely based on Laird's Quail-class destroyer ordered under the 1894–1895 programme.

Orwell had an overall length of 216 feet 9 inches (66.07 m), with a beam of 21 feet 6 inches (6.55 m) and a draught of 9 feet 7 inches (2.92 m). The ship was powered by two triple expansion steam engines, fed by four Normand boilers, rated at 6,300 ihp (4,700 kW) and was fitted with four funnels, giving a speed of 30 knots. Displacement was 360 long tons (366 t) light and 410 long tons (417 t) full load.

Armament was as normal for the "thirty-knotters", with a QF 12 pounder 12 cwt (3 in (76 mm) calibre) gun on a platform on the ship's conning tower (in practice the platform was also used as the ship's bridge), with a secondary armament of five 6-pounder guns, and two 18 inch (450 mm) torpedo tubes.

HMS Orwell was laid down on 9 November 1897 and launched on 29 September 1898.

== Service ==
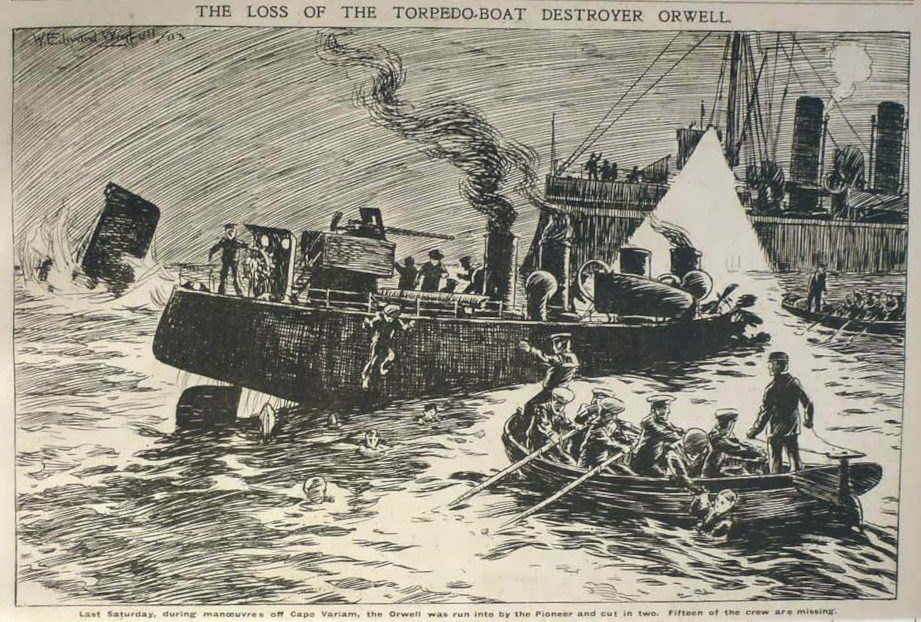
The collision of the Torpedo Boat Destroyer Orwell off Cape Varlam

Orwell was completed in January 1900, joining the Mediterranean Squadron in April that year, under the command of Commander Ralph Hudleston. In September 1902 she visited Nauplia with other ships of the squadron. Early the following year she took part in a three-weeks cruise with other ships of her squadron in the Greek islands around Corfu. While there, Orwell collided with the cruiser HMS Pioneer on 30 January 1903, during night exercises near Corfu. Orwell's bow was cut off in the collision with the loss of 15 of her crew.

Orwell returned to the United Kingdom in 1906, remaining in home waters for the rest of her Royal Navy career. In 1910, Orwell was part of the Fifth Destroyer Flotilla at Devonport, supported by the destroyer depot ship Leander, and was still a part of the same flotilla in 1912.

On 30 August 1912 the Admiralty directed all destroyers were to be grouped into classes designated by letters based on appearance. to provide some system to the naming of HM destroyers. "30 knotter" vessels with 4 funnels, were classified by the Admiralty as the B-class, the 3-funnelled, "30 knotters" became the C-class and the 2-funnelled ships the D-class). As a four-funneled ship, Orwell was listed as a B-class destroyer on 1 October 1913. By 1913, she was part as the Seventh Destroyer Flotilla, still based at Devonport, one of four patrol flotillas equipped with older destroyers and torpedo boats.

On the outbreak of the First World War, the Seventh Destroyer Flotilla was transferred to the East coast of the United Kingdom. Late in 1914, Orwell was transferred to Scapa Flow, where she carried out local patrol and escort duties. By March 1918, Orwell was one of only three destroyers assigned to local defence of Scapa, but by June that year she had been transferred to the Irish Sea Flotilla.

Orwell was sold for scrap to S Castle of Plymouth on 1 July 1920 and was broken up in October 1922.

== Bibliography ==
- Chesneau, Roger & Kolesnik, Eugene M., eds. (1979). Conway's All The World's Fighting Ships 1860–1905. London: Conway Maritime Press. ISBN 0-85177-133-5.
- Colledge, J. J.; Warlow, Ben (2006) [1969]. Ships of the Royal Navy: The Complete Record of All Fighting Ships of the Royal Navy from the 15th Century to the Present (3rd Rev ed.). London: Chatham Publishing. ISBN 978-1-86176-281-8. OCLC 67375475.
- Dittmar, F.J.; Colledge, J.J. (1972). British Warships 1914–1919. Shepperton, UK: Ian Allan. ISBN 0-7110-0380-7.
- Friedman, Norman (2009). British Destroyers: From Earliest Days to the Second World War. Barnsley, UK: Seaforth Publishing. ISBN 978-1-84832-049-9.
- Gardiner, Robert & Gray, Randal, eds. (1985). Conway's All The World's Fighting Ships 1906–1921. London: Conway Maritime Press. ISBN 0-85177-245-5.
- Lyon, David (2001) [1996]. The First Destroyers. London: Caxton Editions. ISBN 1-84067-3648.
- Manning, T. D. (1961). The British Destroyer. London: Putnam & Co. OCLC 6470051.
- March, Edgar J. (1966). British Destroyers: A History of Development, 1892–1953; Drawn by Admiralty Permission From Official Records & Returns, Ships' Covers & Building Plans. London: Seeley Service. OCLC 164893555.
