= HMS Panther (1897) =

Destroyer of the Royal Navy

History

United Kingdom
- Name: HMS Panther
- Builder: Laird, Son & Co., Birkenhead
- Laid down: 19 May 1896
- Launched: 21 January 1897
- Completed: January 1898
- Fate: Scrapped, 1920

General characteristics
- Class & type: Earnest-class destroyer
- Displacement: 395 long tons (401 t)
- Length: 210 ft (64 m)
- Beam: 21.5 ft (6.6 m)
- Draught: 9.75 ft (3.0 m)
- Propulsion: vertical triple-expansion steam engines; Coal-fired Normand boilers; 6,300 hp (4,698 kW)
- Speed: 30 knots (56 km/h; 35 mph)
- Complement: 63
- Armament: 1 × QF 12-pounder gun; 2 × 18 inch (450 mm) torpedo tubes

HMS Panther was a B-class torpedo boat destroyer of the British Royal Navy. She was completed by Laird, Son & Company, Birkenhead, in 1897.

== Design and construction ==
Panther was ordered on 9 January 1896 as one of six 30-knotter destroyers programmed to be built by Lairds under the 1895–1896 shipbuilding programme for the Royal Navy. These followed on from four very similar destroyers ordered from Lairds as part of the 1894–1895 programme.

Panther was 218 feet (66.45 m) long overall and 213 feet (64.92 m) between perpendiculars, with a beam of 21 feet 6 inches (6.55 m) and a draught of 9 feet 9 inches (2.97 m). Displacement was 355 long tons (361 t) light and 415 long tons (422 t) full load. Like the other Laird-built 30-knotters, Locust was propelled by two triple expansion steam engines, fed by four Normand boilers, rated at 6,300 ihp (4,700 kW), and was fitted with four funnels.

Armament was the standard for the 30-knotters, i.e. a QF 12 pounder 12 cwt (3 in (76 mm) calibre) gun on a platform on the ship's conning tower (in practice the platform was also used as the ship's bridge), with a secondary armament of five 6-pounder guns, and two 18-inch (450 mm) torpedo tubes. The ship had a crew of 63 officers and men.

Panther was laid down at Laird's Birkenhead shipyard as Yard number 624 on 19 May 1896 and was launched on 21 January 1897. She reached 30.14 knots (55.82 km/h; 34.68 mph) during sea trials. and was completed in January 1898.

== Service history ==
In July–August 1900, Panther took part in that year's Royal Navy Annual Manoeuvres. On 20 April 1901 she was commissioned at Devonport by Lieutenant and Commander A. K. Macrorie to take the place of HMS Osprey in the dockyard's instructional flotilla. In July–August 1901, she again took part in the annual manoeuvres. In early December 1901 Commander Cecil Lambert was appointed in command, as she was recommissioned as tender to the battleship Illustrious on the Mediterranean station. Lambert was moved to another ship the following month, however, and when she left Devonport for Malta in January 1902, Lieutenant and Commander Lancelot Napier Turton was in command. She visited Lemnos in August 1902, and in early January 1903 took part in a three-weeks cruise with other ships of the squadron in the Greek islands around Corfu. On 27 October 1904, Panther collided with the destroyer Bat. Both destroyers were damaged and had to return to Malta for repair. Panther returned to British waters in 1906.

In August 1906, Panther replaced Orwell in the 2nd Destroyer Flotilla when Orwell was refitted. In August 1907,Panther, now a member of the 4th Destroyer Flotilla, was (along with fellow flotilla members Cherwell and Colne) having defects rectified at Sheerness Dockyard. By December 1908, Panther was part of the Eastern Group of destroyers, based at Harwich. She started a refit at Sheerness that month, which was completed by March, when she returned to Harwich to rejoin what had been renamed the 1st Destroyer Flotilla, although she was due to be replaced by the Tribal-class destroyer Saracen. This happened at the end of June that year, with Panther being the last "Thirty-Knotter" in service with the 1st Flotilla. In August 1910, Panther, now part of the Nore flotilla, was refitted at Chatham Dockyard. In October 1911, Panther, now a member of the 5th Destroyer Flotilla, based at Devonport and which consisted of destroyers in commission with nucleus crews, was docked for repair of a propeller damaged in a collision with Yarmouth Pier.

On 30 August 1912 the Admiralty directed all destroyers were to be grouped into classes designated by letters based on contract speed and appearance. As a four-funneled 30-knotter destroyer, Panther was assigned to the B class. In 1912, older destroyers were organised into Patrol Flotillas, with Panther being part of the 7th Flotilla, based at Devonport, in March 1913.

In July 1914, shortly before the Irish Volunteers carried out the Howth gun-running, the Panther was sent to Dublin Bay to guard against such a measure. Bulmer Hobson told a colleague "in strict confidence" that an arms landing was planned for Waterford, in the south of the country, hoping that the news would leak to the authorities. The Panther duly sailed south, and the way was left clear for the operation at Howth to proceed. Panther remained part of the 7th Flotilla on the eve of the First World War in July 1914.

At the outbreak of war, the 7th Flotilla was redeployed to the Humber River for operations off the East coast of Britain. Duties of the flotilla were to prevent enemy ships from carrying out minelaying or torpedo attacks in the approaches to ports on the East coast, and to prevent raids by enemy ships. Panther remained part of the 7th Flotilla in August 1917, but in September that year was listed as part of the local defence flotilla for the Nore. Panther was still listed as part of the Nore local defence Flotilla at the start of March 1918, but joined the 6th Destroyer Flotilla, part of the Dover Patrol on 23 March 1918. Panther remained part of the 6th Destroyer Flotilla in November 1918 and was under repair at the end of the war on 11 November that month.

Panther was sold for scrap on 7 June 1920.

== Pennant numbers ==
Pennant number	From	To
D69	1914	September 1915
D87	September 1915	January 1918
D67	January 1918	

== Bibliography ==
- Bacon, Reginald (1918). The Dover Patrol 1915–1917. Vol. II. London: Hutchinson & Son.
- Brassey, T. A., ed. (1898). The Naval Annual 1898. Portsmouth, UK: J Griffin and Co.
- Brassey, T. A., ed. (1902). The Naval Annual 1902. Portsmouth, UK: J. Griffin and Co.
- Chesneau, Roger & Kolesnik, Eugene M., eds. (1979). Conway's All The World's Fighting Ships 1860–1905. London: Conway Maritime Press. ISBN 0-85177-133-5.
- Colledge, J. J.; Warlow, Ben (2006) [1969]. Ships of the Royal Navy: The Complete Record of All Fighting Ships of the Royal Navy from the 15th Century to the Present (3rd Rev ed.). London: Chatham Publishing. ISBN 978-1-86176-281-8. OCLC 67375475.
- Corbett, Julian S. (1920). History of the Great War: Naval Operations: Vol. I: To the Battle of the Falklands December 1914. London: Longmans, Green and Co.
- Dittmar, F.J.; Colledge, J.J. (1972). British Warships 1914–1919. Shepperton, UK: Ian Allan. ISBN 0-7110-0380-7.
- Friedman, Norman (2009). British Destroyers: From Earliest Days to the Second World War. Barnsley, UK: Seaforth Publishing. ISBN 978-1-84832-049-9.
- Gardiner, Robert & Gray, Randal, eds. (1985). Conway's All The World's Fighting Ships 1906–1921. London: Conway Maritime Press. ISBN 0-85177-245-5.
- Hepper, David; Conway, Michael S. (June 2021). "Question 18/57". Warship International. LVIII (2): 100–101. ISSN 0043-0374.
- Leyland, John, ed. (1901). The Naval Annual 1901. Portsmouth, UK: J Griffin and Co.
- Lyon, David (2001) [1996]. The First Destroyers. London: Caxton Editions. ISBN 1-84067-3648.
- Manning, T. D. (1961). The British Destroyer. London: Putnam & Co. OCLC 6470051.
- March, Edgar J. (1966). British Destroyers: A History of Development, 1892–1953; Drawn by Admiralty Permission From Official Records & Returns, Ships' Covers & Building Plans. London: Seeley Service. OCLC 164893555.
- Martin, F. X., ed. (1963). The Irish Volunteers 1913–1915. Dublin: James Duffy & Co. OCLC 219744035.
- Monograph No. 7: The Patrol Flotillas at the Commencement of the War (PDF). Naval Staff Monographs (Historical). Vol. III. The Naval Staff, Training and Staff Duties Division. 1921. pp. 71–107.
