= HMS Express (1896) =

Destroyer of the Royal Navy

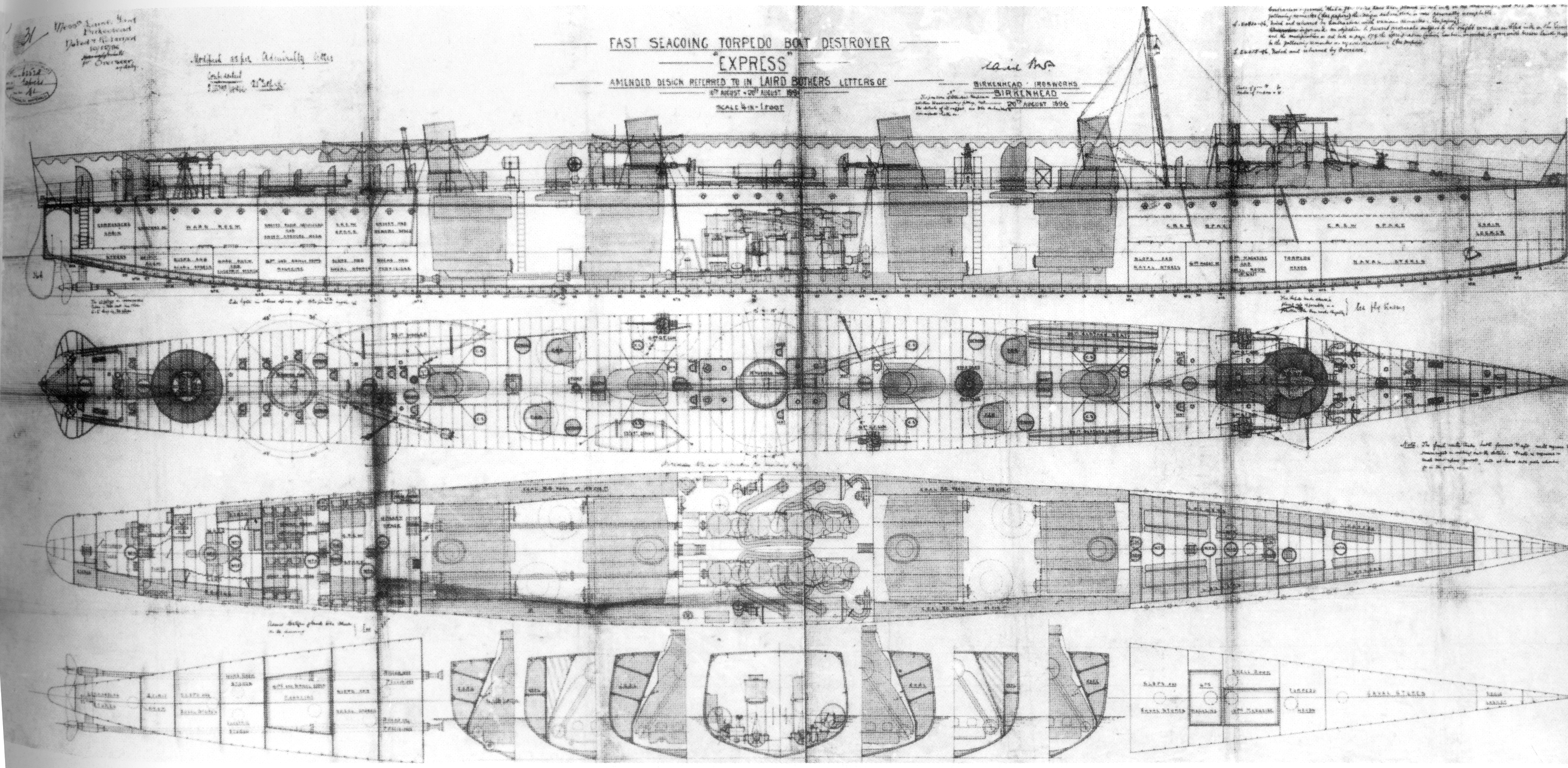
- Laird plans for Express

History

United Kingdom
- Name: HMS Express
- Builder: Laird, Son & Co., Birkenhead
- Laid down: 1 December 1896
- Launched: 11 December 1897
- Completed: February 1902
- Fate: Scrapped, 1921

General characteristics
- Type: Torpedo boat destroyer
- Displacement: 465 long tons (472 t)
- Length: 239.25 ft (72.9 m)
- Beam: 23.5 ft (7.2 m)
- Draught: 10.25 ft (3.1 m)
- Propulsion: vertical triple-expansion steam engines; Coal-fired Normand boilers; 9,250 hp (6,898 kW)
- Speed: 31 knots (57 km/h; 36 mph)
- Complement: 74
- Armament: 1 × QF 12-pounder (76 mm) gun; 5 × 6-pounder guns; 2 × 18-inch (450 mm) torpedo tubes

HMS Express was a B-class torpedo boat destroyer of the British Royal Navy. She was completed by Laird, Son & Company, Birkenhead, in 1896. Like many contemporary British destroyers, she was a "builder's special", designed to Admiralty specifications but built to the builder's own design.

== Design and construction ==
The 1896–1897 shipbuilding programme of the British Admiralty included orders for 20 torpedo boat destroyers. Of these, 17 were "thirty-knotters", as ordered under the 1894–1895 and 1895–1896 programmes, which had a contract speed of 30 knots (56 km/h; 35 mph). The remaining three destroyers, ordered from Laird (Express), J & G Thomson (Arab) and Thornycroft (Albatross) were "specials", which were required to reach higher speeds. While Thomson's and Thornycroft's destroyers had contract speeds of 32 knots (59 km/h; 37 mph), Laird's design was required to reach a speed of 33 knots (61 km/h; 38 mph).

Express was 239 feet 6 inches (73.00 m) long overall, with a beam of 23 feet 6 inches (7.16 m) and a draught of 14 feet 8 inches (4.47 m). Displacement was 465 long tons (472 t) light and 540 long tons (550 t) full load. Four coal-fired Normand boilers fed steam at 240 pounds per square inch (1,700 kPa) to two triple expansion engines rated at 9,250 indicated horsepower (6,900 kW). Four evenly spaced funnels were fitted. Up to 140 long tons (140 t) of coal were carried, sufficient to give an endurance of 1,470 nautical miles (2,720 km; 1,690 mi) at 11 knots (20 km/h; 13 mph).

Express carried the specified armament for the thirty-knotters of a QF 12 pounder 12 cwt (3 in (76 mm) calibre) gun on a platform on the ship's conning tower (in practice the platform was also used as the ship's bridge), with a secondary armament of five 6-pounder guns, and two 18-inch (450 mm) torpedo tubes. While the ship carried the same armament as normal thirty-knotter destroyers, the more powerful engines needed more coal and hence more stokers were needed to feed the coal to the engines, with Express' crew being 73 officers and men, compared to 63 for standard Laird-built thirty-knotters.

Express was laid down on at Laird's Birkenhead shipyard on 1 December 1896 as Yard number 629, and was launched on 11 December 1897. Express was subject to an extensive series of trials over an 18-month period in an attempt to reach the contracted speed of 33 knots. Although Lairds managed to drive the ship's machinery to up to 10,012 indicated horsepower (7,466 kW), well in excess of the rated 9,250 indicated horsepower (6,900 kW), and experimented with different propellers, Express failed to reach the required speeds. It was eventually decided by the Admiralty to accept Express despite this failure in recognition of Laird's great efforts and expense in trying to reach the over-optimistic requirement, and the fact that forcing the ship's machinery further was likely to cause excessive wear. Express was delivered to Devonport for further trials in August 1902, and eventually commissioned later that year.

In 1913 Express, along with all other surviving "30 knotter" vessels with 4 funnels, were classified by the Admiralty as the B-class to provide some system to the naming of HM destroyers (at the same time, the 3-funnelled, "30 knotters" became the C-class and the 2-funnelled ships the D-class).

== Service ==
Express served in British waters throughout her career. Express collided with the stores ship RFA Aquarius in December 1907 at Lamlash, Isle of Arran, Scotland. In 1909 Express was part of the Fifth Destroyer Flotilla, based at Devonport, and was still part of that Flotilla in 1912. On 30 August 1912 the Admiralty directed all destroyers were to be grouped into classes designated by letters based on contract speed and appearance. Four-funneled, 30-knotter destroyers were grouped as the B Class, and Express was assigned to this class. In 1912, it was decided to allocate older destroyers to dedicated Patrol Flotillas, with Express being allocated to the Seventh Flotilla, based at Devonport. On 8 May 1913, she struck the British passenger-cargo ship Leicester in the dock at Grimsby and damaged her. Express remained part of the Seventh Flotilla until November 1913, but by January 1914 had transferred to the Eighth Destroyer Flotilla, another patrol flotilla based at Chatham.

Express remained part of the Eighth Flotilla at the outbreak of the First World War, with the Flotilla transferring to the Forth Estuary. Express, still part of the Eighth Flotilla, was undergoing a long refit in January 1917, but in June 1917 she transferred to the East Coast Convoy Flotilla, based on the Humber, which became part of the Seventh Destroyer Flotilla in July. By December that year, Express had moved to the Northern Division of the Coast of Ireland Station, based at Larne and carrying out patrols in the North Channel between Scotland and the North of Ireland. Express remained operating on the North Channel Patrol until the end of the war.

Express was on the Sale List in December 1919, and was sold for scrapping to G Clarkson of Whitby on 17 March 1920.

== Pennant numbers ==
Pennant number	From	To
D84	1914	September 1915
D80	September 1915	January 1918
D34	January 1918	Retirement

== Bibliography ==
- Chesneau, Roger & Kolesnik, Eugene M., eds. (1979). Conway's All The World's Fighting Ships 1860–1905. London: Conway Maritime Press. ISBN 0-85177-133-5.
- Colledge, J. J.; Warlow, Ben (2006) [1969]. Ships of the Royal Navy: The Complete Record of All Fighting Ships of the Royal Navy from the 15th Century to the Present (3rd Rev ed.). London: Chatham Publishing. ISBN 978-1-86176-281-8. OCLC 67375475.
- Dittmar, F.J.; Colledge, J.J. (1972). British Warships 1914–1919. Shepperton, UK: Ian Allan. ISBN 0-7110-0380-7.
- Friedman, Norman (2009). British Destroyers: From Earliest Days to the Second World War. Barnsley, UK: Seaforth Publishing. ISBN 978-1-84832-049-9.
- Gardiner, Robert & Gray, Randal, eds. (1985). Conway's All The World's Fighting Ships 1906–1921. London: Conway Maritime Press. ISBN 0-85177-245-5.
- Lyon, David (2001) [1996]. The First Destroyers. London: Caxton Editions. ISBN 1-84067-3648.
- Manning, T. D. (1961). The British Destroyer. London: Putnam & Co. OCLC 6470051.
- March, Edgar J. (1966). British Destroyers: A History of Development, 1892–1953; Drawn by Admiralty Permission From Official Records & Returns, Ships' Covers & Building Plans. London: Seeley Service. OCLC 164893555.
