= HMS Griffon (1896) =

Destroyer of the Royal Navy

History

United Kingdom
- Name: HMS Griffon
- Builder: Laird, Son & Co., Birkenhead
- Laid down: 7 March 1896
- Launched: 21 November 1896
- Completed: November 1897
- Fate: Scrapped, 1920

General characteristics
- Class & type: Earnest-class destroyer
- Displacement: 395 long tons (401 t)
- Length: 210 ft (64 m)
- Beam: 21.5 ft (6.6 m)
- Draught: 9.75 ft (3.0 m)
- Propulsion: vertical triple-expansion steam engines; Coal-fired Normand boilers; 6,300 hp (4,698 kW)
- Speed: 30 knots (56 km/h; 35 mph)
- Complement: 63
- Armament: 1 × QF 12-pounder gun; 2 × 18 inch (450 mm) torpedo tubes

HMS Griffon was a B-class torpedo boat destroyer of the British Royal Navy. She was completed by Laird, Son & Company, Birkenhead, in 1896.

== Construction ==
Griffon was ordered on 9 January 1896 as one of six 30-knotter destroyers programmed to be built by Lairds under the 1895–1896 programme. These followed on from four very similar destroyers ordered from Lairds as part of the 1894–1895 programme.

Griffon was 218 ft 0 in (66.45 m) long overall and 213 ft 0 in (64.92 m) between perpendiculars, with a beam of 21 ft 6 in (6.55 m) and a draught of 9 ft 6 in (2.90 m). Displacement was 355 long tons (361 t) light and 415 long tons (422 t) deep load. Like the other Laird-built 30-knotters, Griffon was propelled by two triple expansion steam engines, fed by four Normand boilers, rated at 6,300 ihp (4,700 kW), and was fitted with four funnels.

Armament was the standard for the 30-knotters, i.e. a QF 12 pounder 12 cwt (3 in (76 mm) calibre) gun on a platform on the ship's conning tower (in practice the platform was also used as the ship's bridge), with a secondary armament of five 6-pounder guns, and two 18 inch (450 mm) torpedo tubes.

Griffon was laid down as Yard number 622 on 7 March 1896 and launched on 21 November that year. She reached a speed of 30.11 kn (34.65 mph; 55.76 km/h) during sea trials, and was completed in November 1897.

== Service ==
Griffon departed for the Mediterranean Squadron, together with sister ship Earnest, in September 1898, and was still serving in the Mediterranean in January 1900. She visited Greek waters in September 1902, and Lieutenant Harry Charles John Roberts West was appointed in command when she was back at Malta in late October 1902. In early January 1903 she took part in a three-weeks cruise with other ships of her squadron in the Greek islands around Corfu. Griffon returned to British waters in 1906. In early 1910, Griffon, part of the Nore Destroyer Flotilla, was refitted at Chatham Dockyard.

On 30 August 1912 the Admiralty directed all destroyers were to be grouped into classes designated by letters based on contract speed and appearance. As a four-funneled 30-knotter destroyer, Griffon was assigned to the B Class. In 1912, older destroyers were transferred to patrol flotillas, with Griffon forming part of the Seventh Flotilla, based at Devonport, by March 1913. Griffon remained part of the Seventh Flotilla in June 1914. Griffon entered refit at Pembroke Dockyard in July 1914.

In January 1915, Griffon was based at Scapa Flow, as one of a force of 29 destroyers used for local patrols of this key anchorage, the base for the Grand Fleet. Griffon remained attached to the Grand Fleet at Scapa Flow in February 1918, but by March 1918 had transferred to the Irish Sea Flotilla. On 19 May 1918, she was one of several warships dispatched to investigate a sighting report of a periscope by an airship off the Lleyn Peninsula in North Wales. No submarine was destroyed in the resulting operations. Griffon was based at Holyhead on Anglesey for operations in the Irish sea at the end of the war.

== Disposal ==
In January 1919, Griffon was listed as being temporarily based at Devonport Naval Base. In April 1920, she was listed as for sale, and she was sold for scrap to Castle of Plymouth on 1 July 1920.

== Pennant numbers ==
Pennant number	From	To
D39	1914	September 1915
D81	September 1915	January 1918
D45	January 1918	Retirement

== Bibliography ==
- Brassey, T. A., ed. (1898). The Naval Annual 1898. Portsmouth, UK: J Griffin and Co.
- Chesneau, Roger & Kolesnik, Eugene M., eds. (1979). Conway's All The World's Fighting Ships 1860–1905. London: Conway Maritime Press. ISBN 0-85177-133-5.
- Colledge, J. J.; Warlow, Ben (2006) [1969]. Ships of the Royal Navy: The Complete Record of All Fighting Ships of the Royal Navy from the 15th Century to the Present (3rd Rev ed.). London: Chatham Publishing. ISBN 978-1-86176-281-8. OCLC 67375475.
- Dittmar, F.J.; Colledge, J.J. (1972). British Warships 1914–1919. Shepperton, UK: Ian Allan. ISBN 0-7110-0380-7.
- Friedman, Norman (2009). British Destroyers: From Earliest Days to the Second World War. Barnsley, UK: Seaforth Publishing. ISBN 978-1-84832-049-9.
- Gardiner, Robert & Gray, Randal, eds. (1985). Conway's All The World's Fighting Ships 1906–1921. London: Conway Maritime Press. ISBN 0-85177-245-5.
- Lyon, David (2001) [1996]. The First Destroyers. London: Caxton Editions. ISBN 1-84067-3648.
- Manning, T. D. (1961). The British Destroyer. London: Putnam & Co. OCLC 6470051.
- March, Edgar J. (1966). British Destroyers: A History of Development, 1892–1953; Drawn by Admiralty Permission From Official Records & Returns, Ships' Covers & Building Plans. London: Seeley Service. OCLC 164893555.
