= HMS Quail (1895) =

Destroyer of the Royal Navy

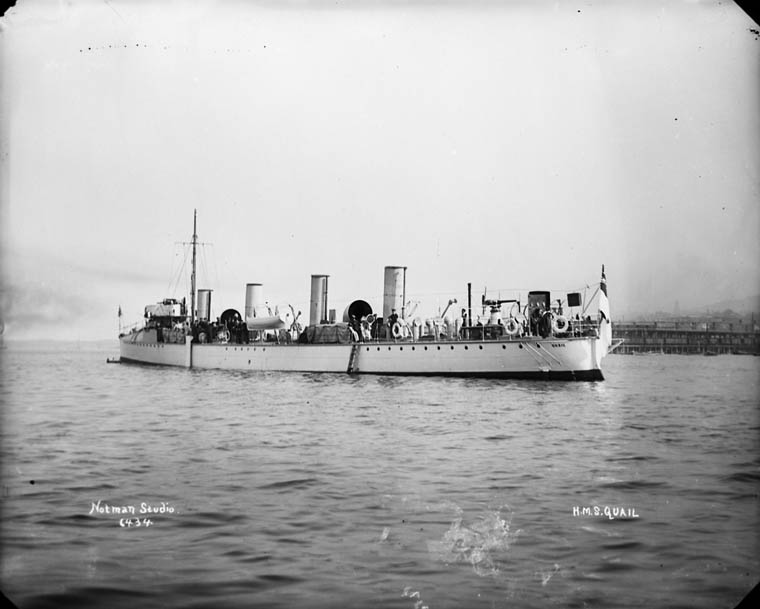
- HMS Quail at Halifax, Nova Scotia with the North America and West Indies Squadron

History

United Kingdom
- Name: HMS Quail
- Builder: Laird Brothers, Birkenhead
- Yard number: 606
- Laid down: 28 May 1895
- Launched: 24 September 1895
- Completed: June 1897
- Fate: Sold for disposal, 23 July 1919

General characteristics
- Class & type: Quail-class destroyer
- Displacement: 355 long tons (361 t) normal, 415 long tons (422 t) deep load
- Length: 218 ft (66.45 m) oa, 213 ft (64.92 m) pp
- Beam: 21 ft 6 in (6.55 m)
- Draught: 9 ft 6 in (2.90 m)
- Propulsion: vertical triple-expansion steam engines; Coal-fired Normand boilers; 6,300 ihp (4,700 kW)
- Speed: 30 kn (56 km/h; 35 mph)
- Range: 1,615 nmi (2,991 km; 1,859 mi) at 11 kn (20 km/h; 13 mph)
- Complement: 63
- Armament: 1 × QF 12-pounder (76 mm) gun; 5 × 6-pounder (57 mm) guns; 2 × 18-inch (450 mm) torpedo tubes

HMS Quail was a B-class torpedo boat destroyer of the British Royal Navy. She was launched by Laird Brothers, Birkenhead, on 24 September 1895. She served in home waters and the West Indies for several years, her robust structure proved by surviving at least one heavy collision. She served during the Great War, and was sold off after the hostilities end, on 23 July 1919. She gave her name to the four strong group of Quail-class destroyers.

== Design and construction ==
HMS Quail was one of four 30-knot destroyers ordered from Laird's as part of the 1894–1895 Royal Navy shipbuilding programme. As with other early Royal Navy destroyers, the detailed design of Quail was left to the builder, with the Admiralty laying down only broad requirements. In order to meet the contract speed of 30 knots (35 mph; 56 km/h) Quail was powered by two four-cylinder triple expansion steam engines, fed by four Normand boilers, rated at 6,300 ihp (4,700 kW), and was fitted with four funnels. She carried the specified armament for the thirty-knotters of a QF 12 pounder 12 cwt (3 in (76 mm) calibre) gun on a platform on the ship's conning tower (in practice the platform was also used as the ship's bridge), with a secondary armament of five 6-pounder guns, and two 18-inch (450 mm) torpedo tubes.

Quail was laid down as Yard No 606 on 28 May 1895, and was launched on 24 September 1895. She reached a speed of 30.385 knots (34.966 mph; 56.273 km/h) over a measured mile and an average speed of 30.039 knots (55.632 km/h; 34.568 mph) over three hours during trials on 11 December 1896. Quail commissioned in June 1897. (Note: Although Quail was the first thirty-knot destroyer for the Royal Navy to be laid down and launched, she was beaten into service by the Thornycroft-built HMS Desperate.)

== Service ==
Newly commissioned, Quail took part in the naval review off Spithead on 26 June 1897 to celebrate the Diamond Jubilee of Queen Victoria. In service, Quail proved to be a strongly-built ship, and a good seaboat, although, like other Laird-built 30-knot destroyers, manoeuvrability was poor, with a wide turning circle.

Quail was sent to the North America and West Indies Station, based at Bermuda, being on station when the Spanish–American War broke out in 1898. In October 1901, Quail and the tender Columbine were ordered to Bermuda to help guard prisoners of war from the Boer War. She took part in the Anglo-German naval blockade of Venezuela during the Venezuela Crisis of 1902–03, but was reported to have her propellers smashed after she stranded near Point Barima in February 1903 and had to be towed to Port of Spain. Quail returned to home waters in 1903, joining the Mediterranean Fleet in October 1904, and returning to the United Kingdom in 1906.

On 7 August 1907, (Note: Gardiner and Gray state the collision occurred on 6 August.) Quail was involved in a collision with the scout cruiser HMS Attentive off Portland, during night manoeuvres, badly damaging the destroyers bow, with Quail having to be towed stern first by Adventure back to port. On 30 May 1910, Quail collided with the British fishing trawler Olivia off Porthallow, Cornwall, England, killing four men from the village of Flushing, Cornwall, aboard Olivia. Quail was a member of the Fifth Destroyer Flotilla, based at Devonport, in 1910, and was still a member of the Fifth Flotilla in 1913.

On 30 August 1912 the Admiralty directed all destroyers were to be grouped into classes designated by letters based on contract speed and appearance. As a four-funneled 30-knotter destroyer, Quail was assigned to the B Class.

On 19 April 1913, Quail collided with the Hull-based trawler Johannesburg on the River Humber, damaging the destroyer's bow.

HMS Quail formed part of the Seventh Destroyer Flotilla based on the Humber on the outbreak of the First World War, continuing operations until the end of the war. She was sold for breaking up on 23 July 1919.

== Bibliography ==
- Chesneau, Roger & Kolesnik, Eugene M., eds. (1979). Conway's All The World's Fighting Ships 1860–1905. London: Conway Maritime Press. ISBN 0-85177-133-5.
- Colledge, J. J.; Warlow, Ben (2006) [1969]. Ships of the Royal Navy: The Complete Record of All Fighting Ships of the Royal Navy from the 15th Century to the Present (3rd Rev ed.). London: Chatham Publishing. ISBN 978-1-86176-281-8. OCLC 67375475.
- Friedman, Norman (2009). British Destroyers: From Earliest Days to the Second World War. Barnsley, UK: Seaforth Publishing. ISBN 978-1-84832-049-9.
- Gardiner, Robert & Gray, Randal, eds. (1985). Conway's All The World's Fighting Ships 1906–1921. London: Conway Maritime Press. ISBN 0-85177-245-5.
- Lyon, David (2001) [1996]. The First Destroyers. London: Caxton Editions. ISBN 1-84067-364-8.
- Manning, T. D. (1961). The British Destroyer. Putnam & Co. OCLC 6470051.
- March, Edgar J. (1966). British Destroyers: A History of Development, 1892–1953; Drawn by Admiralty Permission From Official Records & Returns, Ships' Covers & Building Plans. London: Seeley Service. OCLC 164893555.
