= HMS Virago (1895) =

Destroyer of the Royal Navy

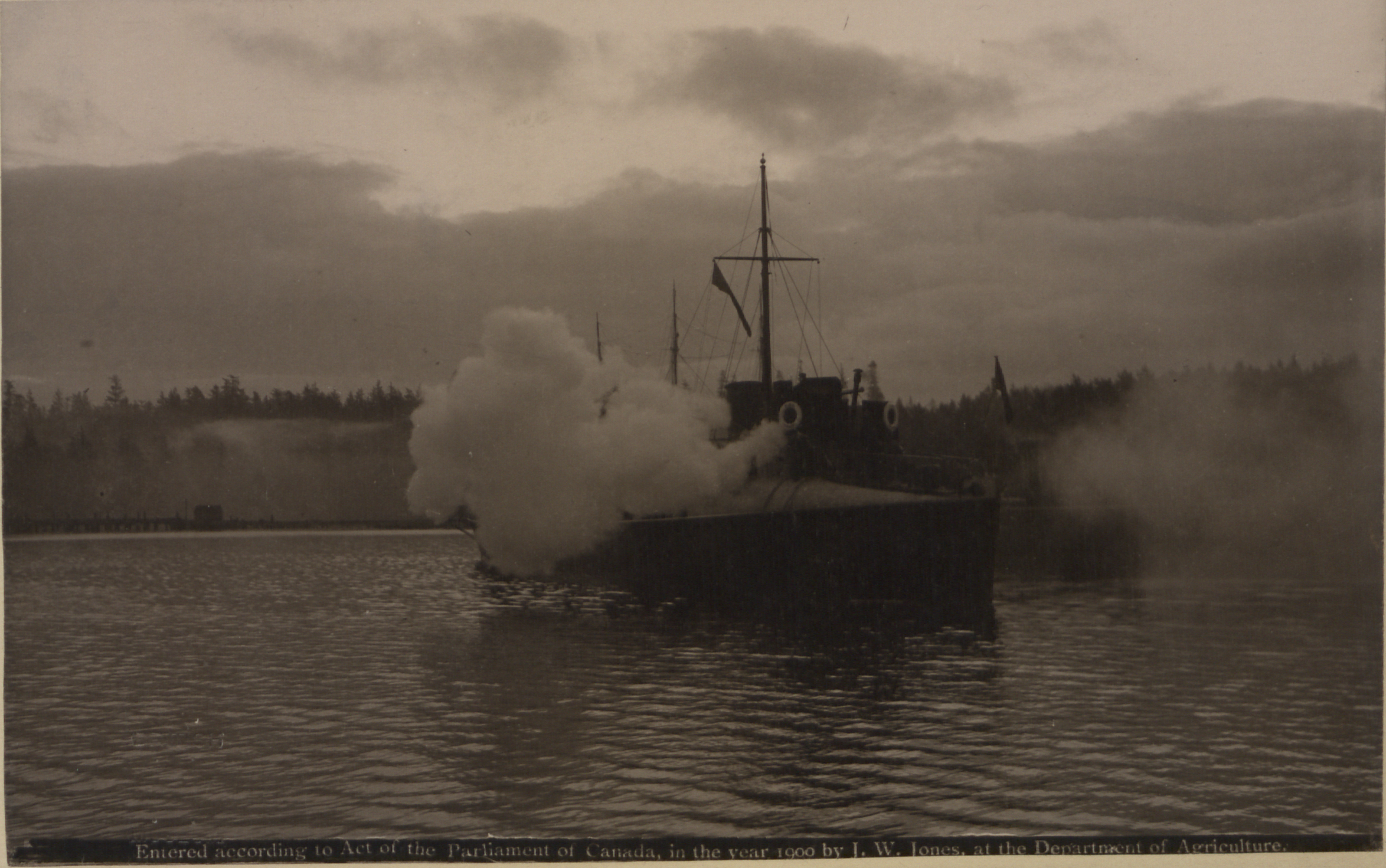
- HMS Virago firing in honour of the King, 1901

History

United Kingdom
- Name: HMS Virago
- Builder: Laird Brothers, Birkenhead
- Laid down: 13 June 1895
- Launched: 19 November 1895
- Completed: June 1897
- Fate: Sold for disposal, 10 October 1919

General characteristics
- Class & type: Quail-class destroyer
- Displacement: 395 long tons (401 t)
- Length: 215 ft (66 m)
- Propulsion: Triple expansion steam engines; Coal-fired Normand boilers; 6,300 hp (4,698 kW)
- Speed: 30 knots (56 km/h; 35 mph)
- Complement: 63
- Armament: 1 × QF 12-pounder gun; 2 × 18 inch (450 mm) torpedo tubes

HMS Virago was a B-class torpedo boat destroyer of the British Royal Navy. She was completed by Laird Brothers, Birkenhead, in 1897. One of four Quail-class destroyers she served during the Great War and was sold off after hostilities ended.

== Construction and design ==
HMS Virago was laid down as Yard number 609 at Laird's shipyard at Birkenhead on 13 June 1895, the fourth "Thirty-Knotter" destroyer ordered from Lairds for the Royal Navy as part of the 1894–95 shipbuilding programme. The ship was launched on 19 November 1895, undergoing sea trials on 27 November 1896, where she reached a speed of 30.365 knots (34.943 mph; 56.236 km/h) over the measured mile and an average speed of 30.049 knots (34.580 mph; 55.651 km/h) over a three-hour run. Virago was completed in June 1897.

Armament was a QF 12 pounder 12 cwt (3 in (76 mm) calibre), with a secondary armament of five 6-pounder guns, and two 18-inch (450 mm) torpedo tubes. As with other early Royal Navy destroyers, the detailed design was left to the builder, with the Admiralty laying down only broad requirements.

Laird's four ships were each powered by two four-cylinder triple expansion steam engines, fed by four Normand boilers, rated at 6,300 ihp (4,700 kW), and were fitted with four funnels. They had an overall length of 218 feet (66.45 m), a beam of 21 feet 6 inches (6.55 m) and a draught of 9 feet 6 inches (2.90 m). Displacement was 355 long tons (361 t) light and 415 long tons (422 t) full load, while crew was 63.

== Service history ==
On 26 June 1897, the newly completed Virago took part in the naval review at Spithead to celebrate the Golden Jubilee of Queen Victoria. The Laird-built torpedo boat destroyers were considered well suited to overseas deployment, being good sea boats and having adequate stability for making long oceanic journeys to their stations, and so Virago was posted, along with sister ship Sparrowhawk to the Pacific Station, based at Esquimalt in British Columbia, Canada. In 1903, Virago was transferred to the China Station.

On 30 August 1912 the Admiralty directed all destroyers were to be grouped into classes designated by letters based on contract speed and appearance. As a four-funneled 30-knotter destroyer, Virago was assigned to the B class.

Virago was still listed as part of the China Squadron in December 1913, but in January 1914, she was listed for sale at Hong Kong. The outbreak of the First World War ended these plans, however, and Virago was re-commissioned at Hong Kong on 15 August 1914. Virago was paid off in preparation for sale on 10 May 1919, and was sold for scrap on 10 October that year.

== Bibliography ==
- Brassey, T. A., ed. (1898). The Naval Annual 1898. Portsmouth, UK: J. Griffin and Co.
- Chesneau, Roger & Kolesnik, Eugene M., eds. (1979). Conway's All The World's Fighting Ships 1860–1905. London: Conway Maritime Press. ISBN 0-85177-133-5.
- Colledge, J. J.; Warlow, Ben (2006) [1969]. Ships of the Royal Navy: The Complete Record of All Fighting Ships of the Royal Navy from the 15th Century to the Present (3rd Rev ed.). London: Chatham Publishing. ISBN 978-1-86176-281-8. OCLC 67375475.
- Dittmar, F.J.; Colledge, J.J. (1972). British Warships 1914–1919. Shepperton, UK: Ian Allan. ISBN 0-7110-0380-7.
- Friedman, Norman (2009). British Destroyers: From Earliest Days to the Second World War. Barnsley, UK: Seaforth Publishing. ISBN 978-1-84832-049-9.
- Gardiner, Robert & Gray, Randal, eds. (1985). Conway's All The World's Fighting Ships 1906–1921. London: Conway Maritime Press. ISBN 0-85177-245-5.
- Lyon, David (2001) [1996]. The First Destroyers. London: Caxton Editions. ISBN 1-84067-364-8.
- Manning, T. D. (1961). The British Destroyer. Putnam & Co. OCLC 6470051.
- March, Edgar J. (1966). British Destroyers: A History of Development, 1892–1953; Drawn by Admiralty Permission From Official Records & Returns, Ships' Covers & Building Plans. London: Seeley Service. OCLC 164893555.
