= HMS Sparrowhawk (1895) =

Destroyer of the Royal Navy

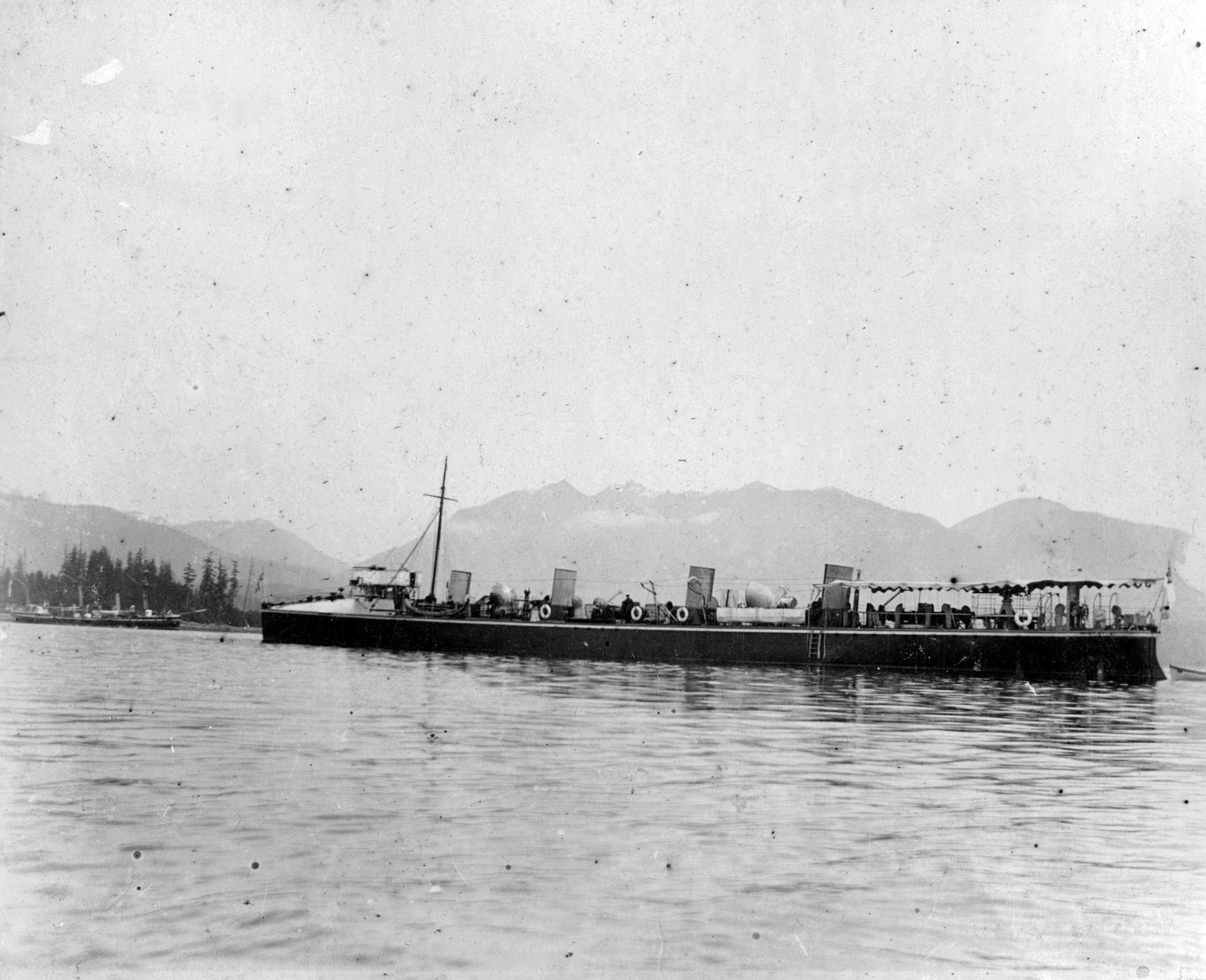
- HMS Sparrowhawk in Burrard Inlet, British Columbia, Canada, circa 1898.

History

United Kingdom
- Name: HMS Sparrowhawk
- Builder: Laird, Son & Co., Birkenhead
- Yard number: 607
- Laid down: 30 May 1895
- Launched: 8 October 1895
- Commissioned: July 1897
- Fate: Wrecked, 17 June 1904

General characteristics
- Class & type: Quail-class destroyer
- Displacement: 355 long tons (361 t) light; 415 long tons (422 t) full load
- Length: 218 ft (66.4 m)
- Beam: 21 ft 6 in (6.55 m)
- Draught: 9 ft 6 in (2.90 m)
- Propulsion: Triple expansion steam engines; Coal-fired Normand boilers; 6,300 hp (4,698 kW)
- Speed: 30 knots (56 km/h; 35 mph)
- Complement: 63
- Armament: 1 × QF 12 pounder 12 cwt naval gun L/40 naval gun; 5 × 6-pdr (57 mm) guns; 2 × single tubes for 18-inch (450mm) torpedoes

HMS Sparrowhawk was a B-class torpedo boat destroyer of the Royal Navy. She was completed by Laird, Son & Company, Birkenhead, and was launched on 8 October 1895. She served on the China Station and was wrecked in the mouth of the Yangtze River in 1904. She was one of four Quail-class destroyers.

== Design and construction ==
HMS Sparrowhawk was the second of four 30-knot destroyers ordered from Laird's as part of the 1894–1895 Royal Navy shipbuilding programme. As with other early Royal Navy destroyers, the detailed design was left to the builder, with the Admiralty laying down only broad requirements. In order to meet the contract speed of 30 knots (35 mph; 56 km/h), Laird's design was powered by two four-cylinder triple expansion steam engines, fed by four Normand boilers, rated at 6,300 ihp (4,700 kW), and was fitted with four funnels.

The ship had an overall length of 218 feet (66.45 m), a beam of 21 feet 6 inches (6.55 m) and a draught of 9 feet 6 inches (2.90 m). Displacement was 355 long tons (361 t) light and 415 long tons (422 t) full load, while crew was 63. Armament consisted of a QF 12 pounder 12 cwt (3 in (76 mm) calibre) gun on a platform on the ship's conning tower (in practice the platform was also used as the ship's bridge), with a secondary armament of five 6-pounder guns, and two 18-inch (450 mm) torpedo tubes.

Sparrowhawk was laid down as Yard No 607 on 30 May 1895, and was launched on 8 October 1895. She reached a speed of 30.207 knots (34.762 mph; 55.943 km/h) over a measured mile and an average speed of 30.56 knots (56.60 km/h; 35.17 mph) over three hours during trials on 11 December 1896. Sparrowhawk commissioned in June 1897.

== Service ==
Newly commissioned, Sparrowhawk took part in the naval review off Spithead on 26 June 1897 to celebrate the Diamond Jubilee of Queen Victoria. Laird's thirty-knotters were considered strongly built ships and good seaboats, suitable for deployment on overseas stations, and so Sparrowhawk and sister ship Virago were deployed to the Pacific Station in 1897, being based at Esquimault, British Columbia, Canada.

Sparrowhawk was later deployed to the China Station. On 17 June 1904, Sparrowhawk struck an uncharted rock off the mouth of the Yangtze river during fleet exercises. While all the crew survived, attempts by the battleship Glory to recover the stricken destroyer failed, and Sparrowhawk sank.

== Bibliography ==
- Chesneau, Roger & Kolesnik, Eugene M., eds. (1979). Conway's All The World's Fighting Ships 1860–1905. London: Conway Maritime Press. ISBN 0-85177-133-5.
- Colledge, J. J.; Warlow, Ben (2006) [1969]. Ships of the Royal Navy: The Complete Record of All Fighting Ships of the Royal Navy from the 15th Century to the Present (3rd Rev ed.). London: Chatham Publishing. ISBN 978-1-86176-281-8. OCLC 67375475.
- Friedman, Norman (2009). British Destroyers: From Earliest Days to the Second World War. Barnsley, UK: Seaforth Publishing. ISBN 978-1-84832-049-9.
- Lyon, David (2001) [1996]. The First Destroyers. London: Caxton Editions. ISBN 1-84067-364-8.
- Manning, Thomas Davys (1961). The British Destroyer. Putnam & Co. OCLC 6470051.
- March, Edgar J. (1966). British Destroyers: A History of Development, 1892–1953; Drawn by Admiralty Permission From Official Records & Returns, Ships' Covers & Building Plans. London: Seeley Service. OCLC 164893555.
