= HMS Locust (1896) =

Destroyer of the Royal Navy

History

United Kingdom
- Name: HMS Locust
- Builder: Laird, Son & Co., Birkenhead
- Laid down: 20 April 1896
- Launched: 5 December 1896
- Christened: Miss Busk
- Completed: July 1898
- Fate: Scrapped, 1919

General characteristics
- Class & type: Earnest-class destroyer
- Displacement: 395 long tons (401 t)
- Length: 218 ft (66 m) oa
- Beam: 21 ft 6 in (6.6 m)
- Draught: 9 ft 9 in (3.0 m)
- Propulsion: vertical triple-expansion steam engines; Coal-fired Normand boilers; 6,300 ihp (4,698 kW)
- Speed: 30 knots (56 km/h; 35 mph)
- Complement: 63
- Armament: 1 × QF 12-pounder gun; 2 × 18 inch (450 mm) torpedo tubes

HMS Locust was a B-class torpedo boat destroyer of the British Royal Navy. She was launched by Laird, Son & Company, Birkenhead, on 5 December 1896. She served in the Mediterranean between 1902 and 1906, and was used for patrol and escort duties during the First World War

== Construction ==
Locust was ordered on 23 December 1896 as the third of six 30-knotter destroyers programmed to be built by Lairds under the 1895–1896 shipbuilding programme for the Royal Navy. These followed on from four very similar destroyers ordered from Lairds as part of the 1894–1895 programme.

Locust was 218 feet (66.45 m) long overall and 213 feet (64.92 m) between perpendiculars, with a beam of 21 feet 6 inches (6.55 m) and a draught of 9 feet 9 inches (2.97 m). Displacement was 355 long tons (361 t) light and 415 long tons (422 t) full load. Like the other Laird-built 30-knotters, Locust was propelled by two triple expansion steam engines, fed by four Normand boilers, rated at 6,300 ihp (4,700 kW), and was fitted with four funnels.

Armament was the standard for the 30-knotters, i.e. a QF 12 pounder 12 cwt (3 in (76 mm) calibre) gun on a platform on the ship's conning tower (in practice the platform was also used as the ship's bridge), with a secondary armament of five 6-pounder guns, and two 18-inch (450 mm) torpedo tubes. The ship had a crew of 63 officers and men.

Locust was laid down at Laird's Birkenhead shipyard as Yard number 623 on 20 April 1894 and was launched on 5 December 1896, when she was named by Miss Busk. During sea trials on 21 January 1898, Locust reached an average speed of 30.26 knots (56.04 km/h; 34.82 mph) over six runs of a measured mile and 30.16 knots (55.86 km/h; 34.71 mph) on a three-hour run. She was completed in July 1898, and was the third ship of that name to serve with the Royal Navy.

== Service history ==
On 2 February 1900 she was commissioned as tender to HMS Vivid, shore establishment at Devonport, for service in the Devonport Instructional flotilla, and Lieutenant Stephen Herbert Radcliffe was appointed in command. A mere week into her commission, she had her stem damaged while in the Falmouth harbour when the destroyer Fairy dragged her moorings and drifted into Locust and other ships of the flotilla. Following repairs in Devonport, she was back in the flotilla the following month. Lieutenant Hepworth Staley Alton was appointed in command on 15 January 1901, and was in charge as she took part in the 1901 Naval Manoeuvres. On 5 December 1901 she was recommissioned as tender to the battleship Victorious on the Mediterranean station. She left Devonport for Malta in January the following year. Lieutenant the Hon. Arthur Brandreth Scott Dutton was appointed in command in April 1902, and in August that year she visited Lemnos. In early January 1903 she took part in a three-weeks cruise with other ships of her squadron in the Greek islands around Corfu.

The future Admiral of the Fleet, Andrew Cunningham, was appointed her second-in-command while a sub-lieutenant, in September 1903. Locust returned to the United Kingdom in 1906.

On 30 August 1912 the Admiralty directed all destroyers were to be grouped into classes designated by letters based on contract speed and appearance. As a four-funneled 30-knotter destroyer, Locust was assigned to the B Class.

Locust was a member of the Fifth Destroyer Flotilla, based at Devonport, in 1912, and after a reorganisation of the Royal Navy's destroyer flotillas in 1912, with older destroyers being transferred to patrol flotillas, joined the Seventh Destroyer Flotilla, also based at Devonport.

Locust remained part of the Seventh Patrol Flotilla in August 1914, which transferred to the Humber on the East coast of England following the outbreak of the First World War. In November 1914, Locust was transferred to Scapa Flow, where she carried out local patrol and escort duties. Locust remained part of the Scapa Flow local patrol forces until January 1918, but transferred to the Firth of Forth as part of the Methil Convoy Flotilla by February that year. By May 1918, Locust had moved again, returning to the Seventh Flotilla based on the Humber, remaining there until the end of the war.

Locust was sold for scrap to J. Jackson on 10 June 1919.

== Pennant numbers ==
Pennant number	Date
D29	1914
D84	September 1915
D54	January 1918
H02	April 1918

== Bibliography ==
- Brassey, T. A., ed. (1898). The Naval Annual 1898. Portsmouth, UK: J Griffin and Co.
- Brassey, T. A., ed. (1902). The Naval Annual 1902. Portsmouth, UK: J. Griffin and Co.
- Chesneau, Roger & Kolesnik, Eugene M., eds. (1979). Conway's All The World's Fighting Ships 1860–1905. London: Conway Maritime Press. ISBN 0-85177-133-5.
- Colledge, J. J.; Warlow, Ben (2006) [1969]. Ships of the Royal Navy: The Complete Record of All Fighting Ships of the Royal Navy from the 15th Century to the Present (3rd Rev ed.). London: Chatham Publishing. ISBN 978-1-86176-281-8. OCLC 67375475.
- Corbett, Julian S. (1920). History of the Great War: Naval Operations: Vol. I: To the Battle of the Falklands December 1914. London: Longmans, Green and Co.
- Dittmar, F.J.; Colledge, J.J. (1972). British Warships 1914–1919. Shepperton, UK: Ian Allan. ISBN 0-7110-0380-7.
- Friedman, Norman (2009). British Destroyers: From Earliest Days to the Second World War. Barnsley, UK: Seaforth Publishing. ISBN 978-1-84832-049-9.
- Gardiner, Robert & Gray, Randal, eds. (1985). Conway's All The World's Fighting Ships 1906–1921. London: Conway Maritime Press. ISBN 0-85177-245-5.
- Hepper, David; Conway, Michael S. (June 2021). "Question 18/57". Warship International. LVIII (2): 100–101. ISSN 0043-0374.
- Lyon, David (2001) [1996]. The First Destroyers. London: Caxton Editions. ISBN 1-84067-3648.
- Manning, T. D. (1961). The British Destroyer. London: Putnam & Co. OCLC 6470051.
- March, Edgar J. (1966). British Destroyers: A History of Development, 1892–1953; Drawn by Admiralty Permission From Official Records & Returns, Ships' Covers & Building Plans. London: Seeley Service. OCLC 164893555.
