= HMS Arab (1901) =

Destroyer of the Royal Navy

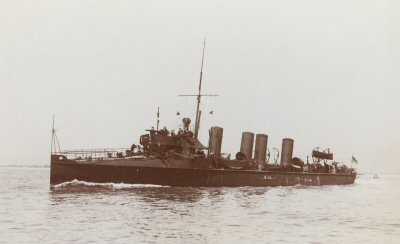
- HMS Arab

History

United Kingdom
- Name: HMS Arab
- Ordered: 1896/1897 Programme
- Builder: John Brown & Company
- Launched: 9 February 1901
- Commissioned: 12 January 1903
- Fate: Disposed of in 1919

General characteristics
- Class & type: B-class torpedo boat destroyer
- Displacement: 470 tons
- Propulsion: 8,600 ihp (6,400 kW) at forced draught
- Speed: 30.5 knots (56.5 km/h)
- Complement: 69
- Armament: 1 × 12-pounder gun; 2 × torpedo tubes; 5 × 6-pounder guns

HMS Arab (1896 to 1897 Programme) was a B-class torpedo boat destroyer of the British Royal Navy. She was laid down by J & G Thomson at Clydebank and completed by John Brown & Company who took over the yard.

== Construction and design ==
As part of the 1896–1897 construction programme for the Royal Navy, the British Admiralty placed orders for thirty torpedo boat destroyers. Of these ships, 17 were required to meet the standard contract speed of 30 knots (56 km/h; 35 mph), while the remaining three destroyers, with one each ordered from Laird, Thornycroft and J & G Thomson, were required to reach higher speeds, with Thomson's and Thornycroft's designs (built as Arab and Albatross) contracted for 32 knots (59 km/h; 37 mph) while Laird's ship, Express, had a speed of 33 knots (61 km/h; 38 mph) specified.

Arab was 232 feet (70.71 m) long overall, with a beam of 22 feet 3 inches (6.78 m) and a draught of 9 feet 9 inches (2.97 m). She displaced 470 long tons (480 t) light and 530 long tons (540 t) full load. Four coal-fed Normand boilers, with four funnels, fed two triple expansion steam engines rated at 8,600 indicated horsepower (6,400 kW) which drove two propeller shafts. Sufficient coal was carried to give a range of 1,620 nautical miles (3,000 km; 1,860 mi) at 11 knots (20 km/h; 13 mph).

She carried the specified armament for the thirty-knotters of a QF 12-pounder 12 cwt (3 in, 76 mm calibre) gun on a platform on the ship's conning tower (in practice the platform was also used as the ship's bridge), with a secondary armament of five 6-pounder guns, and two 18-inch (450 mm) torpedo tubes. While the ship carried the same armament as normal thirty-knotter destroyers, the more powerful engines needed more coal and hence more stokers were needed to feed the coal to the engines, with Arab's crew being 69 officers and men, compared to 63 for thirty-knotters built by Thomsons.

Construction work on Arab was delayed owing to problems during the sea trials of the thirty-knotter destroyers built by Thomsons under the 1895–1896 programme, which required significant modification to reach the required speed. Arab was finally laid down on 5 March 1900 and launched on 9 February 1901. Arab ran 9 trials between 11 March and 27 May 1901, but like the other two high-speed destroyers ordered under the 1896–1897 programme, failed to meet the contracted speed, with the maximum speed reached only 30.769 knots (56.984 km/h; 35.408 mph). She was delivered to the Royal Navy on 20 October 1902, with the Admiralty imposing a £3000 penalty owing to the ships failure to meet contract speed, the final price paid being £63,642.

== Service ==
Arab served in home waters for the whole of her career. She was commissioned at Portsmouth by Commander Hubert Brand on 12 January 1903, to relieve the HMS Success as senior officer′s ship in the Portsmouth Instructional Flotilla. Arab was refitted in 1908, having her boilers retubed. In 1910, Arab was part of the Fifth Destroyer Flotilla at Devonport, serving as part of that flotilla until 1912. On 30 August 1912 the Admiralty directed all destroyers were to be grouped into classes designated by letters based on contract speed and appearance. Four-funneled, 30-knotter destroyers were grouped as the B class, and Arab was assigned to this class. By March 1913, Arab, still based at Devonport, was part of the Seventh Destroyer Flotilla, one of four flotillas equipped with old destroyers and torpedo boats for patrol purposes.

Following the outbreak of the First World War in August 1914, the Seventh Flotilla moved to the East coast of England. In November 1914 Arab was transferred to Scapa Flow as one of a force of 29 destroyers used for local patrols of this vital naval base. In April 1917, the German submarine U-30 carried a series of attacks on shipping between Bergen in Norway and Lerwick in Shetland. U-30 sank five ships on 13 April, and sank another, SS Fjeldi by gunfire on the morning of 14 April. The crew of the Norwegian merchant ship SS Rondane, sailing astern of Fjeldi, abandoned ship on seeing the attack, but Arab managed to force U-30 to submerge before the submarine could attack Rondane, allowing the Norwegian ship's crew to reboard her. On 7 July 1917, Arab was part of the escort of a Norway-bound convoy when a submarine was spotted. The yacht Amalthaea and whaler Pilot Whale opened fire on the submarine, while Arab attacked with depth charges, driving the submarine away from the convoy. On 19 July 1917, Arab and the destroyer Sarpedon were escorting an east-bound convoy on the Scandinavian (Lerwick–Norway) route, when the convoy came under attack by the German submarine U-67, which sank the Danish steamer Harrildsborg. Arab successfully rescued the 19-strong crew of the merchant ship.

Arab remained based at Scapa until January 1918, but then transferred to the Firth of Forth as part of the Methil Convoy Flotilla. By May 1918, Arab transferred to the Seventh Flotilla, based on the Humber, remaining there until the end of the war.

Arab was sold for scrap on 23 July 1919.

== Pennant numbers ==
Pennant number	Date
D01	1914
D77	September 1915
D05	January 1918
H.08	April 1918

== Bibliography ==
- Chesneau, Roger & Kolesnik, Eugene M., eds. (1979). Conway's All The World's Fighting Ships 1860–1905. London: Conway Maritime Press. ISBN 0-85177-133-5.
- Colledge, J. J.; Warlow, Ben (2006) [1969]. Ships of the Royal Navy: The Complete Record of All Fighting Ships of the Royal Navy from the 15th Century to the Present (3rd Rev ed.). London: Chatham Publishing. ISBN 978-1-86176-281-8. OCLC 67375475.
- Dittmar, F.J.; Colledge, J.J. (1972). British Warships 1914–1919. Shepperton, UK: Ian Allan. ISBN 0-7110-0380-7.
- Friedman, Norman (2009). British Destroyers: From Earliest Days to the Second World War. Barnsley, UK: Seaforth Publishing. ISBN 978-1-84832-049-9.
- Gardiner, Robert & Gray, Randal, eds. (1985). Conway's All The World's Fighting Ships 1906–1921. London: Conway Maritime Press. ISBN 0-85177-245-5.
- Hurd, Archibald (1929). The Merchant Navy: Vol. III. History of the Great War Based on Official Documents. London: John Murray.
- Hythe, Thomas, ed. (1912). The Naval Annual. Portsmouth: J. Griffin & Co.
- Lyon, David (2001) [1996]. The First Destroyers. London: Caxton Editions. ISBN 1-84067-3648.
- Manning, T. D. (1961). The British Destroyer. London: Putnam & Co. OCLC 6470051.
- March, Edgar J. (1966). British Destroyers: A History of Development, 1892–1953; Drawn by Admiralty Permission From Official Records & Returns, Ships' Covers & Building Plans. London: Seeley Service. OCLC 164893555.
- Monograph No. 34: Home Waters—Part VIII: December 1916 to April 1917 (PDF). Naval Staff Monographs (Historical). Vol. XVIII. The Naval Staff, Training and Staff Duties Division. 1933.
- Monograph No. 35: Home Waters—Part IX: 1st May 1917 to 31st July 1917 (PDF). Naval Staff Monographs (Historical). Vol. XIX. The Naval Staff, Training and Staff Duties Division. 1939.
