= HMS Earnest (1896) =

Destroyer of the Royal Navy

History

United Kingdom
- Name: HMS Earnest
- Builder: Laird, Son & Co., Birkenhead
- Laid down: 2 March 1896
- Launched: 7 November 1896
- Completed: November 1897
- Fate: Scrapped, 1920

General characteristics
- Class & type: Earnest-class destroyer
- Displacement: 395 long tons (401 t)
- Length: 210 ft (64 m)
- Beam: 21.5 ft (6.6 m)
- Draught: 9.75 ft (3.0 m)
- Propulsion: vertical triple-expansion steam engines; Coal-fired Normand boilers; 6,300 hp (4,698 kW)
- Speed: 30 knots (56 km/h; 35 mph)
- Complement: 63
- Armament: 1 × QF 12-pounder gun; 2 × 18 inch (450 mm) torpedo tubes

HMS Earnest was a "thirty-knotter" torpedo boat destroyer of the British Royal Navy. She was built by Laird, Son & Company at their Birkenhead shipyard as one of six Earnest-class destroyers ordered as part of the Royal Navy's 1895–1896 construction programme, which were later classified as members of the B-class. Earnest was launched on 7 November 1896 and was completed in November 1897.

Earnest served in the Mediterranean from 1898 to 1907, before returning to Britain. She remained in service in the First World War, being employed on patrol and convoy escort duties in the North Sea and Irish Sea. Earnest was sold for scrap on 7 January 1920.

== Design and construction ==
Earnest was ordered on 23 December 1895 as the first of six 30-knotter destroyers programmed to be built by Lairds under the 1895–1896 shipbuilding programme for the Royal Navy. These followed on from four very similar destroyers ordered from Lairds as part of the 1894–1895 programme.

Earnest was 218 feet (66.45 m) long overall and 213 feet (64.92 m) between perpendiculars, with a beam of 21 feet 6 inches (6.55 m) and a draught of 9 feet 9 inches (2.97 m). Displacement was 355 long tons (361 t) light and 415 long tons (422 t) full load. Like the other Laird-built 30-knotters, Locust was propelled by two triple expansion steam engines, fed by four Normand boilers, rated at 6,300 ihp (4,700 kW), and was fitted with four funnels.

Armament was the standard for the 30-knotters, i.e. a QF 12 pounder 12 cwt (3 in (76 mm) calibre) gun on a platform on the ship's conning tower (in practice the platform was also used as the ship's bridge), with a secondary armament of five 6-pounder guns, and two 18-inch (450 mm) torpedo tubes. The ship had a crew of 63 officers and men.

Earnest was laid down at Laird's Birkenhead shipyard as Yard number 621 on 2 March 1896 and was launched on 7 November 1896. Earnest reached 30.13 knots (55.80 km/h; 34.67 mph) during sea trials. She was completed in November 1897.

== Service ==
In 1897 Earnest was in reserve at Devonport. She was transferred to the Mediterranean Squadron in September 1898, and was in August 1901 recommissioned at Malta as tender to the battleship HMS Caesar. Lieutenant Philip Agnew Bateman-Champain was in command from November 1901. She visited Greek waters (including Nauplia) in September 1902, and in early January 1903 took part in a three-weeks cruise with other ships of the squadron in the Greek islands around Corfu. Earnest returned to Home waters in 1907.

Earnest was a member of the Eastern group of destroyers based at Harwich in 1908, entering refit at Chatham Dockyard in September that year. In February 1910, Earnest, by now a member of the Nore Destroyer Flotilla, was again under refit at Chatham.

On 30 August 1912 the Admiralty directed all destroyers were to be grouped into classes designated by letters based on contract speed and appearance. As a four-funneled 30-knotter destroyer, Earnest was assigned to the B Class. In 1912, older destroyers were transferred to patrol flotillas, with Earnest forming part of the 7th Destroyer Flotilla, based at Devonport, by March 1913. In November 1913, Earnest was under repair at Sheerness Dockyard following a collision with another destroyer. Earnest remained part of the 7th Flotilla on the eve of the First World War in July 1914.

At the outbreak of war, the 7th Flotilla was redeployed to the Humber River for operations off the East coast of Britain. Duties of the Flotilla were to prevent enemy ships from carrying out minelaying or torpedo attacks in the approaches to ports on the East coast, and to prevent raids by enemy ships. Earnest was still part of the 7th Flotilla in June 1917, while in July was listed as part of the East Coast Convoy Flotilla, although in August Earnest had returned to the 7th Flotilla, which was recorded as being involved in East Coast Convoys. By October, Earnest was listed as being part of the Local Defence Flotilla for the Nore, where she remained in February 1918. By March, Earnest was one of seven destroyers making up the Irish Sea Flotilla, which by July had been renamed the Irish Sea Hunting Flotilla. She remained part of the Irish Sea Hunting Flotilla at the end of the war in November 1918, and was based at Kingstown (now Dún Laoghaire) in the South of Ireland.

Earnest was sold for scrap to the shipbreakers S. Castle of Plymouth on 7 January 1920.

== Pennant numbers ==
| Pennant number | From | To |
|---|---|---|
| D05 | 1914 | September 1915 |
| D79 | September 1915 | January 1918 |
| D29 | January 1918 | |

== Bibliography ==
- Brassey, T.A. (1902). The Naval Annual 1902. Portsmouth, UK: J. Griffin and Co.
- Chesneau, Roger; Kolesnik, Eugene M, eds. (1979). Conway's All The World's Fighting Ships 1860–1905. London: Conway Maritime Press. ISBN 0-85177-133-5.
- Colledge, J. J.; Warlow, Ben (2006) [1969]. Ships of the Royal Navy: The Complete Record of All Fighting Ships of the Royal Navy from the 15th Century to the Present (3rd Rev ed.). London: Chatham Publishing. ISBN 978-1-86176-281-8. OCLC 67375475.
- Corbett, Julian S. (1920). History of the Great War: Naval Operations: Vol. I: To the Battle of the Falklands December 1914. London: Longmans, Green and Co.
- Dittmar, F.J.; Colledge, J.J. (1972). British Warships 1914–1919. Shepperton, UK: Ian Allan. ISBN 0-7110-0380-7.
- Friedman, Norman (2009). British Destroyers: From Earliest Days to the Second World War. Barnsley, UK: Seaforth Publishing. ISBN 978-1-84832-049-9.
- Gardiner, Robert; Gray, Randal, eds. (1985). Conway's All The World's Fighting Ships 1906–1921. London: Conway Maritime Press. ISBN 0-85177-245-5.
- Lyon, David (2001). The First Destroyers. London: Caxton Editions. ISBN 1-84067-3648.
- Manning, T.D. (1961). The British Destroyer. London: Putnam. OCLC 6470051.
- March, Edgar J. (1966). British Destroyers: A History of Development, 1892–1953; Drawn by Admiralty Permission From Official Records & Returns, Ships' Covers & Building Plans. London: Seeley Service. OCLC 164893555.
- Monograph No. 7: The Patrol Flotillas at the Commencement of the War (PDF). Naval Staff Monographs (Historical). Vol. III. The Naval Staff, Training and Staff Duties Division. 1921. pp. 71–107.
