= HMS Success (1901) =

Destroyer of the Royal Navy

History

United Kingdom
- Name: Success
- Laid down: 18 September 1899
- Launched: 21 March 1901
- Completed: May 1902
- Commissioned: 9 June 1902
- Fate: Wrecked, 27 December 1914

General characteristics
- Class & type: B-class destroyer
- Displacement: 380 long tons (386 t)
- Length: 214.75 ft (65.5 m)
- Beam: 21 ft (6.4 m)
- Draught: 8 ft 10 in (2.7 m)
- Installed power: Normand boilers; 6,000 ihp (4,474 kW)
- Propulsion: Triple-expansion steam engines
- Speed: 30 knots (56 km/h; 35 mph)
- Armament: 1 × QF 12-pounder gun; 5 × 6-pounder guns; 2 × 18 inch (450 mm) torpedo tubes

HMS Success was a B-class torpedo boat destroyer of the Royal Navy. She was launched on 21 March 1901. On 27 December 1914 she was wrecked off Fife Ness during heavy gales.

== Design and construction ==
HMS Success was ordered on 30 March 1899 from William Doxford & Sons as part of the British Admiralty's 1899–1900 shipbuilding programme, one of twelve "thirty-knotter" destroyers ordered from various shipyards under this programme. Success closely resembled Doxford's Lee, ordered under the 1897–1898 programme, with the major difference being that the ship had three funnels rather than four.

Success was 215 feet (65.53 m) long overall and 210 feet (64.01 m) between perpendiculars, with a beam of 21 feet (6.40 m) and a draught of 8 feet 10 inches (2.69 m). Displacement was 380 long tons (390 t) light and 425 long tons (432 t) full load. Four Thornycroft boilers fed two triple-expansion engines rated at 6,000 indicated horsepower (4,500 kW) which drove two propeller shafts, giving a speed of 30 knots (56 km/h; 35 mph). Armament was as standard for the "thirty-knotters", with a QF 12 pounder 12 cwt (Note: "Cwt" is the abbreviation for hundredweight, 12cwt referring to the weight of the gun.) (3 in (76 mm) calibre) gun on a platform on the ship's conning tower (also used as the ship's bridge), with a secondary armament of five 6-pounder guns, and two 18 inch (450 mm) torpedo tubes.

Success was laid down at Doxford's Sunderland shipyard as yard number 282 on 18 September 1899, launched on 21 March 1901 and completed in May 1902.

== Service history ==
Success was commissioned at Portsmouth on 9 June 1902 by Commander Douglas Nicholson and the crew of HMS Dove, which had been docked for repairs after going aground. She succeeded the latter ship in the Portsmouth instructional flotilla, and took part in the fleet review held at Spithead on 16 August 1902 for the coronation of King Edward VII. Commander Hubert Brand was appointed in command on 20 December 1902, but left after only three weeks in mid-January 1903 to take the command of HMS Arab, which succeeded the Success as senior officer′s ship in the Portsmouth flotilla.

== Bibliography ==
- Brassey, T.A. (1902). The Naval Annual 1902. J. Griffin and Co.
- Colledge, J. J.; Warlow, Ben (2006) [1969]. Ships of the Royal Navy: The Complete Record of All Fighting Ships of the Royal Navy from the 15th Century to the Present (3rd Rev ed.). London: Chatham Publishing. ISBN 978-1-86176-281-8. OCLC 67375475.
- Dittmar, F.J.; Colledge, J.J. (1972). British Warships 1914–1919. Ian Allan. ISBN 0-7110-0380-7.
- Friedman, Norman (2009). British Destroyers From Earliest Days to the Second World War. Naval Institute Press. ISBN 978-1-59114-081-8.
- Hepper, David (2006). British Warship Losses in the Ironclad Era, 1860–1919. Chatham Publishing. ISBN 978-1-861762-73-3.
- Lyon, David (2001) [1996]. The First Destroyers. Caxton Editions. ISBN 1-84067-3648.
- March, Edgar J. (1966). British Destroyers: A History of Development, 1892–1953; Drawn by Admiralty Permission From Official Records & Returns, Ships' Covers & Building Plans. Seeley Service. OCLC 164893555.
- Roberts, John (1979). "Great Britain (including Empire Forces)". In Chesneau, Roger & Kolesnik, Eugene M. (eds.). Conway's All the World's Fighting Ships 1860–1905. Mayflower Books. pp. 1–113. ISBN 0-8317-0302-4.
