= HMS Kangaroo (1900) =

Destroyer of the Royal Navy

History

United Kingdom
- Name: HMS Kangaroo
- Builder: Palmers Shipbuilding and Iron Company
- Laid down: 29 December 1899
- Launched: 8 September 1900
- Fate: Sold for scrap, 23 February 1920

General characteristics
- Class & type: B-class destroyer
- Displacement: 390 long tons (400 t) normal, 420 long tons (430 t) deep load
- Length: 219 ft 9 in (66.98 m) oa, 215 ft 0 in (65.53 m) pp
- Beam: 20 ft 9 in (6.32 m)
- Draught: 8 ft 11 in (2.72 m)
- Propulsion: 4 Reed boilers, Vertical triple-expansion steam engines, 2 shafts, 6,200 ihp (4,600 kW)
- Speed: 30 kn (56 km/h; 35 mph)
- Range: 1,635 nmi (3,028 km; 1,882 mi) at 11 kn (20 km/h; 13 mph)
- Complement: 63
- Armament: 1 × QF 12-pounder gun; 5 × 6-pounder guns; 2 × 18 inch (450 mm) torpedo tubes

HMS Kangaroo was a B-class torpedo boat destroyer of the British Royal Navy. (Note: On 30 August 1912 the Admiralty directed all destroyers were to be grouped into classes designated by letters based on contract speed and appearance. As a four-funneled 30-knotter destroyer, Kangaroo was assigned to the B class.) She served with the Dover Patrol in the First World War.

== Construction and design ==
Kangaroo was laid down by Palmers Shipbuilding and Iron Company at Jarrow-on-Tyne as Yard Number 787 on 29 December 1899 with work starting on speculation (i.e. without a specific order), but was purchased for the Royal Navy as part of the 1900–1901 shipbuilding programme. She was launched on 8 September 1900 and completed in July 1901.

Kangaroo was of similar design to HMS Peterel, Myrmidon and Syren, three "Thirty-Knotter" destroyers built by Palmers under the 1899–1900 programme. Like these ships, she was powered by triple-expansion steam engines fed by four Reed boilers and driving two propeller shafts. Four funnels were fitted, with the two middle funnels very closely spaced. The machinery was rated at 6,200 indicated horsepower (4,600 kW), sufficient to propel the ship at her contract speed of 30 knots (56 km/h; 35 mph).

Gun armament consisted of a single QF 12-pounder 12 cwt (3 in (76 mm) calibre) gun forward on a platform on the ship's conning tower together with five 6-pounder guns. Two 18-inch (450 mm) torpedo tubes completed the ship's armament.

== Service ==
Kangaroo was commissioned in August 1901 by Lieutenant Charles Edward Whately Pyddoke for service on the Mediterranean Station. She visited Lemnos in August 1902, and the following month was part of a squadron visiting Nauplia and Souda Bay at Crete. She returned to the United Kingdom in 1905. Apart from this tour in the Mediterranean, Kangaroo spent most of her duty time in home waters. In 1906 Kangaroo was part of the First Destroyer Division. She was part of the Fourth Destroyer Flotilla at Portsmouth between 1910 and 1912, and then joined the Sixth Destroyer Flotilla.

Kangaroo remained part of the Sixth Destroyer Flotilla, based at Dover for the duration of the First World War.

HMS Kangaroo was finally sold for scrap to M. Yates on 23 February 1920, but was resold to Thos. W. Ward and broken up at Milford Haven.

== Pennant numbers ==
| Pennant number | From | To |
|---|---|---|
| P02 | 6 Dec 1914 | 1 Sep 1915 |
| D82 | 1 Sep 1915 | 1 Jan 1918 |
| D48 | 1 Jan 1918 | - |

== Bibliography ==
- Bacon, Reginald (1918). The Dover Patrol 1915–1917. Vol. II. London: Hutchinson & Son.
- Colledge, J. J.; Warlow, Ben (2006) [1969]. Ships of the Royal Navy: The Complete Record of All Fighting Ships of the Royal Navy from the 15th Century to the Present (3rd Rev ed.). London: Chatham Publishing. ISBN 978-1-86176-281-8. OCLC 67375475.
- Dittmar, F.J.; Colledge, J.J. (1972). British Warships 1914–1919. Shepperton, UK: Ian Allan. ISBN 0-7110-0380-7.
- Friedman, Norman (2009). British Destroyers: From Earliest Days to the Second World War. Barnsley, UK: Seaforth Publishing. ISBN 978-1-84832-049-9.
- Gardiner, Robert & Gray, Randal, eds. (1985). Conway's All The World's Fighting Ships 1906–1921. London: Conway Maritime Press. ISBN 0-85177-245-5.
- Lyon, David (2001) [1996]. The First Destroyers. London: Caxton Editions. ISBN 1-84067-3648.
- Manning, T. D. (1961). The British Destroyer. London: Putnam & Co. OCLC 6470051.
- March, Edgar J. (1966). British Destroyers: A History of Development, 1892–1953; Drawn by Admiralty Permission From Official Records & Returns, Ships' Covers & Building Plans. London: Seeley Service. OCLC 164893555.
