= HMS Seal (1897) =

Destroyer of the Royal Navy

History

United Kingdom
- Name: HMS Seal
- Builder: Laird, Son & Co., Birkenhead
- Laid down: 17 June 1896
- Launched: 6 March 1897
- Completed: May 1898
- Fate: Scrapped, 1921

General characteristics
- Class & type: Earnest-class destroyer
- Displacement: 395 long tons (401 t)
- Length: 210 ft (64 m)
- Beam: 21.5 ft (6.6 m)
- Draught: 9.75 ft (3.0 m)
- Propulsion: Vertical triple-expansion steam engines; Coal-fired Normand boilers; 6,300 hp (4,698 kW)
- Speed: 30 knots (56 km/h; 35 mph)
- Complement: 63
- Armament: 1 × QF 12-pounder gun; 2 × 18 inch (450 mm) torpedo tubes

HMS Seal was a B-class torpedo boat destroyer of the British Royal Navy. She was completed by Laird, Son & Company, Birkenhead, in 1897.

== Design and construction ==
Seal was ordered on 9 January 1896 as the fifth of six 30-knotter destroyers programmed to be built by Lairds under the 1895–1896 programme. These followed on from four very similar destroyers ordered from Lairds as part of the 1894–1895 programme.

Seal was 218 feet (66.4 m) long overall and 213 feet (64.9 m) between perpendiculars, with a beam of 21 feet 6 inches (6.55 m) and a draught of 9 feet 9 inches (2.97 m). Displacement was 355 long tons (361 t) light and 415 long tons (422 t) full load. Like the other Laird-built 30-knotters, Seal was propelled by two triple expansion steam engines, fed by four Normand boilers, rated at 6,300 ihp (4,700 kW), and was fitted with four funnels.

Armament was the standard for the 30-knotters, i.e. a QF 12 pounder 12 cwt (3 in (76 mm) calibre) gun on a platform on the ship's conning tower (in practice the platform was also used as the ship's bridge), with a secondary armament of five 6-pounder guns, and two 18-inch (450 mm) torpedo tubes.

Seal was laid down on 17 June 1896 as yard number 625 and was launched on 6 March 1897. On 24 January 1898 she carried out final sea trials, reaching an average speed of 30.79 kn (35.43 mph; 57.02 km/h) over the measured mile and 30.15 knots (55.84 km/h; 34.70 mph) on a three-hour continuous run. Seal commissioned in May 1898.

== Service ==
Lieutenant Arthur John Payne was appointed in command in September 1899, and she was commissioned as part of the Devonport Destroyer Instructional Flotilla. In February 1900 she was slightly damaged while in the Falmouth harbour when the destroyer Fairy dragged her moorings and drifted into several of the other ships of the flotilla. Lieutenant Victor Gallafent Gurner was appointed in command on 1 March 1900. She was scheduled for a commission on the Mediterranean station in December 1901, but owing to defects her place was taken by Flying Fish. She underwent repairs to re-tube her boilers during Spring 1902, and Lieutenant Harry Charles John Roberts West was appointed in command from 2 September, when she did commission at Devonport for the Mediterranean station. Arriving at Malta, she became tender to HMS Orion, depot ship for torpedo boats.

In January 1907 Seal was part of the Second Destroyer Flotilla and was under repair at Chatham Dockyard.

On 30 August 1912 the Admiralty directed all destroyers were to be grouped into classes designated by letters based on contract speed and appearance. As a four-funneled 30-knotter destroyer, Seal was assigned to the B class. In 1912, older destroyers were organised into Patrol Flotillas, with Seal being part of the 7th Flotilla, based at Devonport, in March 1913. Seal remained part of the 7th Flotilla on the eve of the First World War in July 1914.

At the outbreak of war, the 7th Flotilla was redeployed to the Humber River for operations off the East coast of Britain. Duties of the Flotilla were to prevent enemy ships from carrying out minelaying or torpedo attacks in the approaches to ports on the East coast, and to prevent raids by enemy ships. Seal remained part of the 7th Flotilla, now employed on convoy escort duties, but by September that year had transferred to the local defence flotilla at the Nore. Seal was still at the Nore in January 1918, but by March that year had transferred to the Irish Sea Flotilla.

== Bibliography ==
- Brassey, T. A., ed. (1898). The Naval Annual 1898. Portsmouth, UK: J Griffin and Co.
- Chesneau, Roger & Kolesnik, Eugene M., eds. (1979). Conway's All The World's Fighting Ships 1860–1905. London: Conway Maritime Press. ISBN 0-85177-133-5.
- Colledge, J. J.; Warlow, Ben (2006) [1969]. Ships of the Royal Navy: The Complete Record of All Fighting Ships of the Royal Navy from the 15th Century to the Present (3rd Rev ed.). London: Chatham Publishing. ISBN 978-1-86176-281-8. OCLC 67375475.
- Corbett, Julian S. (1920). History of the Great War: Naval Operations: Vol. I: To the Battle of the Falklands December 1914. London: Longmans, Green and Co.
- Dittmar, F.J.; Colledge, J.J. (1972). British Warships 1914–1919. Shepperton, UK: Ian Allan. ISBN 0-7110-0380-7.
- Friedman, Norman (2009). British Destroyers: From Earliest Days to the Second World War. Barnsley, UK: Seaforth Publishing. ISBN 978-1-84832-049-9.
- Gardiner, Robert & Gray, Randal, eds. (1985). Conway's All The World's Fighting Ships 1906–1921. London: Conway Maritime Press. ISBN 0-85177-245-5.
- Lyon, David (2001) [1996]. The First Destroyers. London: Caxton Editions. ISBN 1-84067-3648.
- Manning, T. D. (1961). The British Destroyer. London: Putnam & Co. OCLC 6470051.
- March, Edgar J. (1966). British Destroyers: A History of Development, 1892–1953; Drawn by Admiralty Permission From Official Records & Returns, Ships' Covers & Building Plans. London: Seeley Service. OCLC 164893555.
- Monograph No. 7: The Patrol Flotillas at the Commencement of the War (PDF). Naval Staff Monographs (Historical). Vol. III. The Naval Staff, Training and Staff Duties Division. 1921. pp. 71–107.
