= B-class destroyer (1913) =

British destroyer class

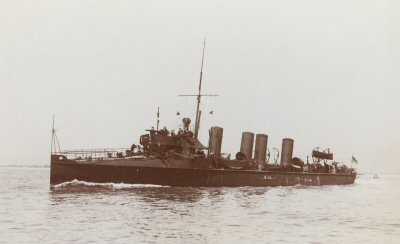
- HMS Arab at sea

Class overview
- Operators: Royal Navy
- Preceded by: A class "27-Knotters"
- Succeeded by: River or E class
- Built: 1895–1907
- In commission: 1895–1921
- Completed: 24
- Lost: 4
- Scrapped: 20

General characteristics
- Type: Torpedo boat destroyer
- Displacement: 350 long tons (356 t)
- Length: 210 ft (64 m)
- Installed power: Coal-fired water-tube boilers
- Propulsion: Triple-expansion steam engines; and/or; Steam turbines
- Speed: 30–36 knots (56–67 km/h; 35–41 mph)
- Complement: 63–69
- Armament: 1 × QF 12-pounder gun; 5 × QF 6-pounder guns; 2 × 18-inch (450 mm) torpedo tubes

The B class as designated in 1913 was a heterogeneous group of torpedo boat destroyers (TBDs) built for the Royal Navy in the late 1890s. They were constructed to the individual designs of their builders to meet Admiralty specifications, the uniting feature being a specified top speed of 30 knots (56 km/h) and four funnels, although the funnel spacings differed between ships. All "30 knotter" vessels with four funnels were classified by the Admiralty as the B class in 1913 to provide some system to the naming of HM destroyers. At the same time all "30 knotter" vessels with three funnels were classified by the Admiralty as the C class and those with two funnels became the D class.

Fourteen vessels were built by Laird Brothers at Birkenhead (in 1903 to become part of Cammell Laird, Birkenhead), seven by Palmers Shipbuilding and Iron Company at Hebburn-on-Tyne, and one each by Armstrong Whitworth at Walker-on-Tyne, William Doxford and Sons at Sunderland, and J & G Thomson (later to become John Brown and Company) at Clydebank. All vessels had a distinctive "turtleback" forecastle that was intended to clear water from the bow, but actually tended to dig the bow into anything of a sea, resulting in a very wet conning position.

They generally displaced around 350 tons, one third more than the preceding A class, giving an increase in speed of 3 knots (5.6 km/h) over the "27 knotters". Length was around 210 feet (64 m). All were powered by triple expansion steam engines and had coal-fired water-tube boilers. However, Albacore, Arab, Bonetta, Cobra and Express were builder's specials, and had steam turbines fitted in addition to, or in lieu of, the reciprocating engines, giving 6,000 shaft horsepower (4,500 kW) to 9,000 shaft horsepower (6,700 kW) for 26.75 to 31 knots (49.54 to 57.41 km/h). Armament was one QF 12-pounder gun on a raised platform at the rear of the forecastle, five QF 6-pounder guns (two sited abreast the conning tower, two sited between the funnels and one on the quarterdeck) and 2 single torpedo tubes for 18-inch (450 mm) torpedoes.

The last two Palmers boats, built in 1908, were replacements for the River-class Gala and the C-class Tiger that had collided and sunk that year. They were generally similar to the River (or E-class) design, but were grouped with the B class as they possessed four funnels and were similarly armed, and made 27 knots (50 km/h) on turbines.

== Ships ==
- Quail class (all built by Laird, Birkenhead under the 1894–95 programme)
  - Quail, launched 24 September 1895, sold for breaking up 23 July 1919.
  - Sparrowhawk, launched 8 October 1895, wrecked off the Yangtze 17 June 1904.
  - Thrasher, launched 5 November 1895, sold for breaking up 4 November 1919.
  - Virago, launched 19 November 1895, sold for breaking up 10 October 1919.
- Earnest class (all built by Laird, Birkenhead under the 1895–96 programme)
  - Earnest, launched 7 November 1896, sold for breaking up 7 January 1920.
  - Griffon, launched 21 November 1896, sold for breaking up 7 January 1920.
  - Locust, launched 5 December 1896, sold for breaking up 6 October 1919.
  - Panther, launched 21 January 1897, sold for breaking up 7 June 1920.
  - Seal, launched 6 March 1897, sold for breaking up 17 March 1921.
  - Wolf, launched 2 June 1897, sold for breaking up 1 July 1921.
- Express (built by Laird, Birkenhead as a steam-turbine powered "special" – under the 1896–97 programme)
  - Express, launched 11 December 1897, sold for breaking up 17 March 1920.
- Orwell (built by Laird, Birkenhead under the 1897–98 programme)
  - Orwell, launched 29 September 1898, sold for breaking up 1 July 1920.
- Lively class (both built by Laird, Birkenhead under the 1899–1900 programme)
  - Lively, launched 14 July 1900, sold for breaking up 1 July 1921.
  - Sprightly, launched 25 August 1900, sold for breaking up 1 July 1921.
- Success (built by Doxford, Sunderland under the 1899–1900 programme)
  - Success, launched 21 March 1901, wrecked off Fife Ness 27 December 1914, becoming the first wartime destroyer loss.
- Palmers 4-funnelled group (built by Palmers, Jarrow, Spiteful ordered under the 1897–98 programme, three purchased under the 1899–1900 Estimates and the Kangaroo purchased under a supplementary programme for 1900–01)
  - Spiteful, launched 11 January 1899, sold for breaking up 14 September 1920.
  - Peterel, launched 30 March 1899, sold for breaking up 30 August 1919.
  - Myrmidon, launched 26 May 1900, rammed and sunk by SS Hambourn in the English Channel, 26 March 1917.
  - Syren, launched 20 December 1900, sold for breaking up 14 September 1920.
  - Kangaroo, launched 29 December 1899 and purchased in July 1901, sold for breaking up 23 March 1920.
- Arab (built by J & G Thomson, Clydebank as a high-speed "special" under the 1896–97 programme)
  - Arab, launched 9 February 1901, sold for breaking up 23 July 1919.
- Cobra (built by Armstrong Whitworth, Elswick as a steam-turbine powered "special")
  - Cobra, launched 28 June 1899 and purchased 8 May 1900, wrecked while on delivery voyage 19 September 1901.
- Palmers final group (steam turbine powered)
  - Albacore, launched 9 October 1906 and purchased 3 May 1909, sold for breaking up 1 August 1919.
  - Bonetta, launched 14 January 1907 and purchased 3 May 1909, sold for breaking up 7 June 1920.

== See also ==
- C-class destroyer (1913)
- D-class destroyer (1913)

== Bibliography ==
- Chesneau, Roger & Kolesnik, Eugene M., eds. (1979). Conway's All The World's Fighting Ships 1860–1905. London: Conway Maritime Press. ISBN 0-85177-133-5.
- Colledge, J. J.; Warlow, Ben (2006) [1969]. Ships of the Royal Navy: The Complete Record of All Fighting Ships of the Royal Navy from the 15th Century to the Present (3rd Rev ed.). London: Chatham Publishing. ISBN 978-1-86176-281-8. OCLC 67375475.
- Dittmar, F.J.; Colledge, J. J. (1972). British Warships 1914–1919. Shepperton, UK: Ian Allan. ISBN 0-7110-0380-7.
- Friedman, Norman (2009). British Destroyers: From Earliest Days to the Second World War. Barnsley, UK: Seaforth Publishing. ISBN 978-1-84832-049-9.
- Gardiner, Robert & Gray, Randal, eds. (1985). Conway's All The World's Fighting Ships 1906–1921. London: Conway Maritime Press. ISBN 0-85177-245-5.
- Lyon, David (2001) [1996]. The First Destroyers. London: Caxton Editions. ISBN 1-84067-364-8.
- Manning, T. D. (1961). The British Destroyer. London: Putnam & Co. OCLC 6470051.
- March, Edgar J. (1966). British Destroyers: A History of Development, 1892–1953; Drawn by Admiralty Permission From Official Records & Returns, Ships' Covers & Building Plans. London: Seeley Service. OCLC 164893555.
