= Earnest-class destroyer =

Class overview
- Name: Earnest class
- Builders: Laird, Son & Co., Birkenhead
- Operators: Royal Navy
- Built: 1896–98
- In commission: 1895–1919
- Completed: 6
- Scrapped: 6

General characteristics
- Type: Torpedo boat destroyer
- Displacement: 395 long tons (401 t)
- Length: 213 ft (64.9 m)
- Beam: 21.5 ft (6.6 m)
- Draught: 9.75 ft (3.0 m)
- Installed power: 6,300 ihp (4,698 kW)
- Propulsion: Triple expansion steam engines; Coal-fired Normand boilers
- Speed: 30 knots (56 km/h; 35 mph)
- Complement: 63
- Armament: 1 × QF 12-pounder gun; 2 × 18 inch (450 mm) torpedo tubes

Six Earnest-class destroyers served with the Royal Navy: Earnest, Griffon, Locust, Panther, Seal and Wolf. These ships were all built by Cammell Laird and were part of the class of 'thirty knotters'.

Concern about the higher speeds of foreign boats had prompted to Admiralty to order new destroyers capable of 30 knots (56 km/h), rather than the 27-knot (50 km/h) requirement which had been standard. The boats were not able to make this speed in bad weather, where they were usually wet and uncomfortable with cramped crew quarters, but they proved their toughness in serving through World War I, despite being twenty years old. Thanks to their watertight bulkheads, their thin plating and light structure they were able to take a great deal of damage and remain afloat, although their plates buckled easily, affecting their handling.

The ships were fitted with Normand boilers which generated around 6,300 horsepower (4,700 kW). They were armed with the standard 12-pounder gun and two torpedo tubes and carried a complement of 63 officers and ratings.

In 1913 the Ernest class, along with all other surviving "30 knotter" vessels with 4 funnels, were classified by the Admiralty as the B-class to provide some system to the naming of HM destroyers (at the same time, the 3-funnelled, "30 knotters" became the C-class and the 2-funnelled ships the D-class).

== Bibliography ==
- Chesneau, Roger & Kolesnik, Eugene M., eds. (1979). Conway's All The World's Fighting Ships 1860–1905. London: Conway Maritime Press. ISBN 0-85177-133-5.
- Colledge, J. J.; Warlow, Ben (2006) [1969]. Ships of the Royal Navy: The Complete Record of All Fighting Ships of the Royal Navy from the 15th Century to the Present (3rd Rev ed.). London: Chatham Publishing. ISBN 978-1-86176-281-8. OCLC 67375475.
- Friedman, Norman (2009). British Destroyers: From Earliest Days to the Second World War. Barnsley, UK: Seaforth Publishing. ISBN 978-1-84832-049-9.
- Gardiner, Robert & Gray, Randal, eds. (1985). Conway's All The World's Fighting Ships 1906–1921. London: Conway Maritime Press. ISBN 0-85177-245-5.
- Lyon, David (2001) [1996]. The First Destroyers. London: Caxton Editions. ISBN 1-84067-364-8.
- Manning, Thomas Davys (1961). The British Destroyer. Putnam & Co. OCLC 6470051.
- March, Edgar J. (1966). British Destroyers: A History of Development, 1892–1953; Drawn by Admiralty Permission From Official Records & Returns, Ships' Covers & Building Plans. London: Seeley Service. OCLC 164893555.
