= Naming conventions for destroyers of the Royal Navy =

In the Royal Navy there have been a variety of naming conventions for destroyers.

== Origins ==
Destroyers were originally developed as a defence against torpedo boats, and the first torpedo boat destroyer (TBD) in the Royal Navy was HMS Havock of 1893. From 1906, the term "torpedo boat destroyer" began to appear in the shortened form "destroyer" when referring to destroyer flotillas. There is no official Admiralty order pertaining to the change and the abbreviated term "TBD" is present in the Navy List up to 1919, even though destroyer was the term used in most official orders from 1917.

Up to 1913, names were allocated under no fixed system, leading to a heterogeneous array, although two groups were named systematically; after rivers and tribes (later the E and F classes, respectively). In 1913, with burgeoning numbers of TBDs, the Admiralty took the confusing situation in hand; Havock and her similar "27 knotter" sisters with two shafts were grouped as the A class, and similar groups of "30 knotter" TBDs were grouped as the B class (four-funneled ships), C class (three funnels) and D class (two funnels). Later classes of ships were grouped as the E to K classes, although there was no J class. These are ships that the observer would recognize as being the forerunners of the modern destroyer, with the turtleback and low conning tower replaced by a forecastle and wheelhouse with a compass platform above.

== Based on class names ==
The last class of ships built with mixed names were the Acasta or K class of the 1911–1912 program. From the L class of the 1912–1913 program onwards, ships took the initial letter of their name from the class letter, although large classes such as the M, R, and S were allocated more than one initial letter. Flotilla leaders were generally named after famed historical (and generally, naval) characters and vessels building for other countries that had been commandeered for the Royal Navy were not allocated into the letter system (e.g. ex-Turkish ships received "T" names and ex-Greek ships "M" names with a Greek mythology theme).

== The interwar standard ==
Post war, flotillas were ordered as eight ships and a separate leader (later seven ships and a leader, later eight ships and no specialised leader). Each class was allocated an initial letter from which names were taken, and leaders were again often named after historical figures. These ships, up to the I class, are known as the "interwar standard". Again, vessels appropriated from other nations were not allocated into the class letter system, but took letter names of similar Royal Navy designs.

The programme of 1936 produced sufficiently novel ships to warrant a change in convention; "tribal" names again being applied, although subsequent ships returned to the letter system. The O through Z classes were ordered under the War Emergency Programme. Having exhausted the alphabet, the next emergency flotillas returned to the next unused letter start of the alphabet. This was C, the C class of 1930 having been completely transferred to the Royal Canadian Navy. As five flotillas were ordered, groups of two initial letters were used; Ca-, Ch-, Co-, Cr- and Ce-, although the latter flotilla was later cancelled.

== Themes ==
The proposed G class of 1943 were the penultimate ships to be allocated letter names, after this systematic themes for names were adopted; Battles, Weapons, Counties and Towns. The exception was the Daring class of 1949 with names beginning with D. Since the County class of 1959, type numbers have also been allocated to destroyers.

== Back to letters ==
The Type 45 destroyers, the Royal Navy's latest vessels of this type, have resurrected the letter naming convention, taking D names, and repeating some of the previous Daring class.

== See also ==
- Type system of the Royal Navy
