= Quail-class destroyer =

Class overview
- Name: Quail class
- Builders: Laird, Son & Co., Birkenhead
- Operators: Royal Navy
- Preceded by: Zebra class
- Succeeded by: Earnest class
- Built: 1895
- In commission: 1895–1919
- Completed: 4
- Lost: 1
- Scrapped: 3

General characteristics
- Type: Torpedo boat destroyer
- Displacement: 350 long tons (356 t)
- Length: 210 ft (64 m)
- Propulsion: Triple expansion steam engines; Coal-fired Normand boilers; 6,300 hp (4,698 kW)
- Speed: 30 knots (56 km/h; 35 mph)
- Complement: 63
- Armament: 1 × QF 12-pounder gun; 2 × 18 inch (450 mm) torpedo tubes

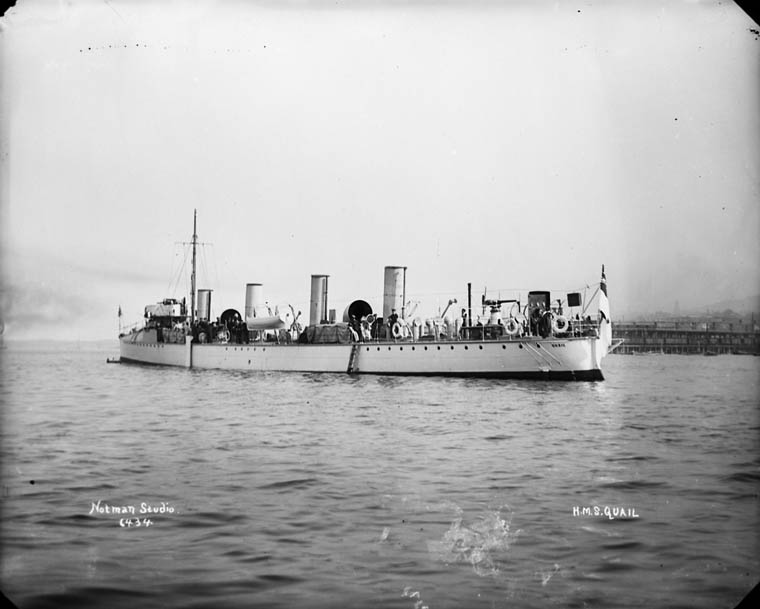
H.M.S. "Quail", North America and West Indies Squadron, Halifax, Nova Scotia, Canada

Four Quail-class destroyers served with the Royal Navy. These ships were all built by Laird, Son & Co. and were the first of the 'thirty knotters'.

Concern about the higher speeds of foreign boats had prompted to Admiralty to order new destroyers capable of 30 knots, rather than the 27 knot requirement which had been standard. The boats were not able to make this speed in bad weather, where they were usually wet and uncomfortable with cramped crew quarters, but they proved their toughness in serving through the Great War, despite being twenty years old. Thanks to their watertight bulkheads, their thin plating and light structure they were able to take a great deal of damage and remain afloat, although their plates buckled easily, affecting their handling.

The ships were fitted with Normand boilers which generated around 6,300 HP. They were armed with the standard twelve pounder and two torpedo tubes and carried a complement of 63 officers and men.

In 1913 the Quail class (with the exception of Sparrowhawk lost in 1904), along with all other surviving "30 knotter" vessels with 4 funnels, were classified by the Admiralty as the B-class to provide some system to the naming of HM destroyers (at the same time, the 3-funnelled, "30 knotters" became the C-class and the 2-funnelled ships the D-class).

== Ships ==
- Quail, launched 24 September 1895, sold for disposal 23 July 1919.
- Sparrowhawk, launched 8 October 1895, wrecked 17 June 1904.
- Thrasher, launched 5 November 1895, sold for disposal 1919.
- Virago, launched 19 November 1895, sold for disposal 10 October 1919.

== Bibliography ==
- Chesneau, Roger & Kolesnik, Eugene M., eds. (1979). Conway's All The World's Fighting Ships 1860–1905. London: Conway Maritime Press. ISBN 0-85177-133-5.
- Colledge, J. J.; Warlow, Ben (2006) [1969]. Ships of the Royal Navy: The Complete Record of All Fighting Ships of the Royal Navy from the 15th Century to the Present (3rd Rev ed.). London: Chatham Publishing. ISBN 978-1-86176-281-8. OCLC 67375475.
- Dittmar, F.J.; Colledge, J.J. (1972). British Warships 1914–1919. Shepperton, UK: Ian Allan. ISBN 0-7110-0380-7.
- Friedman, Norman (2009). British Destroyers: From Earliest Days to the Second World War. Barnsley, UK: Seaforth Publishing. ISBN 978-1-84832-049-9.
- Gardiner, Robert & Gray, Randal, eds. (1985). Conway's All The World's Fighting Ships 1906–1921. London: Conway Maritime Press. ISBN 0-85177-245-5.
- Lyon, David (2001) [1996]. The First Destroyers. London: Caxton Editions. ISBN 1-84067-3648.
- Manning, T. D. (1961). The British Destroyer. London: Putnam & Co. OCLC 6470051.
- March, Edgar J. (1966). British Destroyers: A History of Development, 1892–1953; Drawn by Admiralty Permission From Official Records & Returns, Ships' Covers & Building Plans. London: Seeley Service. OCLC 164893555.
