= List of ships built at John I. Thornycroft & Company, Chiswick =

This is a list of ships built by John I. Thornycroft & Company at the yard at Chiswick, England. Production of larger ships moved to the yard at Woolston in 1904 and production at Chiswick ceased in 1909.

== Ships and boats ==
Some early boats are not yet documented online. A large part of the information has been provided by the Miramar Ship Index (www.miramarshipindex.org.nz) through a Wikipedia partnership. However, the official lists of vessels built by Thornycroft (at both Chiswick and at Woolston) are available in the unpublished (but officially recognised) Thornycroft List of 1981 researched and compiled by the late David Lyon with assistance of Thornycroft personnel and the company's archives.

Completed	Name	Yard No	Tonnage	Description	Illustration
1862	Nautilus	#1		This small steam launch of 9.5 knots was Thornycroft's first vessel, begun in 1859, when he was just 16. In 1862 it was the only boat that was able to follow the rovers of the University race, giving Thornycroft some publicity.	
1863	Ariel	#2		There may have been two Ariels. Banbury (page 283) lists a wooden launch as Yard No. 2, while The Engineer of 4 November 1870 describes a steel yacht "built some time ago".	
1863	unnamed punt	#3		10 ft works Punt.	
1863	Slaney	#4		Steam launch. The Royal Museums at Greenwich have the plans, but not much else is available online.	
1866	Waterlily	#5		Iron launch, capable of 7.8 knots. Preserved as part of the National Historic Fleet. It was used by Thomas Thornycroft, father of John I. Thornycroft.	
1866	Idler	#6		Steam Launch. The Royal Museums at Greenwich have the plans, but not much else is available online.	
1870	Swallow	#7		Capable of 16.2 knots.	
1870	Scolopendra	#8		Steam launch. Apparently a sister to Cygnet. The Royal Museums at Greenwich have the plans, but not much else is available online.	
1870	Cygnet	#9	1.5	Small steam launch, preserved and displayed by The Tamesis Trust.	
1871	Miranda	#10	3.7	A fast steam yacht with lines that set the precedent for torpedo boats in the following years.	
1871	Canopus	#11		Open launch. The Royal Museums at Greenwich have the plans, but not much else is available online.	
1872	Belvedere	#12		Capable of 15.6 knots.	
1872	Sphinx	#13			
1872	O.E.A.	#15		Launch of 15 metres (50 ft) or 17 metres (57 ft), capable of 14¾ knots.	
1872	Maid of All Work or Maid of Homour	#16		Open launch, capable of 10.5 knots.	
1872	Sylvia	#17		Boat of 14 metres (45 ft), capable of 10.5 knots.	
1873	Sir Arthur Cotton	#18		A fast launch, cited at 21.4 knots and claimed in 1874 to be the fastest vessel in the world.	
1873	Firefly	#14		There was more than one Firefly (#14 & #19) plus two further vessels of the #19 design. Engineering had two articles in 1873 about a vessel from that year, length 16 metres (53 ft) and with a speed of 16.46 knots (18.94 mph). The 1873 yacht was apparently sold to Russia and converted into a torpedo boat.	
1873	Firefly	#19		There was more than one Firefly (#14 & #19) plus two further vessels of the #19 design. Engineering had two articles in 1873 about a vessel from that year, length 16 metres (53 ft) and with a speed of 16.46 knots (18.94 mph). The 1873 yacht was apparently sold to Russia and converted into a torpedo boat.	
1873	Yard No. 20	#20		There was more than one Firefly (#14 & #19) plus two further vessels of the #19 design. Engineering had two articles in 1873 about a vessel from that year, length 16 metres (53 ft) and with a speed of 16.46 knots (18.94 mph). The 1873 yacht was apparently sold to Russia and converted into a torpedo boat.	
1873	Yard No. 21	#21		There was more than one Firefly (#14 & #19) plus two further vessels of the #19 design. Engineering had two articles in 1873 about a vessel from that year, length 16 metres (53 ft) and with a speed of 16.46 knots (18.94 mph). The 1873 yacht was apparently sold to Russia and converted into a torpedo boat.	
1874	unnamed punt	#22			
1873	Rap	#23	10	The Norwegian torpedo boat Rap (Known as the Maelstrom before delivery) was the first in a long series of small fast boats built of steel for naval service. The boat has been preserved at the Royal Norwegian Navy Museum at Horten.	
1874	unnamed launch	#24			
1874	Admiralty No.58	#25		A pinnace for the Royal Navy, capable of 9.2 knots.	
1874	Choutka	#26		Built of steel and capable of 16.9 knots. Bought by Russia and served as a torpedo boat.	
1874	#Dragonfly	#27		Launch, capable of 18 knots.	
1874	Minnie	30		Launch yachts. The Royal Museums at Greenwich have the plans, but not much else is available online.	
1874	Gamecock	31		Launch yachts. The Royal Museums at Greenwich have the plans, but not much else is available online.	
1874	Eva	34		Launch, ordered by the Henley Royal Regatta as an umpire's launch. Used 1874–1876 and then sold. The 14-metre (45 ft) long vessel was built of iron and quoted at 13 knots (15 mph). The photo shows her being restored at the Kew Steam Museum. Since 1996 part of the River & Rowing Museum at Henley.	
1874	Marie	35		Launch Yacht. The Royal Museums at Greenwich have the plans, but not much else is available online.	
1874	Wildfire	36		Launch Yacht. The Royal Museums at Greenwich have the plans, but not much else is available online.	
1875	Spring	29	15	The first Swedish torpedo boat, and like Rap designed for spar torpedoes.	
1875	Torpedoboot I	32	10	A spar torpedo boat for Austria-Hungary. Gogg gives it speed as 13 knots, while Banbury credits it with 18.2 knots.	
1875	Dampchalup Nr. 5	33	8	A third Rap-type vessel, this time for Denmark. The proposed armament with spar torpedoes never materialized, and instead it was first supplied with towed torpedoes and later with dropping gear for two 35 cm (14-inch) torpedoes.	
1876	Gitana	37		This fast yacht was built for Baroness A. de Rothschild and intended for service on Lake Geneva. The 27-metre (90 ft) long vessel did 20.76 knots (23.89 mph) on her trials.	
1876	Torpilleur 5	43	12	Two spar torpedo boats for France, capable of 18 knots.	
1876	Torpilleur 6	44	12	Two spar torpedo boats for France, capable of 18 knots.	
1876	Torpedoboot I	48	20	A spar torpedo boat for The Netherlands, capable of 18 knots.	
1877	HMS Lightning	47	32	Initially equipped with spar torpedoes, from 1879 with a torpedo tube. Speed 18.5 knots. The 25.8 metres (84.6 ft) (26.5 metres (87.0 ft) overall) design was close to that of Gitana.	
1877	Torpediniere I	60	30	This boat for Italy was briefly described in Engineering on 8 June 1877 as being considered for Whitehead torpedoes. But it seems that a spar torpedo installation was chosen instead.	
1878	Torpilleur 8	54	26	A series of spar torpedo boats for France. Measuring 26.6 metres (87.2 ft) overall, they were similar to HMS Lightning. The Engineer reported the speed trials for the first six, ranging from 18.4 to 19.4 knots. Number 10, 16 and 19 were later fitted with torpedo tubes.	
1878	Torpilleur 9	55	26	A series of spar torpedo boats for France. Measuring 26.6 metres (87.2 ft) overall, they were similar to HMS Lightning. The Engineer reported the speed trials for the first six, ranging from 18.4 to 19.4 knots. Number 10, 16 and 19 were later fitted with torpedo tubes.	
1878	Torpilleur 10	56	26	A series of spar torpedo boats for France. Measuring 26.6 metres (87.2 ft) overall, they were similar to HMS Lightning. The Engineer reported the speed trials for the first six, ranging from 18.4 to 19.4 knots. Number 10, 16 and 19 were later fitted with torpedo tubes.	
1878	Torpilleur 11	57	26	A series of spar torpedo boats for France. Measuring 26.6 metres (87.2 ft) overall, they were similar to HMS Lightning. The Engineer reported the speed trials for the first six, ranging from 18.4 to 19.4 knots. Number 10, 16 and 19 were later fitted with torpedo tubes.	
1878	Torpilleur 12	58	26	A series of spar torpedo boats for France. Measuring 26.6 metres (87.2 ft) overall, they were similar to HMS Lightning. The Engineer reported the speed trials for the first six, ranging from 18.4 to 19.4 knots. Number 10, 16 and 19 were later fitted with torpedo tubes.	
1878	Torpilleur 13	59	26	A series of spar torpedo boats for France. Measuring 26.6 metres (87.2 ft) overall, they were similar to HMS Lightning. The Engineer reported the speed trials for the first six, ranging from 18.4 to 19.4 knots. Number 10, 16 and 19 were later fitted with torpedo tubes.	
1878	Torpilleur 14	63	26	A series of spar torpedo boats for France. Measuring 26.6 metres (87.2 ft) overall, they were similar to HMS Lightning. The Engineer reported the speed trials for the first six, ranging from 18.4 to 19.4 knots. Number 10, 16 and 19 were later fitted with torpedo tubes.	
1878	Torpilleur 15	64	26	A series of spar torpedo boats for France. Measuring 26.6 metres (87.2 ft) overall, they were similar to HMS Lightning. The Engineer reported the speed trials for the first six, ranging from 18.4 to 19.4 knots. Number 10, 16 and 19 were later fitted with torpedo tubes.	
1878	Torpilleur 16	65	26	A series of spar torpedo boats for France. Measuring 26.6 metres (87.2 ft) overall, they were similar to HMS Lightning. The Engineer reported the speed trials for the first six, ranging from 18.4 to 19.4 knots. Number 10, 16 and 19 were later fitted with torpedo tubes.	
1878	Torpilleur 17	66	26	A series of spar torpedo boats for France. Measuring 26.6 metres (87.2 ft) overall, they were similar to HMS Lightning. The Engineer reported the speed trials for the first six, ranging from 18.4 to 19.4 knots. Number 10, 16 and 19 were later fitted with torpedo tubes.	
1878	Torpilleur 18	67	26	A series of spar torpedo boats for France. Measuring 26.6 metres (87.2 ft) overall, they were similar to HMS Lightning. The Engineer reported the speed trials for the first six, ranging from 18.4 to 19.4 knots. Number 10, 16 and 19 were later fitted with torpedo tubes.	
1878	Torpilleur 19	68	26	A series of spar torpedo boats for France. Measuring 26.6 metres (87.2 ft) overall, they were similar to HMS Lightning. The Engineer reported the speed trials for the first six, ranging from 18.4 to 19.4 knots. Number 10, 16 and 19 were later fitted with torpedo tubes.	
1878	Torpedoboot II	69	28	A torpedo boat for Austria-Hungary, and their first with torpedo tubes. At 26.5 metres (87.0 ft) it was similar in size to the French series of boats. Gogg gives it speed as 15 knots, while Chesneau credits it with 18.2 knots.	
1878 - 1879	HMTB 2	71	28	A series of torpedo boats for the Royal Navy. Measuring 26.3 metres (86.4 ft), they were almost identical to HMS Lightning (which was renamed HM TB 1), except that the Gitana-style cabin roof was discarded. They had a trainable torpedo tube on the bow, but that was later replaced by dropping gear for two torpedoes midships.	
1878 - 1879	HMTB 3	72	28	A series of torpedo boats for the Royal Navy. Measuring 26.3 metres (86.4 ft), they were almost identical to HMS Lightning (which was renamed HM TB 1), except that the Gitana-style cabin roof was discarded. They had a trainable torpedo tube on the bow, but that was later replaced by dropping gear for two torpedoes midships.	
1878 - 1879	HMTB 4	73	28	A series of torpedo boats for the Royal Navy. Measuring 26.3 metres (86.4 ft), they were almost identical to HMS Lightning (which was renamed HM TB 1), except that the Gitana-style cabin roof was discarded. They had a trainable torpedo tube on the bow, but that was later replaced by dropping gear for two torpedoes midships.	
1878 - 1879	HMTB 5	74	28	A series of torpedo boats for the Royal Navy. Measuring 26.3 metres (86.4 ft), they were almost identical to HMS Lightning (which was renamed HM TB 1), except that the Gitana-style cabin roof was discarded. They had a trainable torpedo tube on the bow, but that was later replaced by dropping gear for two torpedoes midships.	
1878 - 1879	HMTB 6	75	28	A series of torpedo boats for the Royal Navy. Measuring 26.3 metres (86.4 ft), they were almost identical to HMS Lightning (which was renamed HM TB 1), except that the Gitana-style cabin roof was discarded. They had a trainable torpedo tube on the bow, but that was later replaced by dropping gear for two torpedoes midships.	
1878 - 1879	HMTB 7	76	28	A series of torpedo boats for the Royal Navy. Measuring 26.3 metres (86.4 ft), they were almost identical to HMS Lightning (which was renamed HM TB 1), except that the Gitana-style cabin roof was discarded. They had a trainable torpedo tube on the bow, but that was later replaced by dropping gear for two torpedoes midships.	
1878 - 1879	HMTB 8	77	28	A series of torpedo boats for the Royal Navy. Measuring 26.3 metres (86.4 ft), they were almost identical to HMS Lightning (which was renamed HM TB 1), except that the Gitana-style cabin roof was discarded. They had a trainable torpedo tube on the bow, but that was later replaced by dropping gear for two torpedoes midships.	
1878 - 1879	HMTB 9	78	28	A series of torpedo boats for the Royal Navy. Measuring 26.3 metres (86.4 ft), they were almost identical to HMS Lightning (which was renamed HM TB 1), except that the Gitana-style cabin roof was discarded. They had a trainable torpedo tube on the bow, but that was later replaced by dropping gear for two torpedoes midships.	
1879	HMTB 10	79	28	A variation of the Lightning design with a ram bow, making the boat longer (27.9 metres (91.5 ft) overall).	
1878 - 1879	HMTB 11	80	28	Two more of the HMTB 2 design.	
1878 - 1879	HMTB 12	81	28	Two more of the HMTB 2 design.	
1878 - 1879	HMTB 51	82	11	A series of smaller torpedo boats (introducing the concept of second class torpedo boats) for the Royal Navy. They carried their two torpedoes in dropping gear midships.	
1878 - 1879	HMTB 52	83	11	A series of smaller torpedo boats (introducing the concept of second class torpedo boats) for the Royal Navy. They carried their two torpedoes in dropping gear midships.	
1878 - 1879	HMTB 53	84	11	A series of smaller torpedo boats (introducing the concept of second class torpedo boats) for the Royal Navy. They carried their two torpedoes in dropping gear midships.	
1878 - 1879	HMTB 54	85	11	A series of smaller torpedo boats (introducing the concept of second class torpedo boats) for the Royal Navy. They carried their two torpedoes in dropping gear midships.	
1878 - 1879	HMTB 55	86	11	A series of smaller torpedo boats (introducing the concept of second class torpedo boats) for the Royal Navy. They carried their two torpedoes in dropping gear midships.	
1878 - 1879	HMTB 56	87	11	A series of smaller torpedo boats (introducing the concept of second class torpedo boats) for the Royal Navy. They carried their two torpedoes in dropping gear midships.	
1878 - 1879	HMTB 57	88	11	A series of smaller torpedo boats (introducing the concept of second class torpedo boats) for the Royal Navy. They carried their two torpedoes in dropping gear midships.	
1878 - 1879	HMTB 58	89	11	A series of smaller torpedo boats (introducing the concept of second class torpedo boats) for the Royal Navy. They carried their two torpedoes in dropping gear midships.	
1878 - 1879	HMTB 59	90	11	A series of smaller torpedo boats (introducing the concept of second class torpedo boats) for the Royal Navy. They carried their two torpedoes in dropping gear midships.	
1878 - 1879	HMTB 60	91	11	A series of smaller torpedo boats (introducing the concept of second class torpedo boats) for the Royal Navy. They carried their two torpedoes in dropping gear midships.	
1878 - 1879	HMTB 61	92	11	A series of smaller torpedo boats (introducing the concept of second class torpedo boats) for the Royal Navy. They carried their two torpedoes in dropping gear midships.	
1878 - 1879	HMTB 62	93	11	A series of smaller torpedo boats (introducing the concept of second class torpedo boats) for the Royal Navy. They carried their two torpedoes in dropping gear midships.	
1878 - 1879	Torpedoboot IV	94	20	A series of spar torpedo boats for the Royal Netherlands Navy. Measuring 24.1 metres (79.0 ft), they were slightly larger versions of the Torpedoboot I design.	
1878 - 1879	Torpedoboot V	95	20	A series of spar torpedo boats for the Royal Netherlands Navy. Measuring 24.1 metres (79.0 ft), they were slightly larger versions of the Torpedoboot I design.	
1878 - 1879	Torpedoboot VI	96	20	A series of spar torpedo boats for the Royal Netherlands Navy. Measuring 24.1 metres (79.0 ft), they were slightly larger versions of the Torpedoboot I design.	
1878 - 1879	Torpedoboot VII	97	20	A series of spar torpedo boats for the Royal Netherlands Navy. Measuring 24.1 metres (79.0 ft), they were slightly larger versions of the Torpedoboot I design.	
1878 - 1879	Torpedoboot VIII	98	20	A series of spar torpedo boats for the Royal Netherlands Navy. Measuring 24.1 metres (79.0 ft), they were slightly larger versions of the Torpedoboot I design.	
1878 - 1879	Torpedoboot IX	99	20	A series of spar torpedo boats for the Royal Netherlands Navy. Measuring 24.1 metres (79.0 ft), they were slightly larger versions of the Torpedoboot I design.	
1878	Vril	103		Open launch. The Royal Museums at Greenwich have the plans, but not much else is available online.	
1879	Torpilleur 29	100	8	The first batch of second class torpedo boats (Torpilleurs-vedettes) for France, capable of 16 knots. They measured 18.4 metres (60.4 ft)	
1879	Torpilleur 30	101	8	The first batch of second class torpedo boats (Torpilleurs-vedettes) for France, capable of 16 knots. They measured 18.4 metres (60.4 ft)	
1879	Torpedobaad Nr. 4	102	33	A development of the Lightning design for the navy of Denmark, 27.8 metres (91 ft), with a torpedo tube in the bow. Named Hajen in 1882.	
1880 - 1881	HMTB 64	104	13	A series of second class torpedo boats for the Royal Navy. Measuring 19.2 metres (63.0 ft) and fitted with dropping gear for two torpedoes.	
1880 - 1881	HMTB 65	105	13	A series of second class torpedo boats for the Royal Navy. Measuring 19.2 metres (63.0 ft) and fitted with dropping gear for two torpedoes.	
1880 - 1881	HMTB 66	106	13	A series of second class torpedo boats for the Royal Navy. Measuring 19.2 metres (63.0 ft) and fitted with dropping gear for two torpedoes.	
1880 - 1881	HMTB 67	107	13	A series of second class torpedo boats for the Royal Navy. Measuring 19.2 metres (63.0 ft) and fitted with dropping gear for two torpedoes.	
1880 - 1881	HMTB 68	108	13	A series of second class torpedo boats for the Royal Navy. Measuring 19.2 metres (63.0 ft) and fitted with dropping gear for two torpedoes.	
1880 - 1881	HMTB 69	109	13	A series of second class torpedo boats for the Royal Navy. Measuring 19.2 metres (63.0 ft) and fitted with dropping gear for two torpedoes.	
1880 - 1881	HMTB 70	110	13	A series of second class torpedo boats for the Royal Navy. Measuring 19.2 metres (63.0 ft) and fitted with dropping gear for two torpedoes.	
1880 - 1881	HMTB 71	111	13	A series of second class torpedo boats for the Royal Navy. Measuring 19.2 metres (63.0 ft) and fitted with dropping gear for two torpedoes.	
1880 - 1881	HMTB 72	112	13	A series of second class torpedo boats for the Royal Navy. Measuring 19.2 metres (63.0 ft) and fitted with dropping gear for two torpedoes.	
1880 - 1881	HMTB 73	113	13	A series of second class torpedo boats for the Royal Navy. Measuring 19.2 metres (63.0 ft) and fitted with dropping gear for two torpedoes.	
1880	Kefal	116	13	A small torpedo boat for Russia.	
1881	Torpedera No 1	114	11	Two spar torpedo boats for Argentina, 18.9 metres (62.1 ft) and 16 knots. The histarmar.com.ar website dates them to 1882 and credits them with 15.0 knots.	
1881	Torpedera No 2	115	11	Two spar torpedo boats for Argentina, 18.9 metres (62.1 ft) and 16 knots. The histarmar.com.ar website dates them to 1882 and credits them with 15.0 knots.	
1880 - 1882	HMTB 76	117	12	Another series of second class torpedo boats for the Royal Navy, this time with two torpedo tubes side by side in the bows.	
1880 - 1882	HMTB 77	118	12	Another series of second class torpedo boats for the Royal Navy, this time with two torpedo tubes side by side in the bows.	
1880 - 1882	HMTB 78	119	12	Another series of second class torpedo boats for the Royal Navy, this time with two torpedo tubes side by side in the bows.	
1880 - 1882	HMTB 79	120	12	Another series of second class torpedo boats for the Royal Navy, this time with two torpedo tubes side by side in the bows.	
1880 - 1882	HMTB 80	121	12	Another series of second class torpedo boats for the Royal Navy, this time with two torpedo tubes side by side in the bows.	
1880 - 1882	HMTB 81	122	12	Another series of second class torpedo boats for the Royal Navy, this time with two torpedo tubes side by side in the bows.	
1880 - 1882	HMTB 82	123	12	Another series of second class torpedo boats for the Royal Navy, this time with two torpedo tubes side by side in the bows.	
1880 - 1882	HMTB 83	124	12	Another series of second class torpedo boats for the Royal Navy, this time with two torpedo tubes side by side in the bows.	
1880 - 1882	HMTB 84	125	12	Another series of second class torpedo boats for the Royal Navy, this time with two torpedo tubes side by side in the bows.	
1880 - 1882	HMTB 85	126	12	Another series of second class torpedo boats for the Royal Navy, this time with two torpedo tubes side by side in the bows.	
1880 - 1882	HMTB 86	127	12	Another series of second class torpedo boats for the Royal Navy, this time with two torpedo tubes side by side in the bows.	
1880 - 1882	HMTB 87	128	12	Another series of second class torpedo boats for the Royal Navy, this time with two torpedo tubes side by side in the bows.	
1880 - 1882	HMTB 88	129	12	Another series of second class torpedo boats for the Royal Navy, this time with two torpedo tubes side by side in the bows.	
1880 - 1882	HMTB 89	130	12	Another series of second class torpedo boats for the Royal Navy, this time with two torpedo tubes side by side in the bows.	
1880 - 1882	HMTB 90	131	12	Another series of second class torpedo boats for the Royal Navy, this time with two torpedo tubes side by side in the bows.	
1880 - 1882	HMTB 91	132	12	Another series of second class torpedo boats for the Royal Navy, this time with two torpedo tubes side by side in the bows.	
1880 - 1882	HMTB 92	133	12	Another series of second class torpedo boats for the Royal Navy, this time with two torpedo tubes side by side in the bows.	
1880 - 1882	HMTB 93	134	12	Another series of second class torpedo boats for the Royal Navy, this time with two torpedo tubes side by side in the bows.	
1880 - 1882	HMTB 94	135	12	Another series of second class torpedo boats for the Royal Navy, this time with two torpedo tubes side by side in the bows.	
1880 - 1882	HMTB 95	136	12	Another series of second class torpedo boats for the Royal Navy, this time with two torpedo tubes side by side in the bows.	
1881	Torpilleur 58	137	10	Second class torpedo boats (Torpilleurs-vedettes) for France, capable of 16 knots. They measured 18.4 metres (60.4 ft)	
1881	Torpilleur 59	138	10	Second class torpedo boats (Torpilleurs-vedettes) for France, capable of 16 knots. They measured 18.4 metres (60.4 ft)	
1881	Aquila	139	34	Two torpedo boats for Italy, later named 23T and 24T. They measured 29 metres (96 ft) and had two 14-inch torpedo tubes.	
1881	Gabbiano	140	34	Two torpedo boats for Italy, later named 23T and 24T. They measured 29 metres (96 ft) and had two 14-inch torpedo tubes.	
1881	Torpedobaad Nr. 6	142	58	This torpedo boat for Denmark marked a significant increase in the size of Thornycroft's designs. It measured 33.5 metres (110.0 ft), was capable of 20.7 knots and had two torpedo tubes of the large 38 cm (15-inch) type in the bows. Named Sværdfisken in 1882.	
1882 - 1883	Aldebaran	143	38	A series of torpedo boats for Italy. They measured 30.5 metres (100.0 ft), did 21.4 knots on trials and had two 14-inch torpedo tubes in the bows. In 1886 they were renamed 26T-35T.	
1882 - 1883	Antares	144	38	A series of torpedo boats for Italy. They measured 30.5 metres (100.0 ft), did 21.4 knots on trials and had two 14-inch torpedo tubes in the bows. In 1886 they were renamed 26T-35T.	
1882 - 1883	Andromeda	145	38	A series of torpedo boats for Italy. They measured 30.5 metres (100.0 ft), did 21.4 knots on trials and had two 14-inch torpedo tubes in the bows. In 1886 they were renamed 26T-35T.	
1882 - 1883	Centauro	146	38	A series of torpedo boats for Italy. They measured 30.5 metres (100.0 ft), did 21.4 knots on trials and had two 14-inch torpedo tubes in the bows. In 1886 they were renamed 26T-35T.	
1882 - 1883	Dragone	147	38	A series of torpedo boats for Italy. They measured 30.5 metres (100.0 ft), did 21.4 knots on trials and had two 14-inch torpedo tubes in the bows. In 1886 they were renamed 26T-35T.	
1882 - 1883	Pegaso	148	38	A series of torpedo boats for Italy. They measured 30.5 metres (100.0 ft), did 21.4 knots on trials and had two 14-inch torpedo tubes in the bows. In 1886 they were renamed 26T-35T.	
1882 - 1883	Perseo	149	38	A series of torpedo boats for Italy. They measured 30.5 metres (100.0 ft), did 21.4 knots on trials and had two 14-inch torpedo tubes in the bows. In 1886 they were renamed 26T-35T.	
1882 - 1883	Sagittario	150	38	A series of torpedo boats for Italy. They measured 30.5 metres (100.0 ft), did 21.4 knots on trials and had two 14-inch torpedo tubes in the bows. In 1886 they were renamed 26T-35T.	
1882 - 1883	Sirio	151	38	A series of torpedo boats for Italy. They measured 30.5 metres (100.0 ft), did 21.4 knots on trials and had two 14-inch torpedo tubes in the bows. In 1886 they were renamed 26T-35T.	
1882 - 1883	Orione	152	38	A series of torpedo boats for Italy. They measured 30.5 metres (100.0 ft), did 21.4 knots on trials and had two 14-inch torpedo tubes in the bows. In 1886 they were renamed 26T-35T.	
1882	Tb 2. kl. Nr. 4	153	15	Two second class torpedo boats for Denmark. They measured 18.9 metres (62.1 ft) and had two 14-inch torpedo tubes. Compared to the boats of the Royal Navy the intricate steam firing system for the torpedoes had been replaced by compressed air.	
1882	Tb 2. kl. Nr. 5	154	15	Two second class torpedo boats for Denmark. They measured 18.9 metres (62.1 ft) and had two 14-inch torpedo tubes. Compared to the boats of the Royal Navy the intricate steam firing system for the torpedoes had been replaced by compressed air.	
1882	Peace	155		A shallow draught mission steamer for service on the Congo River. It measured 21.3 metres (70.0 ft) and did 10.4 knots on trials. It was important to the yard, being the first vessel built there with watertube boilers. The boilers on the Peace were of the Herreshoff design, but John Thornycroft patented his own design in 1885 and they took over from the previous locomotive boilers.	
1882	Seid	157	45	A torpedo boat for the Swedish Navy. It measured 30.5 metres (100 ft) and was equipped with two 14-inch torpedo tubes in the bows.	
1883	HMTB 98	141	14	A special second class torpedo boat for the Royal Navy, equipped with the Ruthven system of water jet propulsion. The system was a disappointment, making the boat slower (12.6 knots), while raising the noise level of the engines considerably.	
1883	Euterpe	158	13	The first series of second class torpedo boats for Italy. They measured 19.2 metres (63.0 ft), did 17.3 knots on trials and had two 14-inch torpedo tubes in the bows. In 1886 they were renamed 3T-10T.	
1883	Talia	159	13	The first series of second class torpedo boats for Italy. They measured 19.2 metres (63.0 ft), did 17.3 knots on trials and had two 14-inch torpedo tubes in the bows. In 1886 they were renamed 3T-10T.	
1883	Erato	160	13	The first series of second class torpedo boats for Italy. They measured 19.2 metres (63.0 ft), did 17.3 knots on trials and had two 14-inch torpedo tubes in the bows. In 1886 they were renamed 3T-10T.	
1883	Melpomene	161	13	The first series of second class torpedo boats for Italy. They measured 19.2 metres (63.0 ft), did 17.3 knots on trials and had two 14-inch torpedo tubes in the bows. In 1886 they were renamed 3T-10T.	
1883	Terpsicore	162	13	The first series of second class torpedo boats for Italy. They measured 19.2 metres (63.0 ft), did 17.3 knots on trials and had two 14-inch torpedo tubes in the bows. In 1886 they were renamed 3T-10T.	
1883	Polimnia	163	13	The first series of second class torpedo boats for Italy. They measured 19.2 metres (63.0 ft), did 17.3 knots on trials and had two 14-inch torpedo tubes in the bows. In 1886 they were renamed 3T-10T.	
1883	Urania	164	13	The first series of second class torpedo boats for Italy. They measured 19.2 metres (63.0 ft), did 17.3 knots on trials and had two 14-inch torpedo tubes in the bows. In 1886 they were renamed 3T-10T.	
1883	Calliope	165	13	The first series of second class torpedo boats for Italy. They measured 19.2 metres (63.0 ft), did 17.3 knots on trials and had two 14-inch torpedo tubes in the bows. In 1886 they were renamed 3T-10T.	
1883	Sukhum	167	64	This torpedo boat for Russia was the largest yet from Thornycroft. It measured 34.4 metres (113.0 ft), did 19.5 knots on trials and had two torpedo tubes of the large 38 cm (15-inch) type in the bows.	
1883	Defender	168	12	A series of spar torpedo boats for New Zealand. They arrived in 1884 and the following year three sets of dropping gear for torpedoes was acquired for them.	
1883	Taiaroa	169	12	A series of spar torpedo boats for New Zealand. They arrived in 1884 and the following year three sets of dropping gear for torpedoes was acquired for them.	
1883	Waitemata	170	12	A series of spar torpedo boats for New Zealand. They arrived in 1884 and the following year three sets of dropping gear for torpedoes was acquired for them.	
1883	Poneke	171	12	A series of spar torpedo boats for New Zealand. They arrived in 1884 and the following year three sets of dropping gear for torpedoes was acquired for them.	
1883 - 1884	Mosca	173	16	A series of second class torpedo boats for Italy. They were armed with two 14 inch torpedo tubes in the bows and were 20.1 metres (66.0 ft) long. In 1886 they were renamed 12T-15T.	
1883 - 1884	Ape	174	16	A series of second class torpedo boats for Italy. They were armed with two 14 inch torpedo tubes in the bows and were 20.1 metres (66.0 ft) long. In 1886 they were renamed 12T-15T.	
1883 - 1884	Vespa	175	16	A series of second class torpedo boats for Italy. They were armed with two 14 inch torpedo tubes in the bows and were 20.1 metres (66.0 ft) long. In 1886 they were renamed 12T-15T.	
1883 - 1884	Farfalla	176	16	A series of second class torpedo boats for Italy. They were armed with two 14 inch torpedo tubes in the bows and were 20.1 metres (66.0 ft) long. In 1886 they were renamed 12T-15T.	
1883	Lucciola	177	13	A further six units of the Euterpe class for Italy. They were armed with two 14 inch torpedo tubes in the bows and were 19.2 metres (63.0 ft) long. In 1886 they were renamed 16T-21T.	
1883	Formica	178	13	A further six units of the Euterpe class for Italy. They were armed with two 14 inch torpedo tubes in the bows and were 19.2 metres (63.0 ft) long. In 1886 they were renamed 16T-21T.	
1883	Cicala	179	13	A further six units of the Euterpe class for Italy. They were armed with two 14 inch torpedo tubes in the bows and were 19.2 metres (63.0 ft) long. In 1886 they were renamed 16T-21T.	
1883	Locusta	180	13	A further six units of the Euterpe class for Italy. They were armed with two 14 inch torpedo tubes in the bows and were 19.2 metres (63.0 ft) long. In 1886 they were renamed 16T-21T.	
1883	Grillo	181	13	A further six units of the Euterpe class for Italy. They were armed with two 14 inch torpedo tubes in the bows and were 19.2 metres (63.0 ft) long. In 1886 they were renamed 16T-21T.	
1883	Zanzara	182	13	A further six units of the Euterpe class for Italy. They were armed with two 14 inch torpedo tubes in the bows and were 19.2 metres (63.0 ft) long. In 1886 they were renamed 16T-21T.	
1883	Delfinen	183	67	A torpedo boat for the Navy of Denmark. It measured 33.7 metres (110.5 ft), did 20.0 knots on trials and had two torpedo tubes of the large 38 cm (15-inch) type in the bows.	
1883	Alfa	184	4	Three small launches for naval service on the rivers of Brazil. Measuring 13.7 metres (45 ft), they were armed with one spar torpedo, and credited with a speed of 12 knots.	
1883	Beta	185	4	Three small launches for naval service on the rivers of Brazil. Measuring 13.7 metres (45 ft), they were armed with one spar torpedo, and credited with a speed of 12 knots.	
1883	Gama	186	4	Three small launches for naval service on the rivers of Brazil. Measuring 13.7 metres (45 ft), they were armed with one spar torpedo, and credited with a speed of 12 knots.	
1883	"River Gunboat"	187		Two river gunboats for Brazil. The Royal Museums at Greenwich have the plans, but not much else is available online.	
1883	"River Gunboat"	188		Two river gunboats for Brazil. The Royal Museums at Greenwich have the plans, but not much else is available online.	
1884	HMVS Childers	172	65	A torpedo boat for the Colony of Victoria. It measured 34.4 metres (113.0 ft), did 19.1 knots on trials and had two 35 cm (14-inch) torpedo tubes in the bows. It made the trip to Australia under own power.	
1884	HMVS Nepean	189	13	Two second class torpedo boats for the Colony of Victoria. They were identical to the early second class units of the Royal Navy, with dropping gear midships for two 14-inch torpedoes. They measured 18.9 metres (62.1 ft) and did 17.6 knots on trials.	
1884	HMVS Lonsdale	190	13	Two second class torpedo boats for the Colony of Victoria. They were identical to the early second class units of the Royal Navy, with dropping gear midships for two 14-inch torpedoes. They measured 18.9 metres (62.1 ft) and did 17.6 knots on trials.	
1884	TB 191	191	13	A torpedo boat for the Colony of Tasmania. It measured 18.9 metres (62.1 ft) and did 17.2 knots on trials. It was a sister to the boats for New Zealand, and – like them – it originally had spar torpedoes, replaced in 1885 by dropping gear. The name Wasp is used on miramarshipindex.org.nz, but not seen elsewhere.	
1884	Jumbo	192		Steel rowing boat for the Thornycroft yard.	
1884	Th 2	194	13	A second class torpedo boat for the Imperial German Navy. It was of Thornycroft's standard design of the day with two 14-inch torpedoes, measured 19.2 metres (63.0 ft) and did 15.5 knots on trials.	
1884	Hugin	195	60	A first class torpedo boat for the Royal Swedish Navy. It carried two 38 cm (15-inch) torpedo tubes, measured 34.4 metres (113.0 ft) and did 19.2 knots on trials.	
1884	"Steam Launch"	196		Steam launch for Brazil. The Royal Museums at Greenwich have the plans, but not much else is available online.	
1884	Th 1	197	80	A large torpedo boat for the Imperial German Navy. It carried two 14-inch torpedo tubes, measured 35.9 metres (117.8 ft) and did 19.9 knots on trials.	
1884	Hvalrossen	198	74	A first class torpedo boat for the Royal Danish Navy. It carried two 38 cm (15-inch) torpedo tubes, measured 34.7 metres (114.0 ft) and did 18.7 knots on trials.	
1884	Tb 2. kl. Nr. 6	199	15	Two second class torpedo boats for Denmark. They measured 20.1 metres (66.0 ft) and had two 14-inch torpedo tubes. The trial speed was 15.1 knots	
1884	Tb 2. kl. Nr. 7	200	15	Two second class torpedo boats for Denmark. They measured 20.1 metres (66.0 ft) and had two 14-inch torpedo tubes. The trial speed was 15.1 knots	
1884	"Open Launch"	203		Open launch. The Royal Museums at Greenwich have the plans, but not much else is available online.	
1884	Khatadbah	205		River launch. The Royal Museums at Greenwich have the plans, but not much else is available online.	
1885	HMQS Mosquito	193	13	A torpedo boat for the Colony of Queensland. It measured 18.9 metres (62.1 ft) and did 17.2 knots on trials. It was a sister to the boats for New Zealand, but had dropping gear for two 35 cm (14-inch) torpedoes from the outset.	
1885	HMTB 21	201	64	These two torpedo boats for the Royal Navy were based on HMVS Childers and had a similar measurement of 34.6 metres (113.6 ft). The trial speed was 19.8 knots	
1885	HMTB 22	202	64	These two torpedo boats for the Royal Navy were based on HMVS Childers and had a similar measurement of 34.6 metres (113.6 ft). The trial speed was 19.8 knots	
1885	Queen of the Vale	206		Shallow-draught yacht. The Royal Museums at Greenwich have the plans, but not much else is available online.	
1885	Julián Ordóñez	209	66	Two torpedo boats for the Navy of Spain, measurement of 34.6 metres (113.6 ft). The trial speed was 19.8 knots	
1885	Acevedo	210	66	Two torpedo boats for the Navy of Spain, measurement of 34.6 metres (113.6 ft). The trial speed was 19.8 knots	
1885	Albert	213	100	Five Nile river steamers with a measurement of 42.7 metres (140.0 ft) and a trial speed of 15.1 knots. Miramarshipindex.org.nz calls the last unit Leopold.	
1885	Arthur	214	100	Five Nile river steamers with a measurement of 42.7 metres (140.0 ft) and a trial speed of 15.1 knots. Miramarshipindex.org.nz calls the last unit Leopold.	
1885	Alfred	215	100	Five Nile river steamers with a measurement of 42.7 metres (140.0 ft) and a trial speed of 15.1 knots. Miramarshipindex.org.nz calls the last unit Leopold.	
1885	Clarence	216	100	Five Nile river steamers with a measurement of 42.7 metres (140.0 ft) and a trial speed of 15.1 knots. Miramarshipindex.org.nz calls the last unit Leopold.	
1885	Patrick	217	100	Five Nile river steamers with a measurement of 42.7 metres (140.0 ft) and a trial speed of 15.1 knots. Miramarshipindex.org.nz calls the last unit Leopold.	
1886	HMTB 99	207	12	Two second class torpedo boats for the Royal Navy. They measured 19.5 metres (64.0 ft) and had a trial speed of 16.1 knots. No. 100 was the first to have watertube boilers of Thornycrofts own design.	
1886	HMTB 100	208	12	Two second class torpedo boats for the Royal Navy. They measured 19.5 metres (64.0 ft) and had a trial speed of 16.1 knots. No. 100 was the first to have watertube boilers of Thornycrofts own design.	
1886	Sabino Vieira	211	16	Second class torpedo boat for Brazil. Because of a lack of yard number/name coordination this might also be yard no. 196 (or 187–188). One 35 cm (14-inch) torpedo tube in the bows.	
1886	HMTB 25	212	60	First class torpedo boat for the Royal Navy. It had a "bull nose" design of the bows that turned out to be unsatisfactory. It measured 38.9 metres (127.6 ft) and did 19.4 knots on trials.	
1886	HMTB 26	218	60	A series of first class torpedo boats for the Royal Navy. They were based on the HMTB 25 but had a straight bow.	
1886	HMTB 27	219	60	A series of first class torpedo boats for the Royal Navy. They were based on the HMTB 25 but had a straight bow.	
1886	HMTB 28	220	60	A series of first class torpedo boats for the Royal Navy. They were based on the HMTB 25 but had a straight bow.	
1886	HMTB 29	221	60	A series of first class torpedo boats for the Royal Navy. They were based on the HMTB 25 but had a straight bow.	
1886	HMTB 41	222	60	A series of first class torpedo boats for the Royal Navy. They were based on the HMTB 25 but had a straight bow.	
1886	HMTB 42	223	60	A series of first class torpedo boats for the Royal Navy. They were based on the HMTB 25 but had a straight bow.	
1886	HMTB 43	224	60	A series of first class torpedo boats for the Royal Navy. They were based on the HMTB 25 but had a straight bow.	
1886	HMTB 44	225	60	A series of first class torpedo boats for the Royal Navy. They were based on the HMTB 25 but had a straight bow.	
1886	HMTB 45	226	60	A series of first class torpedo boats for the Royal Navy. They were based on the HMTB 25 but had a straight bow.	
1886	HMTB 46	227	60	A series of first class torpedo boats for the Royal Navy. They were based on the HMTB 25 but had a straight bow.	
1886	HMTB 47	228	60	A series of first class torpedo boats for the Royal Navy. They were based on the HMTB 25 but had a straight bow.	
1886	HMTB 48	229	60	A series of first class torpedo boats for the Royal Navy. They were based on the HMTB 25 but had a straight bow.	
1886	HMTB 49	230	60	A series of first class torpedo boats for the Royal Navy. They were based on the HMTB 25 but had a straight bow.	
1886	HMTB 50	231	60	A series of first class torpedo boats for the Royal Navy. They were based on the HMTB 25 but had a straight bow.	
1886	HMTB 51	232	60	A series of first class torpedo boats for the Royal Navy. They were based on the HMTB 25 but had a straight bow.	
1886	HMTB 52	233	60	A series of first class torpedo boats for the Royal Navy. They were based on the HMTB 25 but had a straight bow.	
1886	HMTB 53	234	60	A series of first class torpedo boats for the Royal Navy. They were based on the HMTB 25 but had a straight bow.	
1886	HMTB 54	235	60	A series of first class torpedo boats for the Royal Navy. They were based on the HMTB 25 but had a straight bow.	
1886	HMTB 55	236	60	A series of first class torpedo boats for the Royal Navy. They were based on the HMTB 25 but had a straight bow.	
1886	HMTB 56	237	60	A series of first class torpedo boats for the Royal Navy. They were based on the HMTB 25 but had a straight bow.	
1886	HMTB 57	238	60	A series of first class torpedo boats for the Royal Navy. They were based on the HMTB 25 but had a straight bow.	
1886	HMTB 58	239	60	A series of first class torpedo boats for the Royal Navy. They were based on the HMTB 25 but had a straight bow.	
1886	HMTB 59	240	60	A series of first class torpedo boats for the Royal Navy. They were based on the HMTB 25 but had a straight bow.	
1886	HMTB 60	241	60	A series of first class torpedo boats for the Royal Navy. They were based on the HMTB 25 but had a straight bow.	
1886	Assynt	242		Steam yacht. The Royal Museums at Greenwich have the plans, but not much else is available online.	
1886	Tb 2. kl. Nr. 8	243	15	Two second class torpedo boats for Denmark. They measured 21.2 metres (69.6 ft) and had two 14-inch torpedo tubes. The trial speed was 15.5 knots	
1886	Tb 2. kl. Nr. 9	244	15	Two second class torpedo boats for Denmark. They measured 21.2 metres (69.6 ft) and had two 14-inch torpedo tubes. The trial speed was 15.5 knots	
1886	"Steel sailing boat"	251		Steel sailing (or steel rowing) boats. The Royal Museums at Greenwich have the plans, but not much else is available online.	
1886	"Steel sailing boat"	252		Steel sailing (or steel rowing) boats. The Royal Museums at Greenwich have the plans, but not much else is available online.	
1887	Habana	245	67	Torpedo boat for the Navy of Spain. It measured 38.9 metres (127.6 ft) and had two 14-inch torpedo tubes. The trial speed was 21.3 knots	
1887	Boadicea	246		Banbury described her as a triple screw experimental yacht for John Thornycroft. On the other hand, Thornycroft himself referred to her as a single screw vessel, fitted with a turbine propeller for shallow water navigation. He also stated that she was sold to French owners for service on Madagascar.	
1887	Ariete	247	120	Two first class torpedo boats for Spain. They measured 45.0 metres (147.6 ft) and had two 14-inch torpedo tubes. The trial speed was 26.2 knots and they marked a new increase in the size and speed of the yard's designs.	
1887	Rayo	248	120	Two first class torpedo boats for Spain. They measured 45.0 metres (147.6 ft) and had two 14-inch torpedo tubes. The trial speed was 26.2 knots and they marked a new increase in the size and speed of the yard's designs.	
1887	Støren	249	110	Two first class torpedo boats for the Navy of Denmark. This pair had a traditional ram bow, which made the boats wet at any but the slowest speed. They had two 38 cm (15-inch) torpedo tubes in the bows and two more on the poop. The trial speed was up to 23.3 knots.	
1887	Søløven	250	110	Two first class torpedo boats for the Navy of Denmark. This pair had a traditional ram bow, which made the boats wet at any but the slowest speed. They had two 38 cm (15-inch) torpedo tubes in the bows and two more on the poop. The trial speed was up to 23.3 knots.	
1887	Pollywog	261		Experimental steam launch. The Royal Museums at Greenwich have the plans, but not much else is available online.	
1888	Havhesten	253	110	Two first class torpedo boats for the navy of Denmark. This pair had had a straight stem with the torpedo ports flushed in the bows and that proved to be much better than the Støren boats of the preceding year. They had two 38 cm (15-inch) torpedo tubes in the bows and two more on the poop. The trial speed was up to 22.9 knots.	
1888	Narhvalen	254	110	Two first class torpedo boats for the navy of Denmark. This pair had had a straight stem with the torpedo ports flushed in the bows and that proved to be much better than the Støren boats of the preceding year. They had two 38 cm (15-inch) torpedo tubes in the bows and two more on the poop. The trial speed was up to 22.9 knots.	
1888	Coureur	255	101	Torpedo boat for the Navy of France. It was "virtually a copy" of the Spanish Ariete. It measured 45.0 metres (147.6 ft) and had two 14-inch torpedo tubes. The trial speed was 23.5 knots	
1888	Baluchi	256	96	Three torpedo boats of the 125 foot type, ordered by the Royal Indian Marine. Apparently they never reached India, but were taken over by the Royal Navy in 1892 as HMT B 100, HMT B 102 and HMT B 103. They measured 41.1 metres (134.7 ft) and had five 14-inch torpedo tubes. The trial speed was 21.9 knots.	
1888	Karen	257	96	Three torpedo boats of the 125 foot type, ordered by the Royal Indian Marine. Apparently they never reached India, but were taken over by the Royal Navy in 1892 as HMT B 100, HMT B 102 and HMT B 103. They measured 41.1 metres (134.7 ft) and had five 14-inch torpedo tubes. The trial speed was 21.9 knots.	
1888	Pathan	258	96	Three torpedo boats of the 125 foot type, ordered by the Royal Indian Marine. Apparently they never reached India, but were taken over by the Royal Navy in 1892 as HMT B 100, HMT B 102 and HMT B 103. They measured 41.1 metres (134.7 ft) and had five 14-inch torpedo tubes. The trial speed was 21.9 knots.	
1888	Tb 2. kl Nr. 10	259	16	Two second class torpedo boats for Denmark. They measured 21.4 metres (70.3 ft) and had two 14-inch torpedo tubes. The trial speed was 15.6 knots.	
1888	Tb 2. kl. Nr. 11	260	16	Two second class torpedo boats for Denmark. They measured 21.4 metres (70.3 ft) and had two 14-inch torpedo tubes. The trial speed was 15.6 knots.	
1888	Mirim	262		River tug launch. The Royal Museums at Greenwich have the plans, but not much else is available online.	
1889	Tb 2. kl Nr. 12	263	25	Two second class torpedo boats for Denmark. They measured 24.5 metres (80.4 ft) and had two 14-inch torpedo tubes. The trial speed was 17.9 knots.	
1889	Tb 2. kl. Nr. 13	264	25	Two second class torpedo boats for Denmark. They measured 24.5 metres (80.4 ft) and had two 14-inch torpedo tubes. The trial speed was 17.9 knots.	
1889	Georgie	265		Steam launch for Louis Meyer, Dresden. The Royal Museums at Greenwich have the plans, but not much else is available online.	
1889	Aurora	266		River launch yacht, fitted with a special "turbine propeller" for service on shallow rivers. The Royal Museums at Greenwich have the plans.	
1889	"Steel rowing boat"	269		Galvanised sailing and rowing boats. The Royal Museums at Greenwich have the plans, but not much else is available online.	
1889	"Steel rowing boat"	270		Galvanised sailing and rowing boats. The Royal Museums at Greenwich have the plans, but not much else is available online.	
1890	Boojum	274		Steam launch. The Royal Museums at Greenwich have the plans, but not much else is available online.	
1890	Bijoli	275		River steamer for service in India. Length 42.7 metres (140.0 ft), trial speed 13.9 knots.	
1891	Marcílio Dias	271	110	Three first class torpedo boats for the Navy of Brazil. Length 45.7 metres (150.0 ft), trial speed 25.9 knots. Naval.com.br refer to them as "tipo Coureur", the torpedo boat built for France.	
1891	Iguatemi	272	110	Three first class torpedo boats for the Navy of Brazil. Length 45.7 metres (150.0 ft), trial speed 25.9 knots. Naval.com.br refer to them as "tipo Coureur", the torpedo boat built for France.	
1891	Araguari	273	110	Three first class torpedo boats for the Navy of Brazil. Length 45.7 metres (150.0 ft), trial speed 25.9 knots. Naval.com.br refer to them as "tipo Coureur", the torpedo boat built for France.	
1891	Goodwill	276		River passenger steamer. Built for the Baptist Missionary Society. Length 25.7 metres (84.2 ft), trial speed 9.1 knots. Served on the Upper Congo.	
1892	Comodoro Py	267	110	Two first class torpedo boats for Argentina. Most sources date them to 1890, but histamar.org have them joining the Argentine Navy in 1892. Length 45.7 metres (150.0 ft), trial speed 25.1 knots.	
1892	Comodoro Murature	268	110	Two first class torpedo boats for Argentina. Most sources date them to 1890, but histamar.org have them joining the Argentine Navy in 1892. Length 45.7 metres (150.0 ft), trial speed 25.1 knots.	
1893	RN Pinnace No 256	283		Four pinnaces for the Royal Navy. Length 12.2 metres (40.0 ft), trial speed 9.2 knots.	
1893	RN Pinnace No 257	284		Four pinnaces for the Royal Navy. Length 12.2 metres (40.0 ft), trial speed 9.2 knots.	
1893	RN Pinnace No 258	285		Four pinnaces for the Royal Navy. Length 12.2 metres (40.0 ft), trial speed 9.2 knots.	
1893	RN Pinnace No 259	286		Four pinnaces for the Royal Navy. Length 12.2 metres (40.0 ft), trial speed 9.2 knots.	
1893 - 1894	HMTB 91	289	141	Three first-class torpedo boats for the Royal Navy. No. 93 was different from the others, being the first twin-screw torpedo boat in the Royal Navy. Length 43.5 metres (142.6 ft), trial speed 23.7 knots.	
1893 - 1894	HMTB 92	290	141	Three first-class torpedo boats for the Royal Navy. No. 93 was different from the others, being the first twin-screw torpedo boat in the Royal Navy. Length 43.5 metres (142.6 ft), trial speed 23.7 knots.	
1893 - 1894	HMTB 93	291	141	Three first-class torpedo boats for the Royal Navy. No. 93 was different from the others, being the first twin-screw torpedo boat in the Royal Navy. Length 43.5 metres (142.6 ft), trial speed 23.7 knots.	
1894	HMS Speedy	281	810	A special unit of the Alarm-class torpedo gunboats with water-tube boilers instead of locomotive-types. This made her almost two knots faster than her sisters. At 810 tons she was the yard's largest vessel so far. Length 73.8 metres (242.0 ft), trial speed 20.5 knots.	
1894	Kiran	300	140	River steamer. Length 42.7 metres (140.0 ft), trial speed 13.0 knots.	
1895	HMS Daring	287	264	Thornycroft's part of the Admiralty's 1892 order for 26-knot torpedo boat destroyers. Length 56.4 metres (185.0 ft). Daring did 28.2 knots on trials.	
1895	HMS Decoy	288	264	Thornycroft's part of the Admiralty's 1892 order for 26-knot torpedo boat destroyers. Length 56.4 metres (185.0 ft). Daring did 28.2 knots on trials.	
1895	HMS Ardent	297	269	Thornycroft's part of the Admiralty's 1893-94 order for 27-knot torpedo boat destroyers. Length 61.4 metres (201.6 ft). Boxer did 29.1 knots on trials.	
1895	HMS Boxer	298	269	Thornycroft's part of the Admiralty's 1893-94 order for 27-knot torpedo boat destroyers. Length 61.4 metres (201.6 ft). Boxer did 29.1 knots on trials.	
1895	HMS Bruiser	299	269	Thornycroft's part of the Admiralty's 1893-94 order for 27-knot torpedo boat destroyers. Length 61.4 metres (201.6 ft). Boxer did 29.1 knots on trials.	
1895	President van Heel	304		Lifeboat for the Netherlands. Length 16.8 metres (55.0 ft), trial speed 9.3 knots.	
1897	HMS Desperate	305	372	Thornycroft's part of the Admiralty's 1894-95 order for 30-knot torpedo boat destroyers. Length 64.0 metres (210.0 ft). Desperate did 30.4 knots on trials.	
1897	HMS Fame	306	272	Thornycroft's part of the Admiralty's 1894-95 order for 30-knot torpedo boat destroyers. Length 64.0 metres (210.0 ft). Desperate did 30.4 knots on trials.	
1897	HMS Foam	307	272	Thornycroft's part of the Admiralty's 1894-95 order for 30-knot torpedo boat destroyers. Length 64.0 metres (210.0 ft). Desperate did 30.4 knots on trials.	
1897	HMS Mallard	308	272	Thornycroft's part of the Admiralty's 1894-95 order for 30-knot torpedo boat destroyers. Length 64.0 metres (210.0 ft). Desperate did 30.4 knots on trials.	
1897	Sevillana	323		A fast launch. Length 23.0 metres (75.6 ft), trial speed 21.3 knots.	
1897	RNLB Queen	325		A lifeboat for the Royal National Lifeboat Institution. Length 16.8 metres (55.0 ft), trial speed 8.7 knots.	
1898	HMS Angler	313	270	Thornycroft's part of the Admiralty's 1895-96 order for 30-knot torpedo boat destroyers. Length 64.0 metres (210.0 ft). Ariel did 30.8 knots on trials.	
1898	HMS Ariel	314	270	Thornycroft's part of the Admiralty's 1895-96 order for 30-knot torpedo boat destroyers. Length 64.0 metres (210.0 ft). Ariel did 30.8 knots on trials.	
1898	D 10	322	310	Built for Germany as Divisionsboot 10, this was in fact a variation of the 30-knot RN destroyers, although with lighter guns. Length 64.6 metres (211.9 ft), trial speed 27.7 knots.	
1898	HMS Woodcock	326	150	A class of three river gunboats for the Royal Navy. The first two were dismantled and sent to the China station, while Melik was sent to Egypt and assisted in the campaigns of the Mahdist War. Length 44.2 metres (145.0 ft), trial speed up to 13.3 knots.	
1898	HMS Woodlark	327	150	A class of three river gunboats for the Royal Navy. The first two were dismantled and sent to the China station, while Melik was sent to Egypt and assisted in the campaigns of the Mahdist War. Length 44.2 metres (145.0 ft), trial speed up to 13.3 knots.	
1898	HMS Melik	328	150	A class of three river gunboats for the Royal Navy. The first two were dismantled and sent to the China station, while Melik was sent to Egypt and assisted in the campaigns of the Mahdist War. Length 44.2 metres (145.0 ft), trial speed up to 13.3 knots.	
1899	Shamrock	339	135	A racing yacht built for Sir Thomas Lipton. Length 38.8 metres (127.3 ft).	
1899 - 1900	HMS Coquette	319	270	Thornycroft's part of the Admiralty's 1896-97 order for 30-knot torpedo boat destroyers. Length 64.0 metres (210.0 ft). Ariel did 30.8 knots on trials.	
1899 - 1900	HMS Cygnet	320	270	Thornycroft's part of the Admiralty's 1896-97 order for 30-knot torpedo boat destroyers. Length 64.0 metres (210.0 ft). Ariel did 30.8 knots on trials.	
1899 - 1900	HMS Cynthia	321	270	Thornycroft's part of the Admiralty's 1896-97 order for 30-knot torpedo boat destroyers. Length 64.0 metres (210.0 ft). Ariel did 30.8 knots on trials.	
1900	HMS Albatross	318	380	The Admiralty's 1896-97 orders included three special 33-knotters, of which Thornycroft was assigned one. It never reached that speed, and neither did the others. Length 69.2 metres (227.0 ft), trial speed 31.4 knots.	
1898 - 1900	Murakumo	329	279	The Murakumo-class destroyers for the Imperial Japanese Navy were based Thornycroft's Angler design for the Royal Navy. Length 64.0 metres (210.0 ft). They did up to 30.5 knots on trials.	
1898 - 1900	Shinonome	330	279	The Murakumo-class destroyers for the Imperial Japanese Navy were based Thornycroft's Angler design for the Royal Navy. Length 64.0 metres (210.0 ft). They did up to 30.5 knots on trials.	
1898 - 1900	Yūgiri	331	279	The Murakumo-class destroyers for the Imperial Japanese Navy were based Thornycroft's Angler design for the Royal Navy. Length 64.0 metres (210.0 ft). They did up to 30.5 knots on trials.	
1898 - 1900	Shiranui	332	279	The Murakumo-class destroyers for the Imperial Japanese Navy were based Thornycroft's Angler design for the Royal Navy. Length 64.0 metres (210.0 ft). They did up to 30.5 knots on trials.	
1898 - 1900	Kagerō	337	279	The Murakumo-class destroyers for the Imperial Japanese Navy were based Thornycroft's Angler design for the Royal Navy. Length 64.0 metres (210.0 ft). They did up to 30.5 knots on trials.	
1898 - 1900	Usugumo	338	279	The Murakumo-class destroyers for the Imperial Japanese Navy were based Thornycroft's Angler design for the Royal Navy. Length 64.0 metres (210.0 ft). They did up to 30.5 knots on trials.	
1900	HMS Stag	334	320	Thornycroft's only destroyer in the Admiralty's 1897-98 orders was HMS Stag. Length 64.0 metres (210.0 ft), trial speed 30.5 knots.	
1900	Argus	342	123	The Navy of France had two river gunboats of the Woodcock design, for service in China. Length 44.2 metres (145.0 ft), trial speed up to 13.7 knots.	
1900	Vigilante	343	123	The Navy of France had two river gunboats of the Woodcock design, for service in China. Length 44.2 metres (145.0 ft), trial speed up to 13.7 knots.	
1901	HMTB 98	346	188	The 160-footers were a Thornycroft design for the Royal Navy, based on the 140-footers. Length 48.8 metres (160.0 ft). They did up to 25.8 knots on trials.	
1901	HMTB 99	347	188	The 160-footers were a Thornycroft design for the Royal Navy, based on the 140-footers. Length 48.8 metres (160.0 ft). They did up to 25.8 knots on trials.	
1901	HMTB 107	351	188	The 160-footers were a Thornycroft design for the Royal Navy, based on the 140-footers. Length 48.8 metres (160.0 ft). They did up to 25.8 knots on trials.	
1901	HMTB 108	352	188	The 160-footers were a Thornycroft design for the Royal Navy, based on the 140-footers. Length 48.8 metres (160.0 ft). They did up to 25.8 knots on trials.	
1901	Livingstone	354	111	Stern-wheel river steamer. Length 33.8 metres (111.0 ft), trial speed 9.8 knots.	
1902	Shirakumo	356	342	Two Shirakumo-class destroyers for the Imperial Japanese Navy. Length 66.1 metres (216.9 ft), trial speed up to 31.8 knots.	
1902	Asashio	357	342	Two Shirakumo-class destroyers for the Imperial Japanese Navy. Length 66.1 metres (216.9 ft), trial speed up to 31.8 knots.	
1902 - 1903	HMTB 109	359	200	Five torpedo boats for the Royal Navy. Were slightly larger versions of the 160-foot design. Length 50.6 metres (166.0 ft). They did up to 25.1 knots on trials.	
1902 - 1903	HMTB 110	360	200	Five torpedo boats for the Royal Navy. Were slightly larger versions of the 160-foot design. Length 50.6 metres (166.0 ft). They did up to 25.1 knots on trials.	
1902 - 1903	HMTB 111	361	200	Five torpedo boats for the Royal Navy. Were slightly larger versions of the 160-foot design. Length 50.6 metres (166.0 ft). They did up to 25.1 knots on trials.	
1902 - 1903	HMTB 112	362	200	Five torpedo boats for the Royal Navy. Were slightly larger versions of the 160-foot design. Length 50.6 metres (166.0 ft). They did up to 25.1 knots on trials.	
1902 - 1903	HMTB 113	363	200	Five torpedo boats for the Royal Navy. Were slightly larger versions of the 160-foot design. Length 50.6 metres (166.0 ft). They did up to 25.1 knots on trials.	
1903	Princess of Wales	365		Lifeboat. Length 18.0 metres (59.1 ft), trial speed 9.6 knots.	
1905	HMS Kennet	366	550	These four destroyers were Thornycroft's part of the River-class programme for the Royal Navy. Length 68.6 metres (225.0 ft). They did up to 26.0 knots on trials.	
1905	HMS Jed	367	550	These four destroyers were Thornycroft's part of the River-class programme for the Royal Navy. Length 68.6 metres (225.0 ft). They did up to 26.0 knots on trials.	
1905	HMS Chelmer	371	550	These four destroyers were Thornycroft's part of the River-class programme for the Royal Navy. Length 68.6 metres (225.0 ft). They did up to 26.0 knots on trials.	
1905	HMS Colne	372	550	These four destroyers were Thornycroft's part of the River-class programme for the Royal Navy. Length 68.6 metres (225.0 ft). They did up to 26.0 knots on trials.	
1905	Naparima	373		Shallow-draught steamer for service in the Gulf of Paria, Trinidad. Length 42.7 metres (140.0 ft), trial speed 14.3 knots.	
1905	Magne	378	309	Destroyer for the Royal Swedish Navy. She was a half-sister of the Yarrow-built Mode with dimensions closely resembling Thornycroft's Shirakumo-class destroyers. Length 66.1 metres (216.9 ft), trial speed 30.6 knots.	
1905	Firefly	#397	?	Motor launch, 55 feet (17 m) length, possibly intended as a motor lifeboat for the Newhaven branch of the Royal National Lifeboat Association, and probably built at Chiswick.	
1905	?	#399	?	Tunnel stern launch tug 57 feet (17 m) length, for Henry van During of Shanghai.	
1905	Emil Capitaine	#405	?	Cabin launch, tunnel stern, "gas motor boat" 60 feet (18 m) length, probably built at Chiswick.	
1905	Pollywog or Roona	#408	?	Seagoing motor launch 30 feet (9.1 m) length, built (probably at Chiswick) for Thornycroft stock use - later sold to MacBeth Brothers & Co.	
1905	Dalmuir	#409	?	Cabin launch, tunnel stern, "gas motor boat" 60 feet (18 m) length, probably built at Chiswick for William Beardmore & Co (and a sister to #405).	
1905	Pollywog or Roona	#411	?	Seagoing motor launch 30 feet (9.1 m) length, built (probably at Chiswick) for the Motor Yacht Club.	
1905	Ambrim	#414	?	Open Wooden launch 26 feet (7.9 m) length, built (probably at Chiswick) for A. R. Longridge.	
1906 - 1907	HMTB 6	#415	255	Five early vessels of the Cricket-class of coastal destroyers were built by Thornycroft. The first was launched in 1906 as the Gadfly, but then the Admiralty changed its mind and the proposed names for the others were never used. Instead, they became TB 6-10 from 1906. Length 51.2 metres (168.0 ft). They did up to 27.5 knots on trials.	
1906 - 1907	HMTB 7	#416	255	Five early vessels of the Cricket-class of coastal destroyers were built by Thornycroft. The first was launched in 1906 as the Gadfly, but then the Admiralty changed its mind and the proposed names for the others were never used. Instead, they became TB 6-10 from 1906. Length 51.2 metres (168.0 ft). They did up to 27.5 knots on trials.	
1906 - 1907	HMTB 8	#417	255	Five early vessels of the Cricket-class of coastal destroyers were built by Thornycroft. The first was launched in 1906 as the Gadfly, but then the Admiralty changed its mind and the proposed names for the others were never used. Instead, they became TB 6-10 from 1906. Length 51.2 metres (168.0 ft). They did up to 27.5 knots on trials.	
1906 - 1907	HMTB 9	#418	255	Five early vessels of the Cricket-class of coastal destroyers were built by Thornycroft. The first was launched in 1906 as the Gadfly, but then the Admiralty changed its mind and the proposed names for the others were never used. Instead, they became TB 6-10 from 1906. Length 51.2 metres (168.0 ft). They did up to 27.5 knots on trials.	
1906 - 1907	HMTB 10	#419	255	Five early vessels of the Cricket-class of coastal destroyers were built by Thornycroft. The first was launched in 1906 as the Gadfly, but then the Admiralty changed its mind and the proposed names for the others were never used. Instead, they became TB 6-10 from 1906. Length 51.2 metres (168.0 ft). They did up to 27.5 knots on trials.	
1905	?	#420	?	A paddle-steam (sternwheel) launch 33 feet (10 m) o.a. length, built for Nigeria.	

== See also ==
- List of ships built at John I. Thornycroft & Company, Woolston
