= HMS Ariel (1897) =

Destroyer of the Royal Navy

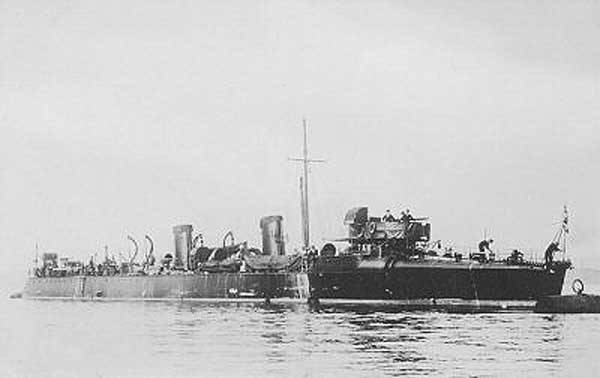
- HMS Ariel

History

United Kingdom
- Name: HMS Ariel
- Ordered: 1895 – 1896 Naval Estimates
- Builder: John I Thornycroft, Chiswick
- Yard number: 314
- Laid down: 23 April 1896
- Launched: 5 March 1897
- Commissioned: October 1898
- Fate: Wrecked, 19 April 1907

General characteristics
- Class & type: Two funnel, 30 knot destroyer
- Displacement: 270 long tons (274 t) standard; 352 long tons (358 t) full load
- Length: 210 ft (64 m) o/a
- Beam: 19 ft 9 in (6.02 m)
- Draught: 7 ft 8 in (2.34 m)
- Installed power: 5,700 shp (4,300 kW)
- Propulsion: 4 × Thornycroft water tube boilers; 2 × vertical triple-expansion steam engines; 2 shafts
- Speed: 30 kn (56 km/h)
- Range: 80 tons coal; 1,310 nmi (2,430 km) at 11 kn (20 km/h)
- Complement: 65 officers and men
- Armament: 1 × QF 12-pounder 12 cwt Mark I L/40 gun on a P Mark I low angle mount; 5 × QF 6-pdr 8 cwt L/40 gun on a Mark I * low angle mount; 2 × single tubes for 18-inch (450 mm) torpedoes

Service record

HMS Ariel was a two funnel, 30 knot destroyer ordered by the Royal Navy under the 1895 – 1896 Naval Estimates. Named after Shakespeare's "airy spirit", or the biblical spirit of the same name, she was the ninth ship of the name to serve in the Royal Navy. She was launched in 1897, served at Chatham and Malta, and was wrecked in a storm in 1907.

== Construction ==
The British Admiralty ordered two "thirty-knotter" torpedo boat destroyers from John I. Thornycroft & Company as part of the 1895–96 shipbuilding programme for the Royal Navy. The two ships, Angler and Ariel were repeats of the four thirty-knotters ordered from Thornycroft under the previous year's programme (Desperate, Fame, Foam and Mallard) and as such shared the same design features.

Thornycroft's design had three water-tube boilers supplying steam at 220 pounds per square inch (1,500 kPa) to 2 four-cylinder triple-expansion steam engines, rated at 5,700 indicated horsepower (4,300 kW), and had two funnels. The ship was 210 feet 0 inches (64.01 m) long overall and 208 feet 0 inches (63.40 m) at the waterline, with a beam of 19 feet 6 inches (5.94 m) and a draught of 5 feet 6 inches (1.68 m). Displacement was 272 long tons (276 t) light and 352 long tons (358 t) full load, while crew was 63 officers and men. The ships were required to reach a speed of 30 knots (56 km/h; 35 mph) during sea trials and carry an armament of a single QF 12 pounder 12 cwt (3 in (76 mm) calibre) gun, backed up by five 6-pounder guns, and two 18-inch (450 mm) torpedo tubes. An arched turtleback (Note: A turtleback is an arched structure over the deck of a ship, normally at the ship's bow, to protect against reach seas.) forecastle was to be fitted.

She was laid down as yard number 314 on 23 April 1896 at Thornycroft's shipyard at Chiswick on the River Thames and was launched on 5 March 1897. During sea trials, she reached 30.82 knots (57.08 km/h; 35.47 mph) over the measured mile and 30.194 knots (55.919 km/h; 34.747 mph) in the three-hour trial. Ariel was completed in October 1898.

== Operational history ==
After commissioning Ariel was assigned to the Chatham Division of the Harwich Flotilla where she participated in the exercises with Angler in 1899. The following year she was part of the Medway Instructional Flotilla. Lieutenant Henry Cyril Royds Brocklebank was appointed in command on 1 March 1900.

She was commissioned at Chatham on 22 August 1901 with a complement of 60 officers and men, to serve at the Mediterranean station. Upon arrival at Gibraltar she replaced Hornet as tender to the receiving ship Cormorant. On 3 December 1901 she arrived in Malta from Gibraltar.

On 5 November 1904 in the context of the aftermath of the Dogger Bank incident she shadowed the Russian fleet leaving Tangier.

== Loss ==
On 19 April 1907, Ariel was wrecked when she ran aground on a breakwater just outside Grand Harbour, Valletta, Malta, at night. All of her crew survived, and were rescued by the destroyer Bruiser.

== Bibliography ==
- Chesneau, Roger & Kolesnik, Eugene M., eds. (1979). Conway's All The World's Fighting Ships 1860–1905. London: Conway Maritime Press. ISBN 0-85177-133-5.
- Colledge, J. J.; Warlow, Ben (2006) [1969]. Ships of the Royal Navy: The Complete Record of All Fighting Ships of the Royal Navy from the 15th Century to the Present (3rd Rev ed.). London: Chatham Publishing. ISBN 978-1-86176-281-8. OCLC 67375475.
- Dittmar, F.J.; Colledge, J. J. (1972). British Warships 1914–1919. Shepperton, UK: Ian Allan. ISBN 0-7110-0380-7.
- Friedman, Norman (2009). British Destroyers: From Earliest Days to the Second World War. Barnsley, UK: Seaforth Publishing. ISBN 978-1-84832-049-9.
- Gardiner, Robert & Gray, Randal, eds. (1985). Conway's All The World's Fighting Ships 1906–1921. London: Conway Maritime Press. ISBN 0-85177-245-5.
- Jane, Fred T. (1969) [1898]. Jane’s All the World's Fighting Ships 1898. New York: first published by Sampson Low Marston, London 1898, Reprinted ARCO Publishing Company.
- Jane, Fred T. (1990) [1919]. Jane’s Fighting Ships of World War I. Jane’s Publishing. ISBN 1 85170 378 0.
- Kemp, Paul (1999). The Admiralty Regrets: British Warship Losses of the 20th Century. Stroud, UK: Sutton Publishing. ISBN 0-7509-1567-6.
- Lyon, David (2001) [1996]. The First Destroyers. London: Caxton Editions. ISBN 1-84067-364-8.
- Manning, T. D. (1961). The British Destroyer. London: Putnam & Co. OCLC 6470051.
- March, Edgar J. (1966). British Destroyers: A History of Development, 1892–1953; Drawn by Admiralty Permission From Official Records & Returns, Ships' Covers & Building Plans. London: Seeley Service. OCLC 164893555.
