= HMS Stag (1899) =

Destroyer of the Royal Navy

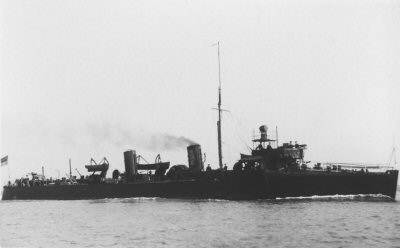
- HMS Stag

History

United Kingdom
- Name: Stag
- Ordered: 1897 – 1897 Naval Estimates
- Builder: Thornycroft, Chiswick
- Yard number: 334
- Laid down: 16 April 1898
- Launched: 18 November 1899
- Commissioned: September 1900
- Fate: Sold for breaking, 17 May 1921

General characteristics
- Class & type: Two funnel, 30 knot destroyer
- Displacement: 286 long tons (291 t) light; 371 long tons (377 t) full load
- Length: 210 ft (64 m) o/a
- Beam: 19 ft 9 in (6.02 m)
- Draught: 7 ft 6 in (2.29 m)
- Installed power: 5,800 shp (4,300 kW)
- Propulsion: 3 × Thornycroft water tube boilers; 2 × vertical triple-expansion steam engines; 2 shafts
- Speed: 30 kn (56 km/h)
- Complement: 63 officers and men
- Armament: 1 × QF 12-pounder 12 cwt Mark Igun; 5 × QF 6-pdr 8 cwt L/40 gun; 2 × single tubes for 18-inch (450 mm) torpedoes

Service record
- Operations: World War I 1914 - 1918

HMS Stag was a two funnel, 30 knot destroyer ordered by the Royal Navy under the 1896 – 1897 Naval Estimates. She was the sixth ship to carry this name. She was launched in 1899 and was first assigned to the Mediterranean. She served in the North Sea and Irish Sea during World War I, and was sold for breaking in 1921.

== Design and construction ==
Stag was ordered by the British Admiralty from Thornycroft on 7 September 1897, one of five "thirty-knotter" torpedo-boat destroyers (Note: Stag from Thornycroft, Orwell from Lairds, Lee from Doxford, Leven from Fairfield and Spiteful from Palmers.) ordered from various shipbuilders as part of the 1897–1898 construction programme. Stag was a slightly modified version of the three "thirty-knotters" ordered from Thornycroft the previous year, (Note: Coquette, Cygnet and Cynthia) with a little more power, increased beam and a revised superstructure.

Thornycroft's design had three water-tube boilers supplying steam at 220 pounds per square inch (1,500 kPa) to 2 four-cylinder triple-expansion steam engines, rated at 5,800 indicated horsepower (4,300 kW), and had two funnels. The ship was 210 ft 0 in (64.01 m) long overall and 208 ft 0 in (63.40 m) at the waterline, with a beam of 19 ft 9 in (6.02 m) and a draught of 7 ft 6 in (2.29 m). Displacement was 286 long tons (291 t) light and 370.6 long tons (376.5 t) full load, while crew was 63 officers and men. Stag was required to reach a speed of 30 knots (56 km/h; 35 mph) during sea trials and carry an armament of a single QF 12 pounder 12 cwt (Note: 12 cwt refers to the weight of the gun in hundredweights) (3 in (76 mm) calibre) gun, backed up by five 6-pounder guns, and two 18-inch (450 mm) torpedo tubes. An arched turtleback (Note: A fore deck with exaggerated camber designed to throw off sea water at high speeds.) forecastle was to be fitted.

Stag was laid down as yard number 334 on 16 April 1898 at Thornycroft's Chiswick shipyard on the River Thames and was launched on 18 November 1899. She was delivered at Chatham Dockyard in early April 1900. During official trials on 19 June 1900, Stag reached a speed of 30.55 kn (35.16 mph; 56.58 km/h) over the measured mile and an average speed of 30.345 kn (34.920 mph; 56.199 km/h) during a 3-hour trial. She was accepted in September 1900.

== Pre-War ==
Lieutenant and Commander B. A. Austen was appointed in command of the Stag on 14 February 1902, and commissioned her at Chatham on 25 February for service with the Instructional Flotilla. Only weeks later, Lieutenant John Maxwell D. E. Warren was appointed in command from 18 March 1902. In May 1902 she transferred her officers and crew to HMS Sturgeon. She was commissioned at Chatham on 2 September 1902 by Commander Sir Douglas Egremont Robert Brownrigg for outbound journey to the Mediterranean, where she was placed in the fleet reserve at Malta. Her crew returned home, while Brownrigg succeeded in command of HMS Coquette, tender to HMS Orion, depot ship for destroyers on the Mediterranean Station.

On the night of 22 November 1910, Stag collided with the destroyer Mallard, with both destroyers suffering damaged stems. The cruisers Aboukir and Bacchante went to the assistance of the two damaged destroyers, which were taken into Syracuse, Sicily for repair. She remained with the Mediterranean Fleet until 1913.

On 30 August 1912 the Admiralty directed all destroyers were to be grouped into classes designated by letters based on contract speed and appearance. As a two-funnelled destroyer with a contract speed of 30 knots, Stag was assigned to the D class. The class letters were painted on the hull below the bridge area and on a funnel.

In February 1913, Stag was still listed as a part of the Mediterranean Fleet, but by April it was reported that she, along with Desperate, Foam and Jed were to be laid up at Malta, to await new crews to be sent from Devonport. Stag left Malta in November 1913 and arrived at Plymouth on 1 December that year. On her return to the UK she joined the 6th Destroyer Flotilla, a patrol flotilla based at Devonport. These patrols, manned with nucleus crews only in peacetime, (Note: Ships with nucleus crews were permanently manned with two-fifths of the ships' normal complement, consisting of key officers and men (including engineering and gunnery specialists), who would become well acquainted with their ships. The ships could be quickly mobilised by regular Navy personnel drawn from shore barracks and training establishments. This mobilisation was frequently practiced.) would have the wartime duty of defence of the East Coast, patrolling to prevent hostile ships from approaching the coast without being detected and attacked, and defence of ports against enemy raids. In January, Stag transferred to the 8th Destroyer Flotilla, another patrol flotilla based at Chatham.

== World War I ==
In July 1914 she remained part of the 8th Destroyer Flotilla based at Chatham tendered to the destroyer depot ship Tyne. On 27 July, as the July Crisis brought war in Europe closer, the 8th Flotilla was ordered to Rosyth for defence of the Firth of Forth, and on 3 August, on the eve of the United Kingdom declaration of war upon Germany and entry to the First World War, was ordered to take up its war stations and therefore proceeded to sea.

On 25 September 1914 while on patrol 7 nmi (8.1 mi; 13 km) south-east of the Isle of May at the mouth of the Firth of Forth Stag reported being missed by two torpedoes fired by an unknown submarine. However, although there had been two attacks by German submarines against warships off the Forth that day, (by U-19 against the torpedo boat TB 33 and by U-22 against Vigilant) German records indicate that no submarine was in position to attack Stag, so Stag's report was apparently mistaken.

Stag was still part of the 8th Flotilla in July 1917, but in August, she had transferred to the 7th Destroyer Flotilla, which was employed on convoy escort duties on the east-coast of England. Stag remained part of the 7th Flotilla until January 1918, but in February was listed as having returned to the 8th Destroyer Flotilla on the Firth of Forth, and by March, had transferred to the Irish Sea Flotilla. She remained based in Ireland with the Irish Sea Hunting Flotilla based at Queenstown (now Cobh) in the South of Ireland until the end of the war.

== Fate ==
In January 1919 she was laid up at the Nore. She was sold on 17 May 1921 to Thos. W. Ward for breaking at Grays, Essex on the Thames Estuary.

== Pennant numbers ==
Pennant number	From	To
P34	Dec 1914	Sep 1915
D43	Sep 1915	Jan 1918
D78	Jan 1918	-

== Bibliography ==
- Dittmar, F. J.; Colledge, J. J. (1972). British Warships 1914–1919. Shepperton, UK: Ian Allan. ISBN 0-7110-0380-7.
- Dunn, Steve R. (2018). Bayly's War: The Battle for the Western Approaches in the First Worlds War. Barnsley, UK: Seaforth Publishing. ISBN 978-1-5267-0123-7.
- Friedman, Norman (2011). Naval Weapons of World War One. Barnsley, UK: Seaforth Publishing. ISBN 978-1-84832-100-7.
- Gardiner, Robert & Gray, Randal, eds. (1985). Conway's All The World's Fighting Ships 1906–1921. London: Conway Maritime Press. ISBN 0-85177-245-5.
- Gardiner, Robert; Lambert, Andrew, eds. (1992). Steam, Steel & Shellfire: The Steam Warship 1815–1905. Conway's History of the Ship. London: Conway Maritime Press. ISBN 0-85177-564-0.
- Lyon, David (2001) [1996]. The First Destroyers. London: Caxton Editions. ISBN 1-84067-364-8.
- Manning, T. D. (1961). The British Destroyer. London: Putnam & Co. OCLC 6470051.
- Massie, Robert K. (2007). Dreadnought: Britain, Germany and the Coming of the Great War. London: Vintage Books. ISBN 978-0-099-52402-1.
- Monograph No. 7: The Patrol Flotillas at the Commencement of the War (PDF). Naval Staff Monographs (Historical). Vol. III. The Naval Staff, Training and Staff Duties Division. 1921. pp. 71–107.
- Monograph No. 24: Home Waters—Part II: September and October 1914 (PDF). Naval Staff Monographs (Historical). Vol. XI. The Naval Staff, Training and Staff Duties Division. 1924.
