= HMS Fame (1896) =

Destroyer of the Royal Navy

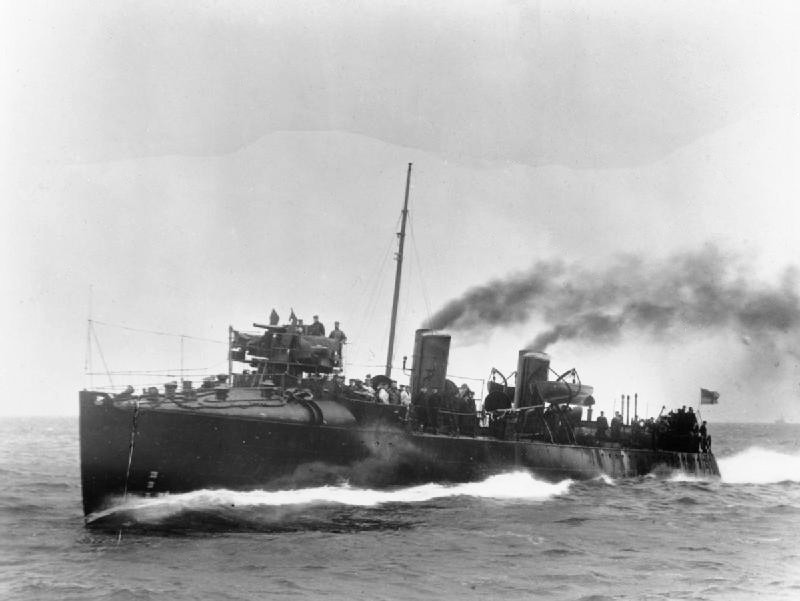
- HMS Fame

History

United Kingdom
- Name: HMS Fame
- Ordered: 10 May 1895
- Builder: John I Thornycroft, Chiswick
- Cost: £54,724
- Yard number: 306
- Laid down: 4 July 1895
- Launched: 15 April 1896
- Commissioned: June 1897
- Out of service: Laid up in reserve 1919
- Identification: Pennant number: D26
- Honours and awards: China 1900
- Fate: Sold for breaking at Hong Kong, 31 August 1921

General characteristics
- Class & type: Two funnel, 30-knot destroyer
- Displacement: 272 long tons (276 t) standard; 352 long tons (358 t) full load
- Length: 210 ft (64 m) o/a
- Beam: 19 ft 6 in (5.94 m)
- Draught: 5 ft 8 in (1.73 m)
- Installed power: 5,700 shp (4,300 kW)
- Propulsion: 3 × water tube boilers; 2 × vertical triple-expansion steam engines; 2 shafts
- Speed: 30 kn (56 km/h)
- Range: 80 tons coal; 1,310 nmi (2,430 km) at 11 kn (20 km/h)
- Complement: 65 officers and men
- Armament: 1 × QF 12-pounder 12 cwt Mark I L/40 naval gun on a P Mark I low angle mount; 5 × QF 6-pdr 8 cwt L/40 gun on a Mark I* low angle mount; 2 × single tubes for 18-inch (450mm) torpedoes

Service record
- Part of: China Station - 1897
- Operations: Boxer Rebellion 1899; First World War 1914–1918

HMS Fame was a two funnel, 30-knot destroyer of the Royal Navy, ordered under the 1894–1895 Naval Estimates. She was launched in 1896, served exclusively in Chinese waters and was sold at Hong Kong in 1921.

== Design and construction ==
HMS Fame was one of three "thirty-knotter" torpedo boat destroyers ordered for the Royal Navy from John I Thornycroft on 10 May 1895 under the 1894–1895 shipbuilding programme. (Note: The other two were Desperate and Foam. A fourth, Mallard was ordered on 30 May that year.) As with other early Royal Navy destroyers, the detailed design was left to the builder, with the Admiralty laying down only broad requirements. These requirements included reaching a speed of 30 knots (56 km/h; 35 mph) during sea trials and an armament of a single QF 12-pounder 12 cwt (3 in (76 mm) calibre) gun, backed up by five 6-pounder guns, and two 18-inch (450 mm) torpedo tubes. An arched turtleback (Note: A turtleback is an arched structure over the deck of a ship, normally at the ship's bow, to protect against reach seas.) forecastle was to be fitted.

Thornycroft's design had three water-tube boilers feeding two four-cylinder triple-expansion steam engines, rated at 5,700 indicated horsepower (4,300 kW), and had two funnels. The ship was 210 feet (64.01 m) long overall and 208 feet (63.40 m) at the waterline, with a beam of 19 feet 6 inches (5.94 m) and a draught of 5 feet 6 inches (1.68 m). Displacement was 272 long tons (276 t) light and 352 long tons (358 t) full load, while crew was 63 officers and men.

Fame was laid down as yard number 306 on 4 July 1895 at Thornycroft's shipyard at Chiswick on the River Thames and was launched on 15 April 1896. During sea trials Fame reached 30.021 knots (55.599 km/h; 34.548 mph) over the measured mile and 30.17 kilometres (18.75 mi) over a three-hour run. She had her armament fitted at Portsmouth, was completed and was accepted by the Royal Navy in June 1897.

== Pre-war ==
On 26 June 1897 she was present at the Royal Naval Review at Spithead in celebration of Queen Victoria's Diamond Jubilee. In the second half of 1897 she was deployed to the China Station and remained there for the rest of her service life.

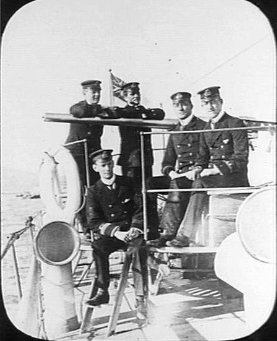
The officers of HMS Fame in 1900, including Roger Keyes

On 17 June 1900, during the Boxer Rebellion in China, she was involved in operations against the Taku forts and Chinese destroyers. The battle of the Taku Forts resulted in the capture of four Chinese destroyers including Hai Lung (later renamed HMS Taku). She was awarded the battle honour "China 1900" for her participation in operations during the Chinese Boxer Rebellion.

Lieutenant Cyril Asser was appointed in command on 1 July 1902. Her boilers were re-tubed in 1902, and she was docked in May 1904. On 19 April 1909, Fame suffered a burst boiler and was towed by Virago to Nagasaki on 20 April.

On 30 August 1912, the Admiralty directed all destroyer classes were to be designated by letters starting with the letter 'A'. As a two funneled destroyer with a contract speed of 30 knots, Fame was assigned to the D class after 30 September 1913. and had the letter 'D' painted on the hull below the bridge area and on either the fore or aft funnel.

== World War I ==
In 1914, she was assigned to the Eastern Fleet in the China Squadron tendered to the battleship HMS Triumph. She remained on China Station for the duration of the First World War.

== Fate ==
In 1919, she was paid off and laid-up in reserve awaiting disposal. She was sold in Hong Kong on 31 August 1921 for breaking.

== Bibliography ==
- Chesneau, Roger & Kolesnik, Eugene M., eds. (1979). Conway's All The World's Fighting Ships 1860–1905. London: Conway Maritime Press. ISBN 0-85177-133-5.
- Colledge, J. J.; Warlow, Ben (2006) [1969]. Ships of the Royal Navy: The Complete Record of All Fighting Ships of the Royal Navy from the 15th Century to the Present (3rd Rev ed.). London: Chatham Publishing. ISBN 978-1-86176-281-8. OCLC 67375475.
- Dittmar, F.J.; Colledge, J. J. (1972). British Warships 1914–1919. Shepperton, UK: Ian Allan. ISBN 0-7110-0380-7.
- Friedman, Norman (2009). British Destroyers: From Earliest Days to the Second World War. Barnsley, UK: Seaforth Publishing. ISBN 978-1-84832-049-9.
- Gardiner, Robert & Gray, Randal, eds. (1985). Conway's All The World's Fighting Ships 1906–1921. London: Conway Maritime Press. ISBN 0-85177-245-5.
- Lyon, David (2001) [1996]. The First Destroyers. London: Caxton Editions. ISBN 1-84067-364-8.
- Manning, T. D. (1961). The British Destroyer. London: Putnam & Co. OCLC 6470051.
- March, Edgar J. (1966). British Destroyers: A History of Development, 1892–1953; Drawn by Admiralty Permission From Official Records & Returns, Ships' Covers & Building Plans. London: Seeley Service. OCLC 164893555.
