= Charles Pipon Beaty-Pownall =

Royal Navy Admiral (1872–1938)

Admiral Charles Pipon Beaty-Pownall, CMG (1 January 1872 – 17 August 1938) was a Royal Navy officer.

== Career ==
Beaty-Pownall joined the Royal Navy, and was confirmed in the rank of sub-lieutenant on 14 August 1891, then promoted to lieutenant. From late 1899 he was successively in short commands of ships in the Medway instructional flotilla, starting with HMS Porcupine in Autumn 1899, then HMS Coquette from late 1899 to February 1900, when he took the crew to HMS Spitfire, changing again after a month when he took command of HMS Desperate in March 1900.

In January 1903 he was posted to the Vernon for torpedo course.

He was Admiral-Superintendent, Chatham dockyard from 1925 to 1927.
