= HMS Hardy (1895) =

Hardy-class destroyer

History

United Kingdom
- Name: HMS Hardy
- Builder: William Doxford & Sons, Sunderland
- Launched: 16 December 1895
- Fate: Sold for scrapping, 11 July 1911

General characteristics
- Class & type: Hardy-class destroyer
- Displacement: 260 long tons (264 t)
- Length: 196 ft (60 m)
- Propulsion: Triple expansion steam engines; Yarrow-type water-tube boilers
- Speed: 27 knots (50 km/h; 31 mph)
- Complement: 53
- Armament: 1 × 12-pounder gun; 5 × 6-pounder guns; 2 × torpedo tubes

HMS Hardy was a Hardy-class destroyer which served with the Royal Navy. She was built by William Doxford & Sons in 1895, launched on 16 December 1895, and sold off on 11 July 1911.

== Construction and design ==
HMS Hardy was one of the two destroyers ordered from William Doxford & Sons on 3 November 1893 as part of the Royal Navy's 1893–1894 construction programme.

The Admiralty did not specify a standard design for destroyers, laying down broad requirements, including a trial speed of 27 knots (31 mph; 50 km/h), a "turtleback" (Note: A fore deck with exaggerated camber designed to throw off sea water at high speeds.) forecastle and armament, which was to vary depending on whether the ship was to be used in the torpedo boat or gunboat role. As a torpedo boat, the planned armament was a single QF 12 pounder 12 cwt (3 in (76 mm) calibre) gun on a platform on the ship's conning tower (in practice the platform was also used as the ship's bridge), together with a secondary gun armament of three 6-pounder guns, and two 18 inch (450 mm) torpedo tubes. As a gunboat, one of the torpedo tubes could be removed to accommodate a further two six-pounders.

Doxford's design had a hull of length 200 feet 3 inches (61.04 m) overall and 196 feet (59.74 m) between perpendiculars, with a beam of 19 feet (5.79 m) and a draught of 7 feet 9 inches (2.36 m). Eight Yarrow boilers fed steam at 185 pounds per square inch (1,280 kPa) to triple expansion steam engines rated at 4,200 indicated horsepower (3,100 kW) and driving two propeller shafts. Displacement was 260 long tons (260 t) light and 325 long tons (330 t) deep load. Unusually for the destroyers ordered under the 1893–1894 programme, the Admiralty accepted a guaranteed speed of 26 knots (48 km/h; 30 mph), rather than the more normal 27 knots, possibly owing to Doxford's inexperience in building torpedo-craft. This speed dropped to 22 knots (41 km/h; 25 mph) at deep load. Sufficient coal was carried to give a range of 1,155 nautical miles (2,139 km; 1,329 mi) at 11 knots (20 km/h; 13 mph). Three funnels were fitted. The ship's complement was 50 officers and men.

She was laid down as Yard Number 226 at Doxford's Sunderland shipyard on 4 June 1894, and was launched on 16 December 1895. Sea trials were successful, with the ship reaching an average speed of 26.8 knots (49.6 km/h; 30.8 mph), and she was completed in August 1896.

== Service history ==
She saw early service in home waters. In 1896 Hardy was in reserve at Chatham. Lieutenant Harry Hesketh Smyth was appointed in command in April 1900, as she was readied for service with the Mediterranean Squadron, from where she was relieved by the destroyer HMS Mallard in late May 1902. She arrived at Plymouth on 5 July 1902, and paid off at Chatham later the same month. Lieutenant Robert Gordon Douglas Dewar was appointed in command during summer 1902, and was briefly succeeded by Lieutenant George Geoffrey Codrington from late 1902 until January 1903, when she took the place of HMS Angler in the Medway instructional flotilla under the command of Lieutenant Frederick Burnaby Noble. She was briefly at Sheerness to repair a defective steam pipe in February 1903.

Hardy was sold for scrap at Devonport for £1400 on 11 July 1911.

== Bibliography ==
- Brassey, T.A. (1902). The Naval Annual 1902. Portsmouth, UK: J. Griffin and Co.
- Chesneau, Roger & Kolesnik, Eugene M., eds. (1979). Conway's All The World's Fighting Ships 1860–1905. London: Conway Maritime Press. ISBN 0-85177-133-5.
- Colledge, J. J.; Warlow, Ben (2006) [1969]. Ships of the Royal Navy: The Complete Record of All Fighting Ships of the Royal Navy from the 15th Century to the Present (3rd Rev ed.). London: Chatham Publishing. ISBN 978-1-86176-281-8. OCLC 67375475.
- Dittmar, F.J.; Colledge, J.J. (1972). British Warships 1914–1919. Shepperton, UK: Ian Allan. ISBN 0-7110-0380-7.
- Friedman, Norman (2009). British Destroyers: From Earliest Days to the Second World War. Barnsley, UK: Seaforth Publishing. ISBN 978-1-84832-049-9.
- Gardiner, Robert & Gray, Randal, eds. (1985). Conway's All The World's Fighting Ships 1906–1921. London: Conway Maritime Press. ISBN 0-85177-245-5.
- Gardiner, Robert; Lambert, Andrew, eds. (1992). Steam, Steel & Shellfire: The Steam Warship 1815–1905. Conway's History of the Ship. London: Conway Maritime Press. ISBN 0-85177-564-0.
- Lyon, David (2001) [1996]. The First Destroyers. London: Caxton Editions. ISBN 1-84067-3648.
- Manning, T. D. (1961). The British Destroyer. London: Putnam & Co. OCLC 6470051.
- March, Edgar J. (1966). British Destroyers: A History of Development, 1892–1953; Drawn by Admiralty Permission From Official Records & Returns, Ships' Covers & Building Plans. London: Seeley Service. OCLC 164893555.
