= HMS Cygnet (1898) =

Destroyer of the Royal Navy

- Cygnet's sister-ship, Cynthia

History

United Kingdom
- Name: Cygnet
- Ordered: 1896 – 1897 Naval Estimates
- Builder: John I Thornycroft, Chiswick
- Yard number: 320
- Laid down: 25 September 1897
- Launched: 3 September 1898
- Commissioned: March 1900
- Fate: Sold for breaking, 29 April 1920

General characteristics
- Class & type: Two funnel, 30 knot destroyer
- Displacement: 367 long tons (373 t) full load
- Length: 210 ft (64 m) o/a
- Beam: 19 ft 6 in (5.94 m)
- Draught: 7 ft 4 in (2.24 m)
- Installed power: 5,700 shp (4,300 kW)
- Propulsion: 4 × Thornycroft water tube boilers; 2 × vertical triple-expansion steam engines; 2 shafts
- Speed: 30 kn (56 km/h)
- Complement: 60 officers and men
- Armament: 1 × QF 12-pounder 12 cwt Mark I L/40 gun on a P Mark I low angle mount; 5 × QF 6-pdr 8 cwt L/40 gun on a Mark I* low angle mount; 2 × single tubes for 18-inch (450 mm) torpedoes

Service record
- Operations: World War I 1914 – 1918

HMS Cygnet was a two funnel, 30 knot destroyer ordered by the Royal Navy under the 1896–1897 Naval Estimates. She was the thirteenth ship to carry this name. She was launched in 1898, served in the Chatham division before World War I and was tendered to the gunnery school at Sheerness during the war. She was sold for breaking in 1920.

== Construction ==
On 21 April 1896, the British Admiralty placed an order with John I Thornycroft and Company for three "thirty-knotter" torpedo-boat destroyers, Coquette, Cygnet and Cynthia, as part of orders for seventeen thirty knotter torpedo boat destroyers and three "specials" required to reach higher speeds.

Cygnet had three water-tube boilers supplying steam at 220 pounds per square inch (1,500 kPa) to 2 four-cylinder triple-expansion steam engines, rated at 5,700 indicated horsepower (4,300 kW), and, like previous Thornycroft destroyers, had two funnels. The ship was 210 ft 0 in (64.01 m) long overall and 208 ft 0 in (63.40 m) at the waterline, with a beam of 19 ft 6 in (5.94 m) and a draught of 7 ft 4 in (2.24 m). Displacement was 367.3 long tons (373.2 t) full load, while crew was 60 officers and men. Cygnet was required to reach a speed of 30 knots (56 km/h; 35 mph) during sea trials and carry an armament of a single QF 12 pounder 12 cwt (Note: 12 cwt refers to the weight of the gun in hundredweights) (3 in (76 mm) calibre) gun, backed up by five 6-pounder guns, and two 18-inch (450 mm) torpedo tubes. An arched turtleback (Note: A fore deck with exaggerated camber designed to throw off sea water at high speeds.) forecastle was to be fitted.

Cygnet was laid down at Thornycroft's Chiswick shipyard as yard number 320 on 25 September 1896, and was launched on 3 September 1898. During official sea trials on 5 May 1899, Cygnet reached a speed of 30.35 kn (34.93 mph; 56.21 km/h) over the measured mile and 30.305 kn (34.874 mph; 56.125 km/h) over a three hour run. Cygnet was completed in February 1900, and was the thirteenth ship of that name to serve with the Royal Navy.

== Pre-War ==
Cygnet commissioned at Chatham in March 1900 and was assigned to the Harwich Flotilla, Commander Cecil Hickley in command. In 1899–1900, she was part of the Medway instructional Flotilla. On 19 April 1900, Cygnet recommissioned at Chatham in preparation for despatch to join the Mediterranean Fleet. In 1900, she cruised to the East Indies with the cruiser Highflyer and the destroyers Conflict, Coquette and Hornet.

Lieutenant Robert G. D. Dewar was appointed in command in early 1902, but was replaced by Lieutenant George J. Todd later that year. In early January 1903 she was on the Mediterranean and took part in a three-weeks cruise with other ships of the station in the Greek islands around Corfu.

On 30 August 1912 the Admiralty directed all destroyers were to be grouped into classes designated by letters based on contract speed and appearance. As a two-funnelled destroyer with a contract speed of 30 knots, Cygnet was assigned to the D class. The class letters were painted on the hull below the bridge area and on a funnel.

In February 1913, Cygnet was listed as being in commission at Sheerness with a nucleus crew. (Note: Ships with nucleus crews were permanently manned with two-fifths of the ships' normal complement, consisting of key officers and men (including engineering and gunnery specialists), who would become well acquainted with their ships. The ships could be quickly mobilised by regular Navy personnel drawn from shore barracks and training establishments. This mobilisation was frequently practiced.)

== World War I ==
In August 1914, found her in active commission at The Nore Local Flotilla based at Sheerness tendered to HMS Actaeon, the torpedo school. She remained in this assignment for the duration of the First World War.

== Decommissioning and disposal ==
In 1919, she was paid off and laid-up in reserve awaiting disposal. Cygnet was sold on 29 April 1920 to Thos. W. Ward of Sheffield for breaking at Rainham, Kent, on the Thames Estuary.

== Pennant numbers ==
Pennant number	Date
N49	1914
D38	September 1915
D22	January 1918

== Bibliography ==
- Brassey, T. A. (1902). The Naval Annual 1902. Portsmouth, UK: J. Griffin and Co.
- Chesneau, Roger; Kolesnik, Eugene M., eds. (1979). Conway's All The World's Fighting Ships 1860–1905. London: Conway Maritime Press. ISBN 0-85177-133-5.
- Colledge, J. J.; Warlow, Ben (2006) [1969]. Ships of the Royal Navy: The Complete Record of All Fighting Ships of the Royal Navy from the 15th Century to the Present (3rd Rev ed.). London: Chatham Publishing. ISBN 978-1-86176-281-8. OCLC 67375475.
- Dittmar, F.J.; Colledge, J. J. (1972). British Warships 1914–1919. Shepperton, UK: Ian Allan. ISBN 0-7110-0380-7.
- Friedman, Norman (2009). British Destroyers: From Earliest Days to the Second World War. Barnsley, UK: Seaforth Publishing. ISBN 978-1-84832-049-9.
- Friedman, Norman (2011). Naval Weapons of World War One. Barnsley, UK: Seaforth Publishing. ISBN 978-1-84832-100-7.
- Gardiner, Robert; Gray, Randal, eds. (1985). Conway's All The World's Fighting Ships 1906–1921. London: Conway Maritime Press. ISBN 0-85177-245-5.
- Gardiner, Robert; Lambert, Andrew, eds. (1992). Steam, Steel & Shellfire: The Steam Warship 1815–1905. Conway's History of the Ship. London: Conway Maritime Press. ISBN 0-85177-564-0.
- Lyon, David (2001) [1996]. The First Destroyers. London: Caxton Editions. ISBN 1-84067-364-8.
- Manning, T. D. (1961). The British Destroyer. London: Putnam & Co. OCLC 6470051.
- Massie, Robert K. (2007). Dreadnought: Britain, Germany and the Coming of the Great War. London: Vintage Books. ISBN 978-0-099-52402-1.
