= D-class destroyer (1913) =

1913 class of British destroyers

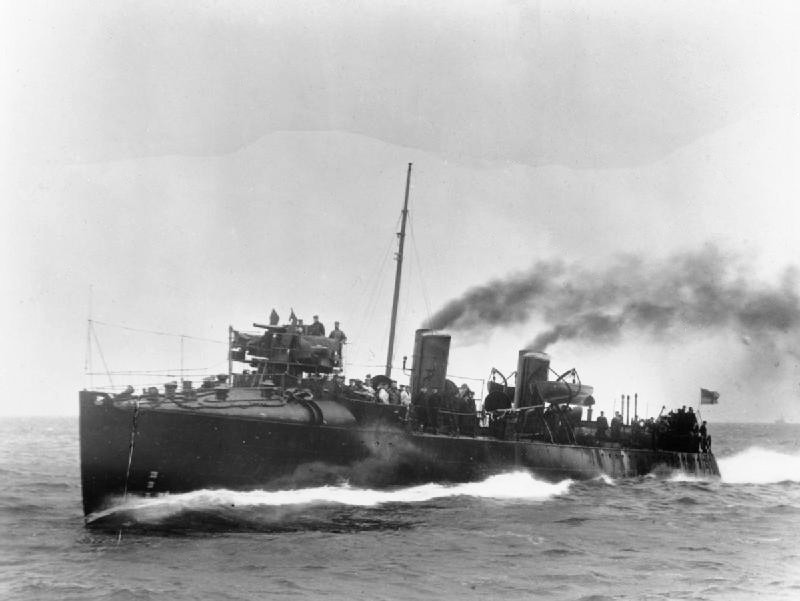
- HMS Fame

Class overview
- Builders: John I. Thornycroft & Company
- Preceded by: A class "27-knotters"
- Succeeded by: River class (E class)
- Built: 1895–1899
- In commission: 1896–1921
- Completed: 10

General characteristics
- Type: Torpedo boat destroyer
- Displacement: 355 to 370 tons at full load
- Length: 210 ft (64 m)
- Beam: 19 ft 9 in (6.02 m)
- Draught: 7 ft 8 in (2.34 m)
- Propulsion: Triple expansion steam engines; Coal-fired water-tube boilers; 5,700 ihp (4,300 kW) (Stag, 5,800 ihp)
- Speed: 30 knots (56 km/h; 35 mph)
- Armament: 1 × QF 12-pounder 12 cwt gun; 5 × QF 6 pounder 8 cwt gun; 2 × 18-inch (450-mm) torpedo tubes

The D class as they were known from 1913 was a fairly homogeneous group of torpedo boat destroyers (TBDs) built for the Royal Navy in the mid-1890s. They were all constructed to the individual designs of their builder, John I. Thornycroft & Company of Chiswick, to meet Admiralty specifications. The uniting feature of the class was a top speed of 30 knots (56 km/h; 35 mph) and they all had two funnels.

== Classification ==
In 1913 the nine surviving "30 knotter" vessels with two funnels (all ten had been built by Thornycroft, but Ariel was lost before their renaming as D class) were retrospectively classified by the Admiralty as the D class to provide some system to the naming of HM destroyers. In the same way those with three funnels were classified as the C-class and those with four funnels as the B-class. All these vessels had a distinctive "turtleback" forecastle that was intended to clear water from the bow, but actually tended to dig the bow in to anything of a sea, resulting in a very wet conning position. They were better constructed than their A-class forebears (the "26 knotter" and "27 knotter" groups), but still were poor seaboats unable to reach top speed in anything but perfect conditions.

== Design ==
They generally displaced 355 to 370 tons and had a length of 210 ft (64 m). All were powered by triple expansion steam engines for 5,700 indicated horsepower (4,300 kW) and had coal-fired water-tube boilers, except for the final vessel (Stag) in which the engine power was slightly raised to 5,800 ihp (4,300 kW). Armament was one QF 12-pounder gun on a bandstand on the forecastle, five QF 6-pounder guns (two sided abreast the conning tower, two sided between the funnels and one on the quarterdeck) and two single tubes for 18-inch (450 mm) torpedoes.

Due to the successful development of their previous 26 and 27-knot torpedo boat destroyers, John I Thornycroft & Company developed their two funnel design for the 1894/1895 – 1897/1898 building programs. The ships were considered an incremental improvement to the previous 27-knot design of the 1893/94 program. This design would be used for all follow-on turtleback ships under the 30-knot specification. The 30-knot torpedo boat destroyers built by Thornycroft were referred to as two funnel – 30-knot ships and were not assigned a class name at the time.

They featured a large fore-bridge, mast halfway between bridge and fore funnel, turtleback cut-away bow, large round stern, both torpedo tubes on centerline aft of second funnel and two funnels. They had a Thornycroft stern with the rudder not visible. They had dual rudders which made them very responsive to the helm.

== Ships ==
All ten of the D class were built by Thornycroft at Chiswick, in four batches.

- First group (ordered 10 May 1895 under 1894–1895 programme);
  - Desperate
  - Fame
  - Foam
  - Mallard - ordered 30 May vice 10 May
- Second group (ordered 23 January 1896 under 1895–1896 programme) - identical with the preceding group;
  - Angler
  - Ariel
- Third group (ordered 21 April 1896 under 1896–1897 programme) - modified from the previous six vessels;
  - Coquette
  - Cygnet
  - Cynthia
- Last group (ordered 7 September 1897 under 1897–1898 programme) - with slightly enhanced engine power;
  - Stag

=== Key dates and fates ===
Name	Yard number	Laid down	Launched	Trials	Completed	Fate
Desperate	305	1 Jul 1895	15 Feb 1896	26 Jun 1896 (a)	Feb 1897	Sold for scrap 20 May 1920, to Thos. W. Ward, Milford Haven
Fame	306	4 Jul 1895	15 Apr 1896	15 Apr 1897	Jun 1897	Sold for scrap 31 August 1921, at Hong Kong.
Foam	307	16 Jul 1895	8 Oct 1896	7 May 1897	Jul 1897	Sold for scrap 26 May 1914, at Chatham
Mallard	308	13 Sep 1895	19 Nov 1896	17 Sep 1897	Oct 1897	Sold for scrap 10 February 1920, to South Alloa Shipbreaking Co.
Angler	313	21 Dec 1896	2 Feb 1897	27 May 1898; 3 Jun 1898	Jul 1898	Sold for scrap 20 May 1920, to Thos. W. Ward, Milford Haven
Ariel	314	23 Apr 1896	5 Mar 1897	7 Aug 1898; 17 Aug 1898	Oct 1898	Wrecked at Malta 19 April 1907
Coquette	319	8 Jun 1896	25 Nov 1897	27 Jul 1899; 20 Dec 1898	Jan 1899	Mined and sunk in the North Sea, 7 March 1916
Cygnet	320	25 Sep 1896	3 Sep 1898	5 May 1899	Feb 1900	Sold for scrap 29 April 1920, to Thos. W. Ward, Rainham
Cynthia	321	16 Jul 1896	8 Jan 1898	26 Oct 1899	Jun 1899	Sold for scrap 29 April 1920, to Thos. W. Ward, Rainham
Stag	334	16 Apr 1898	18 Nov 1899	19 Jun 1900	Sep 1900	Sold for scrap 17 March 1921, to Thos. W. Ward, Grays

Notes: (a) Desperate had a final run over the measured mile on 4 September 1896. Altogether, this vessel completed nine successive preliminary trials.

- A sister-ship built for the Imperial German Navy as flotilla leader for torpedo boats, called Torpedo-Divisionsboot.

Name	Yard number	Laid down	Launched	Completed	Fate
SMS D 10	322	1896	24 Mar 1898	13 Oct 1898	Sold for scrap 28 July 1922, broken in Wilhelmshaven

== See also ==
- B-class destroyer (1913)
- C-class destroyer (1913)

== Bibliography ==
- Chesneau, Roger & Kolesnik, Eugene M., eds. (1979). Conway's All the World's Fighting Ships 1860–1905. London: Conway Maritime Press. ISBN 0-85177-133-5.
- Colledge, J. J.; Warlow, Ben (2006) [1969]. Ships of the Royal Navy: The Complete Record of All Fighting Ships of the Royal Navy from the 15th Century to the Present (3rd Rev ed.). London: Chatham Publishing. ISBN 978-1-86176-281-8. OCLC 67375475.
- Dittmar, F.J.; Colledge, J. J. (1972). British Warships 1914–1919. Shepperton, UK: Ian Allan. ISBN 0-7110-0380-7.
- Friedman, Norman (2009). British Destroyers: From Earliest Days to the Second World War. Barnsley, UK: Seaforth Publishing. ISBN 978-1-84832-049-9.
- Gardiner, Robert & Gray, Randal, eds. (1985). Conway's All the World's Fighting Ships 1906–1921. London: Conway Maritime Press. ISBN 0-85177-245-5.
- Lyon, David (2001) [1996]. The First Destroyers. London: Caxton Editions. ISBN 1-84067-364-8.
- Manning, T. D. (1961). The British Destroyer. London: Putnam & Co. OCLC 6470051.
- March, Edgar J. (1966). British Destroyers: A History of Development, 1892–1953; Drawn by Admiralty Permission From Official Records & Returns, Ships' Covers & Building Plans. London: Seeley Service. OCLC 164893555.
