= HMS Angler =

Destroyer of the Royal Navy

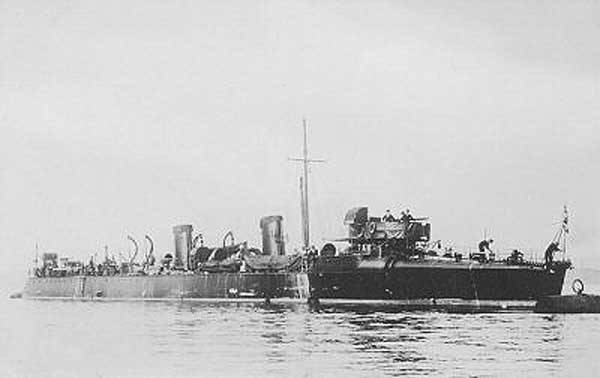
- Angler's sister ship Ariel

History

United Kingdom
- Name: Angler
- Ordered: 1895 – 1896 Naval Estimates
- Builder: John I Thornycroft, Chiswick
- Yard number: 313
- Laid down: 21 December 1895
- Launched: 2 February 1897
- Commissioned: July 1898
- Out of service: Laid up in reserve, 1919
- Fate: Sold for breaking, 20 May 1920

General characteristics
- Class & type: Two funnel, 30 knot destroyer
- Displacement: 270 long tons (274 t) standard; 352 long tons (358 t) full load
- Length: 210 ft (64 m) o/a
- Beam: 19 ft 9 in (6.02 m)
- Draught: 7 ft 8 in (2.34 m)
- Installed power: 5,700 shp (4,300 kW)
- Propulsion: 4 × Thornycroft water tube boilers; 2 × vertical triple-expansion steam engines; 2 shafts
- Speed: 30 kn (56 km/h)
- Range: 80 tons coal; 1,310 nmi (2,430 km) at 11 kn (20 km/h)
- Complement: 65 officers and men
- Armament: 1 × QF 12-pounder 12 cwt Mark I L/40 gun on a P Mark I low angle mount; 5 × QF 6-pdr 8 cwt L/40 gun on a Mark I * low angle mount; 2 × single tubes for 18-inch (450 mm) torpedoes

Service record
- Operations: World War I 1914 - 1918

HMS Angler was a two-funnel, 30-knot destroyer ordered by the Royal Navy under the 1895 – 1896 Naval Estimates. She was the second ship to carry this name. She was launched in 1897, served at Chatham and Portsmouth and was sold for breaking in 1920.

== Construction ==
She was laid down as yard number 313 on 21 December 1896, at the John I Thornycroft and Company shipyard at Chiswick on the River Thames. She was launched on 2 February 1897. During her builder's trials her maximum average speed was 30.4 knots. She proceeded to Portsmouth to have her armament fitted. She was completed and accepted by the Royal Navy in July 1898. During her acceptance trials and work ups her average sea speed was 25 knots.

== Pre-War ==
After commissioning she was assigned to the Chatham Division of the Harwich Flotilla, where she was part of the Medway Instructional Flotilla. She was the flotilla leader under the command of Commander John de Robeck during exercises in 1899. Lieutenant Charles Tibbits was appointed in command in September 1899, serving as such for a year until September 1900. In October 1901 she collided in heavy wind near Felixstowe Pier with the passenger steamer Suffolk, and the stem was damaged. She was quickly repaired, and left Sheerness to rejoin the instructional flotilla in early December. In early August 1902 she was again back in the Medway flotilla, taking the crew of HMS Porcupine under the command of Lieutenant George Geoffrey Codrington. She took part in the fleet review held at Spithead on 16 August 1902 for the coronation of King Edward VII, before Codrington and the crew turned over to HMS Hardy which replaced her in the flotilla in December the same year.

In 1903 she deployed to the Mediterranean Fleet.

On 30 August 1912 the Admiralty directed all destroyer classes were to be designated by alpha characters starting with the letter 'A'. Since her design speed was 30-knots and she had two funnels she was assigned to the D class. After 30 September 1913, she was known as a D-class destroyer and had the letter 'D' painted on the hull below the bridge area and on either the fore or aft funnel.

== World War I ==
August 1914 found her in commission in the Portsmouth Local Flotilla tendered to HMS Excellent, the Portsmouth-based gunnery school. She remained in this deployment for the duration of the First World War.

== Disposition ==
In 1919 she was paid off and laid-up in reserve awaiting disposal. She was sold on 20 May 1920 to Thos. W. Ward of Sheffield for breaking at Milford Haven, Pembrokeshire in Wales.

== Pennant numbers ==
Pennant number	From	To
P25	6 Dec 1914	1 Sep 1915
D38	1 Sep 1915	1 Jan 1918
D04	1 Jan 1918	20 May 1920

== Bibliography ==
- Chesneau, Roger & Kolesnik, Eugene M., eds. (1979). Conway's All The World's Fighting Ships 1860–1905. London: Conway Maritime Press. ISBN 0-85177-133-5.
- Colledge, J. J.; Warlow, Ben (2006) [1969]. Ships of the Royal Navy: The Complete Record of All Fighting Ships of the Royal Navy from the 15th Century to the Present (3rd Rev ed.). London: Chatham Publishing. ISBN 978-1-86176-281-8. OCLC 67375475.
- Dittmar, F.J.; Colledge, J. J. (1972). British Warships 1914–1919. Shepperton, UK: Ian Allan. ISBN 0-7110-0380-7.
- Friedman, Norman (2009). British Destroyers: From Earliest Days to the Second World War. Barnsley, UK: Seaforth Publishing. ISBN 978-1-84832-049-9.
- Gardiner, Robert & Gray, Randal, eds. (1985). Conway's All The World's Fighting Ships 1906–1921. London: Conway Maritime Press. ISBN 0-85177-245-5.
- Jane, Fred T. (1969) [1898]. Jane's All the World's Fighting Ships 1898. New York: first published by Sampson Low Marston, London 1898, Reprinted ARCO Publishing Company.
- Jane, Fred T. (1990) [1919]. Jane's Fighting Ships of World War I. Jane’s Publishing. ISBN 1-85170-378-0.
- Lyon, David (2001) [1996]. The First Destroyers. London: Caxton Editions. ISBN 1-84067-364-8.
- Manning, T. D. (1961). The British Destroyer. London: Putnam & Co. OCLC 6470051.
- March, Edgar J. (1966). British Destroyers: A History of Development, 1892–1953; Drawn by Admiralty Permission From Official Records & Returns, Ships' Covers & Building Plans. London: Seeley Service. OCLC 164893555.
