= HMS Cynthia (1898) =

Destroyer of the Royal Navy

- HMS Cynthia

History

United Kingdom
- Name: HMS Cynthia
- Ordered: 1896 – 1897 Naval Estimates
- Builder: John I. Thornycroft & Company, Chiswick
- Yard number: 321
- Laid down: 25 September 1897
- Launched: 3 September 1898
- Commissioned: 8 March 1900
- Fate: Sold for breaking, 29 April 1920

General characteristics
- Class & type: Two funnel, 30-knot destroyer
- Displacement: 270 long tons (274 t) standard; 352 long tons (358 t) full load
- Length: 210 ft (64 m) o/a
- Beam: 19 ft 9 in (6.02 m)
- Draught: 7 ft 8 in (2.34 m)
- Installed power: 5,700 shp (4,300 kW)
- Propulsion: 4 × Thornycroft water tube boilers; 2 × vertical triple-expansion steam engines; 2 shafts
- Speed: 30 kn (56 km/h)
- Range: 80 tons coal; 1,310 nmi (2,430 km) at 11 kn (20 km/h)
- Complement: 65 officers and men
- Armament: 1 × QF 12-pounder 12 cwt Mark I L/40 gun on a P Mark I low angle mount; 5 × QF 6-pdr 8 cwt L/40 gun on a Mark I * low angle mount; 2 × single tubes for 18-inch (450 mm) torpedoes

Service record
- Operations: World War I 1914 - 1918

HMS Cynthia was a two funnel, 30-knot destroyer ordered by the Royal Navy under the 1896 – 1897 Naval Estimates. She was the third ship to carry this name. She was launched in 1898, served in home waters and the Mediterranean before World War I, and as a tender to the gunnery school at Sheerness during the war. She was sold for breaking in 1920.

== Construction ==
She was laid down as yard number 321 on 16 July 1896 at the John I. Thornycroft & Company shipyard at Chiswick on the River Thames. She was launched on 8 January 1898. During her builder's trials her maximum average speed was 30.2 knots, then proceeded to Portsmouth to have her armament fitted. She was completed and accepted by the Royal Navy in June 1899. During her acceptance trials and work ups her average sea speed was 25 knots.

== Service ==
Cynthia was commissioned at Chatham on 8 March 1900 by Commander Murray MacGregor Lockhart, for service in the Medway Instructional Flotilla. Lieutenant Ernest Sausmarez Carey took the command on 27 December 1900, but was succeeded by Lieutenant James William Guy Innes three months later. In August 1901 she was commissioned to serve with the Mediterranean Fleet, and in May 1902 she completed a refit at Sheerness Dockyard. Lieutenant Rowland Henry Bather was appointed in command, but was reassigned before taking up the position and Lieutenant Alan Cameron Bruce was lent in command of the ship for passage ″out″, when she travelled to Gibraltar in late May 1902. In September 1902 she visited Nauplia with other ships of the fleet, and in early January 1903 she took part in a three-weeks cruise with other ships of her squadron in the Greek islands around Corfu.

On 30 August 1912 the Admiralty directed all destroyer classes were to be designated by letters. she was assigned to the D class along with other destroyers of 30-knots with two funnels. After 30 September 1913, she was known as a D-class destroyer and had the letter ‘D’ painted on the hull below the bridge area and on either the fore or aft funnel.

By August 1914 she was in active commission at The Nore Local Flotilla based at Sheerness tendered to HMS Actaeon, the school of gunnery.) She remained in this deployment for the duration of the First World War.

== Decommissioning and disposal ==
In 1919 she was paid off and laid-up in reserve awaiting disposal. Cynthia was sold on 29 April 1920 to Thos. W. Ward of Sheffield for breaking at Rainham, Kent, on the Thames Estuary.

== Pennant numbers ==
Pennant number	From	To
N09	6 Dec 1914	1 Sep 1915
D39	1 Sep 1915	1 Jan 1918
D23	1 Jan 1918	29 Apr 1920

== Bibliography ==
- Chesneau, Roger & Kolesnik, Eugene M., eds. (1979). Conway's All The World's Fighting Ships 1860–1905. London: Conway Maritime Press. ISBN 0-85177-133-5.
- Colledge, J. J.; Warlow, Ben (2006) [1969]. Ships of the Royal Navy: The Complete Record of All Fighting Ships of the Royal Navy from the 15th Century to the Present (3rd Rev ed.). London: Chatham Publishing. ISBN 978-1-86176-281-8. OCLC 67375475.
- Dittmar, F.J.; Colledge, J. J. (1972). British Warships 1914–1919. Shepperton, UK: Ian Allan. ISBN 0-7110-0380-7.
- Friedman, Norman (2009). British Destroyers: From Earliest Days to the Second World War. Barnsley, UK: Seaforth Publishing. ISBN 978-1-84832-049-9.
- Gardiner, Robert & Gray, Randal, eds. (1985). Conway's All The World's Fighting Ships 1906–1921. London: Conway Maritime Press. ISBN 0-85177-245-5.
- Jane, Fred T. (1969) [1898]. Jane's All the World's Fighting Ships 1898. New York: first published by Sampson Low Marston, London 1898, Reprinted ARCO Publishing Company.
- Jane, Fred T. (1990) [1919]. Jane's Fighting Ships of World War I. Jane’s Publishing. ISBN 1-85170-378-0.
- Lyon, David (2001) [1996]. The First Destroyers. London: Caxton Editions. ISBN 1-84067-364-8.
- Manning, T. D. (1961). The British Destroyer. London: Putnam & Co. OCLC 6470051.
- March, Edgar J. (1966). British Destroyers: A History of Development, 1892–1953; Drawn by Admiralty Permission From Official Records & Returns, Ships' Covers & Building Plans. London: Seeley Service. OCLC 164893555.
