= HMS Coquette (1897) =

Destroyer of the Royal Navy

- Coquette's sister-ship, Cynthia

History

United Kingdom
- Name: Coquette
- Ordered: 1896 – 1897 Naval Estimates
- Builder: John I Thornycroft, Chiswick
- Yard number: 319
- Laid down: 8 June 1896
- Launched: 25 November 1897
- Commissioned: January 1899
- Fate: Mined, 7 March 1916

General characteristics
- Class & type: Two-funnel, 30-knot destroyer
- Displacement: 270 long tons (274 t) standard; 352 long tons (358 t) full load
- Length: 210 ft (64 m) o/a
- Beam: 19 ft 9 in (6.02 m)
- Draught: 7 ft 8 in (2.34 m)
- Installed power: 5,700 shp (4,300 kW)
- Propulsion: 4 × Thornycroft water tube boilers; 2 × vertical triple-expansion steam engines; 2 shafts
- Speed: 30 kn (56 km/h)
- Range: 80 tons coal; 1,310 nmi (2,430 km) at 11 kn (20 km/h)
- Complement: 65 officers and men
- Armament: 1 × QF 12-pounder 12 cwt Mark I L/40 gun on a P Mark I low angle mount; 5 × QF 6-pdr 8 cwt L/40 gun on a Mark I* low angle mount; 2 × single tubes for 18-inch (450 mm) torpedoes

Service record
- Operations: World War I 1914 – 1918

HMS Coquette was a two funnel, 30-knot destroyer ordered by the Royal Navy under the 1896 – 1897 Naval Estimates. She was the fifth ship to carry this name. She was launched in 1897, served in home waters before World War I, and as a tender to the gunnery school at Sheerness during the war. She was sold for breaking in 1920.

== Construction ==
She was laid down as yard number 319 on 8 June 1896 at the John I Thornycroft and Company shipyard at Chiswick on the River Thames. She was launched on 25 November 1897. During her builder's trials her maximum average speed was 30.3 knots (56.1 km/h), then proceeded to Portsmouth to have her armament fitted. She was completed and accepted by the Royal Navy in January 1899. During her acceptance trials and work ups her average sea speed was 25 knots.

== Service history ==
=== Early service ===
After commissioning she was assigned to the Chatham Division of the Harwich Flotilla, and from 1899 she was part of the Medway Instructional Flotilla under the command of Lieutenant Charles Pipon Beaty-Pownall. She was replaced in the flotilla on 26 February 1900 by HMS Spitfire, to which Lieutenant Beaty-Pownell and the crew also transferred. Commander Thomas Murray Parks was appointed in command in April 1900, serving over the summer that year on the China station.

Commander Michael Culme-Seymour was appointed in command on 31 August 1900. In May 1902 she served in the Mediterranean, and was involved in a collision with the destroyer Thrasher, when she had her bows stove in. After repairs, she was tender to HMS Orion, the Mediterranean Fleet destroyer depot ship. Commander Sir Douglas Egremont Robert Brownrigg was appointed in command after he arrived at Malta in late September 1902.

On 30 August 1912 the Admiralty directed all destroyer classes were to be designated by alpha characters starting with the letter 'A'. Since her design speed was 30 knots and she had two funnels she was assigned to the D class. After 30 September 1913, she was known as a D-class destroyer and had the letter "D" painted on the hull below the bridge area and on either the fore or aft funnel.

=== World War I ===
August 1914 found her in active commission at The Nore Local Flotilla based at Sheerness tendered to HMS Actaeon, the torpedo school. She remained in this deployment for the duration of the First World War until her loss.

=== Loss ===
She was lost on 7 March 1916 at the entrance to Black Deep off the East Coast near Harwich after striking a mine laid by the German submarine UC-10. She sank in the North Sea at an approximate position of 51°45′N 01°30′E (about 10 nautical miles (19 km) East of Clacton-on-Sea) with the loss of 22 crewmembers.

== Pennant numbers ==
Pennant number	From	To
N21	6 Dec 1914	1 Sep 1915
D37	1 Sep 1915	7 Mar 1916

== Bibliography ==
- Chesneau, Roger & Kolesnik, Eugene M., eds. (1979). Conway's All The World's Fighting Ships 1860–1905. London: Conway Maritime Press. ISBN 0-85177-133-5.
- Colledge, J. J.; Warlow, Ben (2006) [1969]. Ships of the Royal Navy: The Complete Record of All Fighting Ships of the Royal Navy from the 15th Century to the Present (3rd Rev ed.). London: Chatham Publishing. ISBN 978-1-86176-281-8. OCLC 67375475.
- Dittmar, F.J.; Colledge, J. J. (1972). British Warships 1914–1919. Shepperton, UK: Ian Allan. ISBN 0-7110-0380-7.
- Friedman, Norman (2009). British Destroyers: From Earliest Days to the Second World War. Barnsley, UK: Seaforth Publishing. ISBN 978-1-84832-049-9.
- Gardiner, Robert & Gray, Randal, eds. (1985). Conway's All The World's Fighting Ships 1906–1921. London: Conway Maritime Press. ISBN 0-85177-245-5.
- Jane, Fred T. (1969) [1898]. Jane's All the World's Fighting Ships 1898. New York: first published by Sampson Low Marston, London 1898, Reprinted ARCO Publishing Company.
- Jane, Fred T. (1990) [1919]. Jane's Fighting Ships of World War I. Jane’s Publishing. ISBN 1-85170-378-0.
- Lyon, David (2001) [1996]. The First Destroyers. London: Caxton Editions. ISBN 1-84067-364-8.
- Manning, T. D. (1961). The British Destroyer. London: Putnam & Co. OCLC 6470051.
- March, Edgar J. (1966). British Destroyers: A History of Development, 1892–1953; Drawn by Admiralty Permission From Official Records & Returns, Ships' Covers & Building Plans. London: Seeley Service. OCLC 164893555.
