= HMS Mallard (1896) =

Destroyer of the Royal Navy

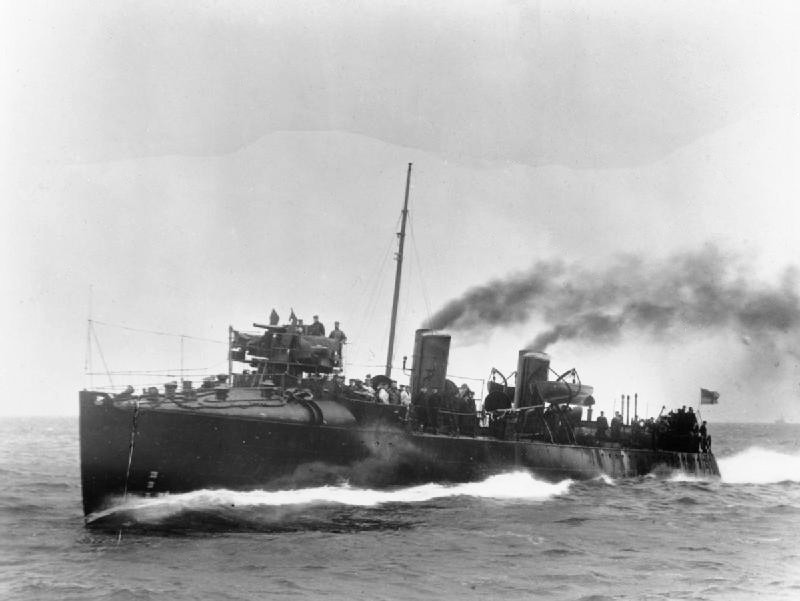
- Fame, sister-ship to Mallard

History

United Kingdom
- Name: HMS Mallard
- Ordered: 30 May 1895
- Builder: John I Thornycroft, Chiswick
- Cost: £54,715
- Yard number: 308
- Laid down: 13 September 1895
- Launched: 19 November 1896
- Commissioned: October 1897
- Out of service: Laid up in reserve 1919
- Fate: Sold for breaking, 10 February 1920

General characteristics
- Class & type: Two funnel, 30 knot destroyer
- Displacement: 272 long tons (276 t) standard; 352 long tons (358 t) full load
- Length: 210 ft (64 m) o/a
- Beam: 19 ft 6 in (5.94 m)
- Draught: 5 ft 8 in (1.73 m)
- Installed power: 5,700 shp (4,300 kW)
- Propulsion: 3 × water tube boilers; 2 × vertical triple-expansion steam engines; 2 shafts
- Speed: 30 kn (56 km/h)
- Range: 80 tons coal; 1,310 nmi (2,430 km) at 11 kn (20 km/h)
- Complement: 65 officers and men
- Armament: 1 × QF 12-pounder 12 cwt Mark I L/40 naval gun on a P Mark I low angle mount; 5 × QF 6-pdr 8 cwt L/40 gun on a Mark I* low angle mount; 2 × single tubes for 18-inch (450mm) torpedoes

Service record
- Operations: World War I 1914 - 1918

HMS Mallard was a two funnel, 30-knot destroyer ordered by the Royal Navy under the 1894 – 1895 Naval Estimates. She served in Home waters both before and during the First World War, and was sold for breaking in 1920.

== Construction ==
She was laid down as yard number 308 on 15 September 1895 at the John I. Thornycroft & Company shipyard at Chiswick on the River Thames. She was launched on 19 November 1896. During her builder's trials her maximum average speed was 30.1 knots. She had her armament fitted at Portsmouth, was completed and was accepted by the Royal Navy in October 1897.

== Pre-War ==
After commissioning she was assigned to the Chatham Division of the Harwich Flotilla.

Lieutenant Guy de Lancy Ormsby Johnson was appointed in command on 11 January 1900, when she served as part of the Medway instructional flotilla. In April 1900 she was present at an accident at Brighton's West Pier, when seven sailors from HMS Desperate were drowned in bad weather as they approached the pier.

Lieutenant Charles Tuthill Borrett was appointed in command on 20 January 1901, and she served in Home waters and was until October 1901 attached to the Medway instructional flotilla. In early April 1902 Lieutenant George J. Todd was appointed in command, shortly before she finished a refit where she also had her hull strengthened. She was commissioned for service in the Mediterranean Fleet, and left Portsmouth for Gibraltar in late May 1902, arriving at Malta in July. She was reported to visit Greek waters (including Nauplia) in September 1902.

On the night of 22 November 1910, Mallard collided with the destroyer Stag, with both destroyers suffering damaged stems. The cruisers Aboukir and Bacchante went to the assistance of the two damaged destroyers, which were taken into Syracuse, Sicily for repair. On 30 August 1912 the Admiralty directed that all destroyer classes were to be designated by letters. Since her design speed was 30-knots and she had two funnels she was assigned to the D class; the three and four-funnel 30-knotters becoming the C and B classes. After 30 September 1913, she was known as a D-class destroyer and had the letter ‘D’ painted on the hull below the bridge area and on either the fore or aft funnel

== First World War ==
In July 1914 she was in active commission assigned to the 8th Destroyer Flotilla based at Sheerness tendered to the destroyer depot ship Tyne. In August 1914 the 8th was redeployed to the River Tyne and employed on anti-submarine and counter-mining patrols.

In November 1917 she deployed to the Irish Sea Hunting Flotilla until the cessation of hostilities providing anti-submarine and counter-smuggling patrols.

== Fate ==
In 1919 she was paid off and laid-up in reserve awaiting disposal. Mallard was sold on 10 February 1920 to Alloa Ship Breaking Company for breaking at Charlestown.

== Pennant numbers ==
| Pennant number | From | To |
|---|---|---|
| D26 | 6 Dec 1914 | 1 Sep 1915 |
| D41 | 1 Sep 1915 | 1 Jan 1918 |
| D55 | 1 Jan 1918 | 10 Feb 1920 |

== Bibliography ==
- Chesneau, Roger & Kolesnik, Eugene M., eds. (1979). Conway's All The World's Fighting Ships 1860–1905. London: Conway Maritime Press. ISBN 0-85177-133-5.
- Colledge, J. J.; Warlow, Ben (2006) [1969]. Ships of the Royal Navy: The Complete Record of All Fighting Ships of the Royal Navy from the 15th Century to the Present (3rd Rev ed.). London: Chatham Publishing. ISBN 978-1-86176-281-8. OCLC 67375475.
- Dittmar, F.J.; Colledge, J. J. (1972). British Warships 1914–1919. Shepperton, UK: Ian Allan. ISBN 0-7110-0380-7.
- Friedman, Norman (2009). British Destroyers: From Earliest Days to the Second World War. Barnsley, UK: Seaforth Publishing. ISBN 978-1-84832-049-9.
- Gardiner, Robert & Gray, Randal, eds. (1985). Conway's All The World's Fighting Ships 1906–1921. London: Conway Maritime Press. ISBN 0-85177-245-5.
- Lyon, David (2001) [1996]. The First Destroyers. London: Caxton Editions. ISBN 1-84067-364-8.
- Manning, T. D. (1961). The British Destroyer. London: Putnam & Co. OCLC 6470051.
- March, Edgar J. (1966). British Destroyers: A History of Development, 1892–1953; Drawn by Admiralty Permission From Official Records & Returns, Ships' Covers & Building Plans. London: Seeley Service. OCLC 164893555.
