= HMS Foam (1896) =

Destroyer of the Royal Navy

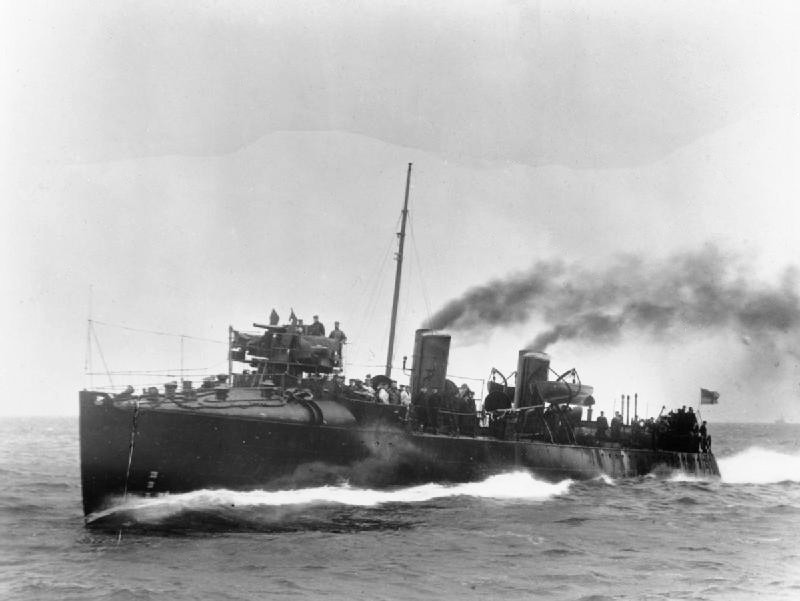
- Fame, sister-ship of Foam

History

United Kingdom
- Name: Foam
- Ordered: 10 May 1895
- Builder: John I Thornycroft, Chiswick
- Cost: £54,432
- Yard number: 307
- Laid down: 16 July 1895
- Launched: 8 October 1896
- Commissioned: July 1897
- Fate: Sold for breaking, 26 May 1914

General characteristics
- Class & type: Two funnel, 30 knot destroyer
- Displacement: 272 long tons (276 t) standard; 352 long tons (358 t) full load
- Length: 210 ft (64 m) o/a
- Beam: 19 ft 6 in (5.94 m)
- Draught: 5 ft 8 in (1.73 m)
- Installed power: 5,700 shp (4,300 kW)
- Propulsion: 3 × water tube boilers; 2 × vertical triple-expansion steam engines; 2 shafts
- Speed: 30 kn (56 km/h)
- Range: 80 tons coal; 1,310 nmi (2,430 km) at 11 kn (20 km/h)
- Complement: 65 officers and men
- Armament: 1 × QF 12-pounder 12 cwt Mark I L/40 naval gun on a P Mark I low angle mount; 5 × QF 6-pdr 8 cwt L/40 gun on a Mark I* low angle mount; 2 × single tubes for 18-inch (450mm) torpedoes

HMS Foam was a two funnel, 30 knot destroyer ordered by the Royal Navy under the 1894–1895 Naval Estimates. She served in the Mediterranean for most of her short career and was sold in 1914, 4 months before the beginning of World War I.

== Construction ==
Ordered on 10 May 1895, she was laid down as yard number 307 on 16 July 1895 at the John I Thornycroft and Company shipyard at Chiswick on the River Thames. She was launched on 8 October 1896. During her builder's trials she made her contract speed of 30 knots (56 km/h), then proceeded to Portsmouth to have her armament fitted. She was completed and accepted by the Royal Navy in July 1897. During her acceptance trials and work ups her average sea speed was 25 knots.

== Pre-War ==
On 26 June 1897 she was present at the Royal Naval Review at Spithead in celebration of Queen Victoria's Diamond Jubilee. Rudyard Kipling visited her in May 1897, and what he learnt on board was put to good use in his poem "The Destroyers". Foam was deployed to the Mediterranean Fleet in the second half of 1897 and remained there for most of her career. Lieutenant Stanley Venn Ellis was appointed in command on 24 March 1902. In September 1902 she visited Nauplia with other ships of the fleet. She returned to Home waters in 1913.

On 30 August 1912 the Admiralty directed all destroyer classes were to be designated by letters, starting with the letter 'A'. Since her design speed was 30-knots and she had two funnels she was assigned to the D class. After 30 September 1913, she was known as a D-class destroyer and had the letter ‘D’ painted on the hull below the bridge area and on either the fore or aft funnel.

== Fate ==
As part of the progressive modernization of the Royal Navy, Foam was sold on 26 May 1914 at Chatham and scrapped in Norway.

== Bibliography ==
- Chesneau, Roger & Kolesnik, Eugene M., eds. (1979). Conway's All The World's Fighting Ships 1860–1905. London: Conway Maritime Press. ISBN 0-85177-133-5.
- Colledge, J. J.; Warlow, Ben (2006) [1969]. Ships of the Royal Navy: The Complete Record of All Fighting Ships of the Royal Navy from the 15th Century to the Present (3rd Rev ed.). London: Chatham Publishing. ISBN 978-1-86176-281-8. OCLC 67375475.
- Dittmar, F.J.; Colledge, J. J. (1972). British Warships 1914–1919. Shepperton, UK: Ian Allan. ISBN 0-7110-0380-7.
- Friedman, Norman (2009). British Destroyers: From Earliest Days to the Second World War. Barnsley, UK: Seaforth Publishing. ISBN 978-1-84832-049-9.
- Gardiner, Robert & Gray, Randal, eds. (1985). Conway's All The World's Fighting Ships 1906–1921. London: Conway Maritime Press. ISBN 0-85177-245-5.
- Jane, Fred T. (1969) [1898]. Jane's All the World's Fighting Ships 1898. New York: first published by Sampson Low Marston, London 1898, Reprinted ARCO Publishing Company.
- Lyon, David (2001) [1996]. The First Destroyers. London: Caxton Editions. ISBN 1-84067-364-8.
- Manning, T. D. (1961). The British Destroyer. London: Putnam & Co. OCLC 6470051.
- March, Edgar J. (1966). British Destroyers: A History of Development, 1892–1953; Drawn by Admiralty Permission From Official Records & Returns, Ships' Covers & Building Plans. London: Seeley Service. OCLC 164893555.
