= HMS Desperate (1896) =

Destroyer of the Royal Navy

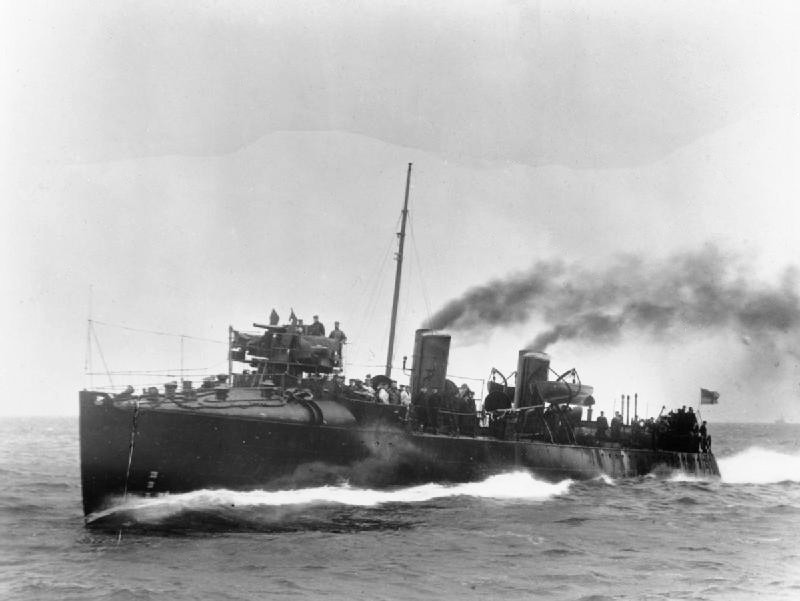
- Fame, sister-ship to Desperate

History

United Kingdom
- Name: HMS Desperate
- Ordered: 10 May 1895
- Builder: John I Thornycroft, Chiswick
- Cost: £54,579
- Yard number: 305
- Laid down: 1 July 1895
- Launched: 15 February 1896
- Commissioned: February 1897
- Out of service: Laid up in reserve 1919
- Fate: Sold for breaking, 20 May 1920

General characteristics
- Class & type: Two funnel, 30 knot destroyer
- Displacement: 272 long tons (276 t) standard; 352 long tons (358 t) full load
- Length: 210 ft (64 m) o/a
- Beam: 19 ft 6 in (5.94 m)
- Draught: 5 ft 8 in (1.73 m)
- Installed power: 5,700 shp (4,300 kW)
- Propulsion: 3 × water tube boilers; 2 × vertical triple-expansion steam engines; 2 shafts
- Speed: 30 kn (56 km/h)
- Range: 80 tons coal; 1,310 nmi (2,430 km) at 11 kn (20 km/h)
- Complement: 65 officers and men
- Armament: 1 × QF 12-pounder 12 cwt Mark I L/40 naval gun on a P Mark I low angle mount; 5 × QF 6-pdr 8 cwt L/40 gun on a Mark I* low angle mount; 2 × single tubes for 18-inch (450mm) torpedoes

Service record
- Operations: World War I 1914 - 1918

HMS Desperate was a two funnel, 30-knot destroyer ordered by the Royal Navy under the 1894 – 1895 Naval Estimates. She was launched in 1896, served in Home waters and the Mediterranean before World War I. She was based in Portsmouth during the war and was sold for breaking in 1920.

== Construction ==
She was laid down as yard number 305 on 1 July 1895 at the John I. Thornycroft & Company shipyard at Chiswick on the River Thames. She was launched on 15 February 1896. During her builder's trials her maximum average speed was 30.3 knots. She had her armament fitted in Portsmouth. She was completed and accepted by the Royal Navy in February 1897. During her acceptance trials and work ups her average sea speed was 25 knots.

She received a set of spare boilers produced by Messrs. Thorneycroft & Co. in late 1902.

== Service ==
After commissioning she was assigned to the Chatham Division of the Harwich Flotilla. On 26 June 1897 she was present at the Royal Naval Review at Spithead in celebration of Queen Victoria's Diamond Jubilee. She was reassigned to Sheerness in January 1900 for instructional purposes at the Sheerness school of gunnery, including as tender to HMS Wildfire. Two months later, she was transferred to Chatham to relieve the destroyer Spitfire in the Medway Fleet Reserve.

She was involved in an accident at West Pier, Brighton on 10th April 1900. The ship's boat carrying twelve seaman was swamped resulting in seven sailors drowning. Late in 1900 she was deployed to the British Mediterranean Fleet based at Malta. Lieutenant Edward Oliver Gladstone was appointed in command in September 1901. In September 1902 she visited the Aegean Sea with other ships of the station for combined manoeuvres near Nauplia.

She remained in the Mediterranean until November 1913, when she was ordered to return to home waters. On her return to home waters she was assigned to the Portsmouth Local Defence Flotilla.

On 30 August 1912 the Admiralty directed that all destroyer classes were to be designated by letters. She was assigned to the D class along with other destroyers built to the same overall specification. After 30 September 1913, she was known as a D-class destroyer and had the letter ‘D’ painted on the hull below the bridge area and on either the fore or aft funnel.

For the test mobilization in July 1914 she was assigned to the Portsmouth Local Flotilla. In August 1914 she was in active commission tendered to HMS Excellent, the Portsmouth gunnery school. She remained there for the duration of the First World War.

== Fate ==
In 1919 Desperate was paid off then laid up in reserve awaiting disposal. She was sold on 20 May 1920 to Thos. W. Ward of Sheffield for breaking at Milford Haven, Wales.

== Pennant numbers ==
Pennant number	From	To
P50	6 December 1914	1 September 1915
D40	1 September 1915	1 January 1918
D26	1 January 1918	13 September 1918

== Bibliography ==
- Chesneau, Roger & Kolesnik, Eugene M., eds. (1979). Conway's All The World's Fighting Ships 1860–1905. London: Conway Maritime Press. ISBN 0-85177-133-5.
- Colledge, J. J.; Warlow, Ben (2006) [1969]. Ships of the Royal Navy: The Complete Record of All Fighting Ships of the Royal Navy from the 15th Century to the Present (3rd Rev ed.). London: Chatham Publishing. ISBN 978-1-86176-281-8. OCLC 67375475.
- Dittmar, F.J.; Colledge, J. J. (1972). British Warships 1914–1919. Shepperton, UK: Ian Allan. ISBN 0-7110-0380-7.
- Friedman, Norman (2009). British Destroyers: From Earliest Days to the Second World War. Barnsley, UK: Seaforth Publishing. ISBN 978-1-84832-049-9.
- Gardiner, Robert & Gray, Randal, eds. (1985). Conway's All The World's Fighting Ships 1906–1921. London: Conway Maritime Press. ISBN 0-85177-245-5.
- Lyon, David (2001) [1996]. The First Destroyers. London: Caxton Editions. ISBN 1-84067-364-8.
- Manning, T. D. (1961). The British Destroyer. London: Putnam & Co. OCLC 6470051.
- March, Edgar J. (1966). British Destroyers: A History of Development, 1892–1953; Drawn by Admiralty Permission From Official Records & Returns, Ships' Covers & Building Plans. London: Seeley Service. OCLC 164893555.
