= A-class destroyer (1913) =

Class of British destroyers

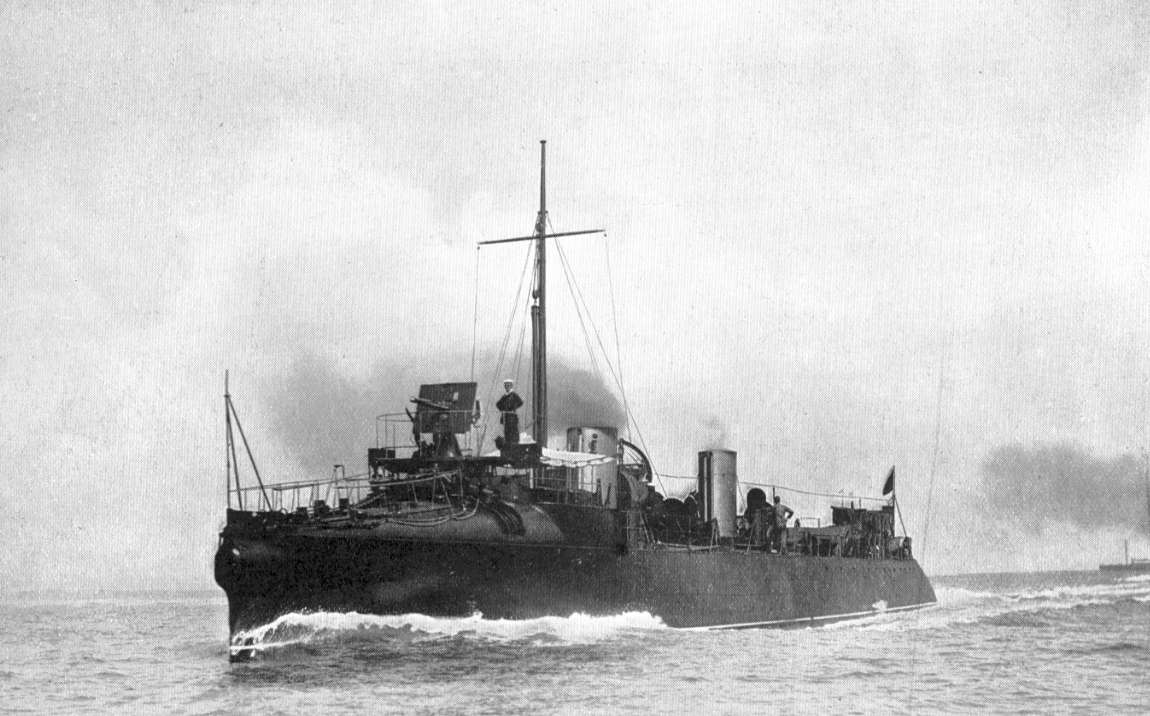
- HMS Daring, the lead ship of the "26-knotter" group

Class overview
- Builders: Various
- Operators: Royal Navy
- Preceded by: none
- Succeeded by: B class; C class; D class
- Built: 1892–1895
- In commission: 1893–1920
- Completed: 42
- Lost: 3

General characteristics
- Type: Destroyer
- Displacement: From 185–340 long tons (188–345 t)
- Length: 200–210 ft (61–64 m)
- Propulsion: Triple expansion steam engines; Coal-fired water-tube boilers
- Speed: 26 kn (48 km/h) or 27 kn (50 km/h)
- Complement: 46 to 53
- Armament: 1 × QF 12-pounder gun; Up to 5 × QF 6 pounder guns; 2 × 18 inch (450 mm) torpedo tubes; The six 1892–93 Programme ships had a third torpedo tube in the bow, later removed

The A class as designated in 1913 was a heterogeneous group of torpedo boat destroyers (TBDs) built for the Royal Navy in the mid-1890s. Some 42 vessels were constructed to the individual designs of their builders to meet Admiralty specifications, the only uniting feature being a specified top speed of 27 knots (50 km/h). In fact the initial six vessels were generally differentiated by a slightly lower speed and were often referred to as "26-knotters" to distinguish them from the following batch of thirty-six vessels; all fifteen surviving "27-knotter" vessels were classified by the Admiralty as the A class in 1913 to provide some system to the naming of HM destroyers. All of the "26-knotters" and most of the "27-knotters" had been lost or scrapped before the 1913 classification (and so – strictly speaking – never survived to become 'A' class), but for convenience all 42 ships are listed below. The number of funnels varied from one to four. All vessels had a distinctive "turtleback" forecastle that was intended to clear water from the bow, but actually tended to dig the bow in to anything of a sea, resulting in a very wet conning position.

They generally displaced around 260 tons and had a length of around 200 feet (61 m). All were powered by triple expansion steam engines and had coal-fired water-tube boilers (although initially, some had "locomotive type" fire-tube boilers in lieu). Armament was generally one QF 12 pounder on a bandstand on the forecastle, up to five QF 6 pounder and 2 single tubes for 18-inch (457 mm) torpedoes. The six 1892–93 Programme ships initially had a third tube in the bow, fixed to fire straight ahead, but this was found to weigh down the bows and it was possible for the ship to run over its own torpedo when moving at high speed, so these were later removed and this feature was not repeated in later vessels.

== Ships ==
=== The 26-knotter group ===
Six ships were ordered under the 1892–93 programme:

- Daring-class destroyer; both built by John I. Thornycroft & Company, Chiswick.
  - Daring, launched 25 November 1893, sold for breaking up 10 April 1912.
  - Decoy, launched 7 February 1894, sunk in collision with Arun 13 August 1904.
- Havock-class destroyer; both built by Yarrow Shipbuilders, Poplar.
  - Havock, launched 12 August 1893, sold for breaking up 14 May 1912.
  - Hornet, launched 3 December 1893, sold for breaking up 12 October 1909.
- Ferret-class destroyer; both built by Laird Brothers, Birkenhead.
  - Ferret, launched 9 December 1893, dismantled 1910 and sunk as target 1911.
  - Lynx, launched 24 January 1894, sold for breaking up 10 April 1912.

=== The 27-knotter group ===
Initially six torpedo boat destroyers (the Thornycroft and Yarrow vessels below) were ordered under the 1893–94 Programme, but a series of follow-up orders raised the programme to thirty-six vessels. The initial Estimates contained a sum of about £651,000 for payments on fourteen vessels, but the postponement of the First Class cruiser programme for that year allowed twenty-five destroyers to be ordered in that year, with the balance of eleven vessels funded under the 1894–95 Estimates (but still under the 1893–94 Programme).

- Ardent-class destroyer; all built by John I. Thornycroft & Company, Chiswick.
  - Ardent, launched 16 October 1894, sold for breaking up 10 October 1911.
  - Boxer, launched 28 November 1894, lost in collision with SS St Patrick in the Channel 8 February 1918.
  - Bruizer, launched 27 February 1895, sold for breaking up 26 May 1914.
- Charger-class destroyer; all built by Yarrow Shipbuilders Ltd, Poplar.
  - Charger, launched 15 September 1894, sold for breaking up 14 May 1912.
  - Dasher, launched 28 November 1894, sold for breaking up 14 May 1912.
  - Hasty, launched 16 June 1894, sold for breaking up 9 July 1912.
- Banshee-class destroyer; all built by Laird Brothers, Birkenhead
  - Banshee, launched 17 November 1894, sold for breaking up 10 April 1912.
  - Contest, launched 1 December 1894, sold for breaking up 11 July 1911.
  - Dragon, launched 15 December 1894, sold for breaking up 9 July 1912.
- Conflict-class destroyer; all built by J. Samuel White, Cowes
  - Conflict, launched 13 December 1894, sold for breaking up 20 May 1920.
  - Teazer, launched 9 February 1895, sold for breaking up 9 July 1912.
  - Wizard, launched 27 February 1895, sold for breaking up 20 May 1920.
- Fervent-class destroyer; both built by Hanna, Donald & Wilson, Paisley.
  - Fervent, launched 20 March 1895, sold for breaking up 20 May 1920.
  - Zephyr, launched 10 May 1895, sold for breaking up 20 May 1920.
- Handy-class destroyer; all built by Fairfields, Govan
  - Handy, launched 9 March 1895, sold for breaking up 1916 at Hong Kong.
  - Hart, launched 27 March 1895, sold for breaking up 1912 at Hong Kong.
  - Hunter, launched 28 December 1895, sold for breaking up 10 April 1912.
- Hardy-class destroyer; both built by William Doxford & Sons, Sunderland.
  - Hardy, launched 16 December 1895, sold for breaking up 11 July 1911.
  - Haughty, launched 18 September 1895, sold for breaking up 10 April 1912.
- Janus-class destroyer; all built by Palmers, Jarrow.
  - Janus, launched 12 March 1895, sold for breaking up 1914 at Hong Kong.
  - Lightning, launched 10 April 1895, sunk, probably by mine, 30 June 1915.
  - Porcupine, launched 19 September 1895, sold for breaking up 29 April 1920.
- Sunfish-class destroyer; all built by Hawthorn, Newcastle upon Tyne.
  - Sunfish, launched 9 August 1895, sold for breaking up 7 June 1920.
  - Opossum, launched 4 October 1895, sold for breaking up 29 July 1920.
  - Ranger, launched 28 May 1895, sold for breaking up 20 July 1920.
- Rocket-class destroyer; all built by J & G Thomson (later to become John Brown and Company), Clydebank.
  - Rocket, launched 14 August 1894, sold for breaking up 10 April 1912.
  - Shark, launched 22 September 1894, sold for breaking up 11 July 1911.
  - Surly, launched 10 November 1894, sold for breaking up 23 March 1920.
- Salmon-class destroyer; both built by Earle's, Kingston upon Hull.
  - Salmon, launched 15 January 1895, sold for breaking up 14 May 1912.
  - Snapper, launched 30 January 1895, sold for breaking up 14 May 1912.
- Sturgeon-class destroyer; all built by Naval Construction and Armament Company (later to become Vickers and eventually Vickers-Armstrongs), Barrow in Furness.
  - Sturgeon, launched 21 July 1894, sold for breaking up 14 May 1912.
  - Starfish, launched 26 January 1895, sold for breaking up 15 May 1912.
  - Skate, launched 13 March 1895, sold for breaking up 9 April 1907.
- Swordfish-class destroyer; both built by Armstrong Mitchell and Company (later part of Vickers-Armstrongs), Elswick, Newcastle upon Tyne
  - Swordfish, launched 7 June 1895, sold for breaking up 11 October 1910.
  - Spitfire, launched 27 February 1895, sold for breaking up 10 April 1912.
- Zebra class; built by Thames Iron Works, Bow Creek
  - Zebra, launched 13 December 1895, sold for breaking up 30 July 1914.

== Bibliography ==
- Chesneau, Roger & Kolesnik, Eugene M., eds. (1979). Conway's All The World's Fighting Ships 1860–1905. London: Conway Maritime Press. ISBN 0-85177-133-5.
- Colledge, J. J.; Warlow, Ben (2006) [1969]. Ships of the Royal Navy: The Complete Record of All Fighting Ships of the Royal Navy from the 15th Century to the Present (3rd Rev ed.). London: Chatham Publishing. ISBN 978-1-86176-281-8. OCLC 67375475.
- Dittmar, F.J.; Colledge, J.J. (1972). British Warships 1914–1919. Shepperton, UK: Ian Allan. ISBN 0-7110-0380-7.
- Friedman, Norman (2009). British Destroyers: From Earliest Days to the Second World War. Barnsley, UK: Seaforth Publishing. ISBN 978-1-84832-049-9.
- Gardiner, Robert & Gray, Randal, eds. (1985). Conway's All The World's Fighting Ships 1906–1921. London: Conway Maritime Press. ISBN 0-85177-245-5.
- Lyon, David (2001) [1996]. The First Destroyers. London: Caxton Editions. ISBN 1-84067-3648.
- Manning, T. D. (1961). The British Destroyer. London: Putnam & Co. OCLC 6470051.
- March, Edgar J. (1966). British Destroyers: A History of Development, 1892–1953; Drawn by Admiralty Permission From Official Records & Returns, Ships' Covers & Building Plans. London: Seeley Service. OCLC 164893555.
