= Dasher =

Dasher may refer to any of the following:

- A delivery driver for the third-party delivery service known as DoorDash
- Dasher (software), a computer accessibility tool
- Dasher (Santa Claus's reindeer), one of Santa Claus's reindeer as named in "The Night Before Christmas"
- Dasher, Georgia, a town in the United States
- Volkswagen Dasher or Passat, an automobile model
- HMS Dasher (1895), a Charger-class torpedo-boat destroyer launched in 1895 and sold in 1912
- HMS Dasher (D37), an Avenger-class escort carrier launched in 1941 and sunk in 1943
- HMS Dasher (P280), an Archer-class patrol boat launched in 1986 and currently in service
- Danville Dashers, a former ice hockey team from Danville, Illinois, in the Continental Hockey League
- Danville Dashers, an ice hockey team from Danville, Illinois, in the Federal Hockey League
- Dasher High School, a historic institution of secondary education in Valdosta, Georgia
- Frank Abbandando or The Dasher, a New York contract killer
- Dasher Troy, American baseball player
- Kevin Wheatley or Dasher, Australian recipient of the Victoria Cross
- Dasher, the plunger part of a butter churn

== People with the surname ==
- Erica Dasher, American actress

== See also ==
- Blue dasher (Pachydiplax longipennis), a dragonfly indigenous to North America
- HMS Dasher, a list of ships named HMS Dasher
