= Sunfish =

Sunfish or sun-fish may refer to:

== Fish ==
- Centrarchidae, or sunfishes, a family of freshwater fish
  - Lepomis, the genus of true sunfish
- Molidae, the family of ocean sunfishes
  - Mola (fish), or sunfish
    - Ocean sunfish, Mola mola
- Basking shark, Cetorhinus maximus, common names include sun-fish
- Opah, a family of saltwater fish family Lampridae commonly known as sunfish

== Arts and entertainment ==
- The Sunfish, 2014 Danish film Klumpfisken
- Sunfish (musical), 2013

== Places ==
- Sunfish, Kentucky, U.S.
- Sunfish Pond, in Worthington State Forest, New Jersey, U.S.
- Sunfish Township, Pike County, Ohio, U.S.

== Ships ==
- Sunfish (sailboat), a sailing dinghy
- HMS Sunfish, the name of several ships of the Royal Navy
- USS Sunfish, the name of several ships of the US Navy
