= HMS Ranger =

Fifteen ships of the Royal Navy have borne the name HMS Ranger

- HMS Ranger (1747) was a 24-gun sixth rate, previously the French privateer Deux Couronnes. She was captured in 1747 by HMS Gloucester (1745).
- HMS Ranger (1752) was an 8-gun sloop launched in 1752 and sold in 1783.
- HMS Ranger (1779) was a cutter purchased in 1779. The Admiralty renamed her HMS Pigmy in 1781 and had her converted into a sloop. It sold her in 1784.
- HMS Ranger (1787) was the 14-gun revenue cutter Rose, launched in 1776, that the Royal Navy purchased in 1787, and that the French captured in 1794. The British recaptured her (twice) in 1797 and renamed her HMS Venturer. She was sold in 1803.
- HMS Ranger (1794) was a 16-gun sloop launched in 1794. The French captured and burned her in 1805.
- HMS Ranger (1806) was a 16-gun cutter launched in 1806 and purchased by the Navy. She was renamed HMS Pigmy later in 1806 and grounded and was captured in 1807.
- HMS Ranger (1807) was an 18-gun sloop launched in 1807 and broken up in 1814.
- HMS Ranger (1820) was a 28-gun sixth rate launched in 1820 and sold in 1832.
- HMS Ranger (1835) was an 8-gun packet brig launched in 1835, hulked in 1860 and sold in 1867.
- HMS Ranger (1859) was a Philomel-class wood screw gunboat, launched in 1859 and sold in 1869.
- HMS Ranger (1880) was an Algerine-class composite screw gunvessel launched in 1880. She was sold to the Liverpool Salvage Association as a salvage vessel in 1892, doing contract salvage work for the Admiralty in both World Wars, as well as having an extensive civilian career.
- HMS Ranger (1895) was a Sunfish-class destroyer launched in 1895 and sold in 1920.
- HMS Ranger was to have been a C-class destroyer. She was renamed HMS Caesar in 1942 before being launched in 1944.
- HMS Ranger is an Archer-class patrol vessel, launched in 1986, completed in 1988, and currently in service.

== His Majesty's hired armed vessels ==
A series of hired armed vessels were hired by the Royal Navy;

- A sloop named Ranger was temporarily hired in 1718 to take part in the successful hunt for the notorious pirate Blackbeard, but does not appear to have ever formally been a part of the Navy.
- In July 1809 the Royal Navy hired ten open boats, all between 14 and 16 tons (bm), for less than a month to serve as pilot boats for the unfortunate Walcheren Campaign. One of these boats was named Ranger.
- Lastly, in January 1810, the RN hired the ship Ranger, of 16 guns, for several weeks. This may have been the Ranger, of 326 tons (bm), Deanham, master.

== British Revenue vessel ==
- HMS Ranger was a revenue cutter operating off Great Yarmouth. In April 1821, under the command of Captain Sayer, she seized about 400 tubs of Geneva from a smuggling vessel, but was lost in a gale in October 1822 off Happisburgh, with no attempt being made by locals to rescue the crew.

== In fiction ==
- A fictitious Polaris Resolution-class submarine captured in the James Bond film The Spy Who Loved Me was also named HMS Ranger.
