= HMS Salmon =

Three vessels of the Royal Navy have been named HMS Salmon after the fish:

- HMS Salmon (1895), launched in 1895, was a Salmon-class destroyer that was sold in 1911.
- HMS Salmon (1916), launched 7 October 1916, was an R-class destroyer which fought in World War I, was renamed Sable in 1933 and scrapped in 1937.
- HMS Salmon (N65), launched 30 April 1934, was an S-class submarine which fought in World War II and was lost, probably sunk by a mine, on 9 July 1940.
