= HMS Handy (1895) =

Handy-class destroyer

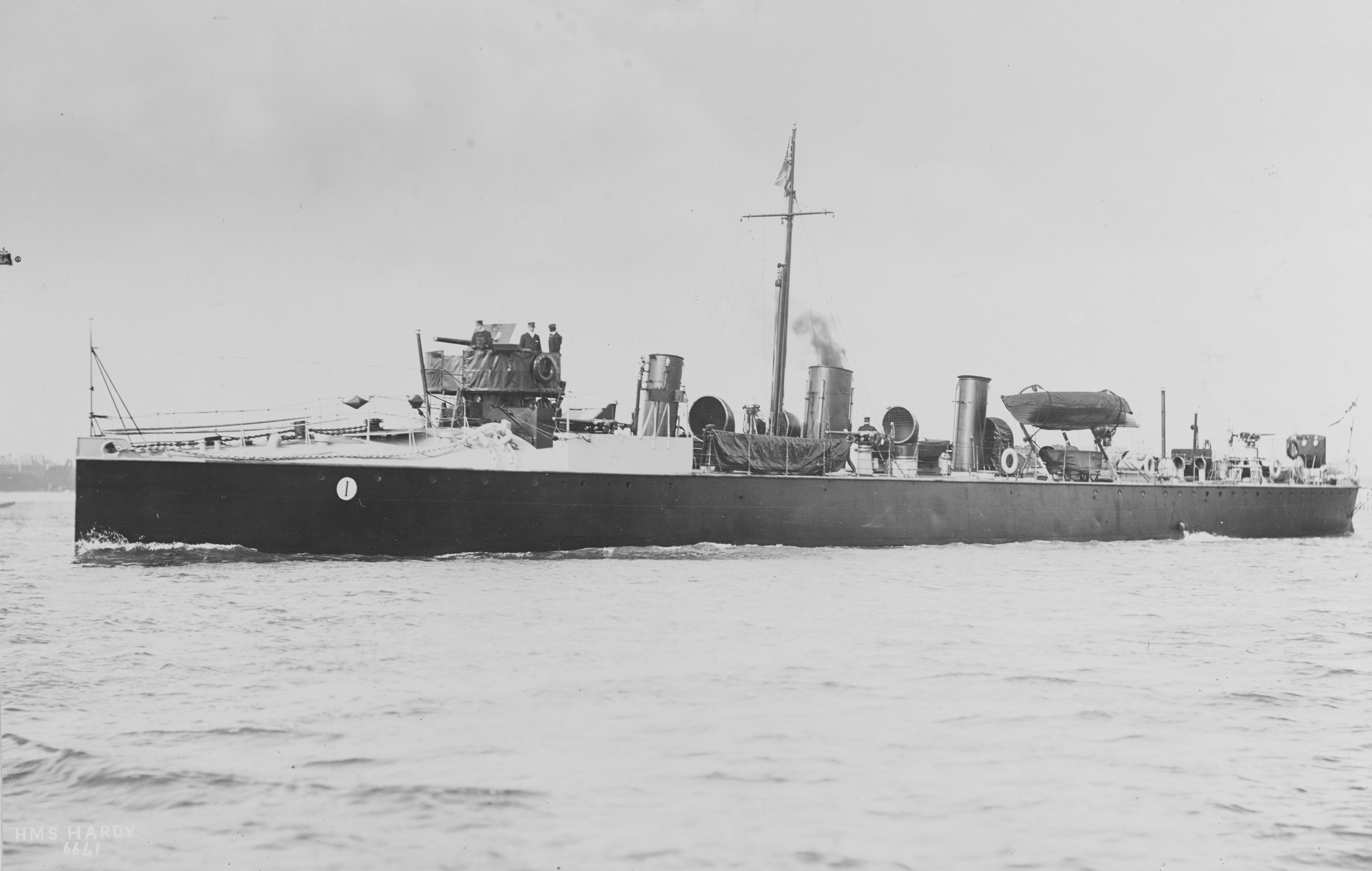

History

United Kingdom
- Name: HMS Handy
- Builder: Fairfields, Govan
- Laid down: 7 June 1894
- Launched: 9 March 1895
- Commissioned: October 1895
- Fate: Sold Hong Kong, 1916

General characteristics
- Class & type: Handy-class destroyer
- Displacement: 275 long tons (279 t) light; 310 long tons (310 t) full load
- Length: 197 ft (60.05 m) oa
- Beam: 19 ft 5 in (5.92 m)
- Draught: 7 ft 6 in (2.29 m)
- Installed power: 4,000 hp (2,983 kW)
- Propulsion: 3 × Thornycroft boilers; 2 × vertical triple-expansion steam engines; 2 shafts
- Speed: 27 knots (50 km/h; 31 mph)
- Complement: 53
- Armament: 1 × 12 pounder gun; 3 × 6 pounder gun; 2 × 18 inch torpedo tubes

HMS Handy was a Handy-class destroyer which served with the Royal Navy. Built by Fairfield Shipbuilding and Engineering Company in 1895 she spent most of her time on the China Station, and was sold in Hong Kong during the Great War.

== Design and construction ==
As part of the 1893–1894 Naval Estimates, the British Admiralty placed orders for 36 torpedo-boat destroyers, all to be capable of 27 knots (50 km/h; 31 mph), as a follow-on to the six prototype "26-knotters" ordered in the previous 1892–1893 Estimates. Of the 36 destroyers, three ships (Handy, Hart and Hunter) were ordered from Fairfield Shipbuilding and Engineering Company of Govan, the first torpedo craft to be built by that shipyard. As typical for torpedo craft at the time, the Admiralty left detailed design to the builders, laying down only broad requirements.

Fairfield's design was 197 feet (60.05 m) long overall and 194 feet (59.13 m) between perpendiculars, with a beam of 19 feet 5 inches (5.92 m) and a draught of 7 feet 6 inches (2.29 m). Displacement was 275 long tons (279 t) light and 310 long tons (310 t) full load, while the ship's complement was 53 officers and men. Three Thornycroft boilers fed steam at 215 pounds per square inch (1,480 kPa) to two 3-cylinder triple expansion steam engines rated at 4,000 indicated horsepower (3,000 kW) and driving two propeller shafts. Two funnels were fitted. Armament consisted of a single QF 12 pounder 12 cwt (Note: "Cwt" is the abbreviation for hundredweight, 12cwt referring to the weight of the gun.) gun and three 6-pounder guns, with two 18 inch (450 mm) torpedo tubes. As a gunboat, one of the torpedo tubes could be removed to accommodate a further two six-pounders. (Note: While many of the 27-knotters later carried both the two torpedo tubes and all 5 six-pounder guns, stability concerns prevented Handy from following suit.)

Handy was laid down on 7 June 1894 and was launched on 9 March 1895. Handy reached a speed of 27.04 knots (50.08 km/h; 31.12 mph) during sea trials, and was commissioned in October 1895.

== Service ==
Handy was initially based at Portsmouth, her commanding officer, Reginald Tupper, becoming commander of the Portsmouth destroyer flotilla when the destroyers Boxer and Bruizer joined Handy in commission at Portsmouth in November 1895. The Fairfield-built Twenty-seven knotters were considered good sea boats, so suitable for service on overseas stations. Handy was sent out to Hong Kong in 1897–1898, a year after her sister ship Hart, to serve on the China Station, remaining there for the rest of her career. The bow structure of Handy required strengthening, (Note: Handy's commanding officer noted inwards and outwards movement of the bow plating and frames of about 2 inches (51 mm) in heavy seas.) which was carried out by April 1901.

In January 1901, Handy took part in the salvaging of the dredger Canton River, which had sunk in Hong Kong harbour during a Typhoon in November 1900, with Handy being used to pump air into the hull of the stricken vessel. In November 1911, when the Xinhai Revolution caused Zhang Mingqi, Viceroy of Liangguang to abandon his post, Handy ferried him from Canton to safety in Hong Kong.

Handy was paid off in 1912, and by March 1913 Handy was placed on the sale list. She was finally sold in Hong Kong in 1916.

== Notes ==
=== Bibliography ===
- Brassey, T.A. (1897). The Naval Annual 1897. Portsmouth, UK: J. Griffin and Co.
- Brown, D.K. (2003). Warrior to Dreadnought: Warship Development 1860–1905. London: Caxton Editions. ISBN 1-84067-5292.
- Chan Lau Kit-Ching (1990). China, Britain & Hong Kong 1895–1945. Hong Kong: The Chinese University Press. ISBN 962-201-409-7.
- Chesneau, Roger; Kolesnik, Eugene M, eds. (1979). Conway's All The World's Fighting Ships 1860–1905. London: Conway Maritime Press. ISBN 0-85177-133-5.
- Colledge, J. J.; Warlow, Ben (2006) [1969]. Ships of the Royal Navy: The Complete Record of All Fighting Ships of the Royal Navy from the 15th Century to the Present (3rd Rev ed.). London: Chatham Publishing. ISBN 978-1-86176-281-8. OCLC 67375475.
- Crowe, George (1903). The Commission of H.M.S. Terrible: 1898–1902. London: George Newnes.
- Friedman, Norman (2009). British Destroyers: From Earliest Days to the Second World War. Barnsley, UK: Seaforth Publishing. ISBN 978-1-84832-049-9.
- Gardiner, Robert; Gray, Randal, eds. (1985). Conway's All The World's Fighting Ships 1906–1921. London: Conway Maritime Press. ISBN 0-85177-245-5.
- Lyon, David (2001). The First Destroyers. London: Caxton Editions. ISBN 1-84067-3648.
- Manning, T. D. (1961). The British Destroyer. London: Putnam & Co. OCLC 6470051.
- March, Edgar J. (1966). British Destroyers: A History of Development, 1892–1953; Drawn by Admiralty Permission From Official Records & Returns, Ships' Covers & Building Plans. London: Seeley Service. OCLC 164893555.
