= HMS Dasher =

Five ships of the Royal Navy have been named HMS Dasher:

- HMS Dasher (1797) was an 18-gun sloop launched in Bermuda in 1797. She became a convict hulk in 1832 and was broken up in 1838.
- HMS Dasher (1837) was a wooden paddle packet launched in 1837 and sold in 1885.
- HMS Dasher (1894) was a Charger-class torpedo boat destroyer launched in 1894 and sold in 1912.
- HMS Dasher (D37) was an Avenger-class escort carrier launched in 1941. She was transferred to the Royal Navy under lend-lease in 1942 and was sunk in 1943.
- HMS Dasher (P280) is an Archer-class patrol vessel launched in 1986 and currently in service.
