= HMS Opossum (1895) =

Sunfish-class destroyer

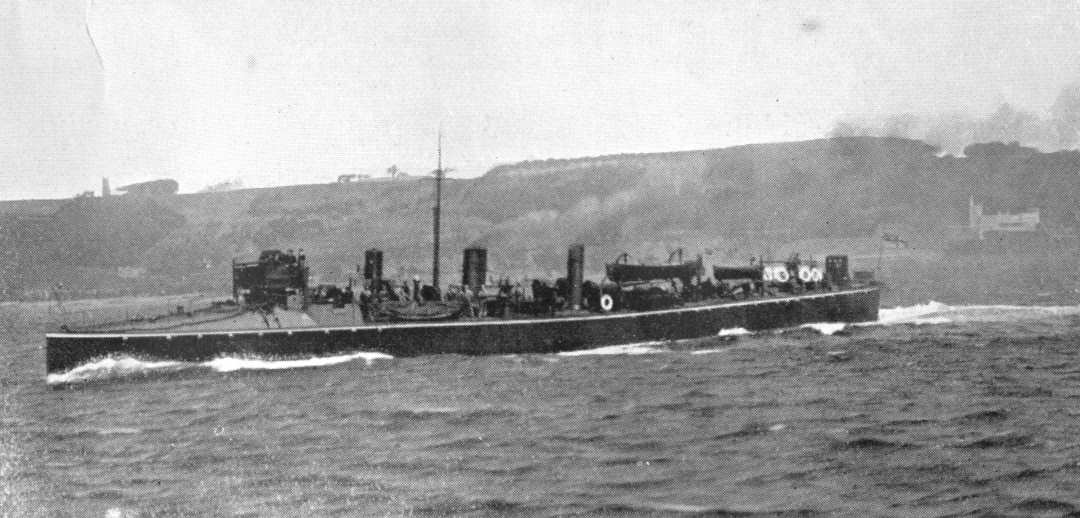
- Opossum in 1897

History

United Kingdom
- Name: HMS Opossum
- Ordered: 7 February 1894
- Builder: Hawthorn Leslie, Hebburn
- Laid down: 17 September 1894
- Launched: 9 August 1895
- Commissioned: March 1896
- Fate: Sold on 29 July 1920 for scrapping

General characteristics
- Class & type: Hawthorn Leslie "Twenty-seven knotter"
- Displacement: 310 long tons (310 t) light; 340 long tons (350 t) full load
- Length: 204 ft 0 in (62.18 m) oa
- Beam: 19 ft 0 in (5.79 m)
- Draught: 8 ft 7 in (2.62 m)
- Installed power: 4,000 ihp (3,000 kW)
- Propulsion: 8 × White water tube boilers; 2× multiple expansion steam engines driving 2 shafts
- Speed: 27 kn (50 km/h; 31 mph) (contract speed)
- Range: 1,175 nmi (2,176 km; 1,352 mi) at 11 kn (20 km/h; 13 mph)
- Complement: 53
- Armament: 1 × 12-pdr gun; 5 × 6-pdr guns; 2 × 18-inch torpedo tubes

HMS Opossum was a "twenty-seven knotter" torpedo boat destroyer of the British Royal Navy. Built by the Tyneside shipbuilder Hawthorn Leslie, Opossum was one of three destroyers built by Hawthorns that were ordered in 1894. She was launched in 1895 and completed in 1896. She remained in service during the First World War, where she was used for local patrol duties based at Plymouth and sank the German submarine UC-49 on 8 August 1918. She was sold for scrap in 1920.

== Design and construction ==
HMS Opossum, along with sister ships Sunfish and Ranger, was one of three destroyers ordered for the Royal Navy from Hawthorn Leslie on 7 February 1894 as part of the 1893–1894 Naval Estimates. A total of 36 destroyers were ordered from 14 shipbuilders as part of the 1893–1894 Naval Estimates, all of which were required to reach a contract speed of 27 knots (50 km/h; 31 mph). The Admiralty laid down broad requirements for the destroyers, including speed, the use of an arched turtleback (Note: A fore deck with exaggerated camber designed to throw off sea water at high speeds.) forecastle and armament, with the detailed design left to the builders, resulting in each of the builders producing different designs.

Opossum was 204 feet 0 inches (62.18 m) long overall and 200 feet 0 inches (60.96 m) between perpendiculars, with a beam of 19 feet 0 inches (5.79 m) and a draught of 8 feet 7 inches (2.62 m). Displacement was 310 long tons (310 t) light and 340 long tons (350 t) full load. Eight Yarrow boilers, with their uptakes trunked together to three funnels, fed steam at 185 pounds per square inch (1,280 kPa) to two triple-expansion steam engines, rated at 4,000 indicated horsepower (3,000 kW). Armament consisted of a single QF 12-pounder 12 cwt (Note: "Cwt" is the abbreviation for hundredweight, 12 cwt referring to the weight of the gun.) gun and three 6-pounder guns, with two 18-inch (450 mm) torpedo tubes. One of the torpedo tubes could be removed to accommodate a further two six-pounders. The ship's crew was 53 officers and men.

On 17 September 1895 Opossum was laid down as Yard Number 326 at Hawthorn Leslie's Hebburn, Tyneside shipyard, and was launched on 9 August 1895. The ship reached a speed of 28.24 kn (32.50 mph; 52.30 km/h) during sea trials, and was completed in February 1896. (Note: Lyon states that Opossum was launched on 4 October 1895 and completed in June 1896, the dates given in Friedman for sister ship Ranger.)

== Service ==
On 26 June 1897, Opossum took part in the naval review at Spithead to celebrate the Golden Jubilee of Queen Victoria. Opossum, based at Devonport, took part in the 1901 Royal Navy Naval Manoeuvres in July–August that year. In 1905, Opossum was one of a number of old destroyers which the Rear Admiral (Destroyers) condemned as being "..all worn out", with "every shilling spent on these old 27-knotters is a waste of money". In November 1907, Opossum was paid off for refitting at Chatham Dockyard, where her boilers were retubed, this refit continuing until June 1908.

On 30 August 1912 the Admiralty directed all destroyers were to be grouped into classes designated by letters based on contract speed and appearance. After 30 September 1913, as a 27-knotter, Opossum was assigned to the A class.

By February 1913, Opossum was not part of an active flotilla, but was attached as a tender to the shore establishment Vivid at Devonport, with a nucleus crew and was still attached to Vivid in July 1914, on the eve of the outbreak of the First World War.

By January 1915, Opossum was allocated to the Devonport Local Defence Flotilla. On 1 April 1917, Opossum took part in the salvage of the merchant ship SS Valacia, and her crew was later awarded salvage money. On the evening of 20 December 1917, Opossum, together with the destroyers Spitfire and Roebuck, five Motor Launches, four drifters and two fishing trawlers, was ordered to patrol Lyme Bay to search for a German submarine that had sunk three merchant ships the previous night. The submarine had already left the area, however.

On 8 August 1918, the German submarine UC-49 was laying a minefield off Start Point, Devon, when the submarine fouled one of her own mines. The resulting explosion was spotted by Opossum, which was on a routine anti-submarine patrol nearby. Opossum and several Motor Launches started a search for the submarine using Hydrophones and sweeps. UC-49 was assumed to by lying on the sea bed, and when the submarine restarted motors at 15:20 hr, the noise attracted several depth charges, and more depth charges were dropped at 17:57 hr. Opossum then noisily withdrew a distance of 2.5 nautical miles (4.6 km; 2.9 mi) in order to convince the submarine's commander that the hunt had been abandoned, and after 17 minutes the U-boat surfaced, only 200 yards (180 m) from one of the Motor Launches and 800 yards (730 m) from Opossum, and was brought under a heavy fire. After 20 seconds, the submarine descended under the surface again, with her bows at an angle of 50 degrees, and several more depth charges were dropped, bringing up oil and bubbles. The next day, the wreck, which had been located by sweeps, was plastered with depth charges in order to break it up to confirm that the submarine had been sunk. When debris including a light bulb manufactured in Vienna came to the surface, it was confirmed that the submarine had been destroyed.

Opossum remained part of the Devonport Local Defence Flotilla at the end of the war in November 1918. By March 1919, Opossum was laid up in reserve at Devonport, She was sold on 29 July 1920 to Ward for breaking up at their Preston yard.

== Pennant numbers ==
Pennant number	Date
D12	1914
D99	September 1915
D62	January 1918
