= A-class destroyer =

A-class destroyer may refer to:

- A-class destroyer (1929), Royal Navy destroyers
- A-class destroyer (1913), Royal Navy torpedo boat destroyers
