= HMS Sunfish =

Two vessels of the British Royal Navy have been named HMS Sunfish:

- HMS Sunfish (1895), a Sunfish-class destroyer launched on 23 May 1895 and sold on 7 June 1920.
- HMS Sunfish (81S), an S-class submarine launched at Chatham Dockyard on 30 September 1936 and transferred to Soviet Navy in 1944. The submarine was sunk by a British aircraft in a friendly fire incident on 27 July 1944 off Norway.
