= HMS Zebra (1895) =

Zebra-class destroyer

Class overview
- Operators: Royal Navy
- Preceded by: Swordfish class
- Succeeded by: Quail class
- Built: 1894–1895
- In commission: 1900–1914
- Completed: 1
- Scrapped: 1

History

United Kingdom
- Name: HMS Zebra
- Ordered: 7 February 1894
- Builder: Thames Iron Works, Bow Creek
- Laid down: 1 July 1894
- Launched: 13 December 1895
- Commissioned: January 1900
- Fate: Sold for scrap, 30 July 1914

General characteristics
- Class & type: none
- Displacement: 310 long tons (310 t) light; 365 long tons (371 t) full load
- Length: 204 ft 6 in (62.33 m) oa; 200 ft (61 m) pp
- Beam: 20 ft (6.1 m)
- Draught: 7 ft 6 in (2.29 m)
- Installed power: 4,800 ihp (3,600 kW)
- Propulsion: 3 × White water tube boilers; 2× multiple expansion steam engines driving 2 shafts
- Speed: 27 kn (31 mph; 50 km/h) (trials)
- Complement: 50
- Armament: 1 × 12-pdr gun; 5 × 6-pdr guns; 2 × torpedo tubes

HMS Zebra was a "Twenty-seven Knotter" destroyer of the Royal Navy, later classified as part of the A Class. Zebra was built by Thames Iron Works and launched in 1895 as the fifth Royal Navy ship to be named Zebra. Entering service in 1900, Zebra was sold for scrap in 1914.

== Construction ==
HMS Zebra was ordered on 7 February 1894 from Thames Iron Works, Blackwall, London as part of the British Admiralty's 1893–1894 shipbuilding programme, one of 36 "Twenty-seven Knotter" destroyers ordered from 14 different shipbuilders for this programme.

These destroyers were not of a standard design, with the Admiralty laying down broad requirements, including a trial speed of 27 knots (31 mph; 50 km/h), a "turtleback" forecastle and a standard armament of a QF 12 pounder 12 cwt (3 in (76 mm) calibre) gun on a platform on the ship's conning tower (in practice the platform was also used as the ship's bridge), with a secondary armament of five 6-pounder guns, and two 18-inch (450 mm) torpedo tubes. Thames Iron Work's design had three funnels, with the forward funnel widely separated from the other two, with one of the two torpedo tubes positioned in this gap. Three White water-tube boilers fed four-cylinder reciprocating steam engines rated at 4,800 ihp (3,600 kW) and driving two shafts.

Zebra was laid down on 1 July 1894 and launched on 13 December 1895. Thames Iron Works was relatively inexperienced in building torpedo craft (it had previously built the hull of a single torpedo boat as a subcontractor for Maudslay, Sons and Field (who supplied the engines for Zebra) and it took a long time for the ship to be completed and to complete trials (where she eventually reached the contract speed of 27 knots), not being accepted by the Navy until January 1900.

Zebra was not particularly successful in service and no further orders for destroyers were placed with Thames Iron Works for many years.

== Operational history ==
HMS Zebra served in British home waters for the whole of her career. In January 1900 she was employed as tender to the Wildfire, special service vessel, for training duties in connection with Sheerness Naval School of Gunnery. On 17 October 1900, Zebra collided with the barge Emily off Sheerness, sinking the barge and damaging the destroyer's bow. Zebra rescued the barge's crew. The following year she participated in the 1901 British Naval Manoeuvres. In March 1902 Lieutenant James W. G. Innes was appointed in command, but the appointment was cancelled and Lieutenant Wyndham L. Bamber was appointed in command the following month. She served in the Portsmouth Instructional flotilla in May 1902, and took part in the fleet review held at Spithead on 16 August 1902 for the coronation of King Edward VII.

Zebra formed part of the 6th Destroyer Flotilla in 1910, and in 1912. On 14 June 1911 the destroyer Zephyr collided with Zebra during night exercises off the mouth of the River Thames. One of Zebra's six-pounder guns and two of her boats were knocked into the sea, but no crew were injured. After repair, Zebra was attached to the submarine flotilla based at Dundee, relieving the destroyer Teazer.

On 30 August 1912 the Admiralty directed all destroyers were to be grouped into classes designated by letters based on contract speed and appearance. Like all the surviving Twenty-six and Twenty-seven Knotters, Zebra was assigned to the A Class. The class letters were painted on the hull below the bridge area and on a funnel.

By March 1913, Zebra was laid up at Sheerness and listed for sale. Zebra was sold for scrapping on 30 July 1914.

== Bibliography ==
- Brassey, T.A. (1902). The Naval Annual 1902. Portsmouth, UK: J. Griffin and Co.
- Chesneau, Roger & Kolesnik, Eugene M., eds. (1979). Conway's All The World's Fighting Ships 1860–1905. London: Conway Maritime Press. ISBN 0-85177-133-5.
- Colledge, J. J.; Warlow, Ben (2006) [1969]. Ships of the Royal Navy: The Complete Record of All Fighting Ships of the Royal Navy from the 15th Century to the Present (3rd Rev ed.). London: Chatham Publishing. ISBN 978-1-86176-281-8. OCLC 67375475.
- Friedman, Norman (2009). British Destroyers: From Earliest Days to the Second World War. Barnsley, UK: Seaforth Publishing. ISBN 978-1-84832-049-9.
- Gardiner, Robert & Gray, Randal, eds. (1985). Conway's All The World's Fighting Ships 1906–1921. London: Conway Maritime Press. ISBN 0-85177-245-5.
- Lyon, David (2001) [1996]. The First Destroyers. London: Caxton Editions. ISBN 1-84067-3648.
- Manning, T. D. (1961). The British Destroyer. London: Putnam & Co. OCLC 6470051.
- March, Edgar J. (1966). British Destroyers: A History of Development, 1892–1953; Drawn by Admiralty Permission From Official Records & Returns, Ships' Covers & Building Plans. London: Seeley Service. OCLC 164893555.
