= Handy-class destroyer =

Subclass of the A-class destroyers

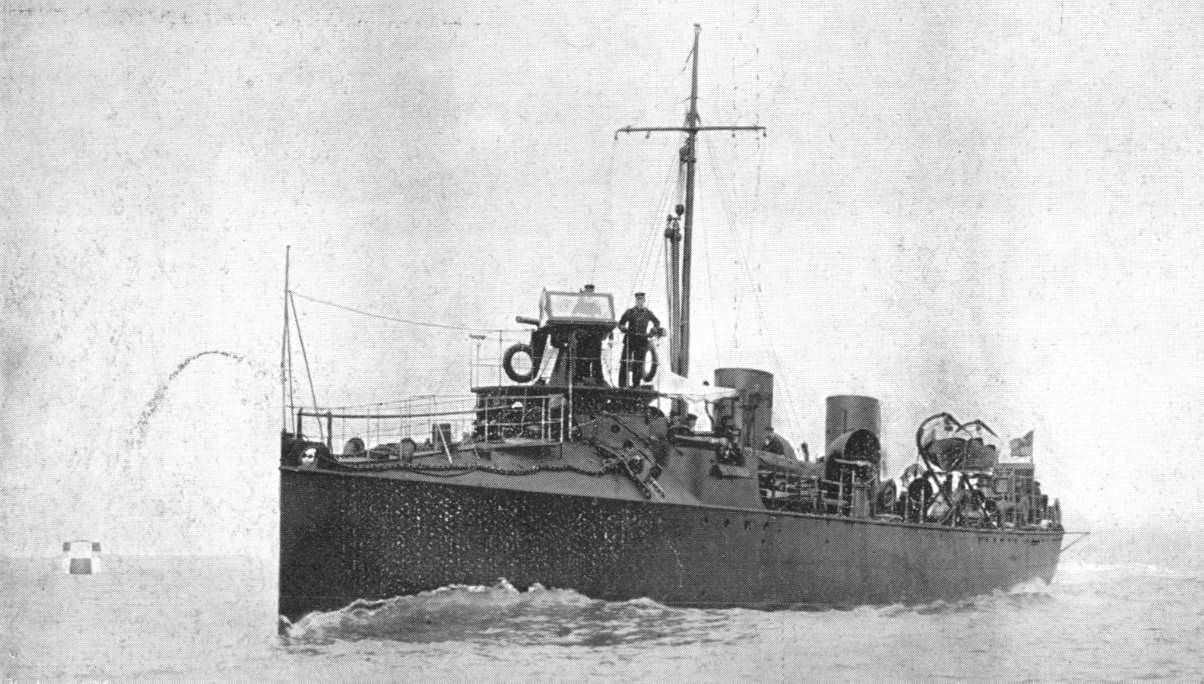
- HMS Hunter

Class overview
- Name: Handy class
- Builders: Fairfields, Govan
- Operators: Royal Navy
- Preceded by: Banshee class
- Succeeded by: Sunfish class
- Built: 1895
- In commission: 1895–1914
- Completed: 3
- Retired: 3

General characteristics
- Type: Torpedo boat destroyer
- Displacement: 275 long tons (279 t)
- Length: 194 ft (59 m)
- Propulsion: Thornycroft boilers, 4,000 hp (2,983 kW)
- Speed: 27 knots (50 km/h; 31 mph)
- Complement: 53
- Armament: 1 × 12-pounder gun; 2 × torpedo tubes

Three Handy-class destroyers served with the Royal Navy. Handy, Hart and Hunter were all built by Fairfield.

== Design and construction ==
As part of the 1893–1894 Naval Estimates, the British Admiralty placed orders for 36 torpedo-boat destroyers, all to be capable of 27 knots (50 km/h; 31 mph), as a follow-on to the six prototype "26-knotters" ordered in the previous 1892–1893 Estimates. Of the 36 destroyers, three ships (Handy, Hart and Hunter) were ordered from Fairfield Shipbuilding and Engineering Company of Govan, the first torpedo craft to be built by that shipyard. As typical for torpedo craft at the time, the Admiralty left detailed design to the builders, laying down only broad requirements.

Fairfield's design was 197 feet (60.05 m) long overall and 194 feet (59.13 m) between perpendiculars, with a beam of 19 feet 5 inches (5.92 m) and a draught of 7 feet 6 inches (2.29 m). Displacement was 275 long tons (279 t) light and 310 long tons (310 t) full load, while the ship's complement was 53 officers and men. Three Thornycroft boilers fed steam at 215 pounds per square inch (1,480 kPa) to two 3-cylinder triple expansion steam engines rated at 4,000 indicated horsepower (3,000 kW) and driving two propeller shafts. Two funnels were fitted. Armament consisted of a single QF 12 pounder 12 cwt (Note: "Cwt" is the abbreviation for hundredweight, 12cwt referring to the weight of the gun.) gun and three 6-pounder guns, with two 18 inch (450 mm) torpedo tubes. As a gunboat, one of the torpedo tubes could be removed to accommodate a further two six-pounders. (Note: While many of the 27-knotters later carried both the two torpedo tubes and all 5 six-pounder guns, stability concerns prevented Handy from following suit.)

In September 1913 the Admiralty re-classed all the surviving 27-knotter destroyers as A Class, although this only applied to Handy herself as the other two ships had already been sold for scrap in 1912.

== See also ==
- A-class destroyer (1913)
