= Hardy-class destroyer =

Subclass of the A-class destroyers

Class overview
- Name: Hardy class
- Builders: William Doxford & Sons, Sunderland
- Operators: Royal Navy
- Preceded by: Charger class
- Succeeded by: Janus class
- Built: 1895
- In commission: 1895–1912
- Completed: 2
- Retired: 2

General characteristics
- Type: Torpedo boat destroyer
- Displacement: 260 long tons (264 t) (light); 325 long tons (330 t) (full load)
- Length: 200 ft 3 in (61.04 m) (overall); 196 ft (60 m) (between perpendiculars)
- Beam: 19 ft (5.8 m)
- Draught: 7 ft 9 in (2.36 m)
- Propulsion: 2 sets vertical triple expansion engines; 8 Yarrow boilers
- Speed: 27 knots (50 km/h; 31 mph)
- Complement: 53
- Armament: 1 × 12-pounder gun; 5 × 6-pounder guns; 2 × torpedo tubes

Two Hardy-class destroyers served with the Royal Navy. HMS Hardy and HMS Haughty were both built by Doxford, ordered on 3 November 1893. They were fitted with 8 Yarrow boilers. They displaced 260 tons, were 196 feet long and were armed with one twelve pounder quick-firing gun mounted forward and five 6-pounder guns, mounted on the broadside and aft, and two torpedo tubes on a revolving mount. They carried 53 officers and men, and served in home waters (although Hardy was briefly in the Mediterranean in 1900) before being sold off in 1911 and 1912 respectively.

As part of the 1893–1894 Naval Estimates, the British Admiralty placed orders for 36 torpedo-boat destroyers, all to be capable of 27 knots (50 km/h; 31 mph), the "27-knotters", as a follow-on to the six prototype "26-knotters" ordered in the previous 1892–1893 Estimates. As was typical for torpedo craft at the time, the Admiralty left detailed design to the builders, laying down only broad requirements.

== See also ==
- A-class destroyer (1913)

== Bibliography ==
- Chesneau, Roger & Kolesnik, Eugene M., eds. (1979). Conway's All The World's Fighting Ships 1860–1905. London: Conway Maritime Press. ISBN 0-85177-133-5.
- Colledge, J. J.; Warlow, Ben (2006) [1969]. Ships of the Royal Navy: The Complete Record of All Fighting Ships of the Royal Navy from the 15th Century to the Present (3rd Rev ed.). London: Chatham Publishing. ISBN 978-1-86176-281-8. OCLC 67375475.
- Dittmar, F.J.; Colledge, J.J. (1972). British Warships 1914–1919. Shepperton, UK: Ian Allan. ISBN 0-7110-0380-7.
- Friedman, Norman (2009). British Destroyers: From Earliest Days to the Second World War. Barnsley, UK: Seaforth Publishing. ISBN 978-1-84832-049-9.
- Gardiner, Robert & Gray, Randal, eds. (1985). Conway's All The World's Fighting Ships 1906–1921. London: Conway Maritime Press. ISBN 0-85177-245-5.
- Lyon, David (2001) [1996]. The First Destroyers. London: Caxton Editions. ISBN 1-84067-3648.
- Manning, T. D. (1961). The British Destroyer. London: Putnam & Co.
- March, Edgar J. (1966). British Destroyers: A History of Development, 1892–1953; Drawn by Admiralty Permission From Official Records & Returns, Ships' Covers & Building Plans. London: Seeley Service. OCLC 164893555.
