= HMS Ranger (1895) =

Sunfish-class destroyer

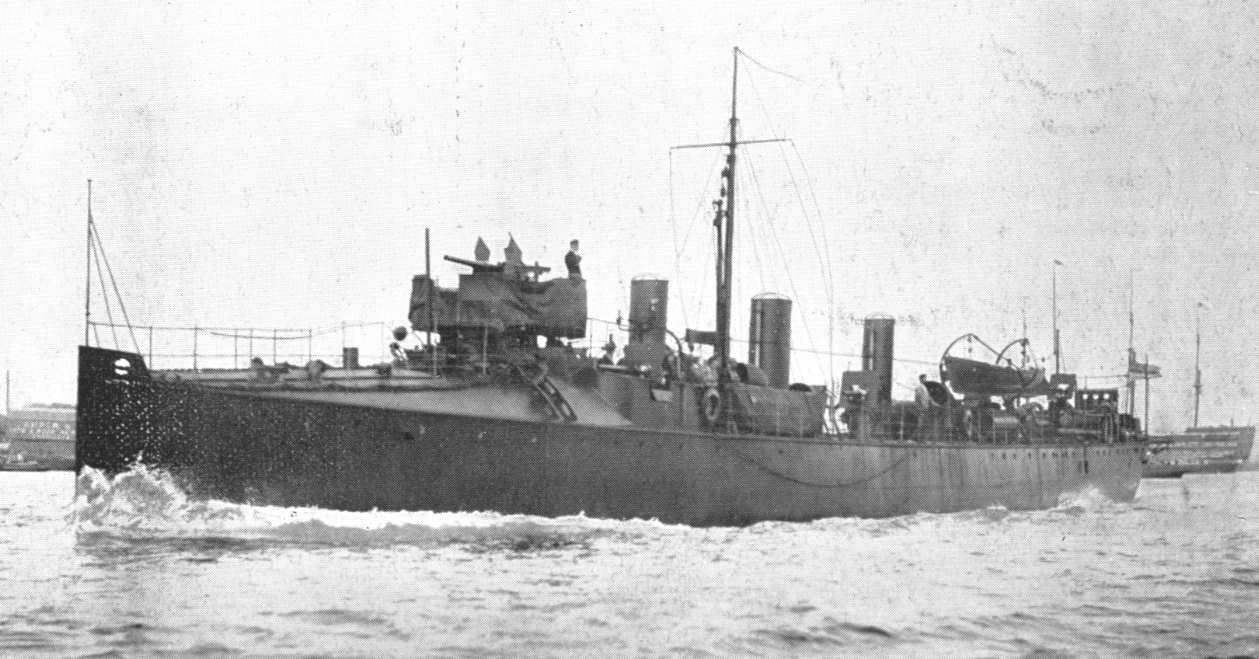
- Ranger in 1895–1897

History

United Kingdom
- Name: HMS Ranger
- Ordered: 7 February 1894
- Builder: Hawthorn Leslie, Hebburn
- Laid down: 17 September 1894
- Launched: 4 October 1895
- Commissioned: June 1896
- Fate: Sold for scrap on 20 May 1920

General characteristics
- Class & type: Hawthorn Leslie "Twenty-seven knotter"
- Displacement: 310 long tons (310 t) light; 340 long tons (350 t) full load
- Length: 204 ft 0 in (62.18 m) oa
- Beam: 19 ft 0 in (5.79 m)
- Draught: 8 ft 7 in (2.62 m)
- Installed power: 4,000 ihp (3,000 kW)
- Propulsion: 8 × White water tube boilers; 2× multiple expansion steam engines driving 2 shafts
- Speed: 27 kn (50 km/h; 31 mph) (contract speed)
- Range: 1,175 nmi (2,176 km; 1,352 mi) at 11 kn (20 km/h; 13 mph)
- Complement: 53
- Armament: 1 × 12-pdr gun; 5 × 6-pdr guns; 2 × 18-inch torpedo tubes

HMS Ranger was a "twenty-seven knotter" torpedo boat destroyer of the British Royal Navy. Built by the Tyneside shipbuilder Hawthorn Leslie, Opossum was one of three destroyers built by Hawthorns that were ordered in 1894. She was launched in 1895 and completed in 1896. She remained in service during the First World War, where she was used for local patrol duties. She was sold for scrap in 1920.

== Design and construction ==
HMS Ranger, along with sister ships Sunfish and Opossum, was one of three destroyers ordered for the Royal Navy from Hawthorn Leslie on 7 February 1894 as part of the 1893–1894 Naval Estimates. A total of 36 destroyers were ordered from 14 shipbuilders as part of the 1893–1894 Naval Estimates, all of which were required to reach a contract speed of 27 knots (50 km/h; 31 mph). The Admiralty laid down broad requirements for the destroyers, including speed, the use of an arched turtleback (Note: A fore deck with exaggerated camber designed to throw off sea water at high speeds.) forecastle and armament, with the detailed design left to the builders, resulting in each of the builders producing different designs.

Ranger was 204 feet 0 inches (62.18 m) long overall and 200 feet 0 inches (60.96 m) between perpendiculars, with a beam of 19 feet 0 inches (5.79 m) and a draught of 8 feet 7 inches (2.62 m). Displacement was 310 long tons (310 t) light and 340 long tons (350 t) full load. Eight Yarrow boilers, with their uptakes trunked together to three funnels, fed steam at 185 pounds per square inch (1,280 kPa) to two triple-expansion steam engines, rated at 4,000 indicated horsepower (3,000 kW). Armament consisted of a single QF 12-pounder 12 cwt (Note: "Cwt" is the abbreviation for hundredweight, 12 cwt referring to the weight of the gun.) gun and three 6-pounder guns, with two 18-inch (450 mm) torpedo tubes. One of the torpedo tubes could be removed to accommodate a further two six-pounders. The ship's crew was 53 officers and men.

On 17 September 1895, Ranger was laid down as Yard Number 327 at Hawthorn Leslie's Hebburn, Tyneside shipyard, and was launched on 4 October 1895. The ship reached a speed of 27.13 kn (31.22 mph; 50.24 km/h) during sea trials, and was completed in June 1896. (Note: Lyon states that Ranger was laid down on 28 August 1894, launched on 28 May 1895 and completed in February 1896, the dates given in Friedman for sister ship Sunfish.)

== Service ==
In July 1896 Ranger was in reserve at Chatham. On 26 June 1897, Ranger took part in the naval review at Spithead to celebrate the Golden Jubilee of Queen Victoria. In 1901, Ranger was based at Portsmouth. Lieutenant Spencer Reginald Strettell Richards was appointed in command on 29 November 1902, when she was part of the Medway Instructional flotilla. In 1905, Ranger was one of a number of old destroyers which the Rear Admiral (Destroyers) condemned as being "..all worn out", with "every shilling spent on these old 27-knotters is a waste of money". He recommended that they be withdrawn from flotilla use and used either as tenders to training schools, or as local defence torpedo boats, or disposed of.

On 2 July 1908, during the annual Naval Manoeuvres, Ranger was steaming in company with the cruiser Topaze in thick fog near the Outer Dowsing lightvessel, when the destroyer Haughty collided with her. While Haughty's bow was only slightly twisted, the damage to Ranger was more severe, with her hull holed close to the waterline. The hole was patched with canvas, and Ranger made it to Chatham Dockyard under her own steam. She returned to her flotilla after repair on 14 July. In August 1910, Ranger, now part of the Nore Destroyer Flotilla, was repaired at Sheerness dockyard after being damaged by colliding with a pier head at Yarmouth. On 5 November that year, Ranger, now part of the 6th Destroyer Flotilla, ran aground off Selsey Bill, damaging her propellers, so she had to be towed into Portsmouth harbour. In June 1911, Ranger collided with the pleasure steamer King Edward at the entrance to Torquay harbour. Ranger was holed below the waterline and was brought into Devonport Dockyard for repair by the battleship Victorious.

On 30 August 1912 the Admiralty directed all destroyers were to be grouped into classes designated by letters based on contract speed and appearance. After 30 September 1913, as a 27-knotter, Ranger was assigned to the A class.

By March 1913, Ranger was not part of an active flotilla, but was attached as a tender to the shore establishment Vivid at Devonport, with a nucleus crew, but by May that year was listed as for sale at Devonport.

The outbreak of the First World War stopped the sale of the ship, and by March 1915, Ranger was listed as part of the Seventh Destroyer Flotilla, a patrol flotilla based on the East coast of Britain. By April, however, she was part of the Local Defence Flotilla at Portsmouth. Ranger was still part of the Portsmouth Local Defence Flotilla in January 1917, but by March that year, was no longer listed as being part of that unit.

Ranger was sold for scrap on 20 May 1920.

== Pennant numbers ==
Pennant number	From	To
D1A	September 1915	April 1917
