= HMS Sunfish (1895) =

Sunfish-class destroyer

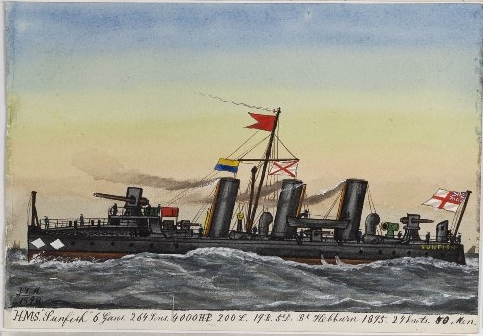
- Sunfish

History

United Kingdom
- Name: HMS Sunfish
- Ordered: 7 February 1894
- Builder: Hawthorn Leslie, Hebburn
- Laid down: 17 September 1894
- Launched: 28 May 1895
- Commissioned: 1896
- Fate: Sold for scrap on 7 June 1920

General characteristics
- Class & type: Hawthorn Leslie "Twenty-seven knotter"
- Displacement: 310 long tons (310 t) light; 340 long tons (350 t) full load
- Length: 204 ft 0 in (62.18 m) oa
- Beam: 19 ft 0 in (5.79 m)
- Draught: 8 ft 7 in (2.62 m)
- Installed power: 4,000 ihp (3,000 kW)
- Propulsion: 8 × White water tube boilers; 2× multiple expansion steam engines driving 2 shafts
- Speed: 27 kn (50 km/h; 31 mph) (contract speed)
- Range: 1,175 nmi (2,176 km; 1,352 mi) at 11 kn (20 km/h; 13 mph)
- Complement: 53
- Armament: 1 × 12-pdr gun; 5 × 6-pdr guns; 2 × 18-inch torpedo tubes

HMS Sunfish was a "twenty-seven knotter" torpedo boat destroyer of the British Royal Navy. Built by the Tyneside shipbuilder Hawthorn Leslie, Sunfish was one of three Sunfish-class destroyers built by Hawthorns and laid down in 1894. She was sold for scrap in 1920.

== Design and construction ==
HMS Sunfish, along with sister ships Opossum and Ranger, was one of three destroyers ordered for the Royal Navy from Hawthorn Leslie on 7 February 1894 as part of the 1893–1894 Naval Estimates. A total of 36 destroyers were ordered from 14 shipbuilders as part of the 1893–1894 Naval Estimates, all of which were required to reach a contract speed of 27 knots (50 km/h; 31 mph). The Admiralty laid down broad requirements for the destroyers, including speed, the use of an arched turtleback (Note: A turtleback is an arched structure over the deck of a ship, normally at the ship's bow, to protect against reach seas.) forecastle and armament, with the detailed design left to the builders, resulting in each of the builders producing different designs.

Sunfish was 204 feet 0 inches (62.18 m) long overall and 200 feet 0 inches (60.96 m) between perpendiculars, with a beam of 19 feet 0 inches (5.79 m) and a draught of 8 feet 7 inches (2.62 m). Displacement was 310 long tons (310 t) light and 340 long tons (350 t) full load. Eight Yarrow boilers, with their uptakes trunked together to three funnels, fed steam at 185 pounds per square inch (1,280 kPa) to two triple-expansion steam engines, rated at 4,000 indicated horsepower (3,000 kW). Armament consisted of a single QF 12-pounder 12 cwt (Note: "Cwt" is the abbreviation for hundredweight, 12 cwt referring to the weight of the gun.) gun and three 6-pounder guns, with two 18-inch (450 mm) torpedo tubes. One of the torpedo tubes could be removed to accommodate a further two six-pounders. The ship's crew was 53 officers and men.

On 17 September 1895 Sunfish was laid down as Yard Number 325 at Hawthorn Leslie's Hebburn, Tyneside shipyard, and was launched on 28 May 1895. The ship reached a speed of 27.62 knots (51.15 km/h; 31.78 mph) during sea trials, and was completed in February 1896.

== Service ==
Sunfish was commissioned at Chatham on 18 February 1896, replacing the destroyer Havock as tender to the battleship Royal Sovereign as part of the Channel Fleet, with Havock's crew transferring over to Sunfish. Sunfish took part in the 1896 British Naval Manoeuvres, attached to the Channel Fleet operation from Berehaven in southern Ireland. She was commissioned by Lieutenant Robert Gordon Douglas Dewar to be among several ships sent to strengthen the Mediterranean Fleet from April 1900, but boiler problems caused her to be laid up at Malta from August 1900 to May 1902 while the boilers were re-tubed and the bottom reservoirs repaired. In June 1902 she left for Gibraltar, and early the following month she arrived at Plymouth, and proceeded to Chatham to pay off. Lieutenant John M. D. E. Warren was appointed in command on 2 August 1902, when she joined the Medway instructional flotilla. A month later, her stem was damaged during docking at Dundee in a gale, but she rejoined the flotilla in mid-October after repairs. In 1905, Sunfish was one of a number of old destroyers which the Rear Admiral (Destroyers) condemned as being "..all worn out", with "every shilling spent on these old 27-knotters is a waste of money".

Sunfish formed part of the Sixth Destroyer Flotilla at Devonport in 1910, and remained a part of that flotilla in 1912. On 5 June 1911 Sunfish hit the bow of the destroyer Havock when clearing her moorings at Waterford Harbour, and then when trying to get clear of Havock, collided with the Torpedo boat Torpedo Boat 045. Sunfish was slightly damaged and returned to Devonport for repair. On 30 August 1912 the Admiralty directed all destroyers were to be grouped into classes designated by letters based on contract speed and appearance. After 30 September 1913, as a 27-knotter, Sunfish was assigned to the A class.

By February 1913, Sunfish was not part of an active flotilla, but was attached as a tender to the shore establishment Vivid at Devonport, with a nucleus crew and was still attached to Vivid in July 1914, on the eve of the outbreak of the First World War.

By January 1915, Sunfish was allocated to the Devonport Local Defence Flotilla. On 23 July 1917, Sunfish, still part of the Devonport Local Defence Flotilla, was involved in operations to hunt a submarine that had been spotted in Lyme Bay. Despite the submarine being spotted on the surface by a Motor Launch, the hunt was unsuccessful, with the submarine escaping. Sunfish remained at Devonport until the end of the war.

Sunfish was sold for scrap on 7 June 1920.

== Pennant numbers ==
Pennant number	From	To
D47	6 Dec 1914	1 Sep 1915
D2A	1 Sep 1915	1 January 1918
D81	1 January 1918	-
