= Banshee-class destroyer =

Subclass of the A-class destroyers

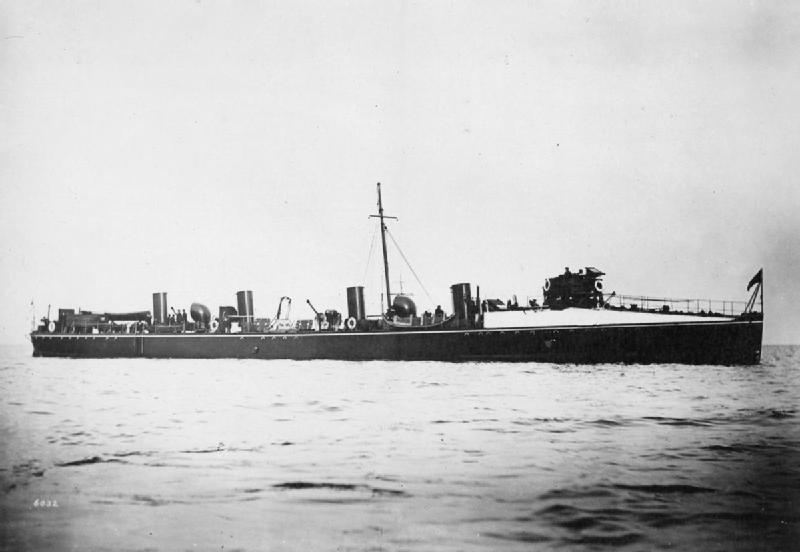
- Banshee

Class overview
- Name: Banshee class
- Builders: Cammell Laird
- Operators: Royal Navy
- Preceded by: Salmon class
- Succeeded by: Handy class
- Built: 1894
- In commission: 1894 to 1912
- Completed: 3
- Scrapped: 3

General characteristics
- Type: Torpedo boat destroyer
- Displacement: 290 long tons (295 t)
- Length: 210 ft (64 m)
- Beam: 19 ft (5.8 m)
- Draught: 7 ft (2.1 m)
- Speed: 27 knots (50 km/h; 31 mph)
- Complement: 53
- Armament: 1 × 12-pounder gun; 5 × 6-pounder guns; 2 × 18-inch torpedo tubes

The Banshee class was a class of three torpedo boat destroyers that served with the Royal Navy into the early part of the Twentieth century.

Under the 1893–1894 Naval Programme, the British Admiralty placed orders for 36 torpedo-boat destroyers, all to be capable of 27 knots (50 km/h; 31 mph), the "27-knotters", as a follow-on to the six prototype "26-knotters" ordered in the previous 1892–1893 Estimates. As was typical for torpedo craft at the time, the Admiralty left detailed design to the builders, laying down only broad requirements.

The three ships, Banshee, Contest and Dragon were all ordered on 7 February 1894 to be built by Laird at Birkenhead. Displacing 290 tons, they carried one 12-pounder gun and five 6-pounder guns, plus two 18-inch torpedo tubes in a trainable twin deck mounting. With 4,400 horsepower (3,300 kW) they made a speed of 27 knots (50 km/h).

The ships had a length of 210 ft (64 m), beam 19 ft (5.8 m) and draught of 7 ft (2.1 m) and carried a complement of 2 officers and 51 men. Banshee and Dragon were deployed to the Mediterranean in 1896 and remained there for the rest of their service lives, until coming home in 1911 to be paid off; Contest spent her whole service life in Home waters.

Along with the similar Ferret-class torpedo boat destroyers built under the 1892-1893 Programme, they were all disposed of in 1911/1912.

== Ships ==
All three were built by Laird Brothers at Birkenhead (which was to become Cammell Laird & Co. in 1903)

| Name | Yard number | Laid down | Launched | Completed | Fate |
|---|---|---|---|---|---|
| HMS Banshee | 598 | 1 March 1894 | 17 November 1894 | July 1895 | Sold for scrap 10 April 1912, to Thos. W. Ward, Briton Ferry |
| HMS Contest | 599 | 1 March 1894 | 1 December 1894 | July 1895 | Sold for scrap 11 July 1911, to Thos. W. Ward, Preston. |
| HMS Dragon | 600 | 15 December 1894 | 7 May 1897 | July 1895 | Sold for scrap 9 December 1912, to West of Scotland Ship Breaking Co, at Troon. |

== See also ==
- A-class destroyer (1913)

== Bibliography ==
- Chesneau, Roger & Kolesnik, Eugene M., eds. (1979). Conway's All The World's Fighting Ships 1860–1905. London: Conway Maritime Press. ISBN 0-85177-133-5.
- Colledge, J. J.; Warlow, Ben (2006) [1969]. Ships of the Royal Navy: The Complete Record of All Fighting Ships of the Royal Navy from the 15th Century to the Present (3rd Rev ed.). London: Chatham Publishing. ISBN 978-1-86176-281-8. OCLC 67375475.
- Friedman, Norman (2009). British Destroyers: From Earliest Days to the Second World War. Barnsley, UK: Seaforth Publishing. ISBN 978-1-84832-049-9.
- Gardiner, Robert & Gray, Randal, eds. (1985). Conway's All The World's Fighting Ships 1906–1921. London: Conway Maritime Press. ISBN 0-85177-245-5.
- Lyon, David (2001) [1996]. The First Destroyers. London: Caxton Editions. ISBN 1-84067-364-8.
- Manning, T. D. (1961). The British Destroyer. Putnam & Co. OCLC 6470051.
- March, Edgar J. (1966). British Destroyers: A History of Development, 1892–1953; Drawn by Admiralty Permission From Official Records & Returns, Ships' Covers & Building Plans. London: Seeley Service. OCLC 164893555.
