= HMS Hasty (1894) =

Charger-class destroyer

History

United Kingdom
- Name: HMS Hasty
- Builder: Yarrow Shipbuilders, Poplar, London
- Laid down: December 1893
- Launched: 16 June 1894
- Completed: May 1896
- Fate: Scrapped, 1912

General characteristics
- Class & type: Charger-class destroyer
- Displacement: 255 long tons (259 t)
- Length: 195 ft (59 m)
- Beam: 18.5 ft (5.6 m)
- Draught: 7.25 ft (2.2 m)
- Propulsion: vertical triple-expansion steam engines; Coal-fired Normand boilers; 3,800 hp (2,834 kW)
- Speed: 27 knots (50 km/h; 31 mph)
- Armament: 1 × QF 12-pounder gun; 3 × 18 inch (450 mm) torpedo tubes

HMS Hasty was a Charger-class destroyer which served with the Royal Navy. She was launched by Yarrow Shipbuilders in 1894, served in home waters and was sold off in 1912.

== Construction and design ==
On 12 October 1893, the British Admiralty placed an order for three torpedo boat destroyers (Charger, Dasher and Hasty) with the shipbuilder Yarrow under the 1893–1894 shipbuilding programme for the Royal Navy as a follow-on to the two prototype destroyers (Havock and Hornet) ordered from Yarrows under the 1892–1893 programme. (Note: Three more destroyers were ordered from Thornycroft on the same date, while a further 30 destroyers were later ordered from other shipbuilders under the same programme.)

The Admiralty did not specify a standard design for destroyers, laying down broad requirements, including a trial speed of 27 knots (31 mph; 50 km/h), a "turtleback" (Note: A fore deck with exaggerated camber designed to throw off sea water at high speeds.) forecastle and armament, which was to vary depending on whether the ship was to be used in the torpedo boat or gunboat role. As a torpedo boat, the planned armament was a single QF 12 pounder 12 cwt (3 in (76 mm) calibre) gun on a platform on the ship's conning tower (in practice the platform was also used as the ship's bridge), together with a secondary gun armament of three 6-pounder guns, and two 18 inch (450 mm) torpedo tubes. As a gunboat, one of the torpedo tubes could be removed to accommodate a further two six-pounders.

Yarrow's design was 195 feet 0 inches (59.44 m) long overall and 190 feet 8 inches (58.12 m) between perpendiculars, with a beam of 18 feet 6 inches (5.64 m) and a draught of 11 feet 3 inches (3.43 m). Displacement was 255 long tons (259 t) light and 295 long tons (300 t) full load. Two locomotive boilers fed steam at 180 pounds per square inch (1,200 kPa) to two three-cylinder triple expansion engines. The machinery was rated at 3,000 indicated horsepower (2,200 kW). Two funnels were fitted.

Hasty was laid down at Yarrow's Poplar, London shipyard in December 1893 as Yard number 993 and was launched on 16 June 1894. She reached a speed of 26.08 knots (30.01 mph; 48.30 km/h) during sea trials. She was completed in May 1896, at a cost of £41,141. Locomotive boilers were being made obsolete by water-tube boilers by the time of her completion, and she was refitted at Earle's Shipbuilding in 1899–1890 with water-tube boilers changing to a three-funneled configuration.

== Service history ==
In 1896 Hasty was in reserve at Portsmouth. Hasty took part in the fleet review held at Spithead on 16 August 1902 for the coronation of King Edward VII. In December 1902 she was moved from Portsmouth to Devonport.

Hasty was sold to Cox for scrapping at their Falmouth yard on 9 July 1912.

== Bibliography ==
- Brassey, T.A. (1897). The Naval Annual 1897. Portsmouth, UK: J. Griffin and Co.
- Chesneau, Roger & Kolesnik, Eugene M., eds. (1979). Conway's All The World's Fighting Ships 1860–1905. London: Conway Maritime Press. ISBN 0-85177-133-5.
- Colledge, J. J.; Warlow, Ben (2006) [1969]. Ships of the Royal Navy: The Complete Record of All Fighting Ships of the Royal Navy from the 15th Century to the Present (3rd Rev ed.). London: Chatham Publishing. ISBN 978-1-86176-281-8. OCLC 67375475.
- Friedman, Norman (2009). British Destroyers: From Earliest Days to the Second World War. Barnsley, UK: Seaforth Publishing. ISBN 978-1-84832-049-9.
- Gardiner, Robert & Gray, Randal, eds. (1985). Conway's All The World's Fighting Ships 1906–1921. London: Conway Maritime Press. ISBN 0-85177-245-5.
- Gardiner, Robert; Lambert, Andrew, eds. (1992). Steam, Steel & Shellfire: The Steam Warship 1815–1905. Conway's History of the Ship. London: Conway Maritime Press. ISBN 0-85177-564-0.
- Lyon, David (2001) [1996]. The First Destroyers. London: Caxton Editions. ISBN 1-84067-364-8.
- Manning, T. D. (1961). The British Destroyer. Putnam & Co. OCLC 6470051.
- March, Edgar J. (1966). British Destroyers: A History of Development, 1892–1953; Drawn by Admiralty Permission From Official Records & Returns, Ships' Covers & Building Plans. London: Seeley Service. OCLC 164893555.
