= Salmon-class destroyer =

Subclass of A-class destroyers

Class overview
- Name: Salmon class
- Builders: Earle's Shipbuilding, Hull
- Operators: Royal Navy
- Preceded by: Janus class
- Succeeded by: Banshee class
- Built: 1895
- In commission: 1895–1912
- Completed: 2
- Scrapped: 2

General characteristics
- Type: Torpedo Boat Destroyer
- Displacement: 305 long tons (310 t)
- Length: 200 ft (61 m)
- Propulsion: Yarrow boilers, 3,600 hp (2,685 kW)
- Speed: 27 knots (50 km/h; 31 mph)
- Armament: 1 × 12 pounder gun; 2 × torpedo tubes

The Salmon class were two destroyers built by Earle's to an Admiralty specification for service with the Royal Navy.

Under the 1893–1894 Naval Estimates, the British Admiralty placed orders for 36 torpedo-boat destroyers, all to be capable of 27 knots (50 km/h; 31 mph), the "27-knotters", as a follow-on to the six prototype "26-knotters" ordered in the previous 1892–1893 Estimates. As was typical for torpedo craft at the time, the Admiralty left detailed design to the builders, laying down only broad requirements.

HMS Salmon and HMS Snapper were launched in 1895. They displaced 305 tons, were 200 feet (61 m) long and their Yarrow boilers produced 3,600 hp (2,700 kW) which gave them the intended top speed of 27 knots. They were armed with one 12-pounder gun and two torpedo tubes. They carried a complement of 53 officers and men.

In May 1912 they were sold for breaking up.

In 1913 all surviving similar vessels built to the same requirement were reclassified as the A-class torpedo boat destroyers.

== See also ==
- A-class destroyer (1913)

== Bibliography ==
- Chesneau, Roger & Kolesnik, Eugene M., eds. (1979). Conway's All The World's Fighting Ships 1860–1905. London: Conway Maritime Press. ISBN 0-85177-133-5.
- Colledge, J. J.; Warlow, Ben (2006) [1969]. Ships of the Royal Navy: The Complete Record of All Fighting Ships of the Royal Navy from the 15th Century to the Present (3rd Rev ed.). London: Chatham Publishing. ISBN 978-1-86176-281-8. OCLC 67375475.
- Friedman, Norman (2009). British Destroyers: From Earliest Days to the Second World War. Barnsley, UK: Seaforth Publishing. ISBN 978-1-84832-049-9.
- Gardiner, Robert & Gray, Randal, eds. (1985). Conway's All The World's Fighting Ships 1906–1921. London: Conway Maritime Press. ISBN 0-85177-245-5.
- Lyon, David (2001) [1996]. The First Destroyers. London: Caxton Editions. ISBN 1-84067-364-8.
- Manning, T. D. (1961). The British Destroyer. Putnam & Co. OCLC 6470051.
- March, Edgar J. (1966). British Destroyers: A History of Development, 1892–1953; Drawn by Admiralty Permission From Official Records & Returns, Ships' Covers & Building Plans. London: Seeley Service. OCLC 164893555.
