= HMS Charger (1894) =

Charger-class destroyer

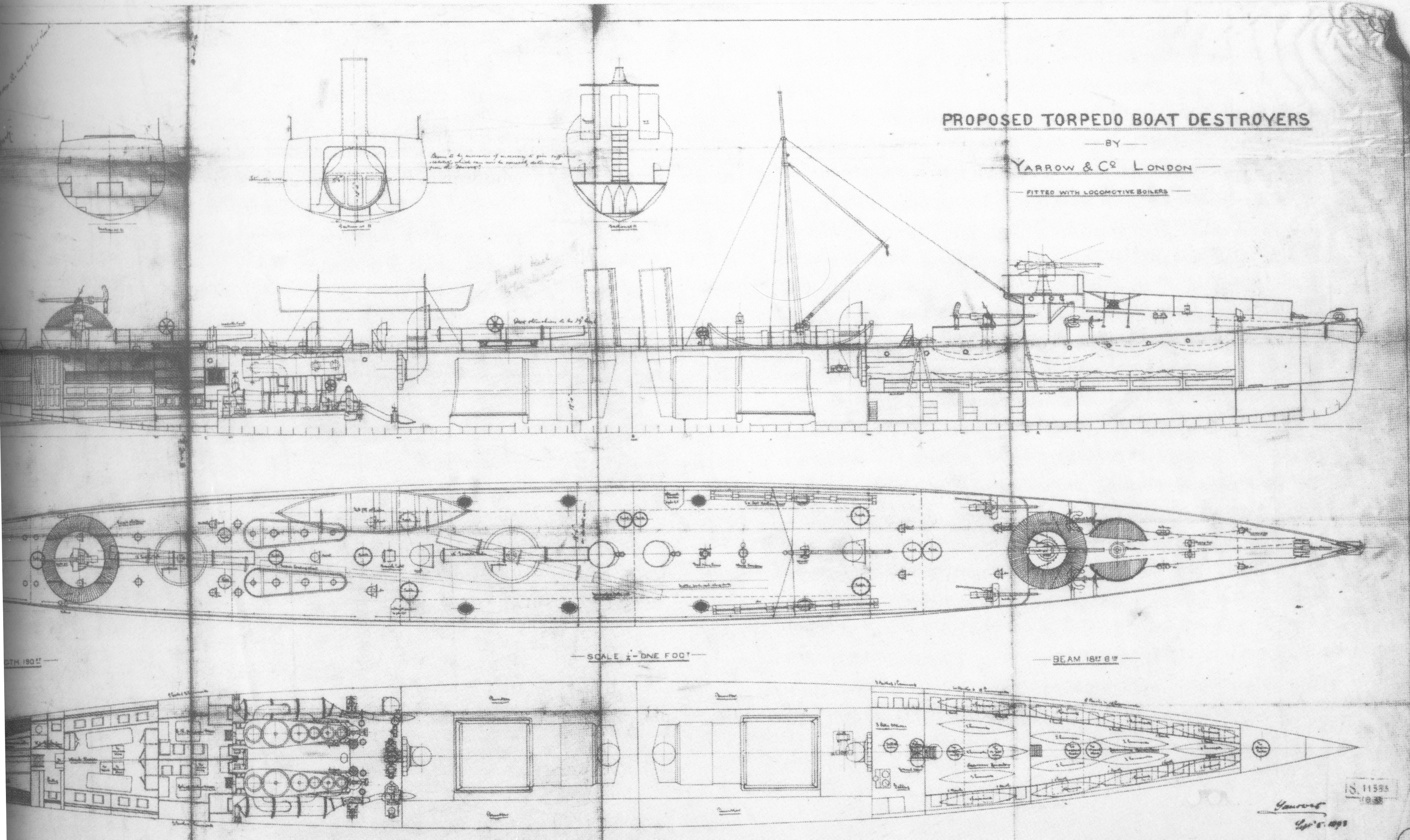
- Plans for the Charger class

History

United Kingdom
- Name: HMS Charger
- Builder: Yarrow Shipbuilders, Poplar, London
- Laid down: November 1893
- Launched: 15 September 1894
- Completed: February 1896
- Fate: Scrapped, 1912

General characteristics
- Class & type: Charger-class destroyer
- Displacement: 255 long tons (259 t)
- Length: 195 ft (59 m)
- Beam: 18.5 ft (5.6 m)
- Draught: 7.25 ft (2.2 m)
- Propulsion: vertical triple-expansion steam engines; Coal-fired Normand boilers; 3,800 hp (2,834 kW)
- Speed: 27 knots (50 km/h; 31 mph)
- Armament: 1 × QF 12-pounder gun; 3 × 18 inch (450 mm) torpedo tubes

HMS Charger was a Charger-class destroyer which served with the Royal Navy. She was launched by Yarrow Shipbuilders at Poplar, London on 15 September 1894, served in home waters and was sold off in 1912.

== Construction and design ==
On 12 October 1893, the British Admiralty placed an order for three torpedo boat destroyers (Charger, Dasher and Hasty) with the shipbuilder Yarrow under the 1893–1894 shipbuilding programme for the Royal Navy as a follow-on to the two prototype destroyers (Havock and Hornet) ordered from Yarrows under the 1892–1893 programme. (Note: Three more destroyers were ordered from Thornycroft on the same date, while a further 30 destroyers were later ordered from other shipbuilders under the same programme.)

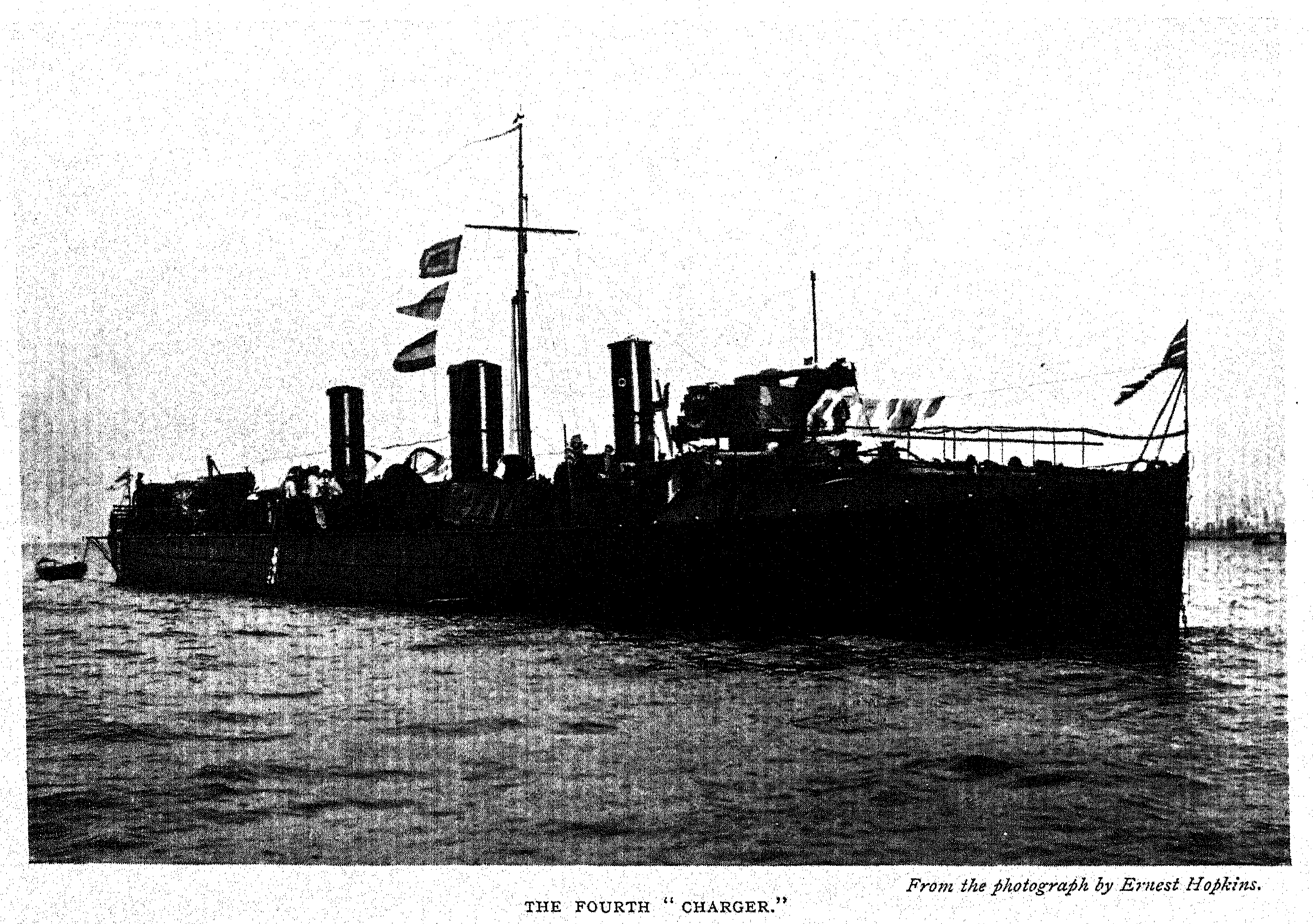
HMS Charger

The Admiralty did not specify a standard design for destroyers, laying down broad requirements, including a trial speed of 27 knots (31 mph; 50 km/h), a "turtleback" (Note: A fore deck with exaggerated camber designed to throw off sea water at high speeds.) forecastle and armament, which was to vary depending on whether the ship was to be used in the torpedo boat or gunboat role. As a torpedo boat, the planned armament was a single QF 12 pounder 12 cwt (3 in (76 mm) calibre) gun on a platform on the ship's conning tower (in practice the platform was also used as the ship's bridge), together with a secondary gun armament of three 6-pounder guns, and two 18 inch (450 mm) torpedo tubes. As a gunboat, one of the torpedo tubes could be removed to accommodate a further two six-pounders.

Yarrow's design was 195 feet 0 inches (59.44 m) long overall and 190 feet 8 inches (58.12 m) between perpendiculars, with a beam of 18 feet 6 inches (5.64 m) and a draught of 11 feet 3 inches (3.43 m). Displacement was 255 long tons (259 t) light and 295 long tons (300 t) full load. Two locomotive boilers fed steam at 180 pounds per square inch (1,200 kPa) to two three-cylinder triple expansion engines. The machinery was rated at 3,000 indicated horsepower (2,200 kW). Two funnels were fitted.

Charger was laid down at Yarrow's Poplar, London shipyard in November 1893 as Yard number 991 and was launched on 15 September 1894. She reached a speed of 27.98 knots (32.20 mph; 51.82 km/h) during sea trials, and was completed in January 1896, at a cost of £41,133. Locomotive boilers were being made obsolete by water-tube boilers by the time of her completion, and she was refitted at Earle's Shipbuilding in 1899–1890 with water-tube boilers changing to a three-funneled configuration.

== Service history ==
In 1896 Charger was in reserve at Portsmouth. In July 1901, she took part in that year's Naval Manoeuvres. Charger was commissioned at Devonport by Lieutenant Robert William Francis Travers on 11 March 1902, for service with the Devonport instructional flotilla. Travers was reassigned to the battleship Nile the following month, when Lieutenant G. H. Brown was appointed in command of Charger. She took part in the fleet review held at Spithead on 16 August 1902 for the coronation of King Edward VII. On 23 September 1903, Charger struck rocks in Loch Nevis on the West coast of Scotland.

In July 1905, Charger, as part of the Chatham Reserve Squadron, took part in fleet exercises in the English Channel. Charger was refitted at Sheerness dockyard in 1908, having her boilers re-tubed, although the refit was interrupted on 27 April when the destroyer Ribble was badly damaged in a collision with the cruiser Attentive, with Charger having to vacate her dock to accommodate Ribble. Charger, now part of the Sixth Destroyer Flotilla, was again refitted at Sheerness in August 1911.

Charger was sold at Chatham to the shipbreaker Ward on 14 May 1912 for scrapping at their Silvertown works, at a price of £1600.

== Bibliography ==
- Brassey, T.A. (1897). The Naval Annual 1897. Portsmouth, UK: J. Griffin and Co.
- Brassey, T.A. (1902). The Naval Annual 1902. Portsmouth, UK: J. Griffin and Co.
- Chesneau, Roger & Kolesnik, Eugene M., eds. (1979). Conway's All The World's Fighting Ships 1860–1905. London: Conway Maritime Press. ISBN 0-85177-133-5.
- Friedman, Norman (2009). British Destroyers: From Earliest Days to the Second World War. Barnsley, UK: Seaforth Publishing. ISBN 978-1-84832-049-9.
- Gardiner, Robert & Gray, Randal, eds. (1985). Conway's All The World's Fighting Ships 1906–1921. London: Conway Maritime Press. ISBN 0-85177-245-5.
- Gardiner, Robert; Lambert, Andrew, eds. (1992). Steam, Steel & Shellfire: The Steam Warship 1815–1905. Conway's History of the Ship. London: Conway Maritime Press. ISBN 0-85177-564-0.
- Lecky, Halton Sterling (1913). The King's Ships: Vol II. London: Horace Muirhead.
- Lyon, David (2001). The First Destroyers. London: Caxton Editions. ISBN 1-84067-3648.
- Manning, T.D. (1961). The British Destroyer. London: Putnam. OCLC 6470051.
