= HMS Contest (1894) =

Banshee-class destroyer

History

United Kingdom
- Name: HMS Contest
- Builder: Laird, Son and Co., Birkenhead
- Launched: 1 December 1894
- Fate: Sold for scrap, 1911

General characteristics
- Class & type: Banshee-class destroyer
- Displacement: 290 long tons (295 t)
- Length: 210 ft (64 m)
- Beam: 19 ft (5.8 m)
- Draught: 7 ft (2.1 m)
- Speed: 27 knots (50 km/h; 31 mph)
- Complement: 53
- Armament: 1 × 12 pounder gun; 2 × torpedo tubes

HMS Contest was one of three Banshee-class destroyers to serve with the Royal Navy.

She was launched on 1 December 1894 at the Laird, Son and Co shipyard, Birkenhead, and served most of her career in home waters.

== Service history ==
Contest served as part of the Medway Instructional Flotilla in 1901. In July 1902 she was part of the escort meeting USS Brooklyn, which brought back to England the remains of Lord Pauncefote, British ambassador to the US who died while in office. Lieutenant Henry Ralph Heathcote was appointed in command on 1 August 1902 (a temporary appointment of Lieutenant L. J. I. Hammond in command appears to have been cancelled), when she was tender to HMS Cambridge, gunnery school ship off Plymouth. Later the same month she took part in the Coronation Review for King Edward VII on 16 August 1902. Following the review, she was paid off into the Fleet Reserve to have new boiler feedwater pumps fitted.

She was sold for scrap on 11 July 1911 for £1760.

== Bibliography ==
- Chesneau, Roger & Kolesnik, Eugene M., eds. (1979). Conway's All The World's Fighting Ships 1860–1905. London: Conway Maritime Press. ISBN 0-85177-133-5.
- Colledge, J. J.; Warlow, Ben (2006) [1969]. Ships of the Royal Navy: The Complete Record of All Fighting Ships of the Royal Navy from the 15th Century to the Present (3rd Rev ed.). London: Chatham Publishing. ISBN 978-1-86176-281-8. OCLC 67375475.
- Friedman, Norman (2009). British Destroyers: From Earliest Days to the Second World War. Barnsley, UK: Seaforth Publishing. ISBN 978-1-84832-049-9.
- Gardiner, Robert & Gray, Randal, eds. (1985). Conway's All The World's Fighting Ships 1906–1921. London: Conway Maritime Press. ISBN 0-85177-245-5.
- Lyon, David (2001) [1996]. The First Destroyers. London: Caxton Editions. ISBN 1-84067-364-8.
- Manning, T. D. (1961). The British Destroyer. Putnam & Co. OCLC 6470051.
- March, Edgar J. (1966). British Destroyers: A History of Development, 1892–1953; Drawn by Admiralty Permission From Official Records & Returns, Ships' Covers & Building Plans. London: Seeley Service. OCLC 164893555.
