= HMS Banshee (1894) =

Banshee-class destroyer

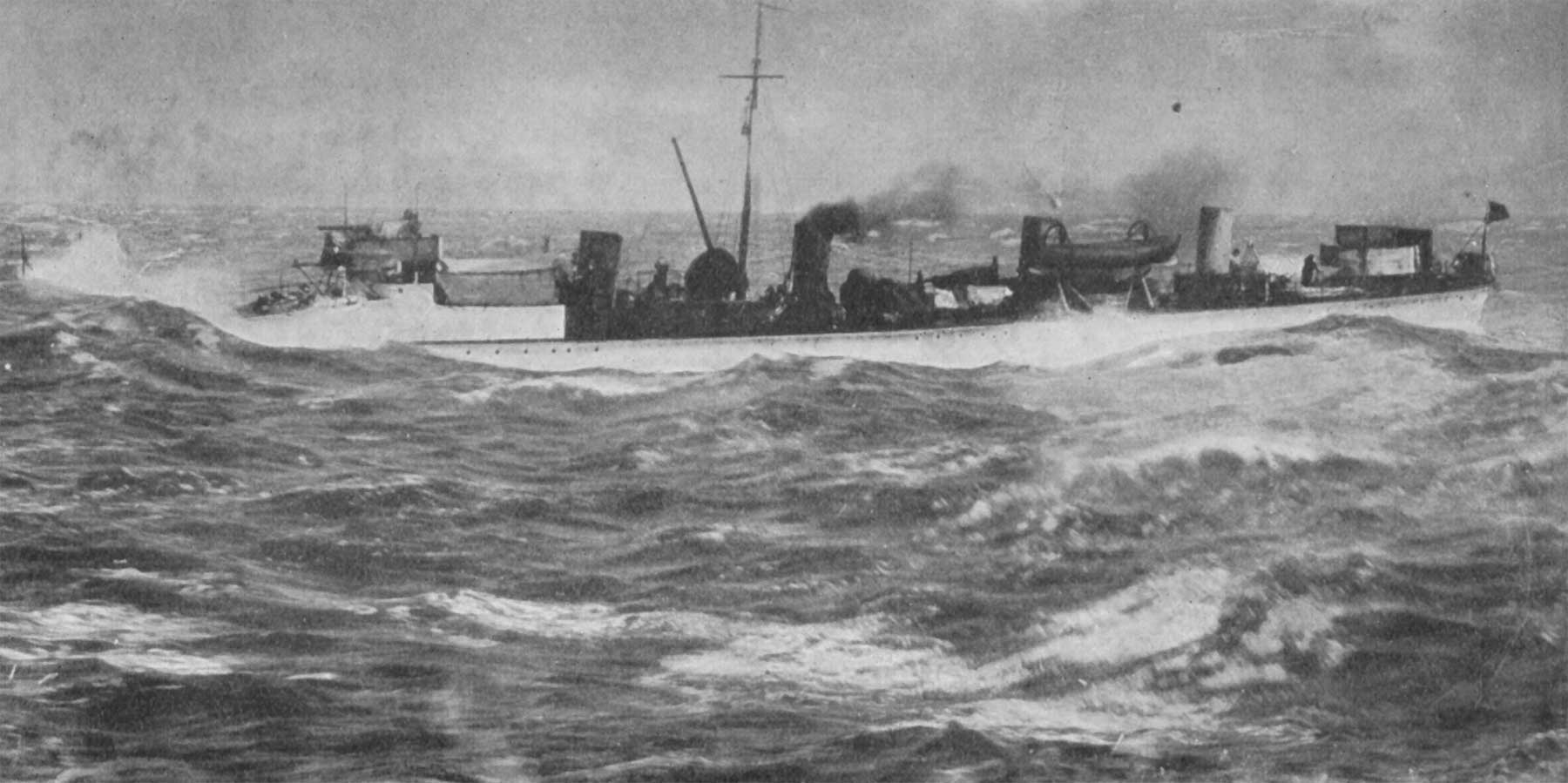
- HMS Banshee

History

United Kingdom
- Name: HMS Banshee
- Builder: Laird, Son and Co., Birkenhead
- Launched: 17 November 1894
- Commissioned: 24 July 1895
- Fate: Sold for scrap, 1912

General characteristics
- Class & type: Banshee-class destroyer
- Displacement: 290 long tons (295 t)
- Length: 210 ft (64 m)
- Beam: 19 ft (5.8 m)
- Draught: 7 ft (2.1 m)
- Speed: 27 knots (50 km/h; 31 mph)
- Complement: 53
- Armament: 1 × 12-pounder gun; 2 × torpedo tubes

HMS Banshee was one of three Banshee-class destroyers which served with the Royal Navy.

She was launched on 17 November 1894 at the Laird, Son and Co shipyard, Birkenhead, and served most of her time in the Mediterranean. Banshee was sold off in 1912.

== Construction and design ==
HMS Banshee was one of three "twenty-seven knotter" torpedo boat destroyers ordered from Laird, Son and Co on 7 February 1894 as part of the Royal Navy's 1893–1894 construction programme. (Note: In total, 36 destroyers were ordered as part of this programme.) The Admiralty laid down broad requirements for the destroyers, including a speed of 27 knots (50 km/h; 31 mph) on sea trials, a "turtleback" (Note: A fore deck with exaggerated camber designed to throw off sea water at high speeds.) forecastle and armament, which was to vary depending on whether the ship was to be used in the torpedo boat or gunboat role. As a torpedo boat, the planned armament was a single QF 12 pounder 12 cwt (3 in (76 mm) calibre) (Note: "Cwt" is the abbreviation for hundredweight, 12cwt referring to the weight of the gun.) gun on a platform on the ship's conning tower (in practice the platform was also used as the ship's bridge), together with a secondary gun armament of three 6-pounder guns, and two 18 inch (450 mm) torpedo tubes. As a gunboat, one of the torpedo tubes could be removed to accommodate a further two six-pounders. (Note: In practice, by 1908, most twenty-seven knotters, including Banshee, carried both the full torpedo and gun armaments at the same time.) Detailed design was left to the builders (although all designs were approved by the Admiralty), resulting in each of the builders producing different designs rather the ships being built to a standard design.

Banshee was 213 feet 0 inches (64.92 m) long overall and 208 feet 0 inches (63.40 m) between perpendiculars, with a beam of 19 feet 3 inches (5.87 m) and a draught of 9 feet 6 inches (2.90 m). Displacement was 290 long tons (290 t) light and 345 long tons (351 t) full load. The ship was powered by two triple expansion steam engines rated at 4,400 indicated horsepower (3,300 kW), fed from four Normand boilers, with the boilers' outtakes ducted together to four funnels. She had a crew of 50 officers and men.

Banshee was laid down at Laird's Birkenhead shipyard on 1 March 1894 as Yard number 598 and was launched on 17 November 1894. Sea trials were successful, with Banshee reaching speeds of 27.97 knots (51.80 km/h; 32.19 mph) over the measured mile and an average speed of 27.6 knots (51.1 km/h; 31.8 mph) during the three-hour continuous steaming trial. She was completed in July 1895.

== Service history ==
On 24 July 1895, Banshee commissioned at Devonport for manoeuvres of the Channel Fleet. In January 1896, Banshee was in commission at Devonport for training purposes. In March 1896, she was docked at Devonport for repair of damage to her hull sustained in severe weather in the Irish Sea. In July 1896, Banshee took part in the Royal Navy's annual fleet exercises. Later that year, she joined the Mediterranean Fleet, arriving at Malta on 16 September. She remained on the Mediterranean station for most of the rest of her service. Lieutenant Alan Cameron Bruce was appointed in command in the Spring of 1902. She visited Lemnos in August 1902, and Argostoli in early October. Lieutenant James Uchtred Farie was appointed in command later that year.

Banshee was sold for scrap to Ward of Briton Ferry on 10 April 1912, for a price of £ 1780.

== Bibliography ==
- Brassey, T. A. (1897). The Naval Annual 1897. Portsmouth, UK: J. Griffin and Co.
- Chesneau, Roger & Kolesnik, Eugene M., eds. (1979). Conway's All The World's Fighting Ships 1860–1905. London: Conway Maritime Press. ISBN 0-85177-133-5.
- Colledge, J. J.; Warlow, Ben (2006) [1969]. Ships of the Royal Navy: The Complete Record of All Fighting Ships of the Royal Navy from the 15th Century to the Present (3rd Rev ed.). London: Chatham Publishing. ISBN 978-1-86176-281-8. OCLC 67375475.
- Friedman, Norman (2009). British Destroyers: From Earliest Days to the Second World War. Barnsley, UK: Seaforth Publishing. ISBN 978-1-84832-049-9.
- Gardiner, Robert & Gray, Randal, eds. (1985). Conway's All The World's Fighting Ships 1906–1921. London: Conway Maritime Press. ISBN 0-85177-245-5.
- Gardiner, Robert; Lambert, Andrew, eds. (1992). Steam, Steel & Shellfire: The Steam Warship 1815–1905. Conway's History of the Ship. London: Conway Maritime Press. ISBN 0-85177-564-0.
- Lecky, Halton Sterling (1913). The King's Ships: Volume I. London: Horace Muirhead.
- Lyon, David (2001) [1996]. The First Destroyers. London: Caxton Editions. ISBN 1-84067-364-8.
- Manning, T. D. (1961). The British Destroyer. Putnam & Co. OCLC 6470051.
- March, Edgar J. (1966). British Destroyers: A History of Development, 1892–1953; Drawn by Admiralty Permission From Official Records & Returns, Ships' Covers & Building Plans. London: Seeley Service. OCLC 164893555.
