= HMS Haughty (1895) =

Hardy-class destroyer

History

United Kingdom
- Name: HMS Haughty
- Ordered: 3 November 1893
- Builder: William Doxford & Sons, Pallion
- Yard number: 225
- Laid down: 28 May 1894
- Launched: 18 September 1895
- Sponsored by: Miss Greta Doxford
- Fate: Sold for scrapping, 10 April 1912

General characteristics
- Class & type: Hardy-class destroyer
- Displacement: 260 long tons (264 t)
- Length: 196 ft (60 m)
- Beam: 19 ft (5.8 m)
- Draught: 7.75 ft (2.36 m)
- Depth: 12 ft 6 in (3.81 m)
- Installed power: 4,000 hp (3,000 kW)
- Propulsion: 2 × Triple expansion steam engines; Yarrow-type water-tube boilers
- Speed: 27 knots (50 km/h; 31 mph)
- Complement: 53
- Armament: 1 × 12-pounder gun; 5 × 6-pounder guns; 2 × torpedo tubes

HMS Haughty was a Hardy-class destroyer which served with the Royal Navy. She was launched by William Doxford & Sons on 18 September 1895, served in home waters, and was sold on 10 April 1912.

== Construction and design ==
HMS Haughty was one of the two destroyers ordered from William Doxford & Sons on 3 November 1893 as part of the Royal Navy's 1893–1894 construction programme.

The Admiralty did not specify a standard design for destroyers, laying down broad requirements, including a trial speed of 27 knots (31 mph; 50 km/h), a "turtleback" forecastle and armament, which was to vary depending on whether the ship was to be used in the torpedo boat or gunboat role. As a torpedo boat, the planned armament was a single QF 12 pounder 12 cwt (3 in (76 mm) calibre) gun on a platform on the ship's conning tower (in practice the platform was also used as the ship's bridge), together with a secondary gun armament of three 6-pounder guns, and two 18 inch (450 mm) torpedo tubes. As a gunboat, one of the torpedo tubes could be removed to accommodate a further two six-pounders.

Doxford's design had a hull of length 200 feet 3 inches (61.04 m) overall and 196 feet (59.74 m) between perpendiculars, with a beam of 19 feet (5.79 m) and a draught of 7 feet 9 inches (2.36 m). Eight Yarrow boilers fed steam at 185 pounds per square inch (1,280 kPa) to triple expansion steam engines rated at 4,200 indicated horsepower (3,100 kW) and driving two propeller shafts. Displacement was 260 long tons (260 t) light and 325 long tons (330 t) deep load. Unusually for the destroyers ordered under the 1893–1894 programme, the Admiralty accepted a guaranteed speed of 26 knots (48 km/h; 30 mph), rather than the more normal 27 knots, possibly owing to Doxford's inexperience in building torpedo-craft. This speed dropped to 22 knots (41 km/h; 25 mph) at deep load. Sufficient coal was carried to give a range of 1,155 nautical miles (2,139 km; 1,329 mi) at 11 knots (20 km/h; 13 mph). Three funnels were fitted. The ship's complement was 50 officers and men.

She was laid down as Yard Number 227 at Doxford's Sunderland shipyard on 28 May 1894, and was launched on 18 September 1895, with Miss Greta Doxford, daughter of William Theodore Doxford, serving as a sponsor. Sea trials were successful, with the ship reaching an average speed of 27.1 knots (50.2 km/h; 31.2 mph), and she was completed in August 1896.

== Service history ==
Haughty and her sister ship was initially considered for overseas service on the Pacific Station, but Janus and Lightning were chosen instead owing to their greater range, and Haughty ended up serving her entire career in home waters. In 1896 Haughty was in reserve at Chatham. Later she was commissioned in the Medway Instructional Flotilla. In January 1900, under the command of Lieutenant and Commander E. Leatham, she had a breakdown in her machinery, and was paid off at Chatham to have defects made good and undergo a refit. In May 1902 she received the officers and men from the destroyer Havock, and was commissioned on 8 May at Chatham by Lieutenant Harry Charles John Roberts West for service with the Medway Instructional Flotilla. She took part in the fleet review held at Spithead on 16 August 1902 for the coronation of King Edward VII, and Lieutenant William Boyle was appointed in command later the same month, on 28 August. She did not rejoin the Medway flotilla until the middle of October.

On 2 July 1908 Haughty was taking part in the annual Naval Manoeuvres when she collided with the destroyer Ranger. While Haughty's bow was only slightly twisted, the damage to Ranger was more severe, with her hull holed.

In 1910 Haughty was a member of the Sixth Destroyer Flotilla as a tender to the shore establishment Vernon.

Haughty was sold for scrap on 10 April 1912.
