= USS Sunfish =

Two ships of the United States Navy have borne the name USS Sunfish, named in honor of the ocean sunfish, Mola mola, a plectognath marine fish, having a deep body truncated behind, and high dorsal and anal fins.

- USS Sunfish (SS-281), was a Gato-class submarine, commissioned in 1942 and struck in 1960. She made eleven war patrols in the Pacific during World War II.
- USS Sunfish (SSN-649), was a Sturgeon-class submarine, commissioned in 1969 and struck in 1997.
