= Charger-class destroyer =

Subclass of the A-class destroyers

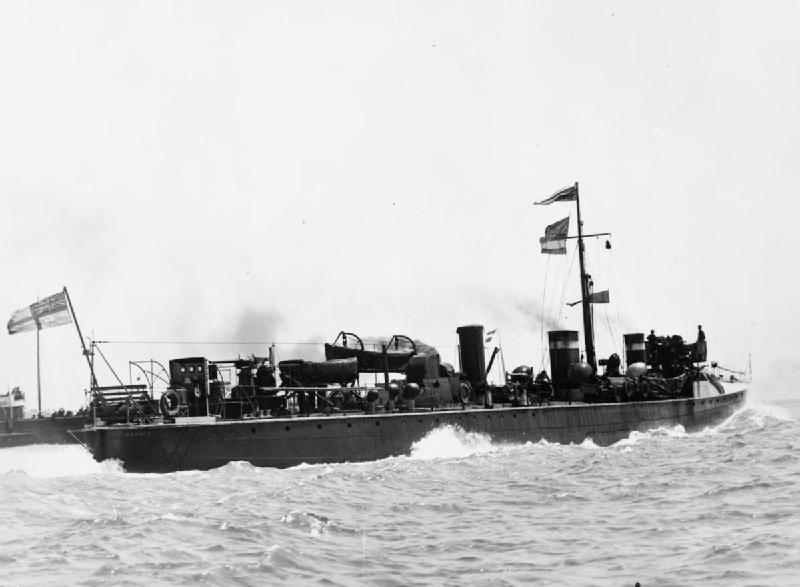
- HMS Dasher

Class overview
- Name: Charger class
- Builders: Yarrow Shipbuilders, Cubitt Town
- Operators: Royal Navy
- Preceded by: Ardent class
- Succeeded by: Hardy class
- Built: 1894–1895
- In commission: 1894–1912
- Completed: 3
- Retired: 3

General characteristics
- Type: Torpedo boat destroyer
- Displacement: 255 long tons (259 t) light; 295 long tons (300 t) full load
- Length: 195 ft (59 m) overall; 190 ft 8 in (58.12 m) between perpendiculars
- Beam: 18.5 ft (5.6 m)
- Draught: 7.25 ft (2.2 m)
- Propulsion: 2 Coal-fired Normand locomotive boilers, replaced 1899-1900 by 4 Thornycroft water-tube boilers.; Vertical triple-expansion steam engines. 2 shafts.; 3,800 hp (2,834 kW)
- Speed: 27 knots (50 km/h; 31 mph)
- Complement: 50 (later raised to 53)
- Armament: 1 × QF 12-pounder gun; 5 × QF 6-pounder guns; 2 × 18 inch (450 mm) torpedo tubes

The three Charger-class destroyers were all ordered by the British Admiralty on 12 October 1893 and on completion in early 1896 they served with the Royal Navy until 1911.

As part of the 1893–1894 Naval Estimates, the British Admiralty placed orders for 36 torpedo-boat destroyers, all to be capable of 27 knots (50 km/h; 31 mph), the "27-knotters", as a follow-on to the six prototype "26-knotters" ordered in the previous 1892–1893 Estimates. As was typical for torpedo craft at the time, the Admiralty left detailed design to the builders, laying down only broad requirements.

Charger, Dasher and Hasty were built by Yarrow Shipbuilders to their builders' design at a contract price of £108,600, or £36,200 each, It was originally intended that they would be armed with one 12-pounder quick-firing gun forward and three 6-pounder guns, mounted on the broadside and aft, and three 18-inch torpedo tubes, one fixed in a bow mount and two on a revolving mount abaft the two funnels; however the fixed bow tube fitted in the preceding '26-knotter' type had subsequently been found to throw up too much spray and was removed, and in October 1893 it was agreed that the bow tube should be omitted, giving "a clean sharp stem with no projections" and instead two extra 6-pounder guns were installed en echelon amidships. These three ships - and the similar three Ardent Class destroyers (ordered from Thornycroft in the same week) - were the first TBDs to omit this fixed bow tube. They carried a complement of 2 officers and 48 ratings (comprising 20 deck department and 28 engine room compartment).

These three ships did not quite meet the speed requirement of 27 knots for which they were designed. In three-hour trials they averaged the following power (ihp) and speed:

Name	Trials ihp	Trials speed (knots)	R.P.M.	Displacement (tons)
Charger	3,177	25.82	364.6	229
Dasher	3,216	26.2	361.5	233
Hasty	2,960	26.084	361.7	233

Their original two locomotive boilers were very troublesome and in their first few years of service the three ships were out of commission most of the time, but these were replaced by four new water-tube boilers (from Thornycroft) in 1899/1900 at Earle's Shipbuilding yard at Kingston upon Hull. This replaced the original closely-spaced twin funnels by three widely spaced funnels (with the middle funnel twice the size of the others, as it served two boilers), like the majority of the other destroyers of the 1893-1894 Programme, and the ships continued to provide good service - all serving in Home waters until 1911. They were then decommissioned and all three were sold in 1912 to be scrapped.

== Vessels in class ==
Name	Builder	Yard Number	Laid down	Launched	Completed	Fate
Charger	Yarrow Shipbuilders	991	November 1893	15 September 1894	January 1896	Sold 14 May 1912
Dasher	Yarrow Shipbuilders	992	December 1893	28 November 1894	March 1896	Sold 14 May 1912
Hasty	Yarrow Shipbuilders	993	December 1893	16 June 1894	May 1896	Sold 9 July 1912

== See also ==
- A-class destroyer (1913)

== Bibliography ==
- Chesneau, Roger & Kolesnik, Eugene M., eds. (1979). Conway's All The World's Fighting Ships 1860–1905. London: Conway Maritime Press. ISBN 0-85177-133-5.
- Colledge, J. J.; Warlow, Ben (2006) [1969]. Ships of the Royal Navy: The Complete Record of All Fighting Ships of the Royal Navy from the 15th Century to the Present (3rd Rev ed.). London: Chatham Publishing. ISBN 978-1-86176-281-8. OCLC 67375475.
- Friedman, Norman (2009). British Destroyers: From Earliest Days to the Second World War. Barnsley, UK: Seaforth Publishing. ISBN 978-1-84832-049-9.
- Gardiner, Robert & Gray, Randal, eds. (1985). Conway's All The World's Fighting Ships 1906–1921. London: Conway Maritime Press. ISBN 0-85177-245-5.
- Lyon, David (2001) [1996]. The First Destroyers. London: Caxton Editions. ISBN 1-84067-364-8.
- Manning, T. D. (1961). The British Destroyer. Putnam & Co. OCLC 6470051.
- March, Edgar J. (1966). British Destroyers: A History of Development, 1892–1953; Drawn by Admiralty Permission From Official Records & Returns, Ships' Covers & Building Plans. London: Seeley Service. OCLC 164893555.
