= HMS Dragon (1894) =

Banshee-class destroyer

History

United Kingdom
- Name: HMS Dragon
- Builder: Laird, Son and Co., Birkenhead
- Launched: 15 December 1894
- Fate: Sold for scrap, 1912

General characteristics
- Class & type: Banshee-class destroyer
- Displacement: 290 long tons (295 t)
- Length: 210 ft (64 m)
- Beam: 19 ft (5.8 m)
- Draught: 7 ft (2.1 m)
- Speed: 27 knots (50 km/h; 31 mph)
- Complement: 53
- Armament: 1 × 12 pounder gun; 2 × torpedo tubes

HMS Dragon was a Banshee-class destroyer of the Royal Navy.

She was launched on 15 December 1894 at the Laird, Son and Co. shipyard, Birkenhead, and served most of her time in the Mediterranean before being sold off in 1912.

== Service history ==
From 1900 she was stationed in the Mediterranean as a tender to the battleship Royal Oak and then to the torpedo-boat depot-ship HMS Orion (renamed Orontes from 1909).

In April 1902 she took part in gunnery and tactical exercises near Arucas, Las Palmas. Lieutenants Arthur George Kennedy Hill and Arthur Kenneth Macrorie were both listed as being in command during the autumn of 1902.

On 9 July 1912 Dragon was sold for a price of £1830.

== Bibliography ==
- Chesneau, Roger & Kolesnik, Eugene M., eds. (1979). Conway's All The World's Fighting Ships 1860–1905. London: Conway Maritime Press. ISBN 0-85177-133-5.
- Colledge, J. J.; Warlow, Ben (2006) [1969]. Ships of the Royal Navy: The Complete Record of All Fighting Ships of the Royal Navy from the 15th Century to the Present (3rd Rev ed.). London: Chatham Publishing. ISBN 978-1-86176-281-8. OCLC 67375475.
- Friedman, Norman (2009). British Destroyers: From Earliest Days to the Second World War. Barnsley, UK: Seaforth Publishing. ISBN 978-1-84832-049-9.
- Gardiner, Robert & Gray, Randal, eds. (1985). Conway's All The World's Fighting Ships 1906–1921. London: Conway Maritime Press. ISBN 0-85177-245-5.
- Lyon, David (2001) [1996]. The First Destroyers. London: Caxton Editions. ISBN 1-84067-364-8.
- Manning, T. D. (1961). The British Destroyer. Putnam & Co. OCLC 6470051.
- March, Edgar J. (1966). British Destroyers: A History of Development, 1892–1953; Drawn by Admiralty Permission From Official Records & Returns, Ships' Covers & Building Plans. London: Seeley Service. OCLC 164893555.
