= HMS Snapper (1895) =

Salmon-class destroyer

History

United Kingdom
- Name: HMS Snapper
- Builder: Earl's Shipbuilding and Engineering Company Limited, Hull, Yorkshire
- Laid down: 2 April 1894
- Launched: 30 January 1895
- Completed: January 1896
- Fate: Scrapped, 1912

General characteristics
- Class & type: Salmon-class destroyer
- Displacement: 305 long tons (310 t)
- Length: 204.75 ft (62.41 m)
- Beam: 19.5 ft (5.9 m)
- Draught: 7.75 ft (2.4 m)
- Propulsion: vertical triple-expansion steam engines; Coal-fired Normand boilers; 3,600 hp (2,685 kW)
- Speed: 27 knots (50 km/h; 31 mph)
- Armament: 1 × QF 12-pounder gun; 3 × 6-pounder guns; 3 × 18 inch (450 mm) torpedo tubes

HMS Snapper was a Salmon-class destroyer which served with the Royal Navy. She was launched in 1895, and served in home waters.

She served as part of the Medway Instructional Flotilla. Lieutenant John Foster Grant-Dalton was appointed in command on 14 February 1902. She docked for repairs to her stem in late May 1902, but was back in the North Sea by early June, and took part in the fleet review held at Spithead on 16 August 1902 for the coronation of King Edward VII. Lieutenant Charles Montagu Foot was appointed in command on 17 October 1902.

She was sold off in 1911.

== Bibliography ==
- Chesneau, Roger & Kolesnik, Eugene M., eds. (1979). Conway's All The World's Fighting Ships 1860–1905. London: Conway Maritime Press. ISBN 0-85177-133-5.
- Colledge, J. J.; Warlow, Ben (2006) [1969]. Ships of the Royal Navy: The Complete Record of All Fighting Ships of the Royal Navy from the 15th Century to the Present (3rd Rev ed.). London: Chatham Publishing. ISBN 978-1-86176-281-8. OCLC 67375475.
- Friedman, Norman (2009). British Destroyers: From Earliest Days to the Second World War. Barnsley, UK: Seaforth Publishing. ISBN 978-1-84832-049-9.
- Gardiner, Robert & Gray, Randal, eds. (1985). Conway's All The World's Fighting Ships 1906–1921. London: Conway Maritime Press. ISBN 0-85177-245-5.
- Lyon, David (2001) [1996]. The First Destroyers. London: Caxton Editions. ISBN 1-84067-364-8.
- Manning, T. D. (1961). The British Destroyer. Putnam & Co. OCLC 6470051.
- March, Edgar J. (1966). British Destroyers: A History of Development, 1892–1953; Drawn by Admiralty Permission From Official Records & Returns, Ships' Covers & Building Plans. London: Seeley Service. OCLC 164893555.
