= Sunfish-class destroyer =

Subclass of the A-class destroyers

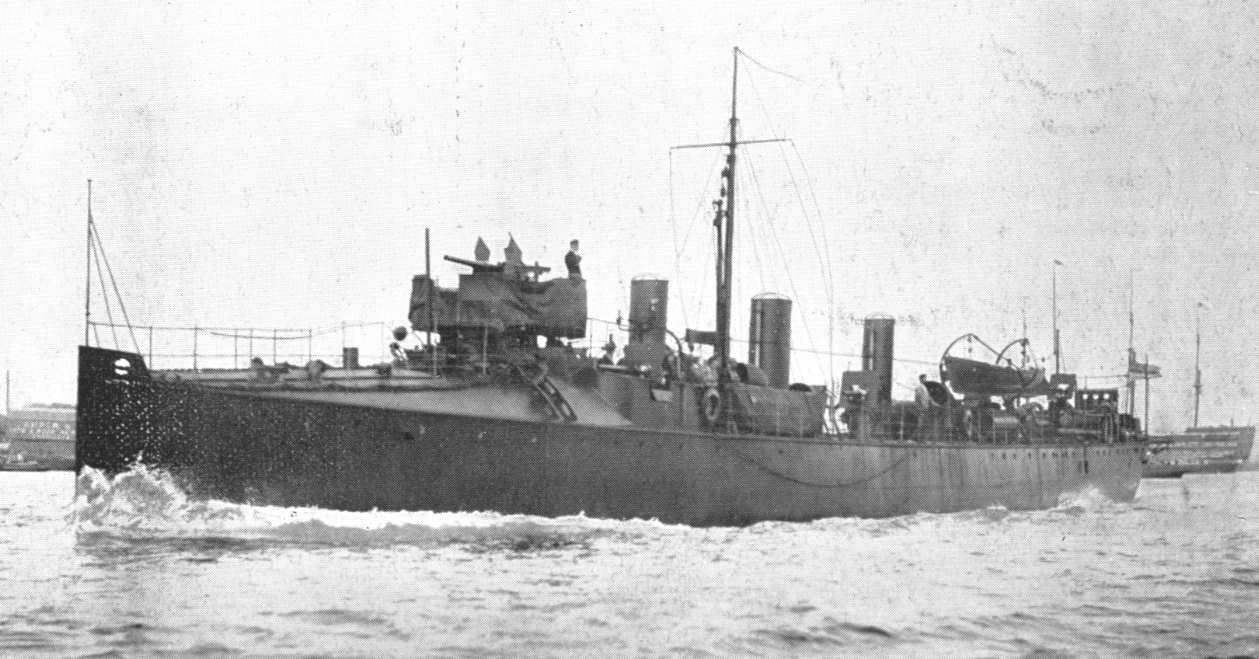
- Ranger

Class overview
- Name: Sunfish class
- Builders: Hawthorn Leslie, Hebburn
- Operators: Royal Navy
- Preceded by: Handy class
- Succeeded by: Rocket class
- Built: 1894–1896
- In commission: 1896–1920
- Completed: 3
- Scrapped: 3

General characteristics
- Type: Torpedo boat destroyer
- Propulsion: 8× Yarrow boilers, 4,000 hp (2,983 kW)
- Speed: 27 knots (50 km/h; 31 mph)
- Complement: 53
- Armament: 1 × 12 pounder gun; 2 × torpedo tubes

The Sunfish-class destroyers, also referred to as Opossum-class destroyers, was a group of three torpedo boat destroyers which served with the Royal Navy from the 1890s to the 1920s. They were all built by the Hebburn-on-Tyne shipyard of Hawthorn Leslie.

== Design ==
Under the 1893–1894 Naval Estimates, the British Admiralty placed orders for 36 torpedo-boat destroyers, all to be capable of 27 knots (50 km/h; 31 mph), the "27-knotters", as a follow-on to the six prototype "26-knotters" ordered in the previous 1892–1893 Estimates. As was typical for torpedo craft at the time, the Admiralty left detailed design to the builders, laying down only broad requirements.

Powered by 8 Yarrow boilers, this was the same 8 boiler configuration originally used on HMS Hornet. The ships produced 4,000 hp (3,000 kW) and could make 27 knots (50 km/h; 31 mph). They were armed with one twelve pounder gun and two torpedo tubes and carried a complement of 53 officers and men.

== History ==
Ordered under the 1893-94 Programme, the contract was placed on 7 February 1894. All three "turtle-back" destroyers were laid down in 1894, launched in 1895 and completed in 1896.

In September 1913 all three, like the other surviving 27-knotter destroyers, were re-classed as A Class destroyers.

They served in Home waters throughout the First World War, and all three were sold for breaking up in 1920.

== Ships in class ==
- HMS Sunfish
- HMS Opossum
- HMS Ranger

== See also ==
- A-class destroyer (1913)

== Bibliography ==
- Chesneau, Roger & Kolesnik, Eugene M., eds. (1979). Conway's All The World's Fighting Ships 1860–1905. London: Conway Maritime Press. ISBN 0-85177-133-5.
- Colledge, J. J.; Warlow, Ben (2006) [1969]. Ships of the Royal Navy: The Complete Record of All Fighting Ships of the Royal Navy from the 15th Century to the Present (3rd Rev ed.). London: Chatham Publishing. ISBN 978-1-86176-281-8. OCLC 67375475.
- Friedman, Norman (2009). British Destroyers: From Earliest Days to the Second World War. Barnsley, UK: Seaforth Publishing. ISBN 978-1-84832-049-9.
- Gardiner, Robert & Gray, Randal, eds. (1985). Conway's All The World's Fighting Ships 1906–1921. London: Conway Maritime Press. ISBN 0-85177-245-5.
- Lyon, David (2001) [1996]. The First Destroyers. London: Caxton Editions. ISBN 1-84067-364-8.
- Manning, T. D. (1961). The British Destroyer. Putnam & Co. OCLC 6470051.
- March, Edgar J. (1966). British Destroyers: A History of Development, 1892–1953; Drawn by Admiralty Permission From Official Records & Returns, Ships' Covers & Building Plans. London: Seeley Service. OCLC 164893555.
