= HMS Hart (1895) =

Handy-class destroyer

History

United Kingdom
- Name: Hart
- Builder: Fairfield Shipbuilding and Engineering Company, Govan
- Laid down: 7 June 1894
- Launched: 27 March 1895
- Completed: January 1896
- Fate: Sold for scrap, 1912

General characteristics
- Class & type: Handy-class destroyer
- Displacement: 275 long tons (279 t)
- Length: 197 ft 3 in (60.1 m) (o/a)
- Beam: 19 ft 5 in (5.9 m)
- Draught: 7 ft 6 in (2.3 m)
- Installed power: 4 water-tube boilers; 4,000 ihp (2,983 kW)
- Propulsion: 2 triple-expansion steam engines
- Speed: 27 knots (50 km/h; 31 mph)
- Range: 1,270 nautical miles (2,350 km; 1,460 mi) at 11 knots (20 km/h; 13 mph)
- Armament: 1 × 12 pdr (3 in (76 mm)) gun; 5 × 6 pdr (2.2 in (57 mm)) guns; 2 × 18 in (450 mm) torpedo tubes

HMS Hart was one of three Handy-class destroyers built for the Royal Navy in the 1890s. Completed in 1895 she spent most of her career on the China Station and was sold in 1912.

== Description ==
Ordered as part of the 1893–1894 Naval Programme, the Hardy-class torpedo boat destroyers were Fairfield Shipbuilding and Engineering Company's first such ships. They displaced 275 long tons (279 t) at normal load and 310 long tons (310 t) at deep load. The ships had an overall length of 197 feet 3 inches (60.1 m), a beam of 19 feet 5 inches (5.9 m) and a draught of 7 feet 6 inches (2.3 m). They were powered by a pair of triple-expansion steam engines, each driving a single propeller shaft using steam provided by four Thornycroft water-tube boilers. The engines developed a total of 4,000 indicated horsepower (3,000 kW) and were intended to give a maximum speed of 27 knots (50 km/h; 31 mph). During her sea trials Hart reached 27.1 knots (50.2 km/h; 31.2 mph) from 4,141 ihp (3,088 kW). The Hardy's carried a maximum of 65 long tons (66 t) of coal that gave them a range of 1,270 nautical miles (2,350 km; 1,460 mi) at 11 knots (20 km/h; 13 mph).

The ships were armed with a single quick-firing (QF) 12-pounder (3 in (76 mm) Mk I gun and five QF 6-pounder (2.2 in (57 mm)) Mk I Hotchkiss guns in single mounts. Their torpedo armament consisted of two rotating torpedo tubes for 18-inch (450 mm) torpedoes, one mount amidships and the other on the stern.

== Construction and career ==
Hart was laid down by Fairfield at its Govan shipyard on 7 June 1894, launched on 27 March 1895 and completed in January 1896.

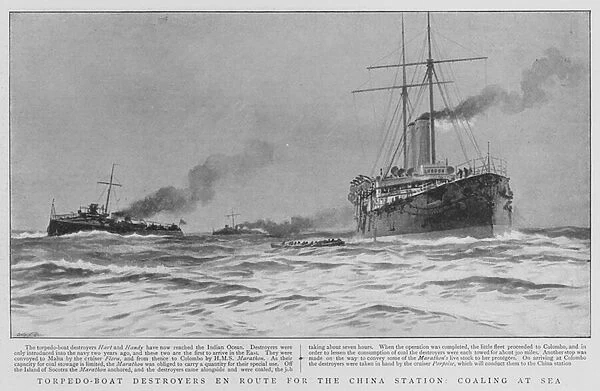
Torpedo-Boat Destroyers Hart and Handy en route for the China Station, coaling at sea by HMS Marathon. The Graphic 1896

The ship was sold for scrap in 1912.

== Bibliography ==
- Chesneau, Roger & Kolesnik, Eugene M, eds. (1979). Conway's All The World's Fighting Ships 1860–1905. London: Conway Maritime Press. ISBN 0-85177-133-5.
- Colledge, J. J.; Warlow, Ben (2006) [1969]. Ships of the Royal Navy: The Complete Record of All Fighting Ships of the Royal Navy from the 15th Century to the Present (3rd Rev ed.). London: Chatham Publishing. ISBN 978-1-86176-281-8. OCLC 67375475.
- Friedman, Norman (2009). British Destroyers: From Earliest Days to the Second World War. Barnsley, UK: Seaforth Publishing. ISBN 978-1-84832-049-9.
- Gardiner, Robert & Gray, Randal, eds. (1985). Conway's All The World's Fighting Ships 1906–1921. London: Conway Maritime Press. ISBN 0-85177-245-5.
- March, Edgar J. (1966). British Destroyers: A History of Development, 1892–1953; Drawn by Admiralty Permission From Official Records & Returns, Ships' Covers & Building Plans. London: Seeley Service. OCLC 164893555.
