= HMS Salmon (1895) =

Salmon-class destroyer

History

United Kingdom
- Name: HMS Salmon
- Builder: Earl's Shipbuilding and Engineering Company Limited, Hull, Yorkshire
- Laid down: 12 March 1894
- Launched: 15 January 1895
- Completed: January 1896
- Fate: Scrapped, 1912

General characteristics
- Class & type: Salmon-class destroyer
- Displacement: 305 long tons (310 t)
- Length: 204.75 ft (62.41 m)
- Beam: 19.5 ft (5.9 m)
- Draught: 7.75 ft (2.4 m)
- Propulsion: vertical triple-expansion steam engines; Coal-fired Normand boilers; 3,600 hp (2,685 kW)
- Speed: 27 knots (50 km/h; 31 mph)
- Armament: 1 × QF 12-pounder gun; 3 × 6-pounder guns; 3 × 18 inch (450 mm) torpedo tubes

HMS Salmon was a Salmon-class destroyer which served with the Royal Navy. She was launched in 1895, served in home waters and was sold off in 1911.

== Operational details ==
In late 1901 Salmon was damaged in an accident, and temporarily repaired at Harwich by shipwrights from Sheerness Dockyard in December 1901. The following month she was paid off at Sheerness, and ordered into dry dock for repairs. She was refitted and had her decks strengthened, staying in the dockyard until December 1902, when she was placed in Fleet Reserve at Chatham.

== Bibliography ==
- Chesneau, Roger & Kolesnik, Eugene M., eds. (1979). Conway's All The World's Fighting Ships 1860–1905. London: Conway Maritime Press. ISBN 0-85177-133-5.
- Colledge, J. J.; Warlow, Ben (2006) [1969]. Ships of the Royal Navy: The Complete Record of All Fighting Ships of the Royal Navy from the 15th Century to the Present (3rd Rev ed.). London: Chatham Publishing. ISBN 978-1-86176-281-8. OCLC 67375475.
- Friedman, Norman (2009). British Destroyers: From Earliest Days to the Second World War. Barnsley, UK: Seaforth Publishing. ISBN 978-1-84832-049-9.
- Gardiner, Robert & Gray, Randal, eds. (1985). Conway's All The World's Fighting Ships 1906–1921. London: Conway Maritime Press. ISBN 0-85177-245-5.
- Lyon, David (2001) [1996]. The First Destroyers. London: Caxton Editions. ISBN 1-84067-364-8.
- Manning, T. D. (1961). The British Destroyer. Putnam & Co. OCLC 6470051.
- March, Edgar J. (1966). British Destroyers: A History of Development, 1892–1953; Drawn by Admiralty Permission From Official Records & Returns, Ships' Covers & Building Plans. London: Seeley Service. OCLC 164893555.
