= HMS Dasher (1894) =

1895 Charger-class destroyer

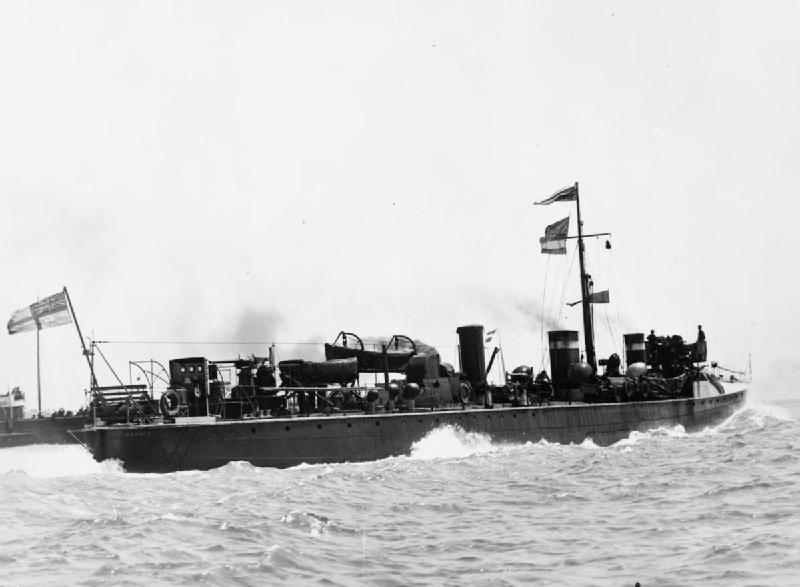

History

United Kingdom
- Name: HMS Dasher
- Builder: Yarrow Shipbuilders, Poplar, London
- Laid down: December 1893
- Launched: 28 November 1894
- Completed: March 1896
- Fate: Sold for Scrapping, 14 May 1912

General characteristics
- Class & type: Charger-class destroyer
- Displacement: 255 long tons (259 t)
- Length: 195 ft (59 m)
- Beam: 18.5 ft (5.6 m)
- Draught: 7.25 ft (2.2 m)
- Propulsion: vertical triple-expansion steam engines; Coal-fired Normand boilers; 3,800 hp (2,834 kW)
- Speed: 27 knots (50 km/h; 31 mph)
- Armament: 1 × QF 12-pounder gun; 3 × 18 inch (450 mm) torpedo tubes

HMS Dasher was a Charger-class destroyer which served with the Royal Navy. She was built by Yarrow Shipbuilders in 1895, served in home waters and was sold in 1911.

== Construction and design ==
On 12 October 1893, the British Admiralty placed an order for three torpedo boat destroyers (Charger, Dasher and Hasty) with the shipbuilder Yarrow under the 1893–1894 shipbuilding programme for the Royal Navy as a follow-on to the two prototype destroyers (Havock and Hornet) ordered from Yarrows under the 1892–1893 programme. (Note: Three more destroyers were ordered from Thornycroft on the same date, while a further 30 destroyers were later ordered from other shipbuilders under the same programme.)

The Admiralty did not specify a standard design for destroyers, laying down broad requirements, including a trial speed of 27 knots (31 mph; 50 km/h), a "turtleback" (Note: A fore deck with exaggerated camber designed to throw off sea water at high speeds.) forecastle and armament, which was to vary depending on whether the ship was to be used in the torpedo boat or gunboat role. As a torpedo boat, the planned armament was a single QF 12 pounder 12 cwt (3 in (76 mm) calibre) gun on a platform on the ship's conning tower (in practice the platform was also used as the ship's bridge), together with a secondary gun armament of three 6-pounder guns, and two 18 inch (450 mm) torpedo tubes. As a gunboat, one of the torpedo tubes could be removed to accommodate a further two six-pounders.

Yarrow's design was 195 feet 0 inches (59.44 m) long overall and 190 feet 8 inches (58.12 m) between perpendiculars, with a beam of 18 feet 6 inches (5.64 m) and a draught of 11 feet 3 inches (3.43 m). Displacement was 255 long tons (259 t) light and 295 long tons (300 t) full load. Two locomotive boilers fed steam at 180 pounds per square inch (1,200 kPa) to two three-cylinder triple expansion engines. The machinery was rated at 3,000 indicated horsepower (2,200 kW). Two funnels were fitted.

Dasher was laid down at Yarrow's Poplar, London shipyard in December 1893 as Yard number 992 and was launched on 28 November 1894. She reached a speed of 26.21 knots (30.16 mph; 48.54 km/h) during sea trials. She was completed in March 1896, at a cost of £40,890. Locomotive boilers were being made obsolete by water-tube boilers by the time of her completion, and she was refitted at Earle's Shipbuilding in 1899–1890 with water-tube boilers changing to a three-funneled configuration.

== Service ==
In March 1901 she was commissioned at Chatham Dockyard to take her place in the Medway Instructional Flotilla. Early in the morning of 15 April 1901 the Chatham Flotilla left Portsmouth for Devonport. In heavy weather Cynthia had to stop to recover her cables, and then while trying to recover her position in front of Dasher, she smashed into the latter's port side creating a hole below waterline and damaging steering gear. Dasher was able to reach Swanage Bay where the destroyer was cleared of water and was then able to proceed to Portsmouth at 8 knots on 17 April. After arrival at Portsmouth, Dasher was ordered back to Chatham where she was docked and put out of commission. Cynthia was badly damaged in the collision too, and had to be put into Kimmeridge for repairs. In July 1901, Dasher took part in that year's Naval Manoeuvres.

Dasher was re-commissioned by Lieutenant Harry Charles John Roberts West on 17 January 1902, still in the Medway flotilla, but two months later was transferred to the Devonport instructional flotilla, under the command of Lieutenant John Gilbert de Odingsells Coke from 18 March 1902. She took part in the fleet review held at Spithead on 16 August 1902 for the coronation of King Edward VII.

On 1 February 1909 Dasher ran aground on South Shoebury Sands, but was able to refloat herself and proceeded into Sheerness under her own power.

Dasher was sold for scrap to King and Sons on 14 May 1912.
