= HMS Vivid (shore establishment 1890) =

HMS Vivid was the Royal Navy designation for the barracks at Devonport in England and for other nominal bases in Cornwall, Ireland and Wales.

HMS Vivid was commissioned in 1890, and operated as a training unit until 1914. The base was renamed HMS Drake in 1934, which today refers to all of Her Majesty's Naval Base Plymouth.

Other, nominal bases, were established for personnel on detached duty and attached to HMS Vivid for accounting purposes. These bases were also named "Vivid".

- Vivid I was the Seamanship, Signalling and Telegraphy School in Devonport.
- Vivid II was the Stokers and Engine Room Artificers School in Devonport
- Vivid III was used for the Royal Naval Division Trawler Section.
- Vivid IV was for personnel at Falmouth (Cornwall) and what was then Queenstown in Ireland from 1922 to 1923.
- Vivid V was used for personnel at Milford Haven (South Wales).

The reason for the ship and the naval establishment having the same name is that prior to 1959, the Naval Discipline Act only applied to Officers and Men of the Royal Navy who were borne or listed in the muster books of one of HM ships of War. Thus all personnel were allocated to a nominal depot ship, even when not actually serving on a proper seagoing warship. This was usually between Drafts or while undergoing Training or promotion/advancement courses. The shore establishment usually took the name of the original ship. Whenever the nominal depot ship changed, then she also took the name of the previous ship.
