= List of ship launches in 1894 =

The list of ship launches in 1894 includes a chronological list of some ships launched in 1894.

Date	Ship	Class / type	Builder	Location	Country	Notes
20 January	Torr Head	Cargo ship	Harland & Wolff	Belfast	United Kingdom	For Ulster Steamship Co.
24 January	Chanzy	Amiral Charner-class cruiser	Ateliers et Chantiers de la Gironde	Lormont	France	For French Navy
3 February	Pontic	Baggage tender	Harland & Wolff	Belfast	United Kingdom	For White Star Line.
3 February	Wittekind	Cargo liner	Blohm & Voss	Hamburg	Germany	For Norddeutscher Lloyd
7 February	Corbridge	Steamship	Blyth Shipbuilding Co. Ltd	Blyth	United Kingdom	For Corbridge Steamship Co. Ltd.
7 February	Decoy	Daring-class destroyer	John I. Thornycroft & Company	Chiswick	United Kingdom	For Royal Navy
10 February	Yorktown	Passenger ship	Delaware River Shipbuilding and Engine Works	Chester, Pennsylvania	United States	For Old Dominion Steamship Company
14 February	Hazard	Dryad-class torpedo gunboat	Pembroke Dockyard	Pembroke	United Kingdom	For Royal Navy
20 February	Duke of York	Passenger ship	William Denny and Brothers	Dumbarton	United Kingdom	For London and North Western Railway
20 February	Harrier	Dryad-class torpedo gunboat	Devonport Dockyard	Devonport	United Kingdom	For Royal Navy
22 February	Ikbal	Cargo ship	Harland & Wolff	Belfast	United Kingdom	For Edward Bates & Son.
February	Peter Jebsen	Collier	John Readhead & Sons	South Shields	United Kingdom	For L F Chapman & Co Ltd.
13 March	Skate	Sturgeon-class destroyer	Vickers	Barrow in Furness	United Kingdom	For Royal Navy
6 April	Halcyon	Dryad-class torpedo gunboat	Devonport Dockyard	Devonport	United Kingdom	For Royal Navy
10 April	Prussia	Passenger ship	Harland & Wolff	Belfast	United Kingdom	For Hamburg America Line.
April	Iona	Humber Keel	Brown & Clapson	Barton-upon-Humber	United Kingdom	For John Dannatt.
8 May	Persia	Ocean liner	Harland & Wolff	Belfast	United Kingdom	For Hamburg America Line.
12 May	Ericsson	Torpedo boat	Iowa Iron Works	Dubuque, Iowa	United States	For United States Navy
17 May	Æger	Rendel gunboat	Karljohansverns Verft	Horten	Norway	For Kongelig Norske Marine
18 May	Mersey	Sailing ship	Charles Connell and Company	Glasgow	United Kingdom	For Nourse Line
2 June	Sissoi Veliky	Pre-dreadnought battleship	New Admiralty Shipyard	Saint Petersburg	Russia	For Imperial Russian Navy
16 June	Hasty	Charger-class destroyer	Yarrow Shipbuilders	Poplar	United Kingdom	For Royal Navy
19 June	Aberdeen	Lighthouse supply and buoy vessel	Fleming & Ferguson	Aberdeen	United Kingdom	For Canadian Government
21 June	Saint Ninian	Cargo ship	D. and W. Henderson and Company,	Glasgow	United Kingdom	For Saint Ninian Steamship Co Ltd
26 June	Guelph	Passenger ship	Harland & Wolff	Belfast	United Kingdom	For Union Steamship Co.
3 July	Hussar	Dryad-class torpedo gunboat	Devonport Dockyard	Devonport	United Kingdom	For Royal Navy
12 July	Carnot	Pre-dreadnought battleship	Arsenal de Toulon	Toulon	France	For Marine Nationale
19 July	Eclipse	Eclipse-class cruiser	Portsmouth Dockyard	Portsmouth	United Kingdom	For Royal Navy
19 July	Norman	Passenger ship	Harland & Wolff	Belfast	United Kingdom	For Union Steamship Co.
21 July	Sturgeon	Sturgeon-class destroyer	Vickers	Barrow in Furness	United Kingdom	For Royal Navy
25 July	Clyde	Sailing ship	Russell & Co Ltd	Port Glasgow	United Kingdom	For Nourse Line
2 August	Bruix	Amiral Charner-class cruiser	Arsenal de Rochefort	Rochefort	France	For French Navy
2 August	Turbinia	Experimental steamship	Brown and Hood	Wallsend on Tyne	United Kingdom	For Parsons Marine Steam Turbine Company
14 August	Blairmore	Cargo ship	Harland & Wolff	Belfast	United Kingdom	For William Johnstone.
14 August	Rocket	Rocket-class destroyer	J & G Thompson	Clydebank	United Kingdom	For Royal Navy
14 August	Shark	Rocket-class destroyer	J & G Thompson	Clydebank	United Kingdom	For Royal Navy
22 August	Admiral Seniavin	Admiral Ushakov-class coastal defense ship	Baltic Words	Saint Petersburg	Russia	For Imperial Russian Navy
28 August	Giralda	Steam yacht	Fairfield Shipbuilding and Engineering Company	Glasgow	United Kingdom	For Hugh McCalmont
August	Britannia	Humber Keel	Brown & Clapson	Barton-upon-Humber	United Kingdom	For George Hill.
15 September	Charger	Charger-class destroyer	Yarrow Shipbuilders	Poplar	United Kingdom	For Royal Navy
17 September	Kirkwall	Steamship	Blyth Shipbuilding Co. Ltd	Blyth	United Kingdom	For Kirkwall Steamship Co. Ltd.
29 September	Lebanon	Collier	William Cramp & Sons	Philadelphia	United States	For Reading Company
8 October	Latouche-Tréville	Amiral Charner-class cruiser	Société des Forges et Chantiers de la Méditerranée	Le Havre	France	For Marine Nationale
15 October	Anglo-American	Humber Keel	George W. Brown & Sons	Hull	United Kingdom	For Anglo-American Oil Co. Ltd.
16 October	Ardent	Ardent-class destroyer	John I. Thornycroft & Company	Chiswick	United Kingdom	For Royal Navy
16 October	Ulstermore	Cargo ship	Harland & Wolff	Belfast	United Kingdom	For William Johnstone.
18 October	Geier	Bussard-class cruiser	Wilhelmshaven Imperial Shipyard	Wilhelmshaven	Germany	For Imperial German Navy
1 November	Petropavlovsk	Petropavlovsk-class battleship	Galerniy Yard	Saint Petersburg	Russia	For Imperial Russian Navy
3 November	Odin	Odin-class coastal defense ship	Kaiserliche Werft	Danzig	Germany	For Kaiserliche Marine
6 November	Poltava	Pre-dreadnought battleship	New Admiralty Shipyard	Saint Petersburg	Russia	For Imperial Russian Navy
10 November	Marino	Cargo ship	Harland & Wolff	Belfast	United Kingdom	For Thomas Dixon & Sons.
10 November	Surly	Rocket-class destroyer	J & G Thompson	Clydebank	United Kingdom	For Royal Navy
12 November	St. Louis	Ocean liner	William Cramp & Sons	Philadelphia	United States	For International Navigation Company
17 November	Banshee	Banshee-class destroyer	Laird, Son and Co Ltd	Birkenhead	United Kingdom	For Royal Navy
28 November	Boxer	Ardent-class destroyer	John I. Thornycroft & Company	Chiswick	United Kingdom	For Royal Navy
29 November	Oropesa	Passenger ship	Harland & Wolff	Belfast	United Kingdom	For Pacific Steam Navigation Company.
1 December	Contest	Banshee-class destroyer	Laird, Son and Co Ltd	Birkenhead	United Kingdom	For Royal Navy
9 December	Lynx	Ferret-class destroyer	Laird, Son and Co Ltd	Birkenhead	United Kingdom	For Royal Navy
13 December	Conflict	Conflict-class destroyer	J. Samuel White	Cowes	United Kingdom	For Royal Navy
13 December	Scotsman	Passenger ship	Harland & Wolff	Belfast	United Kingdom	For Richard Mills & Co.
15 December	Dragon	Banshee-class destroyer	Laird, Son and Co Ltd	Birkenhead	United Kingdom	For Royal Navy
15 December	Orissa	Passenger ship	Harland & Wolff	Belfast	United Kingdom	For Pacific Steam Navigation Company.
19 December	Magnificent	Majestic-class battleship	Chatham Dockyard	Chatham	United Kingdom	For Royal Navy
28 December	Torch	Alert-class sloop	Sheerness Dockyard	Sheerness	United Kingdom	For Royal Navy
Unknown date	City of Everett	Whaleback	Everett Shipyards	Everett, Washington	United States	For Alexander McDougall
Unknown date	Derry	Barge		South Rondout, New York	United States	For Susquehanna Coal Company
Unknown date	Dunhope	Sailing ship	Charles Connell & Co Ltd	Glasgow	United Kingdom	For private owner.
Unknown date	Forth	Sailing ship	Charles Connell & Co Ltd	Glasgow	United Kingdom	For private owner.
Unknown date	Geraldine	Fishing smack	John Newman Atkinson	Dublin	United Kingdom	For private owner.
Unknown date	Gladys	Ketch	David Banks & Co.	Plymouth	United Kingdom	For Thomas Mourant.
Unknown date	Helen Baughman	Schooner	Bowns	Nanticoke, Maryland	United States	For Maryland State Conservation Commission
Unknown date	Katherine K.	Tugboat	M D Battomer	Baltimore	United States	For S H Freas, Miami
Unknown date	LV-58	Lightship	Craig Shipbuilding Company	Long Beach, California	United States	For United States Lighthouse Board
Unknown date	Maggie May	Drifter	Beeching Brothers Ltd.	Great Yarmouth	United Kingdom	For John S. Johnston and others.
Unknown date	Mersey	Sailing ship	Charles Connell & Co Ltd	Glasgow	United Kingdom	For private owner.
Unknown date	Princess May	Ketch	J. Allen & Co.	Poole	United Kingdom	For Frederick Griffin.
Unknown date	Safra El-Bahr	Royal yacht	A. & J. Inglis	Glasgow	United Kingdom	For the Khedive of Egypt
Unknown date	Solveig	Cargo ship	Swan & Hunter	Wallsend	United Kingdom	
Unknown date	Westward Ho	Paddle steamer	Ailsa Shipbuilding Co Ltd.	Troon	United Kingdom	For P. & A. Campbell.
