= List of ship launches in 1895 =

The list of ship launches in 1895 includes a chronological list of some ships launched in 1895.

Date	Ship	Class / type	Builder	Location	Country	Notes
25 January	Carperby	Steamship	R. Ropner & Co	Stockton-on-Tees	United Kingdom	For R. Ropner & Co.
31 January	Majestic	Majestic-class battleship	Portsmouth Dockyard	Portsmouth	United Kingdom	
27 February	Swordfish	Swordfish-class destroyer	Armstrong Mitchell and Co	Elswick	United Kingdom	
27 February	Bruizer	Ardent-class destroyer	Thornycroft	Chiswick	United Kingdom	
12 March	Janus	Janus-class destroyer	Palmers	Jarrow	United Kingdom	
27 March	Hart	Handy-class destroyer	Fairfields	Govan	United Kingdom	
28 March	Fervent	Fervent-class destroyer	Hanna, Donald & Wilson	Paisley	United Kingdom	
3 April	Ägir	Odin-class coastal defense ship	Kaiserliche Werft Kiel	Kiel	Germany	
25 April	Talbot	Eclipse-class cruiser	Devonport Dockyard	Devonport	United Kingdom	
25 April	Phoenix	Phoenix-class sloop	Devonport Dockyard	Devonport	United Kingdom	
8 May	Renown	Pre-dreadnought battleship	Pembroke Dockyard	Pembroke Dock, Pembrokeshire	United Kingdom	
9 May	Duke of Lancaster	Mail steamer	Naval Construction & Armaments Co	Barrow-in-Furness	United Kingdom	
10 May	Buenos Aires	Cruiser	Armstrong Mitchell and Co	Newcastle upon Tyne	Argentina	
25 May	Emily	Sloop	Brown & Clapson	Barton-upon-Humber	United Kingdom	For Benjamin Barraclough & William Barraclough.
27 May	Terrible	Powerful-class cruiser	J & G Thompson	Clydebank	United Kingdom	
5 June	Skinningrove	Steamship	J. L. Thompson & Sons	Sunderland	United Kingdom	For Skinningrove Iron Co. Ltd.
6 June	Avery Hill	Cargo ship	Short Brothers	Sunderland	United Kingdom	For Nitrate Producers' Steamship Company Ltd. - Lawther, Latta & Company
7 June	Spitfire	Swordfish-class destroyer	Armstrong Mitchell and Co	Newcastle upon Tyne	United Kingdom	
22 June	Georgic	Livestock carrier	Harland & Wolff	Belfast	United Kingdom	For White Star Line
6 July	Victorian	Passenger ship	Harland & Wolff	Belfast	United Kingdom	For F. Leyland & Co.
7 July	Victorian	Victorian-class cargo liner	Harland & Wolff	Belfast	United Kingdom	For Leyland Line
24 July	Powerful	Powerful-class cruiser	Vickers Limited	Barrow-in-Furness	United Kingdom	
24 July	Masséna	Pre-dreadnought battleship	Ateliers et Chantiers de la Loire	Saint-Nazaire	France	
25 July	Armenian	Victorian-class cargo liner	Harland & Wolff	Belfast	United Kingdom	For Leyland Line
8 August	American	Passenger/cargo ship	Harland & Wolff	Belfast	United Kingdom	For Leyland Line
22 August	Prince George	Majestic-class battleship	Portsmouth Dockyard	Portsmouth	United Kingdom	
19 September	Pothuau	Cruiser	Forges et Chantiers de la Méditerranée	Le Havre	France	For French Navy
21 September	Cestrian	Passenger ship	Harland & Wolff	Belfast	United Kingdom	For F. Leyland & Co..
23 September	Minerva	Eclipse-class cruiser	Chatham Dockyard	Chatham, Kent	United Kingdom	
4 October	Barlby	Cargo ship	Ropner & Son Ltd	Stockton on Tees	United Kingdom	For R Ropner & Co Ltd
8 October	Sparrowhawk	B-class destroyer	Laird, Son & Company	Birkenhead	United Kingdom	Originally designated Quail-class destroyers
17 October	Charlemagne	Charlemagne-class battleship	Arsenal de Brest	Brest	France	
19 October	Vedamore	Cargo ship	Harland & Wolff	Belfast	United Kingdom	For William Johnstone.
19 October	Victorious	Majestic-class battleship	Chatham Dockyard	Chatham, Kent	United Kingdom	
20 October	La Seine	Torpedo boat tender	Chantiers de la Gironde	Gironde	France	
16 November	Juno	Eclipse-class cruiser	Naval Construction & Armaments Co	Barrow-in-Furness	United Kingdom	
18 November	Jupiter	Majestic-class battleship	J & G Thomson	Clydebank	United Kingdom	
29 November	Hanbury	Steamship	Blyth Shipbuilding Co. Ltd	Blyth	United Kingdom	For E. Stock & Son.
Date unknown	Countess of Morley	Ferry	Allsup & Co. Ltd.	Preston	United Kingdom	For Orston & Turnchapel Steam Boat Co. Ltd.
Date unknown	Dandie Dinmont	Paddle Steamer	A. & J. Inglis Ltd.	Glasgow	United Kingdom	For North British Railway.
Date unknown	Hiawatha	Ferry	Bertram Engine Works	Toronto, Ontario	Canada	
Date unknown	La Gloria	Ferry	Allsup & Co. Ltd.	Preston	United Kingdom	For John Monk.
Date unknown	Malta	Cargo ship	American Ship Building Company	Cleveland, Ohio	United States	For private owner.
Unknown date	Queenborough	Steam drifter	Beeching Brothers Ltd.	Great Yarmouth	United Kingdom	For Horatio Fenner Ltd.
