= HMS Starfish =

Three ships of the Royal Navy have borne the name HMS Starfish, after the Starfish, a marine creature:

- HMS Starfish (1894) was an A-class destroyer of the Sturgeon subgroup. She was launched in 1894 and sold in 1911.
- HMS Starfish (1916) was an R-class destroyer launched in 1916 and sold in 1928.
- HMS Starfish (19S) was an S-class submarine launched in 1933 and lost in 1940.
