= HMS Sturgeon =

Three ships of the Royal Navy have borne the name HMS Sturgeon, after the Sturgeon, a freshwater fish:

- HMS Sturgeon (1894) was an A-class destroyer and the lead ship of the Sturgeon subgroup. It was launched in 1894 and sold in 1910.
- HMS Sturgeon (1917) was an R-class destroyer launched in 1917 and sold in 1926.
- HMS Sturgeon (73S) was an S-class submarine launched in 1932. She was transferred to the Royal Netherlands Navy between 1943 and 1945, when she was renamed Zeehond. She was broken up in 1946.
