= Colin Kenneth MacLean =

British Royal Navy Officer

Vice-Admiral Colin Kenneth MacLean, CB, CVO, DSO (17 September 1876 – 12 September 1935) was a British Royal Navy officer during the First World War.

== Naval career ==
MacLean joined the Royal Navy, and was promoted a Lieutenant in 1898. He was posted to the second-class cruiser HMS Pique on 15 February 1900.

In February 1903 he was appointed in command of the HMS Swordfish, serving in the Medway Instructional Flotilla, followed by short commands of HMS Cheerful from June to August 1903, HMS Spitfire from August to September 1903, HMS Lee from September to November 1903, and HMS Roebuck from November 1903 to March 1904.

As a Captain, he later commanded several ships, including HMS Lightfoot, HMS Spenser, and HMS Centaur, and as Rear-Admiral commanded a Destroyer flotilla. He ended his career as a naval officer in China, and retired as Vice-Admiral in 1932.
