= HMS Shark =

Thirteen ships of the Royal Navy have been named HMS Shark (or HMS Sharke) after the shark:

- HMS Sharke (1691) was an 8-gun brigantine launched in 1691 and sold in 1698.
- HMS Sharke (1699) was a 14-gun sloop launched in 1699 and captured by French forces in 1703.
- HMS Sharke (1711) was a 14-gun sloop launched in 1711, rebuilt in 1722 and sold in 1732.
- HMS Shark (1732) was a 14-gun sloop launched in 1732 and sold in 1755.
- HMS Shark (1776) was a 16-gun sloop purchased on the stocks in 1775 and launched in 1776. She was converted to a fireship and renamed HMS Salamander in 1778, and was sold in 1783. She then became the mercantile Salamander and was seriatem a whaler, convict transport to Australia, whaler, and slaver. She is last listed in Lloyd's Register in 1811.
- HMS Shark (1779) was a 16-gun sloop launched in 1779. She was used as a receiving ship on the Jamaica station from 1803 to 1816 and foundered in Port Royal harbor in 1818; her remains were sold a few months later.
- HMS Shark (1780) was a 28-gun sixth rate bought in 1780 that foundered with the loss of her entire crew during a storm off North America in 1780.
- HMS Shark (1794) was a 4-gun Dutch hoy purchased in 1794 and handed over to French forces in 1795 at La Hogue by her crew during a mutiny.
- HMS Shark (1894) was a Rocket-class destroyer launched in 1894 and broken up in 1911.
- HMS Shark (1912) was an Acasta-class destroyer launched in 1912. She was sunk at the battle of Jutland in 1916.
- HMS Shark (1918) was an S-class destroyer launched in 1918 and scrapped in 1931.
- HMS Shark (54S) was an S-class submarine launched in 1934. She was disabled by an air attack in 1940 and sank the next day.
- HMS Shark (G03), an S-class destroyer launched in 1943. She was transferred to the Royal Norwegian Navy on completion in 1944 and renamed HNoMS Svenner. She was sunk later that year.
