= HMS Surly (1894) =

Rocket-class destroyer

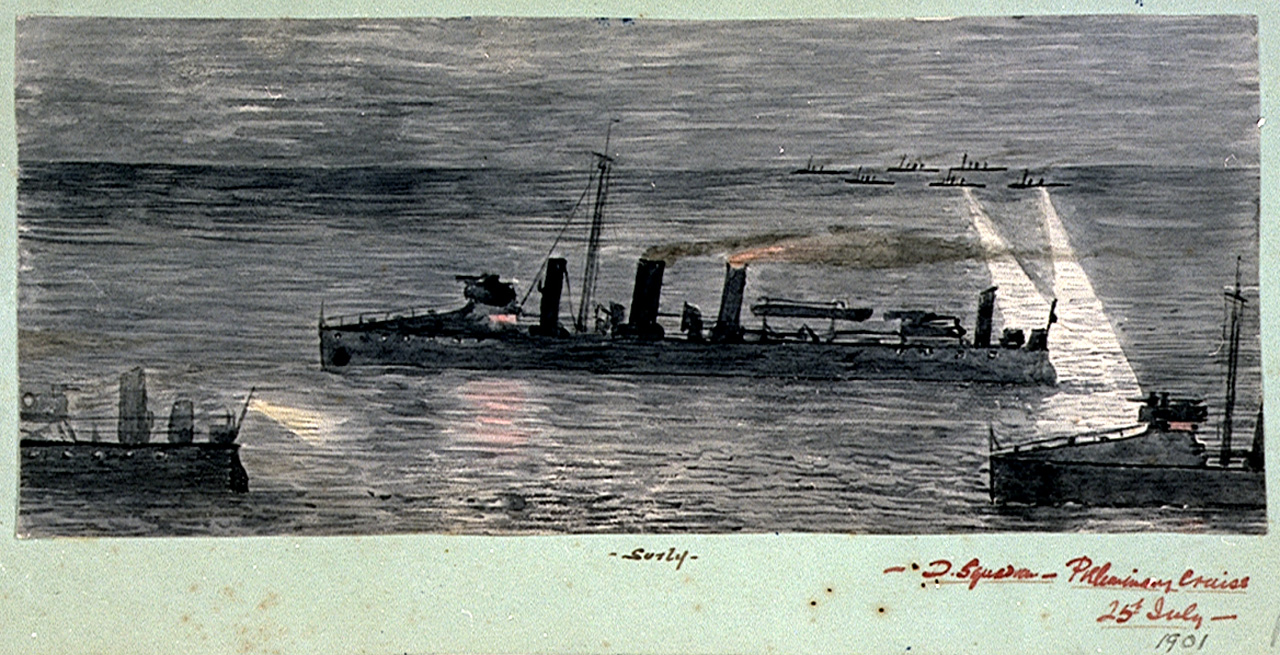
- Drawing of HMS Surly. D Squadron, preliminary cruise 25 July 1901

History

United Kingdom
- Name: HMS Surly
- Laid down: 14 February 1894
- Launched: 10 November 1894
- Fate: Sold, 1920

General characteristics
- Class & type: Rocket-class destroyer
- Displacement: 280 long tons (284 t)
- Length: 200 ft (61 m)
- Propulsion: 4 x Normand boilers, 2 x triple expansion steam engines rated 4,100 hp (3,057 kW)
- Speed: 27 knots (50 km/h; 31 mph)
- Complement: 53
- Armament: 1 × 12 pounder gun; 2 × torpedo tubes

HMS Surly was a Rocket-class destroyer of the Royal Navy. She was launched at Clydebank in 1894, served in home waters and was sold in 1920.

== Design and construction ==
On 3 November 1893 the British Admiralty placed an order with the Glasgow shipbuilder J&G Thomson as part of the 1893–1894 Naval Estimates for three torpedo-boat destroyers, Rocket, Shark and Surly, with Surly expected to be delivered within 16 months. A total of 36 destroyers were ordered from 14 shipbuilders as part of the 1893–1894 Naval Estimates, all of which were required to reach a contract speed of 27 knots (50 km/h; 31 mph). The Admiralty laid down broad requirements for the destroyers, including speed, the use of an arched turtleback (Note: A turtleback is an arched structure over the deck of a ship, normally at the ship's bow, to protect against reach seas.) forecastle and armament, with the detailed design left to the builders, resulting in each of the builders producing different designs.

Surly was 203 feet 9 inches (62.10 m) long overall and 200 feet (60.96 m) between perpendiculars, with a beam of 19 feet 6 inches (5.94 m) and a draught of 6 feet 9 inches (2.06 m). Displacement was 280 long tons (280 t) light and 350 long tons (360 t) full load. Four Normand three-drum water-tube boilers fed steam at 200 pounds per square inch (1,400 kPa) to 2 triple expansion steam engines rated at 4,100 indicated horsepower (3,100 kW). Three funnels were fitted. Armament consisted of a single QF 12 pounder 12 cwt (Note: "Cwt" is the abbreviation for hundredweight, 12cwt referring to the weight of the gun.) gun on a platform on the ship's conning tower (in practice the platform was also used as the ship's bridge) and three 6-pounder guns, with two 18 inch (450 mm) torpedo tubes. One of the torpedo tubes could be removed to accommodate a further two six-pounders, although by 1908 both five 6-pounder guns and both torpedo tubes were generally fitted.

Surly was laid down at Thomson's Clydeside shipyard as yard number 271 on 14 February 1894 and was launched on 10 November 1894. She reached a speed of 28.05 knots (51.95 km/h; 32.28 mph) during sea trials and was commissioned in July 1895.

== Service ==
Surly spent her whole career in British waters, and was based at Portsmouth. She took part in the 1901 British Naval Manoeuvres. Surly was used in trials in the use of oil fuel instead of coal from 1898, which were still ongoing in 1906.

On 30 August 1912 the Admiralty directed all destroyers were to be grouped into classes designated by letters based on contract speed and appearance. After 30 September 1913, as a 27-knotter, Surly was assigned to the A class.

In March 1913, Surly was in commission with a nucleus crew at Portsmouth, as a tender for HMS Fisgard, the Royal Navy's training school for engineers. (Note: Ships with nucleus crews were permanently manned with two-fifths of the ships' normal complement, consisting of key officers and men (including engineering and gunnery specialists), who would become well acquainted with their ships. The ships could be quickly mobilised by regular Navy personnel drawn from shore barracks and training establishments. This mobilisation was frequently practiced.) Surly remained at Portsmouth as a tender to Fisgard in July 1914, on the eve of the outbreak of the First World War.

The Royal Navy mobilised its reserve forces on the eve of the outbreak of the First World War in August 1914, and in January 1915, although still a tender to Fisgard, Surly was also a member of the Portsmouth Local Defence Flotilla.

== Bibliography ==
- Brassey, T.A. (1897). The Naval Annual 1897. Portsmouth, UK: J. Griffin and Co.
- Brassey, T.A. (1902). The Naval Annual 1902. Portsmouth, UK: J. Griffin and Co.
- Chesneau, Roger; Kolesnik, Eugene M, eds. (1979). Conway's All The World's Fighting Ships 1860–1905. London: Conway Maritime Press. ISBN 0-85177-133-5.
- Corbett, Julian S. (1920). Naval Operations: Volume I, To the Battle of the Falklands December 1914. History of the Great War. London: Longmans, Green and Co.
- Colledge, J. J.; Warlow, Ben (2006) [1969]. Ships of the Royal Navy: The Complete Record of All Fighting Ships of the Royal Navy from the 15th Century to the Present (3rd Rev ed.). London: Chatham Publishing. ISBN 978-1-86176-281-8. OCLC 67375475.
- Dittmar, F.J.; Colledge, J.J. (1972). British Warships 1914–1919. Shepperton, UK: Ian Allan. ISBN 0-7110-0380-7.
- Friedman, Norman (2009). British Destroyers: From Earliest Days to the Second World War. Barnsley, UK: Seaforth Publishing. ISBN 978-1-84832-049-9.
- Gardiner, Robert; Gray, Randal, eds. (1985). Conway's All The World's Fighting Ships 1906–1921. London: Conway Maritime Press. ISBN 0-85177-245-5.
- Johnston, Ian (2015). Ships for All Nations: John Brown & Company Clydebank 1847–1971 (2nd ed.). Annapolis, Maryland: Naval Institute Press. ISBN 978-1-59114-584-4.
- Lyon, David (2001). The First Destroyers. London: Caxton Editions. ISBN 1-84067-3648.
- Manning, T.D. (1961). The British Destroyer. Putnam and Co. OCLC 6470051.
- Massie, Robert K. (2007). Dreadnought: Britain, Germany and the Coming of the Great War. London: Vintage Books. ISBN 978-0-099-52402-1.
