= George Gustavus Lennock =

Royal Navy officer and maritime artist

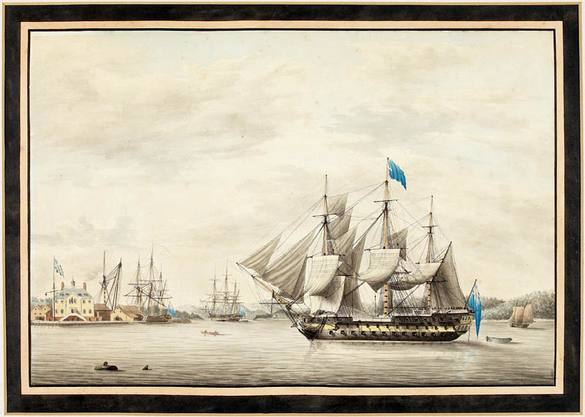
- Lennock's watercolour of HMS Asia at Halifax, c. 1797
- Born: c. 1775
- Died: 12 May 1866 Broomrigg, Dumfriesshire, Scotland
- Allegiance: Kingdom of Great Britain; United Kingdom
- Branch: Royal Navy
- Service years: 1789–1846
- Rank: Admiral on the retired list
- Commands: HMS Mignonne; HMS Ferret; HMS Raven; HMS Esk
- Wars: French Revolutionary Wars; Napoleonic Wars; War of 1812
- Spouse: Anna Walker

George Gustavus Lennock (c. 1775 – 12 May 1866) was a Royal Navy officer and maritime artist whose career ran from the French Revolutionary Wars to the War of 1812. He entered the navy in 1789, probably aged about fourteen, and later became an admiral on the retired list. He commanded the brig-sloop HMS Raven in actions off the Dutch and Frisian coasts in 1811 and 1812, and as a young officer produced signed maritime watercolours, including views of Royal Navy ships and dockyard scenes at Halifax, Nova Scotia.

== Early career ==
Lennock entered the Royal Navy in April 1789 as captain's servant in the frigate HMS Blanche under Robert Murray, and served three years in the West Indies, ending the period as a midshipman. He then served on the home station in HMS Juno under Samuel Hood, before returning to the Caribbean in HMS Veteran and joining the flagship of Sir John Jervis, HMS Boyne.

Promoted to lieutenant in 1795, Lennock joined the sloop HMS Shark at Newfoundland and later served in HMS Assistance, under Henry Mowat, witnessing the capture of the French frigate Élisabeth off Cape Henry in 1796. From 1798 he served at Halifax, Nova Scotia, in HMS Resolution, flagship of Vice-Admiral George Vandeput.

From August 1802 he served in HMS Ambuscade, renamed HMS Seine. While serving in one of Seine's boats off St Jago, he was severely wounded attempting to cut out a privateer, and later received a gratuity from the Patriotic Fund.

In 1805 and 1806 he held acting commands on the Jamaica station, including HMS Shark, HMS Drake and HMS Mignonne, and was confirmed as commander on 6 August 1806. He went on to command HMS Ferret, HMS Musette and HMS Moselle on the same station before returning to England in February 1809.

== Maritime drawings ==
The Art Canada Institute describes many surviving late-18th-century views of Halifax and its harbour as the work of amateurs, often British military officers trained in topographic illustration. At least three signed Lennock watercolours from this period are documented.

H.M.S. Assistance in Halifax Harbour, Nova Scotia, 1796, signed "G.G. Lennock delt" and inscribed "ASSISTANCE", was sold at Christie's in 2007. The H.M.S. Asia and the House of the Commissioner, Royal Naval Dockyards, Halifax, dated c. 1797 and inscribed "G.G.Lennock/Delt.", is held in the Peter Winkworth Collection of Canadiana at Library and Archives Canada, and has appeared in exhibitions at the Confederation Centre Art Gallery, the Owens Art Gallery, The Rooms Provincial Art Gallery and the Canadian War Museum. Two frigates of the Blue Squadron positioning themselves prior to opening fire, signed "G.G. Lennock Delt. 1799" and with provenance from The Armoury of St James's, has been offered at auction by Charles Miller Ltd.

== Command of HMS Raven ==
In October 1809 Lennock was appointed to the 16-gun brig-sloop HMS Raven, attached to the North Sea force. In Raven he took part in two recorded actions against enemy small craft off the Dutch and Frisian coasts.

The first, in August 1811, was a cutting-out operation off the island of Norderney in which Raven served under Captain Charles Sibthorp Hawtayne of HMS Quebec. The official dispatch in The London Gazette described it as a "very spirited and successful Attack" on four enemy gunboats; British casualties were four killed and fourteen wounded.

The second action came on 3 July 1812, when Raven fell in with a detachment of fourteen enemy brigs off Flushing, each armed with three or four long 24-pounders. Lennock's own dispatch, printed by Marshall, reported that Raven overtook seven of the enemy vessels, forced four to anchor under the guns of their batteries, and drove three ashore. O'Byrne wrote that the attack had been made "in face of the enemy's fleet at Flushing, and under the very guns of that enemy's forts", and Edward Pelham Brenton's Naval History of Great Britain recorded the engagement as a chase of the flotilla off the mouth of the Scheldt.

== Command of HMS Esk ==
On 21 January 1814 Lennock was appointed to the 20-gun ship-sloop HMS Esk, in which he was promoted post-captain on 4 June 1814. In Esk he served off the Canary Islands, in the Channel and in South America. O'Byrne records that he captured the American privateer Sine-quâ-non, of seven guns and 81 men, and fought an action off Tenerife with two other American vessels, Grampus and Terpsichore. Esk was paid off in December 1818.

== Retirement and flag rank ==
Lennock accepted retirement on 1 October 1846 after twenty-eight years on half-pay. Successive promotions on the retired list followed: rear-admiral on 4 May 1849, vice-admiral with seniority from 31 January 1856, and admiral from 11 February 1861.

== Family and death ==
Lennock married Anna Walker, eldest daughter of J. Walker of Crawfordtown, Dumfriesshire, in 1829. Their daughter Anne Murray Lennock married Sir George Gustavus Walker KCB, Conservative Member of Parliament for Dumfriesshire; their daughter Ethel Mary Walker became the second wife of the Liberal politician Edward Knatchbull-Hugessen, 1st Baron Brabourne.

Lennock died at Broomrigg, Dumfriesshire, on 12 May 1866. In his will, Lennock made separate bequests to his brother Commander Charles Adam Lennock RN and to Lieutenant-General Sir James Ferguson. Ferguson received a gold snuff box which Lennock described as having been a gift from Gustavus III of Sweden to a Mr Lyall and as having been "willed to me by the late Baroness Nolcken".
