= HMS Avon (1896) =

Destroyer of the Royal Navy

History

United kingdom
- Name: Avon
- Ordered: 1895 – 1896 Naval Estimates
- Builder: Barrow Shipbuilders and Vickers, Sons and Maxim, Barrow-in-Furness
- Laid down: 17 February 1896
- Launched: 10 October 1896
- Commissioned: February 1899
- Out of service: Laid up in reserve 1919
- Fate: 1 July 1920 sold to Castle of Plymouth for breaking

General characteristics
- Class & type: Vickers three-funnel, 30-knot destroyer
- Displacement: 355 long tons (361 t) standard; 400 long tons (406 t) full load; 214 ft 3 in (65.30 m) o/a; 20 ft (6.1 m) Beam; 8 ft 5 in (2.57 m) Draught
- Propulsion: 4 × Thornycroft water tube boiler; 2 × Vertical Triple Expansion (VTE) steam engines driving 2 shafts producing 6,300 shp (4,700 kW)
- Speed: 30 kn (56 km/h)
- Range: 70 tons coal; 1,440 nmi (2,670 km) at 11 kn (20 km/h; 13 mph)
- Complement: 63 officers and men
- Armament: 1 × QF 12-pounder 12 cwt Mark I L/40 naval gun on a P Mark I Low angle mount; 5 × QF 6-pounder 8 cwt naval gun L/40 Naval gun on a Mark I * low angle mount; 2 × single tubes for 18-inch (450mm) torpedoes

HMS Avon was a Vickers three-funnel, 30-knot destroyer ordered by the Royal Navy under the 1895–1896 Naval Estimates. She was the fifth ship to carry this name since it was introduced in 1805 for an 18-gun brig-sloop, sunk in 1847.

== Construction and career ==
She was laid down on 17 February 1896, at the Barrow Shipbuilding Company shipyard at Barrow-in-Furness, and launched on 10 October 1896. During her builder's trials she made her contracted speed requirement. In 1897 during the construction of these ships, the Barrow Shipbuilding Company was purchases by Vickers, Sons and Maxim and renamed as the Naval Construction and Armaments Shipyard. Avon was completed and accepted by the Royal Navy in January 1899. After commissioning, HMS Avon was assigned to the East Coast Flotilla based at Harwich. She was deployed in Home waters for her entire service life.

In early January 1901 she was part of the Medway instructional flotilla, as Lieutenant John Roderick Segrave was appointed in command on 23 January. In early March 1902 she was at Chatham for repairs, after encountering a heavy gale during a cruise, and the following month she was paid off and her crew transferred to the destroyer Swordfish. She subsequently had her boiler retubed at Chatham dockyard.

On 30 August 1912 the Admiralty directed all destroyer classes were to be designated by alpha characters starting with the letter 'A'. Since her design speed was 30 knots (56 km/h; 35 mph) and she had three funnels, she was assigned to the C Class. After 30 September 1913, she was known as a C-class destroyer and had the letter ‘C’ painted on the hull below the bridge area and on either the fore or aft funnel.

=== World War I ===
For the test mobilization in July 1914 she was assigned to the 7th Destroyer Flotilla based at Devonport tendered to Leander, destroyer depot ship to the 7th Flotilla. In September 1914 the 7th was redeployed to the Humber River. Her employment within the Humber Patrol included anti-submarine and counter-mining patrols.

In November 1916 she deployed to the Irish Sea Hunting Flotilla until the cessation of hostilities, providing anti-submarine and counter-smuggling patrols following the Easter Uprising of 1916 in Dublin.

In 1919 she was paid off and laid-up in reserve awaiting disposal. She was sold on 1 July 1920 to Castle of Plymouth for breaking.

== Pennant Numbers ==
| Pennant Number | From | To |
|---|---|---|
| D02 | 6 Dec 1914 | 1 Sep 1915 |
| D45 | 1 Sep 1915 | 1 Jan 1918 |
| D08 | 1 Jan 1918 | 1 Jul 1920 |

== Bibliography ==
- Chesneau, Roger & Kolesnik, Eugene M., eds. (1979). Conway's All The World's Fighting Ships 1860–1905. London: Conway Maritime Press. ISBN 0-85177-133-5.
- Colledge, J. J.; Warlow, Ben (2006) [1969]. Ships of the Royal Navy: The Complete Record of All Fighting Ships of the Royal Navy from the 15th Century to the Present (3rd Rev ed.). London: Chatham Publishing. ISBN 978-1-86176-281-8. OCLC 67375475.
- Dittmar, F. J. & Colledge, J. J. (1972). British Warships 1914–1919. Shepperton, UK: Ian Allan. ISBN 0-7110-0380-7.
- Friedman, Norman (2009). British Destroyers: From Earliest Days to the Second World War. Barnsley, UK: Seaforth Publishing. ISBN 978-1-84832-049-9.
- Gardiner, Robert & Gray, Randal, eds. (1985). Conway's All The World's Fighting Ships 1906–1921. London: Conway Maritime Press. ISBN 0-85177-245-5.
- Lyon, David (2001) [1996]. The First Destroyers. London: Caxton Editions. ISBN 1-84067-3648.
- Manning, T. D. (1961). The British Destroyer. London: Putnam & Co. OCLC 6470051.
- March, Edgar J. (1966). British Destroyers: A History of Development, 1892–1953; Drawn by Admiralty Permission From Official Records & Returns, Ships' Covers & Building Plans. London: Seeley Service. OCLC 164893555.
