= HMS Ferret (1806) =

Royal Navy Cruizer-class brig-sloop

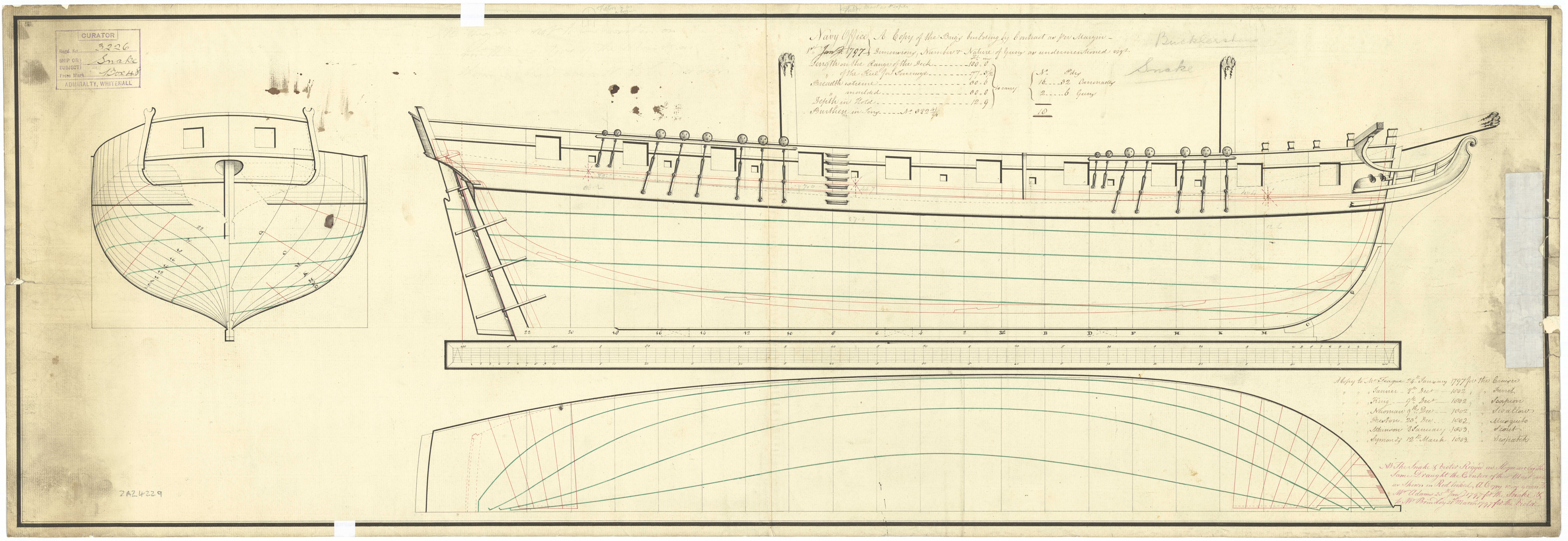
- Ferret

History

United Kingdom
- Name: HMS Ferret
- Ordered: 27 November 1802
- Builder: Benjamin Tanner of Dartmouth
- Launched: 4 January 1806
- Commissioned: March 1806
- Fate: Wrecked January 1813

General characteristics
- Class & type: Cruizer-class brig-sloop
- Tons burthen: 38730/94 (bm)
- Length: 100 ft 2 in (30.5 m) (gundeck); 77 ft 5 1/8 in (23.6 m) (keel)
- Beam: 30 ft 8 in (9.3 m)
- Depth of hold: 12 ft 9 in (3.9 m)
- Sail plan: Brig
- Complement: 121
- Armament: 18 cannons: 16 × 32-pounder carronades + 2 × 6-pounder bow guns

HMS Ferret was a Royal Navy Cruizer-class brig-sloop built by Benjamin Tanner at Dartmouth and launched in 1806, 19 months late. She served on the Jamaica, Halifax, and Leith (North Sea) stations during which time she took three privateers as prizes before she was wrecked in 1813.

== Service ==
She was commissioned in March 1806 under Commander George Cadogan. On 21 June he sailed for the Leeward Islands. In early 1807 Lieutenant John Bowker may have briefly commanded Ferret before being promoted to commander and captain of Epervier.

Commander George Gustavus Lennock then took command of Ferret in Jamaica. On 23 August 1807, Ferret, in company with Lark, captured the French privateer schooner Mosquito, out of Santo Domingo. She had eight guns and a crew of 58 men, and had been cruising for some time without success.

Commander Samuel John Pechell took command of Ferret on 23 March 1808, on the Jamaica station. In April he sailed her for the Halifax station. On 16 June 1808, he received a promotion to post-captain.

From June 1808 she was under Commander Richard Walter Wales. (Note: Later, Wales would be captain of Ferret's sister ship Epervier when she fell victim to Peacock.) On 26 October Ferret chased a French privateer schooner for four hours before Ferret was able to take her. The schooner was named Becune, and she was armed with one long 9-pounder gun amidships and two carronades, and carried a crew of 38 men. She was ten days out of Martinique and had made one capture. (Note: Bécune was a privateer commissioned in February 1807 at Saint-Pierre de la Martinique under Jérôme Boubée. Her first cruise occurred in February–March; a second occurred in July–August. In November, however she captured Elliott and Juno. Bécune was recommissioned at Saint-Martin in early 1808. This cruise ended when Ferret captured her.)

In March 1809, Ferret and Hussar captured three French schooners. They were June Rose (3 March), Rivals (12 March), and Duguay-Trouin (30 March). Duguay Trouin was a letter of marque schooner. She was commissioned in April in the Royal Navy to carry eight guns. She then served in Sir John Borlase Warren's squadron as HMS Duguay-Trouin.

Between November 1811 and February 1812 Ferret underwent repairs at Portsmouth, with Commander Francis Alexander Halliday assuming command in December 1811.

== Fate ==
On 6 January 1813 Ferret left Leith and sailed for Portsmouth. The next evening she grounded and bilged near Newbiggin-by-the-Sea (Northumberland), due to the inattention and ignorance of her pilot. The pilot, Robert Muckle, was barred from ever serving as a pilot again and was sentenced to three months in the Marshalsea prison. The court martial reprimanded the Master, Charles Lupton, for failing to keep track of her position and sentenced him to the loss of one year's seniority.

Her crew was saved and ten days later she was abandoned as a wreck. One boat crew from Ferret took advantage of the opportunity to desert. A press gang picked up three of the deserters, who received sentences of 100 lashes on their bare backs with a cat o' nine tails.
