= HMS Boxer (1894) =

Ardent-class destroyer

Coordinates: 50°36′08″N 01°06′02″W

History

United Kingdom
- Name: HMS Boxer
- Builder: Thornycroft, Chiswick
- Laid down: 1894
- Launched: 28 November 1894
- Christened: Miss Joan Thornycroft
- Completed: June 1895
- Fate: Sunk after collision, 8 February 1918

General characteristics
- Class & type: Ardent-class destroyer
- Displacement: 265 long tons (269 t)
- Length: 200 ft (61 m)
- Propulsion: Triple expansion steam engines; Coal-fired water-tube boilers
- Speed: 27 knots (50 km/h; 31 mph)
- Complement: 53
- Armament: 1 × 12-pounder gun; 5 × 6-pounder guns; 2 × 18 inch (450 mm) torpedo tubes

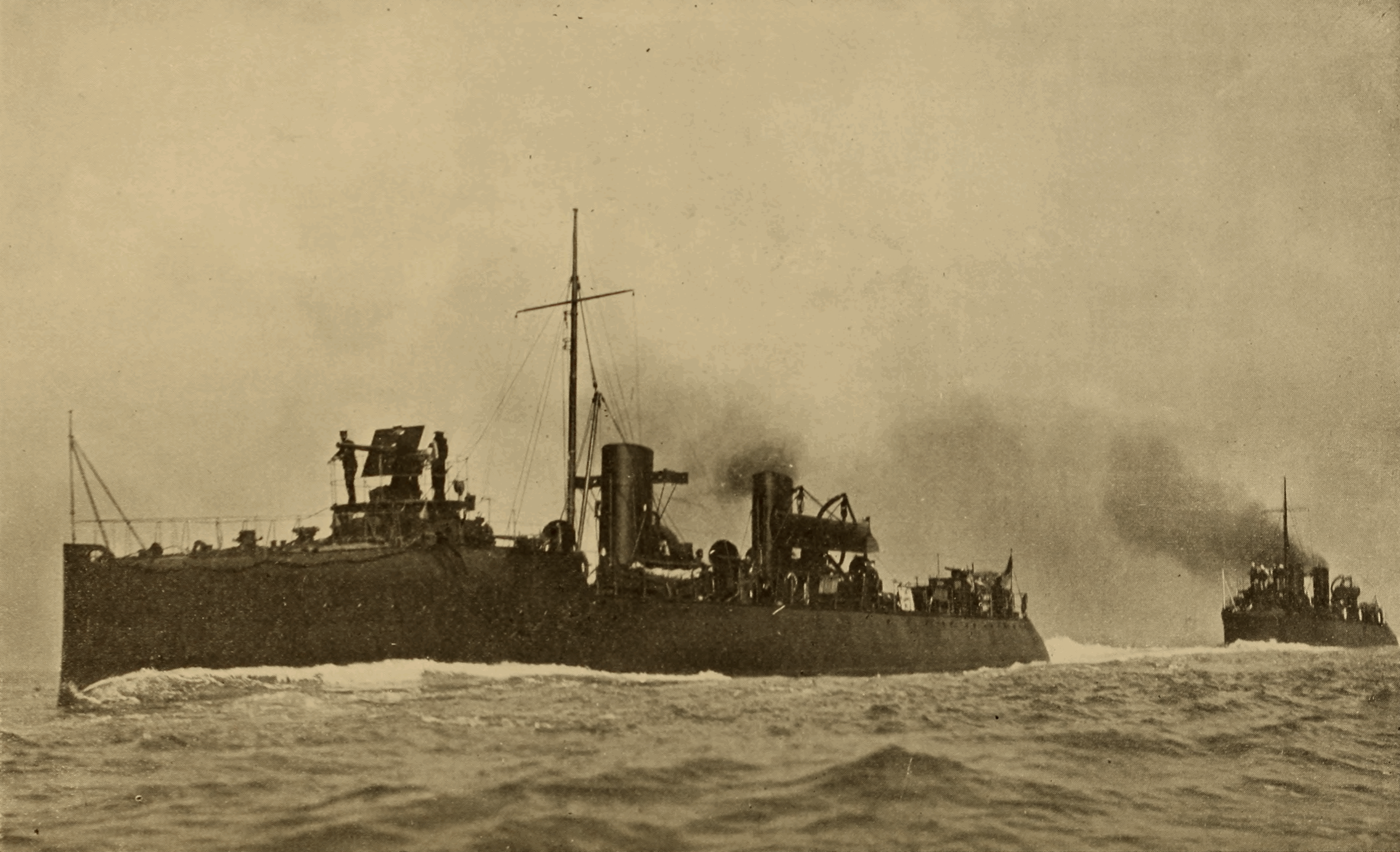
HMS Boxer in 1896

HMS Boxer was an Ardent-class destroyer which served with the Royal Navy, launched on 28 November 1894. She spent several years operating with the Mediterranean Fleet and remained active during the First World War. She was sunk in a collision on 8 February 1918.

== Construction and design ==
On 12 October 1893, the British Admiralty placed an order for three torpedo boat destroyers (Ardent, Boxer and Bruizer) with the shipbuilder Thornycroft under the 1893–1894 shipbuilding programme for the Royal Navy as a follow-on to the two prototype destroyers (Daring and Decoy) ordered from Thornycroft under the 1892–1893 programme. (Note: Three more destroyers were ordered from Yarrow on the same date, while a further 30 destroyers were later ordered from other shipbuilders under the same programme.)

The Admiralty did not specify a standard design for destroyers, laying down broad requirements, including a trial speed of 27 knots (31 mph; 50 km/h), a "turtleback" forecastle and armament, which was to vary depending on whether the ship was to be used in the torpedo boat or gunboat role. As a torpedo boat, the planned armament was a single QF 12 pounder 12 cwt (3 in (76 mm) calibre) gun on a platform on the ship's conning tower (in practice the platform was also used as the ship's bridge), together with a secondary gun armament of three 6-pounder guns, and two 18 inch (450 mm) torpedo tubes. As a gunboat, one of the torpedo tubes could be removed to accommodate a further two six-pounders.

Thornycroft's design (known as the Ardent-class) was 201 feet 8 inches (61.47 m) long overall and 201 feet 6 inches (61.42 m) between perpendiculars, with a beam of 19 feet (5.79 m) and a draught of 7 feet 3 1/4 inches (2.22 m). Displacement was 245 long tons (249 t) light and 301 long tons (306 t) full load. Three Thornycroft water-tube boilers fed steam to 2 four-cylinder triple-expansion steam engines rated at 4,200 indicated horsepower (3,100 kW). Two funnels were fitted. The ship's complement was 45 officers and men.

Boxer was laid down at Thornycroft's Chiswick shipyard, as Yard number 298, in February 1894. The ship was launched on 28 November 1894, with the naming ceremony performed by Miss Joan Thornycroft, daughter of the artist Hamo Thornycroft and niece of the yards founder John Isaac Thornycroft. Boxer underwent sea trials on 25 January 1895, reaching a speed of 29.076 knots (53.849 km/h; 33.460 mph) over the measured mile and 29.175 knots (54.032 km/h; 33.574 mph) over a three-hour run. She was completed in June 1895.

== Service history ==
In May 1896 Boxer joined the Mediterranean Squadron, taking part in trials to determine the optimum colour scheme for torpedo craft in order to reduce the chance of being spotted in night attacks. She remained part of the Mediterranean Squadron in 1901. From 1 January 1902 she was commanded by Lieutenant Bertram Owen Frederick Phibbs. She underwent repairs to re-tube her boilers in 1902, following which Lieutenant Phibbs was back in command when she visited Lemnos in August.

Boxer moved back to Home waters in 1911, joining the 6th Destroyer Flotilla, a patrol flotilla equipped with older destroyers. On 30 August 1912 the Admiralty directed all destroyers were to be grouped into classes designated by letters based on contract speed and appearance. After 30 September 1913, as a 27-knotter, Boxer was assigned to the A class. In March 1913 Boxer was a tender to the training establishment Excellent, being listed as in commission, but with a nucleus crew.

By June 1915, the First World War had brought a return to active service, with Boxer forming part of the Portsmouth Local Defence Flotilla. Boxer collided with the merchant ship SS St Patrick in the English Channel in bad weather on 8 February 1918, sinking as a result, with the loss of one crewman.
