= HMS Swordfish (1895) =

Swordfish-class destroyer

History

United Kingdom
- Name: HMS Swordfish
- Ordered: 8 December 1893
- Builder: Armstrong Mitchell & Co., Elswick, Tyne and Wear
- Laid down: 4 June 1894
- Launched: 27 February 1895
- Commissioned: December 1896
- Fate: Sold, 1910

General characteristics
- Class & type: Swordfish-class destroyer
- Displacement: 320 long tons (330 t) light; 355 long tons (361 t) deep load
- Length: 200 ft 0 in (60.96 m) pp; 204 ft 3 in (62.26 m) oa
- Beam: 19 ft 0 in (5.79 m)
- Draught: 7 ft 9 in (2.36 m)
- Installed power: 4,500 ihp (3,400 kW)
- Propulsion: 8 Yarrow water-tube boilers; 4-cylinder triple-expansion steam engines
- Speed: 27 knots (50 km/h; 31 mph)
- Armament: 1 × 12 pounder gun; 3 × 6 pdr guns; 2 × 18 inch (450 mm) torpedo tubes

HMS Swordfish was one of two Swordfish-class destroyers which served with the Royal Navy. She was launched on 27 February 1895 by Armstrong Mitchell and Co at Elswick and sold off in 1910.

== Construction ==
HMS Swordfish was ordered on 8 December 1893, the first of two "Twenty-Seven Knotter" destroyers ordered from Armstrong Mitchell and Co as part of the 1893–1894 construction programme for the Royal Navy, with in total, 36 destroyers being ordered from various shipbuilders for this programme.

Swordfish was laid down at Armstrong's, Elswick, Newcastle-on-Tyne shipyard on 4 June 1894. Construction was delayed by industrial action and was not launched until 27 February 1895. (Note: Sources differ as to the launching date. Chesneau and Kolesnick and Friedman state Swordfish was launched on 27 March 1894, while Lyon says 7 June 1894, the date given for the launch of Swordfish's sister ship Spitfire in other sources.) Sea trials began in March, but excessive vibration caused one of the ship's propeller shafts to be bent. A further attempt at trials in July suffered the same problem, and re-balancing of the ship's machinery was required to resolve the vibration problems. When trials were again attempted, fouling of the ship's hull resulted in the contract speed of 27 knots not being reached, although, eventually, Swordfish managed to reach an average speed of 27.117 kn (31.206 mph; 50.221 km/h) during her official three-hour trial, when her engines generated 4,750 ihp (3,540 kW). Swordfish was not finally accepted until December 1896, 21 months after the contracted date of 31 March 1895.

The two Armstrong-built Twenty-seven knotters were not popular in service, with Armstrongs not being invited to tender for the Thirty-knot destroyers required in the next few shipbuilding programmes. (Note: Armstrongs built a 30-knotter destroyer in 1898–1899 as a stock vessel (i.e. without an order), which was sold to the Chilean Navy and named Capitan Thompson in 1902. The turbine-powered destroyer Cobra, built as a stock vessel in 1898–1899, was sold to the Royal Navy in 1900, but Cobra sank while being delivered.)

== Operational history ==
Swordfish was commissioned on 7 March 1900 as tender to HMS Wildfire, flagship at Sheerness. She was based at Chatham in 1901, while also serving at Sheerness and Portsmouth. In April 1902 she had finished a refit at Sheerness, and the following month she was commissioned at Chatham by Lieutenant Julian Walter Elmslie Townsend and the crew of the destroyer Avon, taking that ship's place in the Medway Instructional Flotilla. She took part in the fleet review held at Spithead on 16 August 1902 for the coronation of King Edward VII, and was back with the flotilla later the same month. Lieutenant Colin Kenneth MacLean was appointed in command in February 1903, serving to June 1903.

While most of the 27-knotters mounted their full armament of 1 × 12 pounder (76 mm) gun, 5 × 6-pounder guns and two 18-in torpedo tubes, Swordfish, owing to concerns about stability, tended to only carry a single torpedo tube. By 1905, it was stated by the Rear Admiral (Destroyers), that Swordfish was one of a number of destroyers that were "..all worn out" and that "every shilling spent on these old 27-knotters is a waste of money". The ship's speed dropped during service, with maximum speed falling to 18 1/2 knots (21.3 mph; 34.3 km/h) by 1909.

Swordfish was sold for scrap to John Cashmore Ltd of Newport, Wales on 11 October 1910 for £1510.

== Bibliography ==
- Brooke, Peter (1999). Warships for Export: Armstrong Warships 1867–1927. Gravesend, UK: World Ship Society. ISBN 0-905617-89-4.
- Chesneau, Roger & Kolesnik, Eugene M., eds. (1979). Conway's All The World's Fighting Ships 1860–1905. London: Conway Maritime Press. ISBN 0-85177-133-5.
- Colledge, J. J.; Warlow, Ben (2006) [1969]. Ships of the Royal Navy: The Complete Record of All Fighting Ships of the Royal Navy from the 15th Century to the Present (3rd Rev ed.). London: Chatham Publishing. ISBN 978-1-86176-281-8. OCLC 67375475.
- Friedman, Norman (2009). British Destroyers: From Earliest Days to the Second World War. Barnsley, UK: Seaforth Publishing. ISBN 978-1-84832-049-9.
- Gardiner, Robert & Gray, Randal, eds. (1985). Conway's All The World's Fighting Ships 1906–1921. London: Conway Maritime Press. ISBN 0-85177-245-5.
- "H.M.S.S Swordfish and Spitfire" (PDF). The Engineer. Vol. 83. 23 April 1897. p. 422.
- Lyon, David (2001) [1996]. The First Destroyers. London: Caxton Editions. ISBN 1-84067-3648.
- Manning, Captain T.D. (1979) [1961]. The British Destroyer. Godfrey Cave Associates. ISBN 0-906223-13-X.
- March, Edgar J. (1966). British Destroyers: A History of Development, 1892–1953; Drawn by Admiralty Permission From Official Records & Returns, Ships' Covers & Building Plans. London: Seeley Service. OCLC 164893555.
