= HMS Bruizer (1895) =

Ardent-class destroyer

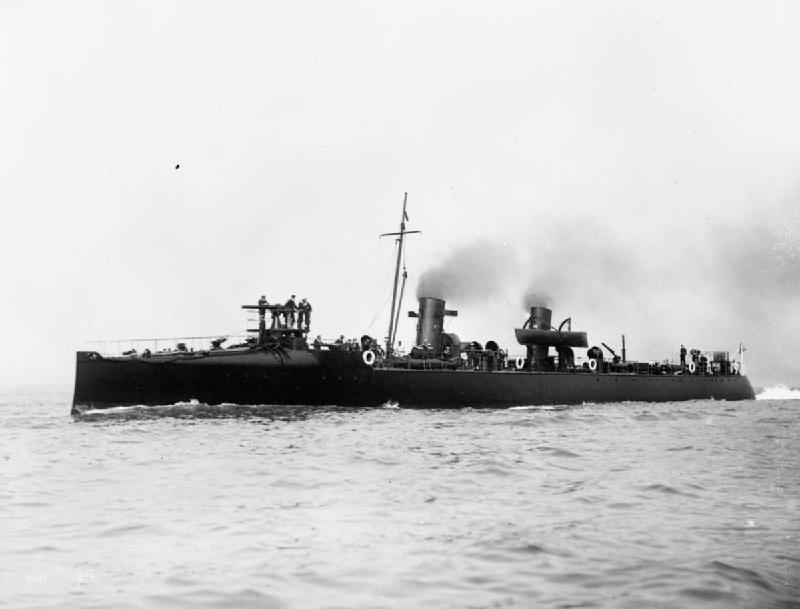
- HMS Bruizer

History

United Kingdom
- Name: HMS Bruizer
- Ordered: 12 October 1893
- Builder: Thornycroft, Chiswick
- Cost: £39,406
- Yard number: 299
- Laid down: April 1894
- Launched: 27 February 1895
- Christened: Miss Kathleen Barnaby
- Completed: June 1895
- Commissioned: 12 December 1895
- Decommissioned: December 1913
- Fate: Sold for scrapping, 26 May 1914

General characteristics
- Class & type: Ardent-class destroyer
- Displacement: 245 long tons (249 t) (light); 301 long tons (306 t) (full load)
- Length: 201 ft 8 in (61.47 m)
- Propulsion: Triple expansion steam engines; Coal-fired water-tube boilers
- Speed: 27 knots (50 km/h; 31 mph)
- Complement: 53
- Armament: 1 × 12-pounder gun; 5 × 6-pounder guns; 2 × 18 in (450 mm) torpedo tubes

HMS Bruizer (Note: Also known as HMS Bruiser.) was an Ardent-class destroyer which served with the Royal Navy. She was launched on 27 February 1895 by John Thornycroft at Chiswick, and was sold on 26 May 1914.

== Construction and design ==
On 12 October 1893, the British Admiralty placed an order for three torpedo boat destroyers (Ardent, Boxer and Bruizer) with the shipbuilder Thornycroft under the 1893–1894 shipbuilding programme for the Royal Navy as a follow-on to the two prototype destroyers (Daring and Decoy) ordered from Thornycroft under the 1892–1893 programme. (Note: Three more destroyers were ordered from Yarrow on the same date, while a further 30 destroyers were later ordered from other shipbuilders under the same programme.)

The Admiralty did not specify a standard design for destroyers, laying down broad requirements, including a trial speed of 27 knots (31 mph; 50 km/h), a "turtleback" forecastle and armament, which was to vary depending on whether the ship was to be used in the torpedo boat or gunboat role. As a torpedo boat, the planned armament was a single QF 12 pounder 12 cwt (3 in (76 mm) calibre) gun on a platform on the ship's conning tower (in practice the platform was also used as the ship's bridge), together with a secondary gun armament of three 6-pounder guns, and two 18 in (450 mm) torpedo tubes. As a gunboat, one of the torpedo tubes could be removed to accommodate a further two six-pounders.

Thornycroft's design (known as the Ardent-class) was 201 feet 8 inches (61.47 m) long overall and 201 feet 6 inches (61.42 m) between perpendiculars, with a beam of 19 feet (5.79 m) and a draught of 7 feet 3 1/4 inches (2.22 m). Displacement was 245 long tons (249 t) light and 301 long tons (306 t) full load. Three Thornycroft water-tube boilers fed steam to 2 four-cylinder triple-expansion steam engines rated at 4,200 indicated horsepower (3,100 kW). Two funnels were fitted. The ship's complement was originally to be 45 officers and men, but in operation a complement of 53 was prescribed.

Bruizer was laid down at Thornycroft's Chiswick shipyard, as Yard number 299, in April 1894. The ship was launched on 27 February 1895, with the naming ceremony performed by Miss Kathleen Barnaby, the daughter of the S.W. Barnaby the naval architect. Bruizer underwent sea trials on 29 March 1895, reaching a speed of 27.809 knots (51.502 km/h; 32.002 mph) over the measured mile and 27.97 knots (51.80 km/h; 32.19 mph) over a three-hour run. She was completed in June 1895.

== Service history ==
Bruizer took part in the 1896 British Naval manoeuvres, and was transferred to the Mediterranean Squadron during that year. She remained in the Mediterranean for several years. In April 1900 she visited Plataea together with HMS Vulcan. Lieutenant Robert Cathcart Kemble Lambert was appointed in command in 1902, and in April that year she took part in gunnery and tactical exercises. On 19 April 1907 the destroyer Ariel ran aground just outside Grand Harbour, Valletta, Malta. Bruizer rescued the crew of Ariel, all of whom survived.

Bruizer returned to home waters in 1911, serving with the Sixth Destroyer Flotilla in January 1912, and then with a submarine flotilla at Lamlash through to 1913.

She was sold for breaking for scrap to John Cashmore Ltd in 1914.

== Bibliography ==
- Brassey, T.A. (1897). The Naval Annual 1897. Portsmouth, UK: J. Griffin and Co.
- Brassey, T.A. (1902). The Naval Annual 1902. Portsmouth, UK: J. Griffin and Co.
- Chesneau, Roger & Kolesnik, Eugene M., eds. (1979). Conway's All The World's Fighting Ships 1860–1905. London: Conway Maritime Press. ISBN 0-85177-133-5.
- Colledge, J. J.; Warlow, Ben (2006) [1969]. Ships of the Royal Navy: The Complete Record of All Fighting Ships of the Royal Navy from the 15th Century to the Present (3rd Rev ed.). London: Chatham Publishing. ISBN 978-1-86176-281-8. OCLC 67375475.
- Friedman, Norman (2009). British Destroyers: From Earliest Days to the Second World War. Barnsley, UK: Seaforth Publishing. ISBN 978-1-84832-049-9.
- Gardiner, Robert & Gray, Randal, eds. (1985). Conway's All The World's Fighting Ships 1906–1921. London: Conway Maritime Press. ISBN 0-85177-245-5.
- Kemp, Paul (1999). The Admiralty Regrets: British Warship Losses of the 20th Century. Stroud, UK: Sutton Publishing. ISBN 0-7509-1567-6.
- Lyon, David (2001). The First Destroyers. London: Caxton Editions. ISBN 1-84067-3648.
- Manning, Thomas Dafys (1961). The British Destroyer. London: Putnam. OCLC 6470051.
