= HMS Skate (1895) =

Sturgeon-class destroyer

History

United Kingdom
- Name: HMS Skate
- Builder: Vickers
- Launched: 13 March 1895
- Out of service: Sold on 9 April 1907
- Fate: Scrapped

General characteristics
- Class & type: Sturgeon-class destroyer
- Displacement: 340 tons
- Length: 194 feet 6 inches (59.28 m)
- Beam: 19 feet (5.79 m)
- Draught: 7 feet 7 inches (2.31 m)
- Propulsion: Blechynden boilers; 4,000 hp (2,983 kW)
- Speed: 27 knots (50 km/h; 31 mph)
- Range: 1,370 nautical miles (2,540 km; 1,580 mi); at 11 knots (20 km/h; 13 mph)
- Complement: 53
- Armament: 1 × 12 pounder gun; 2 × torpedo tubes

HMS Skate was a Sturgeon-class destroyer which served with the Royal Navy. Built by Vickers, she was launched on 13 March 1895 and sold on 9 April 1907.

== Construction and design ==
On 8 November 1893, the British Admiralty placed an order with the Naval Construction and Armament Company of Barrow-in-Furness (later to become part of Vickers) for three "Twenty-Seven Knotter" destroyers as part of the 1893–1894 construction programme for the Royal Navy, with in total, 36 destroyers being ordered from various shipbuilders for this programme.

The Admiralty only laid down a series of broad requirements for the destroyers, leaving detailed design to the ships' builders. The requirements included a trial speed of 27 knots (31 mph; 50 km/h), a "turtleback" forecastle and a standard armament of a QF 12 pounder 12 cwt (3 in (76 mm) calibre) gun on a platform on the ship's conning tower (in practice the platform was also used as the ship's bridge), with a secondary armament of five 6-pounder guns, and two 18 inch (450 mm) torpedo tubes.

The Naval Construction and Armament Company produced a design with a length of 194 feet 6 inches (59.28 m) overall and 190 feet (57.91 m) between perpendiculars, with a beam of 19 feet (5.79 m) and a draught of 7 feet 7 inches (2.31 m). Displacement was 300 long tons light and 340 long tons deep load. Three funnels were fitted, with the foremast between the ship's bridge and the first funnel. Four Blechyndnen water-tube boilers fed steam at 200 pounds per square inch (1,400 kPa) to two three-cylinder triple expansion steam engines rated at 4,000 indicated horsepower (3,000 kW). 60 tons of coal were carried, giving a range of 1,370 nautical miles (2,540 km; 1,580 mi) at a speed of 11 knots (20 km/h; 13 mph). The ship's crew was 53 officers and men.

Skate was laid down on 20 March 1894 as Yard number 235, was launched on 13 March 1895 and completed in January 1896.

== Service history ==
Skate was in reserve at Devonport in 1897. She was commissioned to serve at the Mediterranean station in April 1900, and was ordered to return home in early 1902. She left Gibraltar on 9 May, convoyed by the cruiser Astraea, and arrived in Plymouth on 14 May. She paid off at Devonport on 20 May, and was placed in the A Division of the Fleet Reserve. She took part in the fleet review held at Spithead on 16 August 1902 for the coronation of King Edward VII. On 28 August she was attached to the Devonport instructional flotilla. During a cruise with the flotilla the following November, a heavy sea swept the upper deck and partially carried away the fore-bridge and twisted other fittings, leading skate to abort the cruise and return to dock for repairs.

In 1906 Skate was used as a target in firing trials of the effectiveness of various guns against destroyers. 3-pounder (47 mm) guns proved ineffective, having difficulty penetrating the ship's plating in end-on engagements, and while 12-pounder (3-in (76 mm)) guns caused more damage, it was concluded that a single hit could not be guaranteed to disable a destroyer. 4-inch (102 mm) guns proved much more effective, particularly when Lyddite-filled shells were used, and this led to a change in destroyer armament to 4-inch guns. Sold in 1907 to Cox & Co. of Falmouth, Cornwall for £305, she was the first destroyer of this type to go to the breakers.

== Bibliography ==
- Brassey, T.A. (1902). The Naval Annual 1902. Portsmouth, UK: J. Griffin and Co.
- Brown, David K. (2003). Warrior to Dreadnought: Warship Development 1860–1905. London: Caxton Editions. ISBN 1-84067-5292.
- Chesneau, Roger & Kolesnik, Eugene M., eds. (1979). Conway's All The World's Fighting Ships 1860–1905. London: Conway Maritime Press. ISBN 0-85177-133-5.
- Colledge, J. J.; Warlow, Ben (2006) [1969]. Ships of the Royal Navy: The Complete Record of All Fighting Ships of the Royal Navy from the 15th Century to the Present (3rd Rev ed.). London: Chatham Publishing. ISBN 978-1-86176-281-8. OCLC 67375475.
- Friedman, Norman (2009). British Destroyers: From Earliest Days to the Second World War. Barnsley, UK: Seaforth Publishing. ISBN 978-1-84832-049-9.
- Gardiner, Robert & Gray, Randal, eds. (1985). Conway's All The World's Fighting Ships 1906–1921. London: Conway Maritime Press. ISBN 0-85177-245-5.
- Layman, R. D. (1994). "Naval Kite Trials". In Roberts, John (ed.). Warship 1994. London: Conway Maritime Press. pp. 35–51. ISBN 0-85177-630-2.
- Lyon, David (2001) [1996]. The First Destroyers. London: Caxton Editions. ISBN 1-84067-3648.
- Manning, Captain T. D. (1961). The British Destroyer. Putnam and Co. OCLC 6470051.
- March, Edgar J. (1966). British Destroyers: A History of Development, 1892–1953; Drawn by Admiralty Permission From Official Records & Returns, Ships' Covers & Building Plans. London: Seeley Service. OCLC 164893555.
- "Speed Trials of the Torpedo Boat Destroyer Starfish" (PDF). The Engineer. 80: 365. 11 October 1895.
- "Ships: England: Sale of Obsolete War Vessels". Journal of the American Society of Naval Engineers. XIX (2): 562. May 1907.
