= Swordfish-class destroyer =

Subclass of the A-class destroyers

Class overview
- Name: Swordfish class
- Builders: Armstrong Whitworth, Elswick, Tyne and Wear
- Operators: Royal Navy
- Preceded by: Sturgeon class
- Succeeded by: Zebra class
- Built: 1894–1895
- In commission: 1895–1912
- Completed: 2
- Scrapped: 2

General characteristics
- Type: Torpedo boat destroyer
- Propulsion: Yarrow boilers
- Speed: 27 knots (50 km/h; 31 mph)
- Armament: 1 × 12 pounder gun; 2 × torpedo tubes

Two Swordfish-class destroyers served with the Royal Navy. Swordfish and Spitfire were both built by Armstrong Whitworth at Elswick, Tyne and Wear launching in 1895. Fitted with Yarrow boilers, they could make 27 knots and were armed with one twelve pounder and two torpedo tubes.

== Requirement ==
After ordering six prototype torpedo boat destroyers from the specialist torpedo boat yards Yarrows, Thornycroft and Laird as part of the 1892–1893 shipbuilding programme, the British Admiralty planned to buy larger numbers of destroyers under the 1893–1894 programme, with orders being spread over more shipyards. The Admiralty specified a number of broad requirement, leaving the detailed design of the ships and their machinery to the builders. The new destroyers were required top reach a trials speed of 27 knots (31 mph; 50 km/h), with penalty charges imposed if the ship's did not meet the guaranteed speeds or were delivered late. A turtleback forecastle was to be fitted. Armament was to vary depending on whether the ship was to be used in the torpedo boat or gunboat role. As a torpedo boat, the planned armament was a single QF 12 pounder 12 cwt (3 in (76 mm) calibre) gun, together with a secondary gun armament of three 6-pounder guns, and two 18 inch (450 mm) torpedo tubes. As a gunboat, one of the torpedo tubes could be removed to accommodate a further two six-pounders.

On 8 December 1893, the Admiralty placed an order for a single 27-knotter destroyer (Swordfish) with Armstrong Mitchell & Co with an order for a second destroyer (Spitfire) following on 7 February 1894. The ships' machinery was to be supplied by Belliss & Co of Birmingham. Eight Yarrow-type water-tube boilers provided steam at a pressure of 200 psi (1,400 kPa), feeding two four-cylinder triple-expansion steam engines and driving two propeller shafts. Three widely spaced funnels were fitted, with the middle funnel being fatter than the other two as it handled the uptakes from four boilers rather than two as did the other funnels.

Both ships had been sold for scrapping before 1913 when the Admiralty re-classed the surviving 27-knotter destroyers as the A Class.

== See also ==
- A-class destroyer (1913)

== Bibliography ==
- Brooke, Peter (1999). Warships for Export: Armstrong Warships 1867–1927. Gravesend, UK: World Ship Society. ISBN 0-905617-89-4.
- Chesneau, Roger & Kolesnik, Eugene M., eds. (1979). Conway's All The World's Fighting Ships 1860–1905. London: Conway Maritime Press. ISBN 0-85177-133-5.
- Colledge, J. J.; Warlow, Ben (2006) [1969]. Ships of the Royal Navy: The Complete Record of All Fighting Ships of the Royal Navy from the 15th Century to the Present (3rd Rev ed.). London: Chatham Publishing. ISBN 978-1-86176-281-8. OCLC 67375475.
- Friedman, Norman (2009). British Destroyers: From Earliest Days to the Second World War. Barnsley, UK: Seaforth Publishing. ISBN 978-1-84832-049-9.
- Gardiner, Robert & Gray, Randal, eds. (1985). Conway's All The World's Fighting Ships 1906–1921. London: Conway Maritime Press. ISBN 0-85177-245-5.
- Lyon, David (2001) [1996]. The First Destroyers. London: Caxton Editions. ISBN 1-84067-3648.
- Manning, Captain T. D. (1979) [1961]. The British Destroyer. Godfrey Cave Associates. ISBN 0-906223-13-X.
- March, Edgar J. (1966). British Destroyers: A History of Development, 1892–1953; Drawn by Admiralty Permission From Official Records & Returns, Ships' Covers & Building Plans. London: Seeley Service. OCLC 164893555.
