= HMS Starfish (1895) =

Sturgeon-class destroyer

History

United Kingdom
- Name: HMS Starfish
- Ordered: 8 November 1893
- Builder: Vickers
- Laid down: 22 March 1894
- Launched: 26 January 1895
- Commissioned: January 1896
- Fate: Sold 1912

General characteristics
- Class & type: Sturgeon-class destroyer
- Displacement: 300 long tons (300 t) light, 340 long tons (350 t) deep load
- Length: 194 ft 6 in (59.28 m) oa; 190 feet (57.91 m) pp
- Beam: 19 ft (5.79 m)
- Draught: 7 ft 7 in (2.31 m)
- Installed power: 4,000 ihp (2,983 kW)
- Propulsion: 4 × Blechynden boilers, 2 × Vertical Triple Expansion steam engines
- Speed: 27 knots (50 km/h; 31 mph)
- Range: 1,370 nmi (2,540 km; 1,580 mi) at 11 kn (20 km/h; 13 mph)
- Complement: 53
- Armament: 1 × 12 pounder gun; 5 × QF 6-pdr 8 cwt; 2 × 18 inch (450 mm) torpedo tubes

HMS Starfish was a Sturgeon-class destroyer which served with the Royal Navy. Built by Vickers, she was launched in 1895 and sold in 1912.

== Construction and design ==
On 8 November 1893, the British Admiralty placed an order with the Naval Construction and Armament Company of Barrow-in-Furness (later to become part of Vickers) for three "Twenty-Seven Knotter" destroyers as part of the 1893–1894 construction programme for the Royal Navy, with in total, 36 destroyers being ordered from various shipbuilders for this programme.

The Admiralty only laid down a series of broad requirements for the destroyers, leaving detailed design to the ships' builders. The requirements included a trial speed of 27 knots (31 mph; 50 km/h), a "turtleback" forecastle and a standard armament of a QF 12 pounder 12 cwt (3 in (76 mm) calibre) gun on a platform on the ship's conning tower (in practice the platform was also used as the ship's bridge), with a secondary armament of five 6-pounder guns, and two 18 inch (450 mm) torpedo tubes.

The Naval Construction and Armament Company produced a design with a length of 194 feet 6 inches (59.28 m) overall and 190 feet (57.91 m) between perpendiculars, with a beam of 19 feet (5.79 m) and a draught of 7 feet 7 inches (2.31 m). Displacement was 300 long tons (300 t) light and 340 long tons (350 t) deep load. Three funnels were fitted, with the foremast between the ship's bridge and the first funnel. Four Blechyndnen water-tube boilers fed steam at 200 pounds per square inch (1,400 kPa) to two three-cylinder triple expansion steam engines rated at 4,000 indicated horsepower (3,000 kW). 60 tons of coal were carried, giving a range of 1,370 nautical miles (2,540 km; 1,580 mi) at a speed of 11 knots (20 km/h; 13 mph). The ship's crew was 53 officers and men.

HMS Starfish was laid down on 22 March 1894 as the second of Naval Construction and Armament Company's three destroyers, and was launched on 26 January 1895. During sea trials in October 1895, Starfish made an average speed of 27.87 knots (51.62 km/h; 32.07 mph) over six runs over a measured mile, meeting the 27 knots (50 km/h; 31 mph) requirement of the specification. Starfish was commissioned in January 1896.

== Service ==
Starfish served throughout her career in home waters, being prone to failures of her propeller brackets, which were made of forged scrap iron. In late January 1900 it was announced that she would be commissioned as tender to the gunnery school HMS Excellent. In 1900–1901, Starfish was used in tests of a modified spar torpedo for use as an anti-submarine weapon. The 42 feet (13 m) long spar, carrying an explosive charge, would be swung out and immersed in the water in action, and detonated as the submarine was passed.

Starfish was attached to the torpedo school HMS Vernon at Portsmouth in 1901, participating in the 1901 Naval Manoeuvres. She took part in the fleet review held at Spithead on 16 August 1902 for the coronation of King Edward VII. In April 1903, Starfish was used for trials of the use of kites designed by Samuel Cody for lifting radio antennae. On 26 October 1907 a minor collision took place between Starfish and the destroyer Daring at Devonport, both ships' hulls being dented.

Starfish was laid up at Devonport for disposal in 1910, and was sold for scrap to Thos. W. Ward of Preston on 15 May 1912.

== Bibliography ==
- Brassey, T.A. (1902). The Naval Annual 1902. Portsmouth, UK: J. Griffin and Co.
- Chesneau, Roger & Kolesnik, Eugene M., eds. (1979). Conway's All The World's Fighting Ships 1860–1905. London: Conway Maritime Press. ISBN 0-85177-133-5.
- Colledge, J. J.; Warlow, Ben (2006) [1969]. Ships of the Royal Navy: The Complete Record of All Fighting Ships of the Royal Navy from the 15th Century to the Present (3rd Rev ed.). London: Chatham Publishing. ISBN 978-1-86176-281-8. OCLC 67375475.
- Friedman, Norman (2009). British Destroyers: From Earliest Days to the Second World War. Barnsley, UK: Seaforth Publishing. ISBN 978-1-84832-049-9.
- Gardiner, Robert & Gray, Randal, eds. (1985). Conway's All The World's Fighting Ships 1906–1921. London: Conway Maritime Press. ISBN 0-85177-245-5.
- Layman, R. D. (1994). "Naval Kite Trials". In Roberts, John (ed.). Warship 1994. London: Conway Maritime Press. pp. 35–51. ISBN 0-85177-630-2.
- Lyon, David (2001). The First Destroyers. London: Caxton Editions. ISBN 1-84067-3648.
- Manning, Captain T. D. (1961). The British Destroyer. Putnam and Co. OCLC 6470051.
- "Speed Trials of the Torpedo Boat Destroyer Starfish" (PDF). The Engineer. Vol. 80. 11 October 1895. p. 365.
