= HMS Ardent (1894) =

Ardent-class destroyer

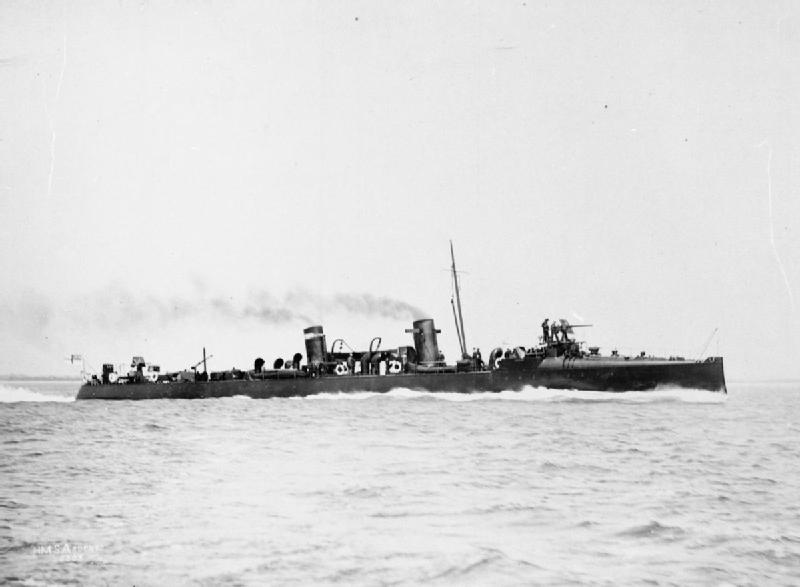
- Ardent

History

United Kingdom
- Name: Ardent
- Builder: Thornycroft, Chiswick
- Laid down: December 1893
- Launched: 16 October 1894
- Commissioned: 30 April 1895
- Motto: Death rather than disgrace
- Fate: Sold for breaking, 10 October 1911

General characteristics
- Class & type: Thornycroft 27 knot - 2 funnel destroyer
- Displacement: 265 tons (1901)
- Length: 201 ft 8 in (61.47 m)
- Beam: 19 ft (5.8 m)
- Draught: 7 ft 3 in (2.21 m)
- Installed power: 4,300 ihp (forced draught)
- Propulsion: 2 × Thornycroft vertical triple-expansion steam engines; 4 × Thornycroft coal-fired water-tube boilers; 2 × shafts
- Speed: 27 knots (50 km/h; 31 mph)
- Endurance: 60 tons of coal; 1,750 nm at 13 knots
- Complement: 53 officers and men
- Armament: 1 × 12-pounder 12 cwt QF Mark I naval gun on a P Mark I low angle mount; 5 × QF 6-pounder 8 cwt Mark I naval guns on a P Mark I * low angle mount; 2 × 18 inch (450 mm) torpedo tube (single launchers)

HMS Ardent was a Royal Navy 27 knot torpedo boat destroyer ordered from John I Thornycroft & Company under the 1893 – 1894 Naval Estimates. She was the sixth ship to carry this name.

== Construction and design ==
On 12 October 1893, the British Admiralty placed an order for three torpedo boat destroyers (Ardent, Boxer and Bruizer) with the shipbuilder Thornycroft under the 1893–1894 shipbuilding programme for the Royal Navy as a follow-on to the two prototype destroyers (Daring and Decoy) ordered from Thornycroft under the 1892–1893 programme. (Note: Three more destroyers were ordered from Yarrow on the same date, while a further 30 destroyers were later ordered from other shipbuilders under the same programme.)

The Admiralty did not specify a standard design for destroyers, laying down broad requirements, including a trial speed of 27 knots (31 mph; 50 km/h), a "turtleback" forecastle (Note: A fore deck with exaggerated camber designed to throw off sea water at high speeds.) and armament, which was to vary depending on whether the ship was to be used in the torpedo boat or gunboat role. As a torpedo boat, the planned armament was a single QF 12 pounder 12 cwt (3 in (76 mm) calibre) gun on a platform on the ship's conning tower (in practice the platform was also used as the ship's bridge), together with a secondary gun armament of three 6-pounder guns, and two 18 in (450 mm) torpedo tubes. As a gunboat, one of the torpedo tubes could be removed to accommodate a further two six-pounders.

Thornycroft's design (known as the Ardent-class) was 201 feet 8 inches (61.47 m) long overall and 201 feet 6 inches (61.42 m) between perpendiculars, with a beam of 19 feet (5.79 m) and a draught of 7 feet 3 1/4 inches (2.22 m). Displacement was 245 long tons (249 t) light and 301 long tons (306 t) full load. Three Thornycroft water-tube boilers fed steam to 2 four-cylinder triple-expansion steam engines rated at 4,200 indicated horsepower (3,100 kW). Two funnels were fitted.

Ardent was laid down as Yard number 297 in December 1893 at the Thornycroft shipyard at Church Wharf, Chiswick and launched on 16 October 1894 by Mrs C.T. Cornish, the daughter of the company founder John Isaac Thornycroft. During her builder's trials at Maplin Sound on 9 November 1894 the ship achieved an average speed of 29.182 knots on her full power run. Her boiler pressure was 210 pounds per square inch with shafts turning at an average of 407 revolutions per minute. She reached a speed of 27.84 knots (51.56 km/h; 32.04 mph) over the measured mile and a six-hour average speed of 27.97 knots (51.80 km/h; 32.19 mph) during official trials on 15 December 1894. Ardent was completed on 25 March 1895.

== Service history ==
The torpedo boat destroyer was commissioned into the Royal Navy on 30 April 1895 at Portsmouth under the command of Lieutenant & Commander Godfrey H B Mundy for service on the Mediterranean Station based at Malta. Ardent departed Portsmouth on 14 May 1895, stopping at Plymouth to join the third-class cruiser HMS Pique. They departed for Malta on 15 May 1895. Upon her arrival she became tender to the fleet flagship, the battleship Ramillies. Among Ardent′s duties was the training of stokers in the management of water-tube boilers.

On 31 March 1901, Ardent was listed as being at Malta for the British Empire census. In April 1902 she was on tactical and gunnery exercises with the Mediterranean Fleet, and in September that year she was part of a squadron visiting the Aegean Sea for combined manoeuvres near Nauplia and Souda Bay at Crete. She paid off at Gibraltar on 22 October 1902. On 17 April 1906, the torpedo boat TB 84 was in collision with Ardent while carrying out exercises at night off Malta. TB 84 sank, with one of her crew being killed in the accident.

Upon her return to home waters in early 1911, Ardent was paid off into reserve. She was listed on the July 1911 (Quarterly) Navy List as being for sale. Ardent was sold on 10 October 1911 for breaking, raising a price of £1400.
