= HMS Rocket (1894) =

Rocket-class destroyer

History

United Kingdom
- Name: Rocket
- Builder: J & G Thompson, Clydebank
- Laid down: 14 February 1894
- Launched: 14 August 1894
- Completed: July 1895
- Fate: Sold for scrap, April 1912

General characteristics
- Class & type: Rocket-class destroyer
- Displacement: 280 long tons (284 t)
- Length: 203 ft 9 in (62.1 m) (o/a)
- Beam: 19 ft 6 in (5.9 m)
- Draught: 6 ft 9 in (2.1 m)
- Installed power: 4 Normand boilers; 4,100 ihp (3,057 kW)
- Propulsion: 2 triple-expansion steam engine
- Speed: 27 knots (50 km/h; 31 mph)
- Range: 1,445 nautical miles (2,676 km; 1,663 mi) at 11 knots (20 km/h; 13 mph)
- Armament: 1 × 12 pdr (3 in (76 mm)) gun; 5 × 6 pdr (2.2 in (57 mm)) guns; 2 × 18 in (450 mm) torpedo tubes

HMS Rocket was the lead ship of her class of three destroyers built for the Royal Navy in the 1890s. Completed in 1895 she served mostly in home waters and was sold for scrap in 1912.

== Description ==
Ordered as part of the 1893–1894 Naval Programme, the Rocket-class torpedo boat destroyers were J & G Thompson's first such ships. They displaced 280 long tons (280 t) at normal load and 325 long tons (330 t) at deep load. The ships had an overall length of 203 feet 9 inches (62.1 m), a beam of 19 feet 6 inches (5.9 m) and a draught of 6 feet 9 inches (2.1 m). They were powered by a pair of triple-expansion steam engines, each driving a single propeller shaft using steam provided by four Normand boilers. The engines developed 4,100 indicated horsepower (3,100 kW) and were intended to give a maximum speed of 27 knots (50 km/h; 31 mph). During her sea trials Rocket reached 27.6 knots (51.1 km/h; 31.8 mph) from 4,123 ihp (3,075 kW). The Rocket-class ships carried a maximum of 75 long tons (76 t) of coal that gave them a range of 1,445 nautical miles (2,676 km; 1,663 mi) at 11 knots (20 km/h; 13 mph). Their crew numbered 53 officers and ratings.

The ships were armed with a single quick-firing (QF) 12-pounder (3 in (76 mm) Mk I gun and five QF 6-pounder (2.2 in (57 mm)) Mk I Hotchkiss guns in single mounts. Their torpedo armament consisted of two rotating torpedo tubes for 18-inch (450 mm) torpedoes, one mount amidships and the other on the stern.

== Construction and career ==
Rocket was ordered on 3 November 1893 for delivery within 12 months. The ship was laid down as Yard number 269 by J & G Thompson at its Clydebank shipyard on 14 February 1894, launched on 14 August and completed in July 1895. While delivered later than contracted, Rocket was still one of the quickest to build of the 27-knotter destroyers ordered as part of the 1893–94 shipbuilding programme, and the design was considered satisfactory by the Admiralty, although in March 1896, a report in the newspaper The Times noted that her boilers were prone to priming at speeds over 14 kn (16 mph; 26 km/h), that her machinery had broken down five times, and that she was likely to be relieved from her duties with the particular Service Squadron as soon as a replacement ship became available.

After her commission she served at the North America and West Indies Station under the command of Lieutenant Adolphus Huddlestone Williamson. She was ordered to return home in early 1902, but the order was cancelled and she was still in North American waters when she was at Halifax, Nova Scotia in September, and then visited Trinidad in December 1902.

In 1910, Rocket was disarmed, and used for radio experiments. The ship was sold for scrap on 10 April 1912 to Ward of Preston.

== Bibliography ==
- Chesneau, Roger & Kolesnik, Eugene M, eds. (1979). Conway's All The World's Fighting Ships 1860–1905. London: Conway Maritime Press. ISBN 0-85177-133-5.
- Colledge, J. J.; Warlow, Ben (2006) [1969]. Ships of the Royal Navy: The Complete Record of All Fighting Ships of the Royal Navy from the 15th Century to the Present (3rd Rev ed.). London: Chatham Publishing. ISBN 978-1-86176-281-8. OCLC 67375475.
- Friedman, Norman (2009). British Destroyers: From Earliest Days to the Second World War. Barnsley, UK: Seaforth Publishing. ISBN 978-1-84832-049-9.
- Gardiner, Robert & Gray, Randal, eds. (1985). Conway's All The World's Fighting Ships 1906–1921. London: Conway Maritime Press. ISBN 0-85177-245-5.
- Johnston, Ian (2015). Ships for All Nations: John Brown & Company Clydebank 1847–1971 (2nd ed.). Annapolis, Maryland: Naval Institute Press. ISBN 978-1-59114-584-4.
- Lyon, David (2001) [1996]. The First Destroyers. London: Caxton Editions. ISBN 1-84067-3648.
- March, Edgar J. (1966). British Destroyers: A History of Development, 1892–1953; Drawn by Admiralty Permission From Official Records & Returns, Ships' Covers & Building Plans. London: Seeley Service. OCLC 164893555.
