= Ardent-class destroyer =

Subclass of the A-class destroyers

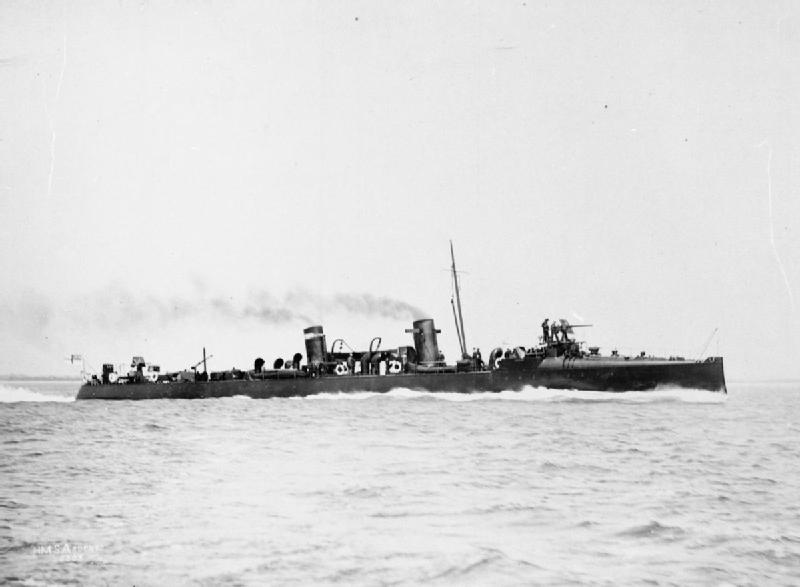
- HMS Ardent

Class overview
- Name: Ardent class
- Builders: Thornycroft, Church Wharf, Chiswick
- Operators: Royal Navy
- Preceded by: Ferret class
- Succeeded by: Charger class
- Built: 1893-1895
- In commission: 1895–1918
- Completed: 3
- Lost: 1
- Retired: 2

General characteristics
- Type: Torpedo boat destroyer
- Displacement: 245 long tons (249 t) (light); 301 long tons (306 t) (full load)
- Length: 201 ft 8 in (61.47 m) (overall); 201 ft 6 in (61.42 m) (waterline)
- Beam: 19 ft (5.8 m) (overall)
- Draught: 7 ft 3.25 in (2.2162 m)
- Depth: 13 ft (4.0 m)
- Propulsion: Triple expansion steam engines; Coal-fired water-tube boilers
- Complement: 50
- Armament: 1 × 12-pounder gun; 5 × 6-pounder guns; 2 × 18 inch (450 mm) torpedo tubes

The three Ardent-class torpedo boat destroyers ("Thornycroft 27-knot (50 km/h) ") were ordered by the British Admiralty on 12 October 1893 and served with the Royal Navy. Built by Thornycroft for a contract price of £110,520 for all three vessels, they displaced 301 tons fully laden, and were 201 feet 8 inches (61.47 m) long overall.

As part of the 1893–1894 Naval Estimates, the British Admiralty placed orders for 36 torpedo-boat destroyers, all to be capable of 27 knots (50 km/h; 31 mph), the "27-Knotters", as a follow-on to the six prototype "26-knotters" ordered in the previous 1892–1893 Estimates. As was typical for torpedo craft at the time, the Admiralty left detailed design to the builders, laying down only broad requirements.

The Ardent-class were derived from the preceding 26-knot (48 km/h) Daring class, but were larger and more powerfully engined. It was originally intended that they would be armed with one 12-pounder quick-firing gun forward and three 6-pounder guns, mounted on the broadside and aft, and three 18-inch torpedo tubes, one fixed in a bow mount and two on a revolving mount abaft the two funnels; however the fixed bow tube fitted in the preceding '26-knotter' type had subsequently been found to throw up too much spray and was removed, and in October 1893 it was agreed that the bow tube should be omitted, giving "a clean sharp stem with no projections" and instead two extra 6-pounder guns were installed en echelon amidships. These three ships - and the similar three Charger Class destroyers (ordered from Yarrow in the same week) - were the first TBDs to omit this fixed bow tube. They carried a complement of 2 officers and 48 ratings (comprising 20 deck department and 28 engine room compartment).

These three ship met the speed requirement of 27 knots for which they were designed. Over the measured mile and in three-hour trials they averaged the following power (ihp) and speed:

Name	Trials ihp (measured mile)	Trials speed (knots)	R.P.M.	Trials ihp (three hours)	Trials speed (knots)	R.P.M.	Displacement (tons)
Ardent	4,343	27.84	399	4,306	27.973	396.4	245
Boxer	4,487	29.076	412	4,543	29.175	412.7	243
Bruiser	4,681	27.809	372	4,257	27.97	372.8	259

At her second preliminary trial, Ardent reached 29 knots with 407 r.p.m., the engines developing 5,044 ihp. However, Boxer was the fastest British destroyer among all the 27-knotters, her best run over the measured mile being 30¾ knots.

In September 1913 the Admiralty re-classed all the remaining 27-knotter destroyers as A Class; this applied to both Boxer and Bruiser, although the Ardent herself had already been scrapped. Bruiser was sold for scrap eight months later, prior to the start of WW1, while Boxer was the oldest destroyer in service in the Royal Navy during the First World War, although the oldest destroyer-type vessel was the large 'torpedo boat/torpedo boat chaser' TB.81 (ex-Swift), a destroyer precursor.

== Vessels in class ==
Name	Builder	Yard Number	First cost	Laid down	Launched	Completed	Fate
Ardent	John I. Thornycroft	297	£39,555	December 1893	16 October 1894	25 March 1895	Sold 10 October 1911
Boxer	John I. Thornycroft	298	£39,505	February 1894	28 November 1894	June 1895	Sunk in collision 8 February 1918
Bruiser	John I. Thornycroft	299	£39,406	April 1894	27 February 1895	June 1895	Sold 26 May 1914

== Bibliography ==
- Chesneau, Roger & Kolesnik, Eugene M., eds. (1979). Conway's All The World's Fighting Ships 1860–1905. London: Conway Maritime Press. ISBN 0-85177-133-5.
- Colledge, J. J.; Warlow, Ben (2006) [1969]. Ships of the Royal Navy: The Complete Record of All Fighting Ships of the Royal Navy from the 15th Century to the Present (3rd Rev ed.). London: Chatham Publishing. ISBN 978-1-86176-281-8. OCLC 67375475.
- Friedman, Norman (2009). British Destroyers: From Earliest Days to the Second World War. Barnsley, UK: Seaforth Publishing. ISBN 978-1-84832-049-9.
- Gardiner, Robert & Gray, Randal, eds. (1985). Conway's All The World's Fighting Ships 1906–1921. London: Conway Maritime Press. ISBN 0-85177-245-5.
- Lyon, David (2001) [1996]. The First Destroyers. London: Caxton Editions. ISBN 1-84067-364-8.
- Manning, T. D. (1961). The British Destroyer. Putnam & Co. OCLC 6470051.
- March, Edgar J. (1966). British Destroyers: A History of Development, 1892–1953; Drawn by Admiralty Permission From Official Records & Returns, Ships' Covers & Building Plans. London: Seeley Service. OCLC 164893555.
