= HMS Spitfire (1895) =

Swordfish-class destroyer

History

United Kingdom
- Name: HMS Spitfire
- Namesake: Spitfire
- Ordered: 1893
- Builder: Armstrong Mitchell & Co., Elswick, Tyne and Wear
- Laid down: 1894
- Launched: 7 June 1895
- Commissioned: November 1896
- Decommissioned: 1912
- Fate: Sold, 1912

General characteristics
- Class & type: Swordfish-class destroyer
- Propulsion: Yarrow boilers
- Speed: 27 knots (50 km/h; 31 mph)
- Armament: 1 × 12 pounder gun; 2 × torpedo tubes

HMS Spitfire was one of two Swordfish-class destroyers which served with the Royal Navy. She was launched on 7 June 1895 by Armstrong Mitchell & Co. at Newcastle upon Tyne and sold off in 1912. Her fate is unknown.

== Service history ==
Spitfire served in home waters. In early February 1900 she had repairs at Chatham, before joining the Medway instructional flotilla on 26 February to replace HMS Coquette, whose crew under the command of Lieutenant Charles Pipon Beaty-Pownall turned over to her from 7 March. She was tender to Wildfire, the shore establishment at Sheerness. She underwent repairs to re-tube her boilers in 1902. On 7 May 1902 she was commissioned as tender to the cruiser Immortalité, which itself served as a sea-going tender at Sheerness.

== Bibliography ==
- Chesneau, Roger & Kolesnik, Eugene M., eds. (1979). Conway's All The World's Fighting Ships 1860–1905. London: Conway Maritime Press. ISBN 0-85177-133-5.
- Colledge, J. J.; Warlow, Ben (2006) [1969]. Ships of the Royal Navy: The Complete Record of All Fighting Ships of the Royal Navy from the 15th Century to the Present (3rd Rev ed.). London: Chatham Publishing. ISBN 978-1-86176-281-8. OCLC 67375475.
- Friedman, Norman (2009). British Destroyers: From Earliest Days to the Second World War. Barnsley, UK: Seaforth Publishing. ISBN 978-1-84832-049-9.
- Gardiner, Robert & Gray, Randal, eds. (1985). Conway's All The World's Fighting Ships 1906–1921. London: Conway Maritime Press. ISBN 0-85177-245-5.
- Lyon, David (2001) [1996]. The First Destroyers. London: Caxton Editions. ISBN 1-84067-364-8.
- Manning, T. D. (1961). The British Destroyer. Putnam & Co. OCLC 6470051.
- March, Edgar J. (1966). British Destroyers: A History of Development, 1892–1953; Drawn by Admiralty Permission From Official Records & Returns, Ships' Covers & Building Plans. London: Seeley, Service. OCLC 164893555.
