= HMS Sturgeon (1894) =

Sturgeon-class destroyer

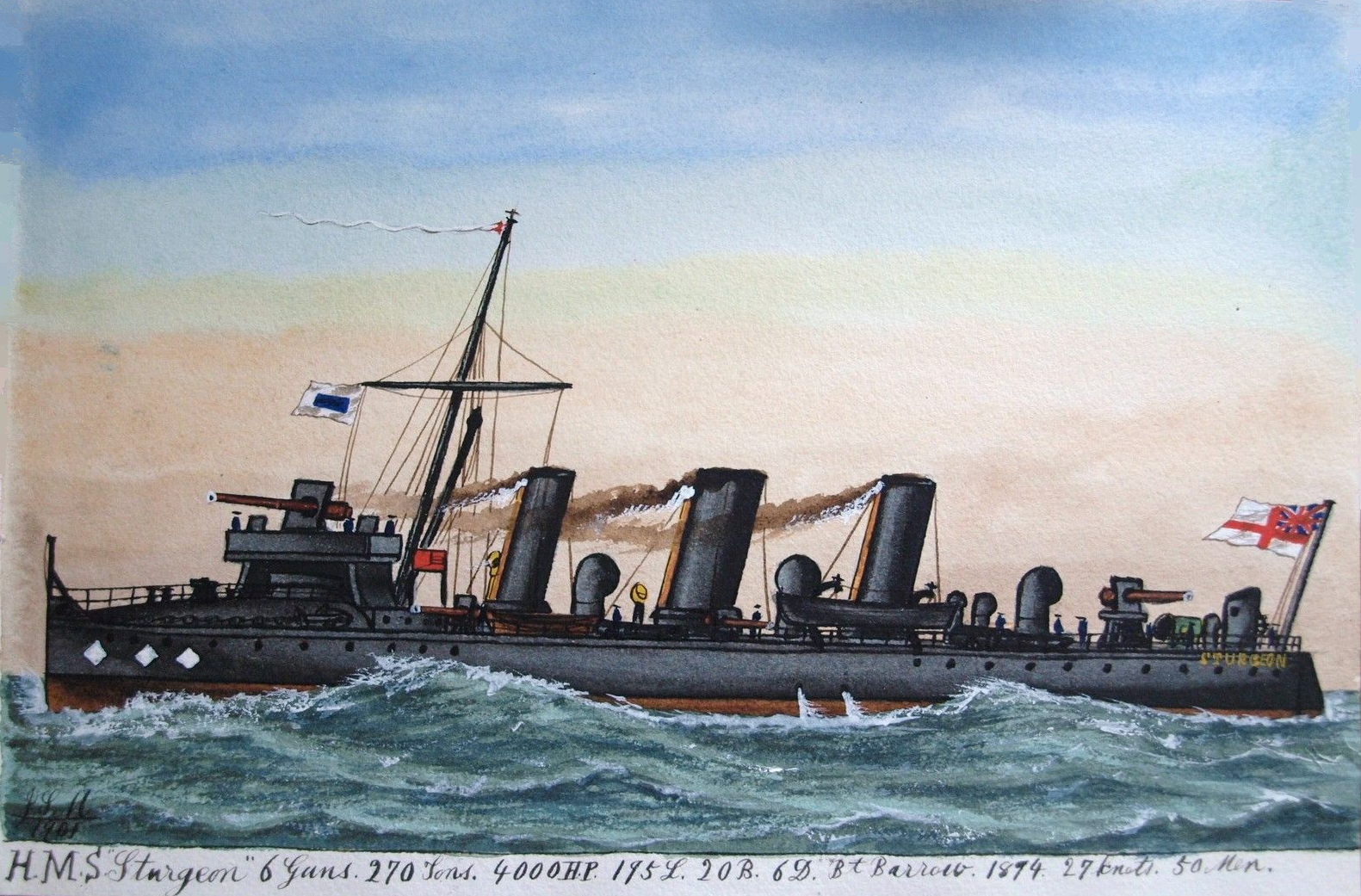
- A watercolour of Sturgeon c. 1901

History

United Kingdom
- Name: HMS Sturgeon
- Builder: Vickers
- Launched: 21 July 1894
- Fate: Sold, 1910

General characteristics
- Class & type: Sturgeon-class destroyer
- Propulsion: Blechynden boilers, 4,000 hp (2,983 kW)
- Speed: 27 knots (50 km/h; 31 mph)
- Complement: 53
- Armament: 1 × 12 pounder gun; 2 × torpedo tubes

HMS Sturgeon was the lead ship of the Sturgeon-class destroyers which served with the Royal Navy. Built by Vickers, she was launched in 1894 and sold in 1910.

== Construction and design ==
On 8 November 1893, the British Admiralty placed an order with the Naval Construction and Armament Company of Barrow-in-Furness (later to become part of Vickers) for three "Twenty-Seven Knotter" destroyers as part of the 1893–1894 construction programme for the Royal Navy, with in total, 36 destroyers being ordered from various shipbuilders for this programme.

The Admiralty only laid down a series of broad requirements for the destroyers, leaving detailed design to the ships' builders. The requirements included a trial speed of 27 knots (31 mph; 50 km/h), a "turtleback" forecastle and a standard armament of a QF 12 pounder 12 cwt (3 in (76 mm) calibre) gun on a platform on the ship's conning tower (in practice the platform was also used as the ship's bridge), with a secondary armament of five 6-pounder guns, and two 18 inch (450 mm) torpedo tubes.

The Naval Construction and Armament Company produced a design with a length of 194 feet 6 inches (59.28 m) overall and 190 feet (57.91 m) between perpendiculars, with a beam of 19 feet (5.79 m) and a draught of 7 feet 7 inches (2.31 m). Displacement was 300 long tons (300 t) light and 340 long tons (350 t) deep load. Three funnels were fitted, with the foremast between the ship's bridge and the first funnel. Four Blechynden water-tube boilers fed steam at 200 pounds per square inch (1,400 kPa) to two three-cylinder triple expansion steam engines rated at 4,000 indicated horsepower (3,000 kW). A speed of 27.6 knots (51.1 km/h; 31.8 mph) was reached during sea trials. 60 tons of coal were carried, giving a range of 1,370 nautical miles (2,540 km; 1,580 mi) at a speed of 11 knots (20 km/h; 13 mph). The ship's crew was 53 officers and men.

== Service ==
Sturgeon served in home waters for the whole of her career. She took part in the fleet review held at Spithead on 26 June 1897 to celebrate the Diamond Jubilee of Queen Victoria. From 1899 she served in the Medway Instructional Flotilla under Commander Murray MacGregor Lockhart, but in March 1900 she was replaced by HMS Cynthia to which Commander Lockhart also transferred. She left this for other service in late 1900. The following year she again took up with the Medway instructional flotilla, replacing Mallard. She had a refit in early 1902. In May 1902 she received the officers and men from the destroyer Stag, and was again commissioned at Chatham on 8 May by Lieutenant John Maxwell D. E. Warren for service with the Flotilla. She took part in the Spithead fleet review held on 16 August 1902 for the coronation of King Edward VII, and later the same month was placed in dockyard hands at Sheerness for her boilers to be re-tubed.
