= Rocket-class destroyer =

Subclass of the A-class destroyers

Class overview
- Name: Rocket class
- Builders: J & G Thomson, Clydebank
- Operators: Royal Navy
- Preceded by: Sunfish class
- Succeeded by: Sturgeon class
- Built: 1894–1895
- In commission: 1894–1920
- Completed: 3
- Scrapped: 3

General characteristics
- Type: Torpedo boat destroyer
- Displacement: 280 long tons (284 t)
- Length: 200 ft (61 m)
- Propulsion: 4 x Normand boilers, 2 x triple expansion steam engines rated 4,100 hp (3,057 kW)
- Speed: 27 knots (50 km/h; 31 mph)
- Complement: 53
- Armament: 1 × 12 pounder gun; 2 × torpedo tubes

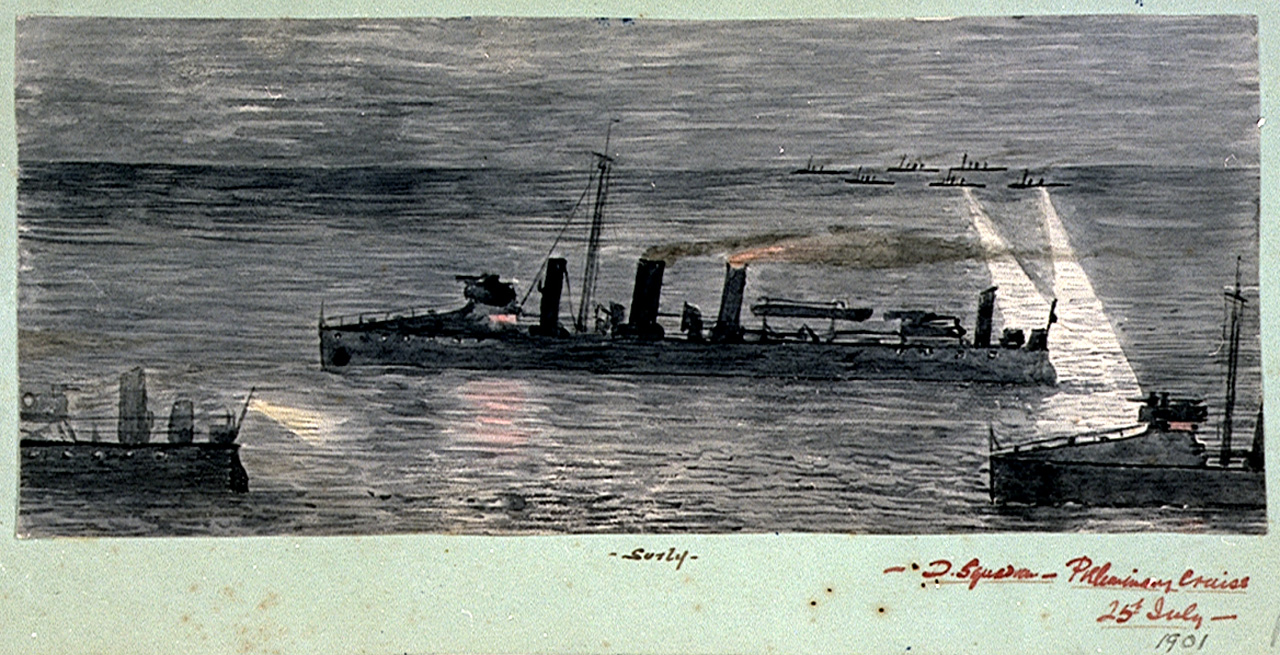
HMS Surly during manoeuvres, 25 July 1901

Three Rocket-class destroyers served with the Royal Navy.

Under the 1893–1894 Naval Estimates, the British Admiralty placed orders for 36 torpedo-boat destroyers, all to be capable of 27 knots (50 km/h; 31 mph), the "27-knotters", as a follow-on to the six prototype "26-knotters" ordered in the previous 1892–1893 Estimates. As was typical for torpedo craft at the time, the Admiralty left detailed design to the builders, laying down only broad requirements.

HMS Rocket, HMS Shark and HMS Surly were built by J & G Thomson and launched at Clydebank in 1894. The ships displaced 280 tons, were 200 ft (61 m) long and their Normand boilers produced 4,100 horsepower (3,100 kW). to give a top speed of 27 knots (50 km/h; 31 mph). They were armed with one 12-pounder and two torpedo tubes. They carried a complement of 53 officers and men.

In September 1913 the Admiralty re-classed all the surviving 27-knotter destroyers as A Class although this only applied to Surly as the other two ships had been sold for scrap in 1912.

== See also ==
- A-class destroyer (1913)

== Bibliography ==
- Chesneau, Roger & Kolesnik, Eugene M, eds. (1979). Conway's All The World's Fighting Ships 1860–1905. London: Conway Maritime Press. ISBN 0-85177-133-5.
- Colledge, J. J.; Warlow, Ben (2006) [1969]. Ships of the Royal Navy: The Complete Record of All Fighting Ships of the Royal Navy from the 15th Century to the Present (3rd Rev ed.). London: Chatham Publishing. ISBN 978-1-86176-281-8. OCLC 67375475.
- Friedman, Norman (2009). British Destroyers: From Earliest Days to the Second World War. Barnsley, UK: Seaforth Publishing. ISBN 978-1-84832-049-9.
- Gardiner, Robert & Gray, Randal, eds. (1985). Conway's All The World's Fighting Ships 1906–1921. London: Conway Maritime Press. ISBN 0-85177-245-5.
- Johnston, Ian (2015). Ships for All Nations: John Brown & Company Clydebank 1847–1971 (2nd ed.). Annapolis, Maryland: Naval Institute Press. ISBN 978-1-59114-584-4.
- March, Edgar J. (1966). British Destroyers: A History of Development, 1892–1953; Drawn by Admiralty Permission From Official Records & Returns, Ships' Covers & Building Plans. London: Seeley, Service. OCLC 164893555.
