= HMS Shark (1894) =

Rocket-class destroyer

History

United Kingdom
- Name: Shark
- Builder: J & G Thompson, Clydebank
- Laid down: 14 February 1894
- Launched: 14 August 1894
- Completed: July 1895
- Fate: Sold for scrap, April 1912

General characteristics
- Class & type: Rocket-class destroyer
- Displacement: 280 long tons (284 t)
- Length: 203 ft 9 in (62.1 m) (o/a)
- Beam: 19 ft 6 in (5.9 m)
- Draught: 6 ft 9 in (2.1 m)
- Installed power: 4 Normand boilers; 4,100 ihp (3,057 kW)
- Propulsion: 2 triple-expansion steam engine
- Speed: 27 knots (50 km/h; 31 mph)
- Range: 1,445 nautical miles (2,676 km; 1,663 mi) at 11 knots (20 km/h; 13 mph)
- Armament: 1 × 12 pdr (3 in (76 mm)) gun; 5 × 6 pdr (2.2 in (57 mm)) guns; 2 × 18 in (450 mm) torpedo tubes

HMS Shark was one of three Rocket-class destroyers built for the Royal Navy in the 1890s. Completed in 1895 she served in home waters and was sold for scrap in 1911.

== Description ==
Ordered as part of the 1893–1894 Naval Programme, the Rocket-class torpedo boat destroyers were J & G Thompson's first such ships. They displaced 280 long tons (280 t) at normal load and 325 long tons (330 t) at deep load. The ships had an overall length of 203 feet 9 inches (62.1 m), a beam of 19 feet 6 inches (5.9 m) and a draught of 6 feet 9 inches (2.1 m). They were powered by a pair of triple-expansion steam engines, each driving a single propeller shaft using steam provided by four Normand boilers. The engines developed a total of 4,100 indicated horsepower (3,100 kW) and were intended to give a maximum speed of 27 knots (50 km/h; 31 mph). During her sea trials Shark reached 27.5 knots (50.9 km/h; 31.6 mph) from 4,188 ihp (3,123 kW). The Rocket-class ships carried a maximum of 75 long tons (76 t) of coal that gave them a range of 1,445 nautical miles (2,676 km; 1,663 mi) at 11 knots (20 km/h; 13 mph). Their crew numbered 53 officers and ratings.

The ships were armed with a single quick-firing (QF) 12-pounder (3 in (76 mm) Mk I gun and five QF 6-pounder (2.2 in (57 mm)) Mk I Hotchkiss guns in single mounts. Their torpedo armament consisted of two rotating torpedo tubes for 18-inch (450 mm) torpedoes, one mount amidships and the other on the stern.

== Construction and career ==
Shark was laid down by J & G Thompson at its Clydebank shipyard on 14 February 1894, launched on 22 September and completed in July 1895. Shark served in the Channel Squadron in home waters throughout her career. She was assigned to the Devonport instructional flotilla, when she was transferred in early February 1900 to become tender to HMS Cambridge, gunnery school ship off Plymouth. She took part in the Coronation Review for King Edward VII on 16 August 1902, with lieutenant A. S. Susmann temporarily in command from 8 August. The following month she was replaced as tender on 11 September and paid off into the D Division of the Devonport Fleet Reserve.

Two seamen were killed and injured in an accident on board the Shark while arriving at Portsmouth in February 1903.

Shark was sold for scrap at Devonport for £1575 on 11 July 1911.

== Bibliography ==
- Chesneau, Roger & Kolesnik, Eugene M, eds. (1979). Conway's All The World's Fighting Ships 1860–1905. London: Conway Maritime Press. ISBN 0-85177-133-5.
- Colledge, J. J.; Warlow, Ben (2006) [1969]. Ships of the Royal Navy: The Complete Record of All Fighting Ships of the Royal Navy from the 15th Century to the Present (3rd Rev ed.). London: Chatham Publishing. ISBN 978-1-86176-281-8. OCLC 67375475.
- Friedman, Norman (2009). British Destroyers: From Earliest Days to the Second World War. Barnsley, UK: Seaforth Publishing. ISBN 978-1-84832-049-9.
- Gardiner, Robert & Gray, Randal, eds. (1985). Conway's All The World's Fighting Ships 1906–1921. London: Conway Maritime Press. ISBN 0-85177-245-5.
- Johnston, Ian (2015). Ships for All Nations: John Brown & Company Clydebank 1847–1971 (2nd ed.). Annapolis, Maryland: Naval Institute Press. ISBN 978-1-59114-584-4.
- Lyon, David (2001) [1996]. The First Destroyers. London: Caxton Editions. ISBN 1-84067-3648.
- Manning, T. D. (1961). The British Destroyer. London: Putnam & Co.
- March, Edgar J. (1966). British Destroyers: A History of Development, 1892–1953; Drawn by Admiralty Permission From Official Records & Returns, Ships' Covers & Building Plans. London: Seeley Service. OCLC 164893555.*March, Edgar J. (1966). British Destroyers: A History of Development, 1892–1953; Drawn by Admiralty Permission From Official Records & Returns, Ships' Covers & Building Plans. London: Seeley Service. OCLC 164893555.
