= Sturgeon-class destroyer =

Subclass of the A-class destroyers

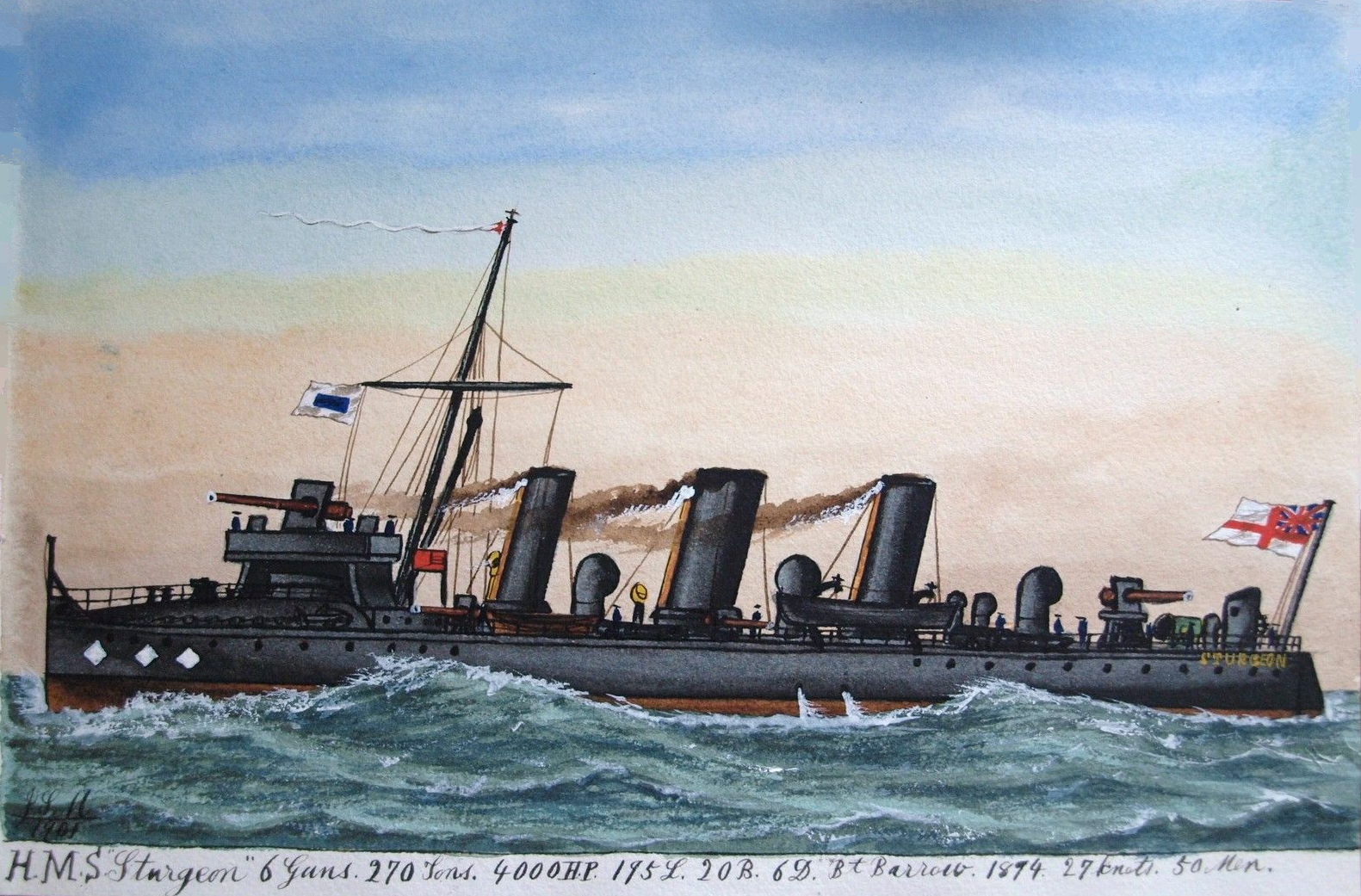
- A watercolour of Sturgeon c. 1901

Class overview
- Name: Sturgeon class
- Builders: Vickers
- Operators: Royal Navy
- Preceded by: Rocket class
- Succeeded by: Swordfish class
- Built: 1894–1895
- In commission: 1894–1911
- Completed: 3
- Scrapped: 3

General characteristics
- Type: Torpedo boat destroyer
- Propulsion: Blechynden boilers, 4,000 hp (2,983 kW)
- Speed: 27 knots (50 km/h; 31 mph)
- Complement: 53
- Armament: 1 × 12 pounder gun; 2 × torpedo tubes

The Sturgeon-class destroyers served with the Royal Navy from 1894; three were built by the Vickers yard and differed from other similar ships in having their mast stepped before the first funnel. They had Blechynden boilers which gave them 4,000 hp (3,000 kW) and 27 knots (50 km/h; 31 mph). They were armed with one twelve pounder and two torpedo tubes. They carried a complement of 53 officers and men.

== Construction and design ==
On 8 November 1893, the British Admiralty placed an order with the Naval Construction and Armament Company of Barrow-in-Furness (later to become part of Vickers) for three "Twenty-Seven Knotter" destroyers as part of the 1893–1894 construction programme for the Royal Navy, with in total, 36 destroyers being ordered from various shipbuilders for this programme.

The Admiralty only laid down a series of broad requirements for the destroyers, leaving detailed design to the ships' builders. The requirements included a trial speed of 27 knots (31 mph; 50 km/h), a "turtleback" forecastle and a standard armament of a QF 12 pounder 12 cwt (3 in (76 mm) calibre) gun on a platform on the ship's conning tower (in practice the platform was also used as the ship's bridge), with a secondary armament of five 6-pounder guns, and two 18 inch (450 mm) torpedo tubes.

The Naval Construction and Armament Company produced a design with a length of 194 feet 6 inches (59.28 m) overall and 190 feet (57.91 m) between perpendiculars, with a beam of 19 feet (5.79 m) and a draught of 7 feet 7 inches (2.31 m). Displacement was 300 long tons (300 t) light and 340 long tons (350 t) deep load. Three funnels were fitted, with the foremast between the ship's bridge and the first funnel. Four Blechyndnen water-tube boilers fed steam at 200 pounds per square inch (1,400 kPa) to two three-cylinder triple expansion steam engines rated at 4,000 indicated horsepower (3,000 kW). 60 tons of coal were carried, giving a range of 1,370 nautical miles (2,540 km; 1,580 mi) at a speed of 11 knots (20 km/h; 13 mph). The ship's crew was 53 officers and men.

All three ships had been sold for scrapping before 1913 when the Admiralty re-classed the surviving 27-knotter destroyers as A Class destroyers.

== See also ==
- A-class destroyer (1913)

== Ships ==
- Sturgeon
- Starfish
- Skate
