= List of destroyer classes of the Royal Navy =

This is a list of destroyer classes of the Royal Navy of the United Kingdom, organised chronologically by entry into service.

== Torpedo boat destroyers ==
In 1913, the surviving members of the large heterogeneous array of older 27-knot and 30-knot torpedo boat destroyer types (all six of the original 26-knot ships had been disposed of by the end of 1912) were organised into the A, B, C and D classes according to their design speed and the number of funnels they possessed. All were of a "turtle-back" design and, excepting a few "builder's specials", powered by reciprocating engines. It should be stressed that these A to D class designations did not exist before 1913, and only applied to those "turtle-backed" destroyers surviving to that time.

- "26-knotter" types
  - Daring class: 2 ships, 1893–1894
  - Havock class: 2 ships, 1893
  - Ferret class: 2 ships, 1893–1894
- A class; (27-knot classes)
  - Ardent class: 3 ships, 1894–1895
  - Charger class: 3 ships, 1894
  - Rocket class: 3 ships, 1894
  - Hardy class: 2 ships, 1895
  - Conflict class: 3 ships, 1894–1895
  - Fervent class: 2 ships, 1895
  - Janus class: 3 ships, 1895
  - Sturgeon class: 3 ships, 1894–1895
  - Salmon class: 2 ships, 1895
  - Swordfish class: 2 ships, 1895
  - Banshee class: 3 ships, 1894
  - Handy class: 3 ships, 1895
  - Sunfish class: 3 ships, 1895
  - Zebra class: 1 ship, 1895
- B class (4-funnelled, 30-knot classes)
  - Quail class: 4 ships, 1895
  - Earnest class: 6 ships, 1896–1897
  - Spiteful class: 2 ships, 1899
  - Myrmidon class: 2 ships, 1900
- C class (3-funnelled, 30-knot classes)
  - Star class: 6 ships, 1896–1897
  - Avon class: 3 ships, 1896–1897
  - Brazen class: 4 ships, 1896–1898
  - Violet class: 2 ships, 1897
  - Mermaid class: 2 ships, 1897–1898
  - Gipsy class: 3 ships, 1897
  - Bullfinch class: 3 ships, 1898
  - Fawn class: 6 ships, 1897–1899
  - Falcon class: 2 ships, 1899–1900
  - Greyhound class: 3 ships, 1900–1901
  - Thorn class: 3 ships, purchased 1901
  - Hawthorn special type: 2 ships, 1899, steam turbine specials
  - Thornycroft special: 1 ship, 1898
  - Armstrong-Whitworth special,: 1 ship, 1900
- D class; (2-funnelled, 30-knot classes) Unlike the A, B and C classes, the D class comprised a series of similar ships built by one contractor (Thornycroft), although there were small variations between the batches ordered in each year.
  - 1893-94 Programme: 4 ships, 1896
  - 1894-95 Programme: 2 ships, 1897
  - 1895-96 Programme: 3 ships, 1897–1898
  - 1896-97 Programme (special type): 1 ship, 1899
- Taku: 1 ship, 1900, ex-Chinese prize

== Conventional destroyers ==
In 1913, lettered names were given to all Royal Navy destroyers, previously known after the first ship of that class. The River or E class of 1913 were the first destroyers of the Royal Navy with a high forecastles instead of "turtleback" bow making this the first class with a more recognizable modern configuration.

- River or E class: 36 ships, 1903–1905 (including 2 later purchases)
- Cricket-class coastal destroyer: 36 ships, 1906–1909
- Tribal or F class: 13 ships, 1907–1909
- Beagle or G class: 16 ships, 1909–1910
- Acorn or H class: 20 ships, 1910–1911
- Acheron or I class: 23 ships, 1910–1915
- Acasta or K class: 20 ships, 1912–1913
- Swift type: 1 ship, 1907, large 36-knot flotilla leader prototype
- Laforey or L class: 22 ships, 1913–1915
- Arno type: 1 ship, 1914, Italian built for Portugal but purchased in 1915
- Admiralty M class: 74 ships, 1914–1917
- Hawthorn M class: 2 ships, 1915
- Yarrow M class: 10 ships, 1914–1916
- Thornycroft M class: 6 ships, 1914–1916
- Talisman class: 4 ships, 1914–1916, ex-Turkish purchases
- Medea class : 4 ships, 1915, ex-Greek purchases
- Faulknor-class leader: 4 ships, 1914, ex-Chilean purchases
- Marksman-class leader: 7 ships, 1915–1916
- Parker-class leader: 6 ships, 1916–1917
- Admiralty R class: 39 ships, 1916–1917
- Yarrow Later M class: 7 ships, 1916–1917
- Thornycroft R class: 5 ships, 1916–1917
- Admiralty modified R class: 11 ships, 1916–1917
- Admiralty S class: 55 ships, 1918–1924
- Yarrow S class: 7 ships, 1918–1919
- Thornycroft S class: 5 ships, 1918–1919
- Admiralty V class: 28 ships, 1916–1918
- Admiralty W class: 19 ships, 1916–1918
- Thornycroft V and W class: 4 ships, 1918
- Thornycroft modified W class: 2 ships, 1918–1924
- Admiralty modified W class: 15 ships, 1918–1922
- Admiralty type flotilla leader: 8 ships, 1917–1919
- Thornycroft type leader or Shakespeare class: 5 ships, 1917–1921

=== Inter-war standard classes ===
- Ambuscade type: 1 ship, 1926, Yarrow prototype of new design.
- Amazon type: 1 ship, 1926, Thornycroft prototype of new design.
  - A class: 9 ships, 1928–1931
  - B class: 9 ships, 1929–1931
  - C class: 5 ships, 1930–1934
  - D class: 9 ships, 1931–1933
  - E class: 9 ships, 1933–1934
  - F class: 9 ships, 1933–1935
  - G class: 9 ships, 1934–1936
  - H class: 9 ships, 1935–1937
    - ex-Brazilian H class: 6 ships, 1938–1940, ex-Brazilian purchases
  - I class: 9 ships, 1936–1937
    - ex-Turkish I class: 2 ships, 1939–1941, ex-Turkish purchases
- Tribal class: 27 ships, 1936–1944
- J, K and N class: 24 ships, 1938–1941
- Hunt class: 86 ships (20 Type I, 36 Type II, 28 Type III, 2 Type IV), 1939–1942, "escort destroyers"
- L and M class: 16 ships, 1939–42
- Town class: 50 ships from three classes of United States Navy destroyers, built 1917–1920, transferred 1940

=== World War II War Emergency Programme destroyers ===
The following were ordered as part of the War Emergency Programme classes:

- O and P class: 16 ships, 1941–1942
- Q and R class: 16 ships, 1941–1942
- S and T class: 16 ships, 1942–1943
- U and V class: 16 ships, 1942–1943
- W and Z class: 16 ships, 1943–1944
- C class: 32 ships, (8 Ca-, 8 Ch-, 8 Co-, 8 Cr-), 1943–1945
- Battle class: 23 ships (16 Group I, 7 Group II), 1943–1946
- Weapon class: 4 ships, 1945–1946
- G class: 0 ships (8 cancelled), 1944

=== Post-war all-gun design ===
- Daring class: 8 ships, 1949–1952

== Guided-missile destroyers ==
- County class: 8 ships (4 Batch I, 4 Batch II), 1961–1967
- Type 82: 1 ship (Bristol, 1969) built to trial technology. Eight originally planned to operate with cancelled CVA-01 aircraft carriers.
- Type 42: 14 ships (6 Sheffield, 4 Exeter, 4 Manchester), 1971–1983
- Type 43: project cancelled at feasibility stage in 1981 Defence White Paper
- Type 44: Subclass of Type 43 with better anti-submarine capability.
- Type 45: 6 ships, all commissioned between 2009 and 2013. It is the final destroyer class made for the Royal Navy.
- Type 83: The project is cancelled. It was planned to replace Type 45 in 2030s by the class.

== See also ==
- List of destroyer classes

== Bibliography ==
- Friedman, Norman (2008). British Destroyers & Frigates: The Second World War and After. Barnsley, UK: Seaforth Publishing. ISBN 978-1-84832-015-4.
- Friedman, Norman (2009). British Destroyers From Earliest Days to the Second World War. Annapolis, Maryland: Naval Institute Press. ISBN 978-1-59114-081-8.
