= HMS Tiger (1900) =

Destroyer of the Royal Navy

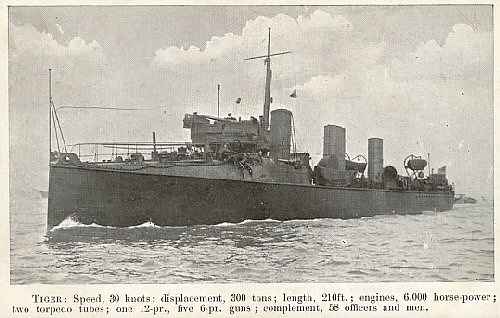
- Tiger

History

United Kingdom
- Name: HMS Tiger
- Builder: John Brown & Company, Clydebank
- Launched: 19 May 1900
- Commissioned: 21 August 1901
- Fate: Sunk by collision with HMS Berwick, 2 April 1908

General characteristics
- Class & type: Clydebank three funnel - 30 knot destroyer
- Displacement: 380 long tons (386 t) light; 425 long tons (432 t) full load
- Length: 222 ft (67.7 m) o/a
- Beam: 20 ft 6 in (6.25 m)
- Draught: 8 ft 11 in (2.72 m)
- Installed power: 4 × Normand water-tube boilers; 6,400 ihp (4,800 kW)
- Propulsion: 2 Shafts; 2 × Vertical triple-expansion steam engines
- Speed: 30 knots (56 km/h; 35 mph)
- Complement: 63 officers and men
- Armament: 1 × QF 12-pounder 12 cwt Mark I gun; 5 × QF 6-pdr 8 cwt; 2 × single tubes for 18-inch (450 mm) torpedoes

HMS Tiger was a torpedo boat destroyer of the Royal Navy. Built by John Brown on Clydebank as a three funnel 30-knot destroyer on speculation, she was purchased by the Royal Navy under the 1899–1900 Naval Estimates.

In 1908, she collided with the armoured cruiser HMS Berwick during a night exercise and sank.

== Construction ==
On 31 March 1900, as part of the 1899–1900 construction programme for the Royal Navy, the British Admiralty purchased three destroyers that were being built by the Clydebank shipbuilder John Brown and Company as speculative builds, yard numbers 334, 335 and 336 (to become Thorn, Tiger and Vigilant respectively). The three ships closely resembled Kestrel, built by the shipbuilder as part of the 1896–1897 programme. They had an overall length of 222 feet (67.7 m) and a length between perpendiculars of 218 feet (66.4 m), with a beam of 20 feet 6 inches (6.25 m) and a draught of 8 feet 11 inches (2.72 m). Displacement was 380 long tons (390 t) light and 425 long tons (432 t) full load. Four Normand boilers fed steam at 230 pounds per square inch (1,600 kPa) to triple expansion steam engines rated at 6,400 indicated horsepower (4,800 kW) and driving two propeller shafts. Three funnels were fitted.

The ships were required to reach a speed of 30 knots (56 km/h; 35 mph) during sea trials and carry an armament of a single QF 12 pounder 12 cwt (3 in (76 mm) calibre) gun, backed up by five 6-pounder guns, and two 18-inch (450 mm) torpedo tubes. An arched turtleback forecastle was fitted. The ship had a crew of 63 officers and ratings.

Tiger was launched on 19 May 1900. The ship was completed and accepted by the Royal Navy in June 1901.

== Service ==
Tiger took part in the 1901 Naval Manoeuvres, and was paid off at Devonport on 15 August 1901. She recommissioned at Devonport 21 August 1901, and assigned to the Portsmouth Flotilla of the Home Fleet. She spent her entire operational career in Home Waters. Tiger was paid off on 4 January 1902, when her crew was turned over to HMS Ostrich, which took her place in the Flotilla.

On the night of 25 September 1907, Tiger ran aground on the breakwater of Portland Harbour tearing off a large length of the ship's keel and holing the ship.

On 2 April 1908 Tiger took part in a Home Fleet exercise in the English Channel 18 miles (29 km) south of the Isle of Wight. Part of the exercise was to test fleet defence against a torpedo boat night attack, with all ships running without lights. Tiger and Recruit were carrying out a mock torpedo attack when Tiger crossed the bow of Berwick, an armoured cruiser. Tiger was cut in two with the forward section sinking almost immediately. The stern remained afloat long enough for 22 members of her crew to be rescued, but 36 men, including Tiger's captain, Lieutenant W. E. Middleton, were lost.

In August 2026, it was announced that divers from ProjectXplore had found the wreck of Tiger off the Isle of Wight.

== Bibliography ==
- Chesneau, Roger & Kolesnik, Eugene M., eds. (1979). Conway's All The World's Fighting Ships 1860–1905. London: Conway Maritime Press. ISBN 0-85177-133-5.
- Colledge, J. J.; Warlow, Ben (2006) [1969]. Ships of the Royal Navy: The Complete Record of All Fighting Ships of the Royal Navy from the 15th Century to the Present (3rd Rev ed.). London: Chatham Publishing. ISBN 978-1-86176-281-8. OCLC 67375475.
- Dittmar, F. J.; Colledge, J. J. (1972). British Warships 1914–1919. Shepperton, UK: Ian Allan. ISBN 0-7110-0380-7.
- Friedman, Norman (2009). British Destroyers: From Earliest Days to the Second World War. Barnsley, UK: Seaforth Publishing. ISBN 978-1-84832-049-9.
- Gardiner, Robert & Gray, Randal, eds. (1985). Conway's All The World's Fighting Ships 1906–1921. London: Conway Maritime Press. ISBN 0-85177-245-5.
- Kemp, Paul (1999). The Admiralty Regrets: British Warship Losses of the 20th Century. Stroud, UK: Sutton Publishing. ISBN 0-7509-1567-6.
- Lyon, David (2001) [1996]. The First Destroyers. London: Caxton Editions. ISBN 1-84067-3648.
- Manning, T. D. (1961). The British Destroyer. London: Putnam & Co. OCLC 6470051.
- March, Edgar J. (1966). British Destroyers: A History of Development, 1892–1953; Drawn by Admiralty Permission From Official Records & Returns, Ships' Covers & Building Plans. London: Seeley Service. OCLC 164893555.
