= List of ship launches in 1896 =

The list of ship launches in 1896 includes a chronological list of some ships launched in 1896.

Date	Ship	Class / type	Builder	Location	Country	Notes
28 February	Polycarp	Cargo ship	Barclay Curle	Glasgow	United Kingdom	For Booth Steamship Company
29 February	Iran	Cargo ship	Harland & Wolff	Belfast	United Kingdom	For Edward Bates & Son.
9 March	Oden	Oden-class coastal defence ship	Bergsunds Shipyard	Stockholm	Sweden	
13 March	Ebani	Cargo ship	William Gray & Company	West Hartlepool	United Kingdom	For African Association Ltd
14 March	Istrar	Cargo ship	Harland & Wolff	Belfast	United Kingdom	For Edward Bates & Son.
28 March	Iowa	Pre-dreadnought battleship	William Cramp & Sons	Philadelphia, Pennsylvania	United States	
30 March	Mars	Majestic-class battleship	Laird, Son & Co	Birkenhead	United Kingdom	
9 April	Ibadan	Cargo ship	David J. Dunlop & Co.	Port Glasgow	United Kingdom	For African Steamship Company
27 April	Bouvet	Pre-dreadnought battleship	Arsenal de Lorient	Lorient	France	
27 April	Perseverance	Tug	Allsup & Co. Ltd.	Preston	United Kingdom	For Mayor, Aldermen & Burgesses of the Borough of Preston.
28 April	Hannibal	Majestic-class battleship	Pembroke Dock	Wales	United Kingdom	
30 April	Rossia	Armored cruiser	Baltic Works	Saint Petersburg	Russia	
30 April	Sussex	Passenger ferry	William Denny & Bros Ltd	Dumbarton	United Kingdom	For London, Brighton and South Coast Railway
14 May	Canada	Passenger ship	Harland & Wolff	Belfast	United Kingdom	For Dominion Line.
27 May	Cassard	D'Assas-class cruiser	Arsenal de Cherbourg	Cherbourg	France	For French Navy.
9 June	Comic	Ferry	Harland & Wolff	Belfast	United Kingdom	For Belfast Steamship Co.
		Cargo ship	Harland & Wolff	Belfast	United Kingdom	For
12 June	D'Entrecasteaux	First class cruiser	Forges et Chantiers de la Méditerranée	La Seyne	France	For French Navy
13 June	China	Passenger ship	Harland & Wolff	Belfast	United Kingdom	For Peninsular & Oriental Steam Navigation Company.
1 July	Kaiser Friedrich III	Kaiser Friedrich III-class battleship	Kaiserliche Werft	Wilhelmshaven	Germany	
9 July	European	Cargo liner	Harland & Wolff	Belfast	United Kingdom	For West India & Pacific Steamship Company
14 July	Electra	Brazen-class destroyer	John Brown & Company	Clydebank, Scotland	United Kingdom	
7 August	Furor	Furor-class destroyer	James and George Thomson	Clydebank	United Kingdom	For Spanish Navy
10 August	Terror	Furor-class destroyer	James and George Thomson	Clydebank	United Kingdom	For Spanish Navy
14 August	Ilorin	Cargo ship	David J. Dunlop & Co.	Port Glasgow	United Kingdom	For African Steamship Company
25 August	Gascon	Passenger ship	Harland & Wolff	Belfast	United Kingdom	For Union Steamship Line.
2 September	Caesar	Majestic-class battleship	Portsmouth Dockyard	Portsmouth	United Kingdom	
2 September	Saint Louis	Charlemagne-class battleship	Arsenal de Lorient	Lorient	France	
2 September	Rostislav	Pre-dreadnought battleship	Nikolayev shipyard	Mykolaiv	Russia	
10 September	Pennsylvania	Passenger ship	Harland & Wolff	Belfast	United Kingdom	For Holland America Line
17 September	Illustrious	Majestic-class battleship	Chatham Dockyard	Chatham, Kent	United Kingdom	
22 September	Gaika	Passenger ship	Harland & Wolff	Belfast	United Kingdom	For Union Steamship Line.
6 October	Gaulois	Charlemagne-class battleship	Arsenal de Brest	Brest	France	
7 October	Bat	Star-class destroyer	Palmers Shipbuilding and Iron Company	Jarrow	United Kingdom	
8 October	Arcadia	Cargo ship	Harland & Wolff	Belfast	United Kingdom	For Hamburg America Line.
8 October	Ardova	Steamship	Blyth Shipbuilding Co. Ltd	Blyth	United Kingdom	For Ardova Steamship Co. Ltd.
8 October	Catinat	Catinat-class cruiser	Société Nouvelle des Forges et Chantiers de la Méditerranée	La Seyne	France	For French Navy.
17 October	Princesa de Asturias	Princesa de Asturias-class armored cruiser	Arsenal de La Carraca	San Fernando	Spain	For Spanish Navy.
21 October	Diadem	Diadem-class cruiser	Fairfield Shipbuilding and Engineering Company	Govan, Scotland	United Kingdom	For Royal Navy.
17 November	Dresden	Passenger steamer	Earle's Shipbuilding	Hull	United Kingdom	For Great Eastern Railway
21 November	Arabia	Cargo ship	Harland & Wolff	Belfast	United Kingdom	For Hamburg America Line.
3 December	Furious	Arrogant-class cruiser	Portsmouth Dockyard	Portsmouth	United Kingdom	
4 December	New Orleans	Protected cruiser	Armstrong, Mitchell and Company	Newcastle upon Tyne	United Kingdom	Laid down for Brazilian Navy, purchased by United States Navy
5 December	Locust	Earnest-class destroyer	Laird, Son & Co.	Birkenhead	United Kingdom	
5 December	Newport	Gunboat		Bath, Maine	United States	
5 December	Oravia	Passenger ship	Harland & Wolff	Belfast	United Kingdom	For Pacific Steam Navigation Company.
5 December	Proserpine	Pelorus-class cruiser	Sheerness Dockyard	Sheerness, Kent	United Kingdom	
5 December	Vicksburg	Gunboat		Bath, Maine	United States	
8 December	Gladiator	Arrogant-class cruiser	Portsmouth Dockyard	Portsmouth	United Kingdom	
17 December	City of York	Trawler	Mackie & Thomson	Govan	United Kingdom	For Hagerup Doughty & Co. Ltd
17 December	City of Glasgow	Trawler	Mackie & Thomson	Govan	United Kingdom	For Hagerup Doughty & Co. Ltd
21 December	Pactolus	Pelorus-class cruiser	Armstrong, Mitchell and Company	Newcastle-upon-Tyne	United Kingdom	
23 December	Annapolis	Gunboat	Crescent Shipyard	Elizabeth, New Jersey	United States	
Unknown date	Britannia	Paddle steamer	Ailsa Shipbuilding Co Ltd.	Troon	United Kingdom	For P. & A. Campbell.
Unknown date	Alesia	steamship			Germany	Given to the United Kingdom after World War I
Unknown date	Fortuna	Lighter	Brown & Clapson	Barton-upon-Humber	United Kingdom	For A. Willoughby.
Unknown date	Juno	Sloop	Brown & Clapson	Barton-upon-Humber	United Kingdom	For George Hill.
Unknown date	Lilian	Sloop	Brown & Clapson	Barton-upon-Humber	United Kingdom	For William Aaron.
Unknown date	Lord Nelson	Paddle steamer	Allsup & Co. Ltd.	Preston	United Kingdom	For Great Yarmouth Steam Tug Co. Ltd.
Unknown date	Milton	Steam drifter	Beeching Brothers Ltd.	Great Yarmouth	United Kingdom	For Horatio Fenner Ltd.
Unknown date	Sarah Ellen	Sloop	Brown & Clapson	Barton-upon-Humber	United Kingdom	For Benjamin Barraclough & William Barraclough.
Unknown date	Stella	Merchantman	Allsup & Co. Ltd.	Preston	United Kingdom	For private owner.
Unknown date	Vixen	Tug	Allsup & Co. Ltd.	Preston	United Kingdom	For T. W. Fox.
