= HMS Otter =

Twelve ships of the Royal Navy have been named HMS Otter, for the otter.

- HMS Otter (1700) was a 4-gun ketch launched in 1700 and captured by the French in 1702.
- HMS Otter (1709) was a 14-gun sixth rate launched in 1709 and sold in 1713.
- HMS Otter (1721) was an 8-gun sloop launched in 1721 and wrecked in 1741.
- HMS Otter (1742) was a 14-gun sloop launched in 1742 and sold in 1763.
- HMS Otter (1767) was a 14-gun sloop launched in 1767 and wrecked in 1778.
- HMS Otter (1778) was a 14-gun sloop, the former French merchantman Glanure, that the royal Navy captured in 1778 and sold in 1783. She then became the merchantman and slave ship Cyclops. The French captured her in December 1795 as she was delivering her third cargo of slaves to the West Indies.
- HMS Otter (1782) was a 14-gun brig-sloop launched in 1782. She was converted to a fireship in 1800 and was sold in 1801.
- HMS Otter (1805) was an 18-gun sloop launched in 1805. She was used for harbour service from 1814 and was sold in 1828.
- HMS Otter (1837) was a wooden paddle packet, previously the GPO vessel Wizard. She was transferred to the Royal Navy in 1837, became a gunvessel in 1854, a tug in 1865, a coal hulk in 1878 and was sold in 1893.
- HMQS Otter was a screw gunboat launched in 1884. She served with the Queensland Maritime Defence Force and Commonwealth Naval Forces and was sold in 1906. She was later rehired by the Royal Australian Navy as HMAS Otter.
- HMS Otter (1896) was an Avon-class destroyer launched in 1896 and sold in 1916.
- HMS Otter (S15) was an Oberon-class submarine launched in 1962 and sold in 1992.

== See also ==
- USS Otter (DE-210), a Buckley-class destroyer escort of the United States Navy
