= HMS Leopard (1897) =

Destroyer of the Royal Navy

History

United Kingdom
- Name: HMS Leopard
- Ordered: 1895 – 1896 Naval Estimates
- Builder: Barrow Shipbuilding Company and Vickers, Sons and Maxim, Barrow-in-Furness
- Laid down: 10 June 1896
- Launched: 20 March 1897
- Commissioned: July 1899
- Out of service: Laid up in reserve 1919
- Fate: 10 June 1919 sold to J. Jackson for breaking

General characteristics
- Class & type: Vickers three funnel - 30 knot destroyer
- Displacement: 350 long tons (356 t) standard; 400 long tons (406 t) full load; 214 ft 3 in (65.30 m) o/a; 20 ft (6.1 m) Beam; 8 ft 3 in (2.51 m) Draught
- Propulsion: 4 × Thornycroft water tube boiler; 2 × Vertical Triple Expansion (VTE) steam engines, 2 shafts; 6,300 ihp (4,700 kW)
- Speed: 30 kn (56 km/h)
- Range: 70 tons coal; 1,440 nmi (2,670 km) at 11 kn (20 km/h)
- Complement: 63 officers and men
- Armament: 1 × QF 12-pounder 12 cwt Mark I gun; 5 × QF 6-pdr 8 cwt naval gun guns; 2 × single tubes for 18-inch (450mm) torpedoes

Service record
- Operations: World War I 1914 - 1918

HMS Leopard was a Vickers three funnel - 30 knot destroyer ordered by the Royal Navy under the 1895 – 1896 Naval Estimates. She was the ninth ship to carry this name since it was introduced in 1635 for a 34-gun ship, captured by the Dutch in 1653.

== Construction ==
Leopard was laid down as Yard Number 254 (Note: Sources differ as to when Leopard was ordered. Friedman states that the ship was ordered as part of the 1896–87 shipbuilding programme, but Lyon claims Leopard as part of the 1895–96 programme, stating that it is unlikely that she was ordered as part of the 1896–97 programme.) on 10 June 1896 at the Barrow Shipbuilding Company shipyard at Barrow-in-Furness and launched on 20 March 1897.

Leopard was 214 feet 3 inches (65.30 m) long overall and 210 feet (64.01 m) between perpendiculars, with a beam of 20 feet (6.10 m) and a draught of 8 feet 3 inches (2.51 m). Four Thornycroft boilers fed steam at 220 pounds per square inch (1,500 kPa) to two four-cylinder triple expansion steam engines rated at 6,300 indicated horsepower (4,700 kW) and driving two propeller shafts. Three funnels were fitted. Displacement was 350 long tons (360 t) light and 400 long tons (410 t) full load, slightly lighter than the three earlier Thirty-knotter destroyers ordered from Barrow as part of the 1895–96 programme (Avon, Bittern and Otter). Leopard was contractually required to maintain a speed of 30 knots (56 km/h; 35 mph) for a continuous run of three hours and over six consecutive measured miles during sea trials.

Armament was specified as a single QF 12 pounder 12 cwt (3 in (76 mm) calibre) gun on a platform on the ship's conning tower (in practice the platform was also used as the ship's bridge), backed up by five 6-pounder guns, and two 18-inch (450 mm) torpedo tubes. The ship's crew was 63 officers and men.

During her builder's trials she made her contracted speed requirement. In 1897 during the construction of these ships, the Barrow Shipbuilding Company was purchased by Vickers, Sons and Maxim and renamed as the Naval Construction and Armaments Shipyard. She was completed and accepted by the Royal Navy in July 1899.

== Service ==
=== Pre-war ===
Leopard was commissioned by Lieutenant Alan Everett Hudson on 15 January 1901, to serve as part of the Devonport Destroyer Instructional Flotilla, later that year participating in the 1901 British Naval Manoeuvres. The ship was slightly damaged in a collision with floating debris in January 1902, and was replaced in the Devonport Flotilla in March 1902. She underwent repairs to re-tube her boilers later that year, when she was refitted by Vickers, Sons and Maxim.

On 7 August 1906 Leopard collided with a buoy in the Hamoaze, but not before she hit the destroyer Kennet in trying to avoid the buoy. Leopard was holed below the waterline, requiring the ship to be docked for repair, while Kennet's rudder was damaged. Leopard had her boilers retubed again at Portsmouth Dockyard in July 1908, missing that year's Naval Manoeuvres. In 1910 Leopard formed part of the 5th Destroyer Flotilla, tendered to the depot ship Leander at Devonport, and was still part of that Flotilla in 1912. A reorganisation of the Royal Navy's destroyer force took place in 1912, with older destroyers, no longer suitable for fleet use, being used to equip Patrol Flotillas, with Leopard forming part of the 7th Flotilla at Devonport.

On 30 August 1912 the Admiralty directed all destroyers were to be grouped into classes designated by letters based on contract speed and appearance. As a three-funneled destroyer with a contract speed of 30 knots, Leopard was assigned to the C Class. The class letters were painted on the hull below the bridge area and on a funnel.

=== First World War ===
For the test mobilization in July 1914 she was assigned to the 7th Destroyer Flotilla based at Devonport tendered to Leander. At the outbreak of war, the 7th was redeployed to the Humber River. Her duties within the Humber Patrol were to prevent enemy ships from carrying out minelaying or torpedo attacks in the approaches to ports on the East coast, and to prevent raids by enemy ships.

On 3 November 1914, Leopard was taking part in a routine patrol off the Norfolk coast near the port of Yarmouth, as was the destroyer Lively and the torpedo gunboat Halcyon when Halcyon encountered a force of German battlecruisers and cruisers making a raid on Yarmouth. While all three British ships were heavily engaged by the German force, only Halcyon was hit before the Germans fired a few shells towards Yarmouth and retired. Leopard was undamaged.

Later in November 1914, Leopard was transferred to the Scapa Flow local defence flotilla. Leopard remained at Scapa Flow until January 1918, moving to the Firth of Forth in February 1918. Leopard returned to the 7th Flotilla, still based on the Humber, in May 1918, remaining there until the end of the war.

In 1919 she was paid off and laid-up in reserve awaiting disposal. She was sold on 10 June 1919 to J. Jackson for breaking.

== Pennant Numbers ==
Pennant Number	From	To
D75	6 Dec 1914	1 Sep 1915
D61	1 Sep 1915	1 Jan 1918
D50	1 Jan 1918	1 Apr 1918
H06	1 Apr 1918	10 Jun 1919

== Bibliography ==
- Brassey, T.A. (1902). The Naval Annual 1902. Portsmouth, UK: J. Griffin and Co.
- Chesneau, Roger & Kolesnik, Eugene M., eds. (1979). Conway's All The World's Fighting Ships 1860–1905. London: Conway Maritime Press. ISBN 0-85177-133-5.
- Colledge, J. J.; Warlow, Ben (2006) [1969]. Ships of the Royal Navy: The Complete Record of All Fighting Ships of the Royal Navy from the 15th Century to the Present (3rd Rev ed.). London: Chatham Publishing. ISBN 978-1-86176-281-8. OCLC 67375475.
- Corbett, Julian S. (1920). History of the Great War: Naval Operations: Vol. I: To the Battle of the Falklands December 1914. London: Longmans, Green and Co.
- Dittmar, F. J. & Colledge, J. J. (1972). British Warships 1914–1919. Shepperton, UK: Ian Allan. ISBN 0-7110-0380-7.
- Friedman, Norman (2009). British Destroyers: From Earliest Days to the Second World War. Barnsley, UK: Seaforth Publishing. ISBN 978-1-84832-049-9.
- Gardiner, Robert & Gray, Randal, eds. (1985). Conway's All The World's Fighting Ships 1906–1921. London: Conway Maritime Press. ISBN 0-85177-245-5.
- Hepper, David; Conway, Michael S. (June 2021). "Question 18/57". Warship International. LVIII (2): 100–101. ISSN 0043-0374.
- Jane, Fred T. (1969) [First published by Sampson Low Marston, London 1898]. Jane's All the World's Fighting Ships 1898. New York: Publishing Company.
- Jane, Fred T. (1969) [First published by Sampson Low & Marston: London, 1905]. Jane’s Fighting Ships 1905. New York: ARCO Publishing Company.
- Lyon, David (2001) [1996]. The First Destroyers. London: Caxton Editions. ISBN 1-84067-3648.
- Manning, T. D. (1961). The British Destroyer. London: Putnam & Co. OCLC 6470051.
- March, Edgar J. (1966). British Destroyers: A History of Development, 1892–1953; Drawn by Admiralty Permission From Official Records & Returns, Ships' Covers & Building Plans. London: Seeley Service. OCLC 164893555.
- Massie, Robert K. (2007). Castles of Steel: Britain, Germany and the Winning of the Great War at Sea. London: Vintage Books. ISBN 978-0-099-52378-9.
- Monograph No. 7: The Patrol Flotillas at the Commencement of the War (PDF). Naval Staff Monographs (Historical). Vol. III. The Naval Staff, Training and Staff Duties Division. 1921. pp. 71–107.
- Moore, John (1990). Jane's Fighting Ships of World War I. London: Studio Editions. ISBN 1-85170-378-0.
