= HMS Bat =

Destroyer of the Royal Navy

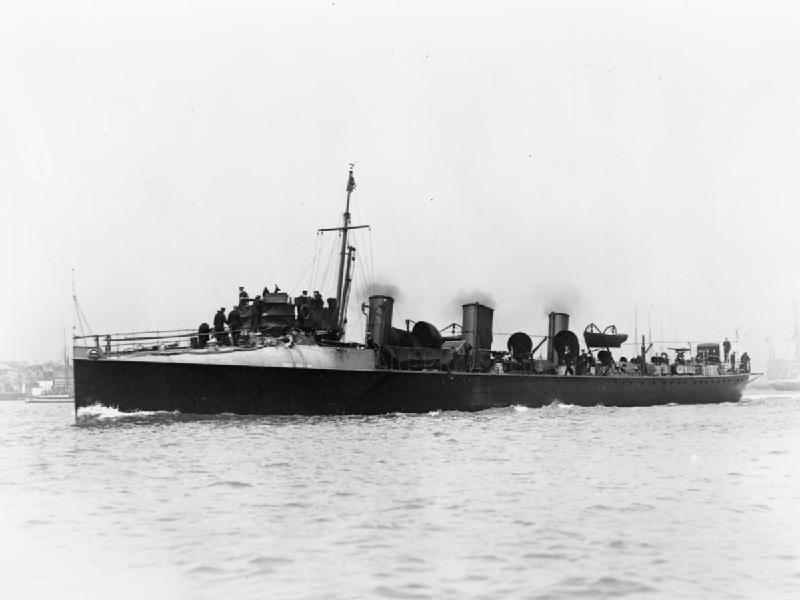
- HMS Bat

History

United Kingdom
- Name: Bat
- Ordered: 8 January 1896
- Builder: Palmers Shipbuilding and Iron Company, Jarrow
- Laid down: 28 May 1896
- Launched: 7 October 1896
- Commissioned: August 1897
- Out of service: Laid up in reserve, 1919
- Fate: Sold for breaking, 10 June 1919

General characteristics
- Class & type: Palmer three funnel - 30 knot destroyer
- Displacement: 390 long tons (396 t) light; 440 long tons (447 t) full load
- Length: 220 ft (67 m) o/a; 215 ft (66 m) pp
- Beam: 20 ft 9 in (6.32 m)
- Draught: 12 ft 5.5 in (3.797 m)
- Installed power: 6,200 ihp (4,600 kW)
- Propulsion: 4 × Reed water tube boilers; 2 × vertical triple-expansion steam engines; 2 shafts
- Speed: 30 kn (56 km/h)
- Complement: 63 officers and men
- Armament: 1 × QF 12-pounder 12 cwt Mark I L/40 naval gun on a P Mark I low angle mount; 5 × QF 6-pounder 8 cwt L/40 naval gun on a Mark I* low angle mount; 2 × single tubes for 18-inch (450mm) torpedoes

Service record
- Operations: World War I 1914–1918

HMS Bat was a Palmer-built three funnel, 30 knot torpedo boat destroyer ordered by the Royal Navy under the 1895 – 1896 Naval Estimates. She was the third ship to carry this name since it was introduced in 1815 for a revenue cutter in service until 1848. Bat was classified along with similar vessels as a C-class destroyer in 1913.

== Construction ==
HMS Bat was one of four 30-knotter destroyers (Bat, Chamois, Crane and Flying Fish) ordered from Palmer's of Jarrow-on-Tyne on 8 January 1896 as part of the 1895–1896 shipbuilding programme, following on from two destroyers (Star and Whiting) ordered from Palmer's on 23 December 1895 as part of the same programme.

Bat's hull was 220 feet (67.06 m) long overall and 215 feet (65.53 m) between perpendiculars, with a beam of 20 feet 9 inches (6.32 m) and a draught of 9 feet 9 inches (2.97 m). Four Reed water tube boilers fed steam at 250 pounds per square inch (1,700 kPa) to triple expansion steam engines rated at 6,200 indicated horsepower (4,600 kW) and driving two propeller shafts. Displacement was 390 long tons (400 t) light and 440 long tons (450 t) full load. Three funnels were fitted, and 91 tons of coal carried. Bat, like the other "thirty-knotters" was contractually required to maintain a speed of 30 knots (56 km/h; 35 mph) for a continuous run of three hours and over 6 consecutively measured runs of 1 mile (1.6 km) during sea trials.

Armament was specified as a single QF 12 pounder 12 cwt (3 in-calibre or 76 mm) gun on a platform on the ship's conning tower (in practice the platform was also used as the ship's bridge), backed up by five 6-pounder guns, and two 18-inch (450 mm) torpedo tubes. She had a crew of 60 to 63 officers and men.

Batwas laid down as Yard number 712 on 28 May 1896 at the Palmer shipyard at Jarrow and launched on 7 October 1896. The ship made an average speed of 30.2 kn (34.8 mph; 55.9 km/h) in a three-hour run during Sea trials on 17 July 1897. She was completed and accepted by the Royal Navy in August 1897.

== Service ==
=== Pre-War ===
After commissioning Bat was assigned to the 2nd Fleet and based at Devonport on training duties.

On 22 September 1897, Bat entered into the Fleet Reserve at Portsmouth. On 27 November 1897, Bat was commissioned at Portsmouth by the crew of the destroyer Thrasher for service with the Devonport Instructional Flotilla. In October 1898, the ship became the first destroyer in the Royal Navy to receive a torpedo fitted for a gyroscope.

In 1899 she was the leader of the Devonport Flotilla under the command of Commander Alexander Ludovic Duff during exercises in July. The following month she had her starboard propeller damaged while in Falmouth harbour, when the destroyer Fairy dragged her moorings and drifted into Bat and other ships of the flotilla. Following repairs in Devonport, she was to go back to the flotilla, but had to withdraw for a longer period as there was an accident in the engine-room during power trials in late February. She paid off into the Dockyard reserve at Devonport on 8 March 1900. Her commanding officer, from 1901, was Commander Roger Keyes, who pioneered new aggressive tactics for destroyers during this period. Bat was paid off on 4 January 1902, when her crew was turned over to the destroyer Falcon, which took her place in the flotilla. After paying off, she underwent repairs to re-tube her Reed boilers.

Bat was deployed to the Mediterranean between 1902 and 1905. On 2 September 1902 she commissioned at Devonport to join the Mediterranean Fleet. Arriving at Malta, she became tender to HMS Orion, depot ship for torpedo boats. In early January 1903 she took part in a three-weeks cruise with other ships of her squadron in the Greek islands around Corfu. On the night of 27 October 1904, Bat was in collision with the destroyer Panther off Gozo, with both ships having to return to Malta for repairs.

In 1910, Bat was part of the Fourth Destroyer Flotilla, based at Portsmouth and tendered to the depot ship Hecla. By March 1913, Bat was part of the Sixth Flotilla at Portsmouth, which was equipped with older destroyers for patrol purposes. The destroyer transferred to the Eighth Flotilla, based at Chatham in early 1914.

On 30 August 1912 the Admiralty directed all destroyer classes were to be designated by letters starting with 'A'. Since her design speed was 30 knots (56 km/h; 35 mph) and she had three funnels, she was assigned to the C class on 30 September 1913. The class letter 'C' was painted on the hull below the bridge area and on a funnel.

=== World War I ===
In July 1914 Bat was assigned to the 8th Destroyer Flotilla based at Chatham tendered to HMS Tyne. On the outbreak of war, the Eighth Flotilla was deployed to the Firth of Forth, carrying out patrol duties in support of the Grand Fleet. By January 1915, Bat, although still supported by Tyne, was attached to the Grand Fleet. She remained attached to the Grand Fleet through the rest of 1915 and 1916.

On 3 May 1917, Bat and the destroyer Ouse opened fire on the British submarine C10 off Blyth, Northumberland. Although one man was killed and a second was wounded, the submarine survived. In July 1917 Bat was redeployed to the East Coast Convoy Flotilla, this merging into the 7th Destroyer Flotilla based at the Humber the next month, continuing in escort operations for East coast convoys. She would remain there for the remainder of the war.

On 29 January 1918, Bat collided with the tug Guiana off Whitby, sinking the tug and killing four of Guiana's crew.

In 1919 Bat was paid off and laid-up in reserve awaiting disposal. She was sold on 30 August 1919 to Hayes of Porthcawl for breaking.

== Pennant numbers ==
| Pennant number | From | To |
|---|---|---|
| P97 | 6 Dec 1914 | 1 Sep 1915 |
| D46 | 1 Sep 1915 | 1 Jan 1918 |
| D09 | 1 Jan 1918 | 13 Sep 1918 |
| H87 | 13 Sep 1918 | - |
