= Star-class destroyer =

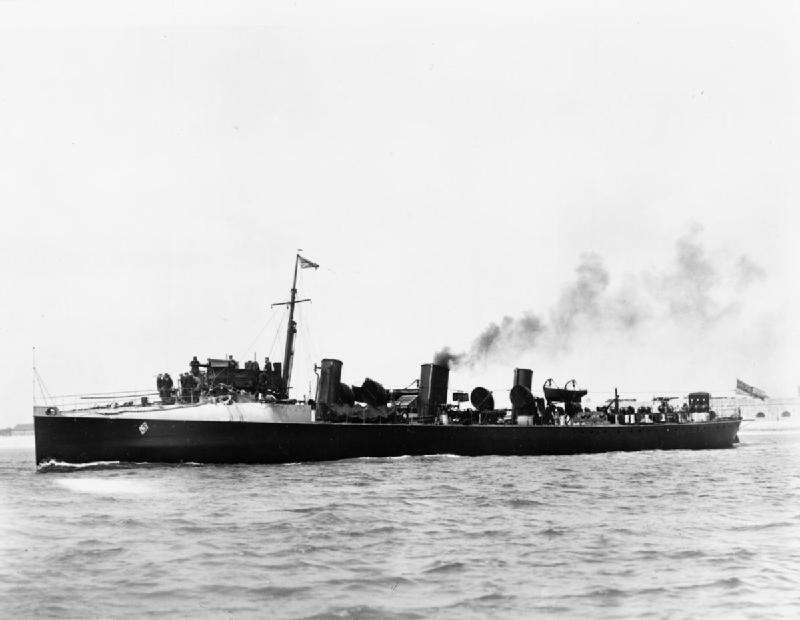
- HMS Chamois

Class overview
- Builders: Palmers Shipbuilding and Iron Company, Jarrow
- Operators: Royal Navy
- In commission: 1897–1919
- Completed: 8
- Lost: 1 in action; 1 to accident

General characteristics
- Type: Destroyer
- Displacement: 360 long tons (366 t)
- Length: 215 ft (66 m)
- Installed power: 5,900 hp (4,400 kW)
- Propulsion: Reed boilers
- Speed: 30 knots (56 km/h; 35 mph)
- Complement: 63
- Armament: 1 × 12-pounder gun; 2 × torpedo tubes

The Star-class destroyer was a class of eight destroyers that served in the British Royal Navy: Bat, Crane, Chamois, Fawn, Flirt, Flying Fish, Star and Whiting, were all three-funnelled C-class destroyers, as designated in the reorganisation of classes in 1913. Chamois foundered in 1904; the other ships served during the Great War and were broken up in 1919.

They were built by Palmer's Shipbuilding Company, were 215 feet long and displaced 360 tons. Their Reed boilers produced 5,900 hp (4,400 kW) which gave them 30 knots (56 km/h; 35 mph). They were armed, as was standard, with one 12-pounder gun and two torpedo tubes. They carried a complement of 63 officers and men. The boats had funnel caps and the steam pipes of the middle funnel were not in the centre line. They served in the Mediterranean and home waters.
