= Falcon-class destroyer =

The Falcon-class destroyers were a batch of three destroyers, built for the Royal Navy between 1899 and 1901 and serving in the First World War. The destroyers were sometimes referred to as the Falcon-class, after the lead ship of the batch HMS Falcon, however they were officially classified as part of the Gipsy-class.

== Ships ==
Name	Launched	Pennant	Fate
Falcon	P31 (6 Dec 1914-1 Sep 1915), D15 (1 Sep 1915-1 Jan 1918), D36(1 Jan 1918-1 Apr 1918)	29 December 1899	Collided with another vessel in 1918
Leven	28 June 1898	P33(6 Dec 1914-1 Sep 1915), D62(1 Sep 1915-1 Jan 1918), D51(1 Jan 1918-14 Sep 1920)	Sold for breaking, 14 September 1920
Ostrich	22 March 1900	P56(6 Dec 1914-1 Sep 1915), D65(1 Sep 1915-29 Apr 1920)	Sold for breaking, 29 April 1920

== See also ==
Gipsy-class destroyer

C-class destroyer (1913)

List of destroyer classes of the Royal Navy
