= Avon-class destroyer =

Avon-class destroyer was a class of three destroyers that served in the Royal Navy. These three funnelled 30 knot vessels were redesignated C-class destroyers in the reorganisation of 1913.

The three ships, Avon, Bittern and Otter, were built by Vickers at Barrow, were 210 feet long and their Normand boilers produced 6,300 HP and 30 knots. They were armed with the standard twelve pounder and two torpedo tubes. They carried a complement of 63 officers and men.
