= HMS Star (1896) =

Destroyer of the Royal Navy

History

United Kingdom
- Name: HMS Star
- Ordered: 1895–1896 Naval Estimates
- Builder: Palmers Shipbuilding and Iron Company, Jarrow-on-Tyne
- Laid down: 23 March 1896
- Launched: 11 August 1897
- Commissioned: September 1898
- Out of service: Laid up in reserve 1919
- Fate: Sold for breaking 10 June 1919

General characteristics
- Class & type: Palmer three-funnel, 30-knot destroyer
- Displacement: 390 long tons (400 t) light; 440 long tons (450 t) deep load
- Length: 220 ft (67.06 m) o/a
- Beam: 20 ft 9 in (6.32 m)
- Draught: 9 ft 9 in (2.97 m)
- Installed power: 6,200 ihp (4,600 kW)
- Propulsion: 4 × Reed water tube boilers; 2 × vertical triple-expansion steam engines; 2 shafts
- Speed: 30 kn (56 km/h)
- Range: 91 tons coal
- Complement: 58–63
- Armament: 1 × QF 12-pounder 12 cwt Mark I L/40 naval gun on a P Mark I low angle mount; 5 × QF 6-pdr 8 cwt L/40 naval gun on a Mark I low angle mount; 2 × single tubes for 18-inch (450 mm) torpedoes

Service record
- Operations: World War I 1914 - 1918

HMS Star was a Palmer three-funnel, 30-knot destroyer ordered by the Royal Navy under the 1896–1897 Naval Estimates. She was the eleventh ship to carry this name since it was introduced in 1643 for a 19-gun ship sold until 1652.

== Construction ==
On 23 December 1895, the Admiralty ordered two destroyers, Star and Whiting from Palmers Shipbuilding and Iron Company for the Royal Navy as part of the 1895–1896 shipbuilding programme, with four more destroyers ordered from Palmers on 9 January 1896.

Star's hull was 220 feet (67.06 m) long overall and 215 feet (65.53 m) between perpendiculars, with a beam of 20 feet 9 inches (6.32 m) and a draught of 9 feet 9 inches (2.97 m). Four Reed boilers fed steam at 250 pounds per square inch (1,700 kPa) to triple expansion steam engines rated at 6,200 indicated horsepower (4,600 kW) and driving two propeller shafts. Displacement was 390 long tons (400 t) light and 440 long tons (450 t) deep load. Three funnels were fitted, and 91 tons of coal carried. Star was contractually required to maintain a speed of 30 knots (56 km/h; 35 mph) for a continuous run of three hours and over six consecutive measured miles (9.7 km) during sea trials.

Armament was specified as a single QF 12-pounder 12 cwt (3 in calibre or 76 mm) gun on a platform on the ship's conning tower (in practice the platform was also used as the ship's bridge), backed up by five 6-pounder guns, and two 18-inch (450 mm) torpedo tubes.

Star was laid down on 23 March 1896, at the Palmer's Jarrow-on-Tyne shipyard as Yard Number 710, and launched on 11 August 1896. During her builder’s trials she made her contracted speed requirement, reaching 30.7 knots (56.9 km/h; 35.3 mph). She was completed and accepted by the Royal Navy in September 1898.

== Service history ==
=== Pre-War ===
Star was commanded by Lieutenant Bertram Sutton Evans as part of the Portsmouth instructional flotilla until she paid off at Portsmouth on 31 December 1900, when her crew turned over to HMS Electra. She was commissioned at Portsmouth on 27 August 1901 by Lieutenant Henry Willcox Osburn and assigned to the Portsmouth Flotilla of the Channel Fleet. The following year, Lieutenant James W. G. Innes was appointed in command from 1 March 1902, but the appointment was cancelled almost immediately when he received another posting. Star was subsequently used for experiments to test the rolling tendency of destroyers with a bilge keel. She was temporarily commissioned at Portsmouth on 12 October 1902 by Lieutenant Robert Wilberforce Myburgh and the crew of HMS Wizard, which was taken for repairs after a collision, but they were back on Wizard early the following month.

She spent her operational career mainly in Home Waters, although she did visit Gibraltar in 1905. In 1910, Star was a member of the 4th Destroyer Flotilla, based at Portsmouth, and was still a member of the 4th Flotilla in 1912, while in 1913 she was a member of the 6th Destroyer Flotilla, a local patrol flotilla also based at Portsmouth.

On 30 August 1912 the Admiralty directed all destroyers were to be grouped into classes designated by letters based on contract speed and appearance. As a three-funneled destroyer with a contract speed of 30 knots, Star was assigned to the C class. The class letters were painted on the hull below the bridge area and on a funnel.

=== World War I ===
For the test mobilization in July 1914 she was assigned to the 8th Destroyer Flotilla based at Chatham. Here Star provided local anti-submarine and counter-mining patrols.

In November 1916 she was redeployed to the 7th Destroyer Flotilla based at the Humber River. During her deployment there she was involved in anti-submarine and counter-mining patrols.

On 4 July 1918, the Norwegian barque Mentor was torpedoed by the German submarine SM UB-21 near Hartlepool. Star and Ostrich took part in the rescue of Mentor, which was towed to port, although too heavily damaged to be repaired. On 29 September 1918, the airship R29 spotted an oil slick, presumed to be from a German submarine, while escorting a convoy, and directed Star, Ouse and two armed trawlers to the site of the slick. The ships then proceeded to depth charge the submarine, UB-115. UB-115 sank 4.5 miles (7.2 km) North East from Beacon Point, Newton-by-the-Sea, with the loss of 39 officers and men.

In 1919 Star was paid off and laid-up in reserve awaiting disposal. The destroyer was sold on 23 July 1919 to Thos. W. Ward of Sheffield for breaking at New Holland, Lincolnshire, on the Humber Estuary.

== Pennant numbers ==
Pennant number	From	To
P07	6 December 1914	1 Sep 1915
D68	1 September 1915	1 Jan 1918
D79	1 January 1918	13 September 1918
H07	13 September 1918	-
