= HMS Kestrel (1898) =

Destroyer of the Royal Navy

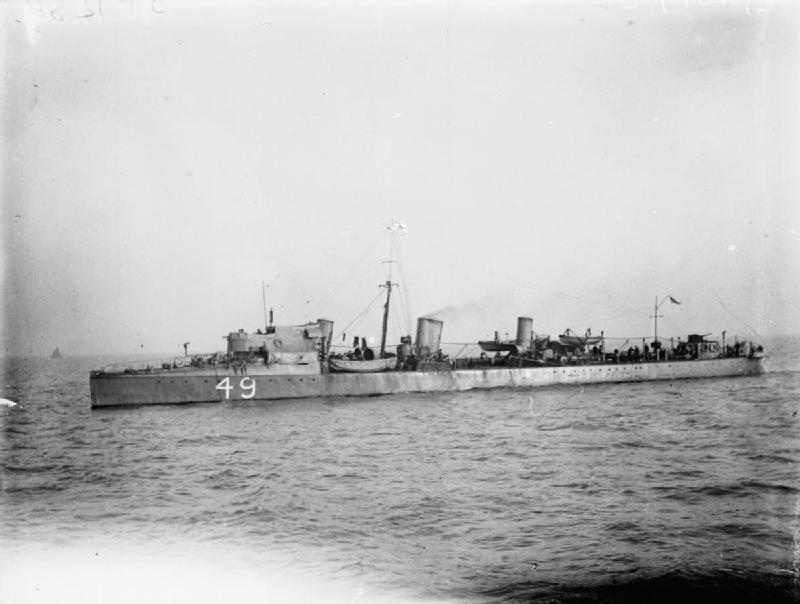
- Kestrel after 1 January 1918

History

United Kingdom
- Name: HMS Kestrel
- Ordered: 1896 – 1897 Naval Estimates
- Builder: J & G Thomson, Clydebank
- Laid down: 2 September 1896
- Launched: 25 March 1898
- Commissioned: April 1900
- Out of service: Laid up in reserve 1919
- Fate: 17 March 1921 sold to Thos. W. Ward of Sheffield for breaking at Rainham, Kent

General characteristics
- Class & type: Clydebank three funnel - 30 knot destroyer
- Displacement: 350 long tons (356 t) standard; 395 long tons (401 t) full load
- Length: 222 ft (67.7 m) o/a
- Beam: 20 ft 8 in (6.30 m)
- Draught: 8 ft 11 in (2.72 m)
- Propulsion: 4 × Normand water tube boiler; 2 × Vertical Triple Expansion (VTE) steam engines driving 2 shafts producing 5,800 ihp (4,300 kW)
- Speed: 30 kn (56 km/h)
- Range: 80 tons coal
- Complement: 63 officers and men
- Armament: 1 × QF 12-pounder 12 cwt Mark I L/40 naval gun nt; 5 × QF 6-pdr 8 cwt naval gun L/40 Naval gun*2 × single tubes for 18-inch (450mm) torpedoes

HMS Kestrel was a Clydebank-built three funnelled 30-knot destroyer ordered by the Royal Navy under the 1895 – 1896 Naval Estimates. She was the fourth ship to carry this name since it was first used in 1846 for a brigantine.

In 1913 she was grouped with similar vessels as a C-class destroyer.

== Construction ==
Kestrel was ordered from J & G Thomson under the 1896–1897 construction programme for the Royal Navy, one of seventeen thirty-knot destroyers ordered from eight shipbuilders under the programme.

The four destroyers ordered from Thomsons under the 1895–1896 programme had problems reaching the contract speed of 30 knots (56 km/h; 35 mph), and Kestrel was built to a revised design with a longer hull. Kestrel was 222 feet 6 inches (67.82 m) long overall and 218 feet (66.4 m) between perpendiculars, a beam of 20 feet 8 inches (6.30 m) and a draught of 8 feet 11 inches (2.72 m). Displacement was 350 long tons (360 t) light and 395 long tons (401 t) full load. Four Normand boilers fed steam at 230 pounds per square inch (1,600 kPa) to triple expansion steam engines rated at 5,800 indicated horsepower (4,300 kW) and driving two propeller shafts.

Armament was specified as a single QF 12 pounder 12 cwt (3 inches (76 mm) calibre) gun on a platform on the ship's conning tower (in practice the platform was also used as the ship's bridge), backed up by five 6-pounder guns, and two 18-inch (450 mm) torpedo tubes.

The ship was laid down as Yard Number 298 on 2 September 1896 at Thomson's shipyard in Clydebank and launched on 25 March 1898. The revised design was successful and Kestrel met the required speed during sea trials. In 1899 during the construction of these ships, steelmaker John Brown and Company of Sheffield bought J & G Thomson's Clydebank yard. She was completed and accepted by the Royal Navy in April 1900, before the four ships ordered under the 1895–1896 programme.

== Pre-War ==
After commissioning she was assigned to the Chatham Division of the Harwich Flotilla. She was deployed in Home waters for her entire service life.

In July 1900, Kestrel took part in the annual Naval Manoeuvres. Kestrel was based at Portsmouth in 1901, and took part in the annual Naval Manoeuvres in July–August that year.

On 7 August 1907 Kestrel and the River-class destroyer Teviot collided off Swanage, with Kestrel's bow being cut off in the collision. Kestrel was brought into Portsmouth Dockyard for repair, where, such was the number of Royal Navy ships requiring repair after recent incidents, (Note: Ships involved in this spate of mishaps included Waveney and Garry, which collided on 26 July, Rother, also damaged by collision on 26 July, Spiteful, which had suffered a fuel fire on 5 August, and Quail, badly damaged in a collision with the cruiser Attentive on 6 August.) only one dock was available to receive Kestrel, and which was only able to accommodate the damaged destroyer because she had lost her bow, as Kestrel was otherwise too long to fit in the dock. Kestrel was part of the 5th Destroyer Flotilla based at Devonport in 1910. In November 1910 she was ordered to Gibraltar for a refit, leaving Devonport at the end of the month in the company of the battleship Swiftsure. On reaching Gibraltar, her crew transferred to the destroyer Mermaid, which had just completed a refit, for the voyage back to home waters.

On 30 August 1912 the Admiralty directed all destroyer classes were to be designated by letters. As a three-funneled destroyer with a contract speed of 30 knots, Kestrel was assigned to the C class. The class letters were painted on the hull below the bridge area and on a funnel.

In February 1913 Kestrel was based at Sheerness as a tender to the "Stone frigate" (or shore establishment) HMS Actaeon, which acted as a torpedo training school. Kestrel was listed as in commission with a nucleus crew.

== World War I ==
Kestrel remained based at Sheerness as a tender to Actaeon in July 1914. With the outbreak of hostilities in August 1914 she was assigned to the Nore Local Flotilla. Her duties included anti-submarine and counter mining patrols in the Thames Estuary.

In 1919 she was paid off and laid-up in reserve awaiting disposal. She was sold on 17 March 1921 to Thos. W. Ward of Sheffield for breaking at Rainham, Kent on the Thames Estuary.

== Pennant Numbers ==
Pennant Number	From	To
N47	6 Dec 1914	1 Sep 1915
D60	1 Sep 1915	1 Jan 1918
D49	1 Jan 1918	17 Mar 1921

== Bibliography ==
- Brassey, T.A. (1902). The Naval Annual 1902. Portsmouth, UK: J. Griffin and Co.
- Chesneau, Roger & Kolesnik, Eugene M., eds. (1979). Conway's All The World's Fighting Ships 1860–1905. London: Conway Maritime Press. ISBN 0-85177-133-5.
- Colledge, J. J.; Warlow, Ben (2006) [1969]. Ships of the Royal Navy: The Complete Record of All Fighting Ships of the Royal Navy from the 15th Century to the Present (3rd Rev ed.). London: Chatham Publishing. ISBN 978-1-86176-281-8. OCLC 67375475.
- Dittmar, F.J.; Colledge, J.J. (1972). British Warships 1914–1919. Shepperton, UK: Ian Allan. ISBN 0-7110-0380-7.
- Friedman, Norman (2009). British Destroyers: From Earliest Days to the Second World War. Barnsley, UK: Seaforth Publishing. ISBN 978-1-84832-049-9.
- Gardiner, Robert & Gray, Randal, eds. (1985). Conway's All The World's Fighting Ships 1906–1921. London: Conway Maritime Press. ISBN 0-85177-245-5.
- Lyon, David (2001) [1996]. The First Destroyers. London: Caxton Editions. ISBN 1-84067-3648.
- Manning, T. D. (1961). The British Destroyer. London: Putnam & Co. OCLC 6470051.
- March, Edgar J. (1966). British Destroyers: A History of Development, 1892–1953; Drawn by Admiralty Permission From Official Records & Returns, Ships' Covers & Building Plans. London: Seeley Service. OCLC 164893555.
- Moore, John E. (1990). Jane's Fighting Ships of World War I. Studio Editions. ISBN 1-85170-378-0.
