= HMS Albatross (1898) =

Destroyer of the Royal Navy

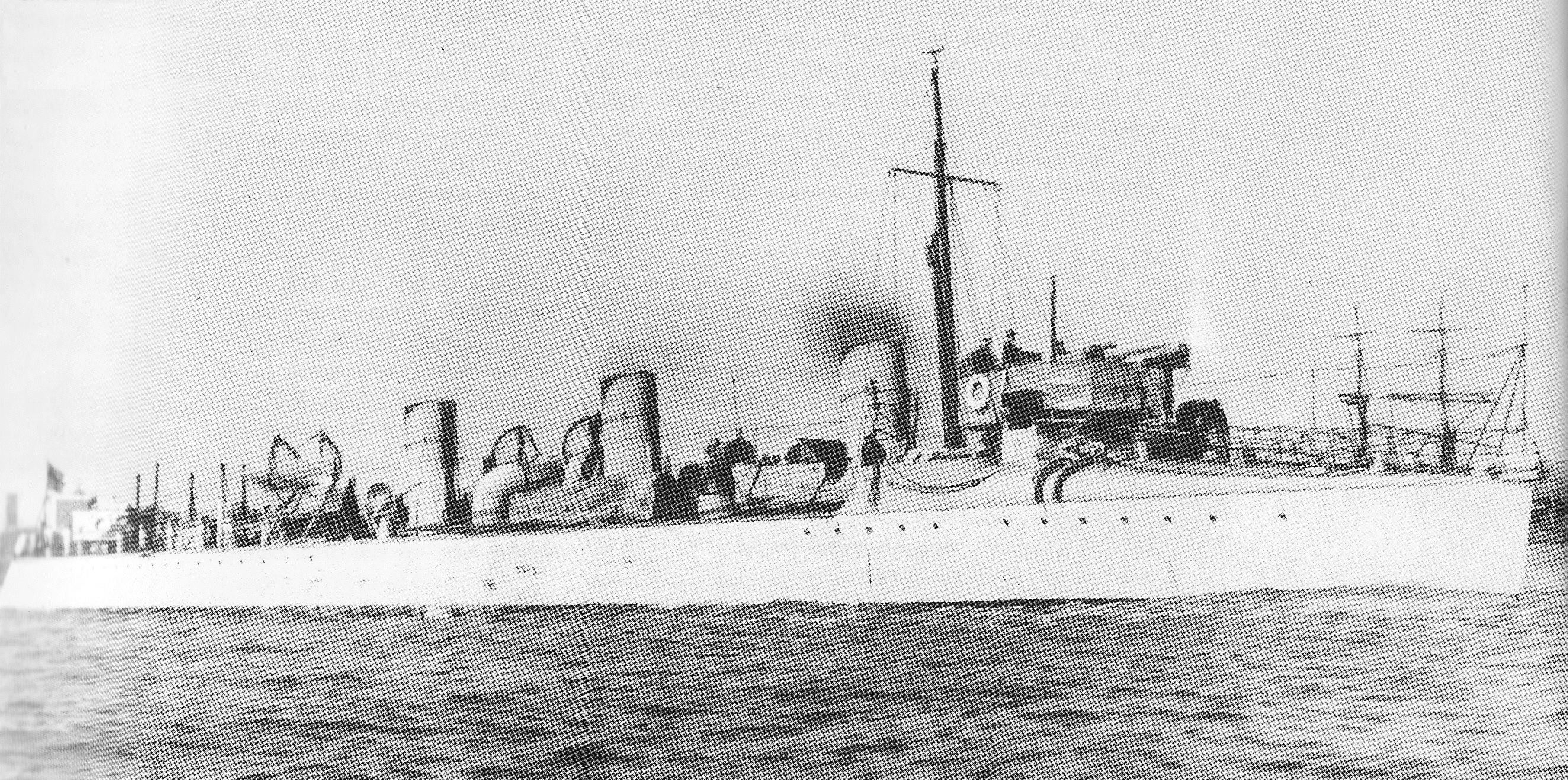
- Albatross in Mediterranean colours, sometime before 1904

History

United Kingdom
- Name: HMS Albatros
- Ordered: 1896 – 1897 Naval Estimates
- Builder: John I. Thornycroft & Company, Chiswick
- Cost: £68,311
- Yard number: 317
- Laid down: 27 November 1896
- Launched: 19 July 1898
- Commissioned: July 1900
- Out of service: 1919
- Fate: Sold 7 June 1920

General characteristics
- Class & type: Thornycroft three funnel - 33 knot destroyer
- Displacement: 430 long tons (437 t) light; 490 long tons (498 t) full load
- Length: 227 ft 0 in (69.2 m) o/a; 225 ft 0 in (68.58 m) w/l
- Beam: 21 ft 3 in (6.5 m)
- Draught: 8 ft 4 1/2 in (2.6 m)
- Installed power: 7,645 ihp (5,701 kW)
- Propulsion: 4 × Thornycroft water tube boiler; 3 × vertical triple-expansion steam engines, driving 2 shafts
- Speed: 31.4 kn (58.2 km/h) (on trials)
- Range: 105 tons coal; 1,545 nmi (2,861 km) at 11 kn (20 km/h; 13 mph)
- Complement: 69–73 officers and men
- Armament: 1 × QF 12-pounder 12 cwt Mark I L/40 gun on a P Mark I low angle mount; 5 × QF 6-pdr 8 cwt L/40 gun on a Mark I * low angle mount; 2 × single tubes for 18-inch (450 mm) torpedoes

Service record
- Operations: World War I 1914–1918

HMS Albatross was an experimental torpedo boat destroyer of the Royal Navy authorised under the 1896–97 Naval Estimates and built by John I. Thornycroft & Company of Chiswick on the River Thames. She was contracted to be faster, larger and more powerful than existing designs.

== Construction and description ==
She was laid down on 27 November 1896, at John I. Thornycroft & Company's Chiswick yard as yard number 318, and launched on 19 July 1898. She was 227 feet 0 inches (69.2 m) in length, had a beam of 21 feet 3 inches (6.5 m) and a draught of 8 feet 4 1/2 inches (2.6 m). The ship displaced 430 tons under a standard load and up to 490 tons under a full load. She featured a large fore-bridge, a mast close to bridge, a turtleback bow, both torpedo tubes aft of third funnel and three equal-sized funnels. She had a Thornycroft stern and dual rudders, which made her very responsive to the helm.

She carried one 12-pounder 12 cwt naval gun, five 6-pounder 8 cwt naval guns and two 18-inch (450 mm) torpedo tubes.

She was propelled by four Thornycroft coal-fired water-tube boilers. The boilers were arranged with the forward boiler venting through the forward funnel, a pair venting through the midships funnel and a single boiler venting through the aft funnel. The boilers supplied steam pressure to three vertical triple-expansion steam engines that turned three shafts developing 7,500 indicated horsepower under a forced draft to achieve the designed speed of 32 knots (59 km/h; 37 mph). The engine rooms were placed aft of the boiler rooms. She carried 105 tons of coal and had a range of 1,545 nautical miles (2,861 km) at a nominal speed of 11 knots (20 km/h; 13 mph). She had a crew of up to 73 officers and men.

She was delivered to Chatham Dockyard in late January 1900 for completion and her trials. Albatross had difficulty making her contract speed even in ideal conditions. Her best speed was 31.5 kn (58.3 km/h; 36.2 mph). The triple-expansion steam engine had reached its limitation, and therefore to generate more speed, it would require a change in technology. In June 1897 Charles Parsons had demonstrated the turbine-powered Turbinia at the Spithead Naval Review. The next group of special destroyers would use this type of powerplant. She was completed and accepted by the Royal Navy in July 1900. The total cost by acceptance was £68,311.

== Service ==
After commissioning in 1900, she was assigned to the British Mediterranean Fleet, under the command of Lieutenant and Commander H.P. Buckle. She is reported in early January 1901 as being back in Home waters, as part of the Medway instructional flotilla. She was paid off at Chatham on 29 August 1901 for repairs to the machinery, and her crew transferred to the destroyer Chamois, which took its place in the Mediterranean Fleet. Commander Edwyn Alexander-Sinclair was appointed in command and re-commissioned her on 24 February 1902 for home sea trials, followed by service with the Mediterranean Fleet. She saw several months of trials as tender to Pembroke, the shore establishment at Chatham, before her departure for the Mediterranean in late May 1902, arriving at Malta on 9 June. In September 1902 she visited the Aegean Sea with other ships of the station for combined manoeuvres near Nauplia, and in early January 1903 there was a similar three-weeks cruise in the Greek islands around Corfu. On her return to the United Kingdom in 1913, she was assigned to the 7th Destroyer Flotilla at Devonport.

On 30 August 1912 the Admiralty directed that all destroyer classes were to be designated by letter. Since her design speed was 30 knots (56 km/h; 35 mph) and she had three funnels, she was assigned with similar ships in the C Class. After 30 September 1913, she was known as a C-class destroyer and had the letter ‘C’ painted on the hull below the bridge area and on either the fore or aft funnel.

In July 1914 she was in active commission in the 7th Destroyer Flotilla, based at Devonport, tendered to Leander, destroyer depot ship to the 7th Flotilla. In September 1914, the 7th was redeployed to the River Humber. Her employment within the Humber Patrol included anti-submarine and counter-mining patrols. She remained in this deployment until 1916 when she deployed to Scapa Flow with HMS Leander. At Scapa Flow she provided anti-submarine defence for the fleet anchorage.

In 1919 she was placed in reserve, awaiting disposal. She was sold on 7 June 1920 to J.W. Houston for breaking at Montrose.

== Pennant numbers ==
Pennant number	From	To
D32	6 December 1914	1 September 1915
D44	1 September 1915	1 January 1918
D02	1 January 1918	7 June 1920

== Bibliography ==
- Chesneau, Roger & Kolesnik, Eugene M., eds. (1979). Conway's All The World's Fighting Ships 1860–1905. London: Conway Maritime Press. ISBN 0-85177-133-5.
- Colledge, J. J.; Warlow, Ben (2006) [1969]. Ships of the Royal Navy: The Complete Record of All Fighting Ships of the Royal Navy from the 15th Century to the Present (3rd Rev ed.). London: Chatham Publishing. ISBN 978-1-86176-281-8. OCLC 67375475.
- Dittmar, F. J. & Colledge, J. J. (1972). British Warships 1914–1919. Shepperton, UK: Ian Allan. ISBN 0-7110-0380-7.
- Friedman, Norman (2009). British Destroyers: From Earliest Days to the Second World War. Barnsley, UK: Seaforth Publishing. ISBN 978-1-84832-049-9.
- Gardiner, Robert & Gray, Randal, eds. (1985). Conway's All The World's Fighting Ships 1906–1921. London: Conway Maritime Press. ISBN 0-85177-245-5.
- Lyon, David (2001) [1996]. The First Destroyers. London: Caxton Editions. ISBN 1-84067-3648.
- Manning, T. D. (1961). The British Destroyer. London: Putnam & Co. OCLC 6470051.
- March, Edgar J. (1966). British Destroyers: A History of Development, 1892–1953; Drawn by Admiralty Permission From Official Records & Returns, Ships' Covers & Building Plans. London: Seeley Service. OCLC 164893555.
