= C-class destroyer (1913) =

1913 class of British destroyers

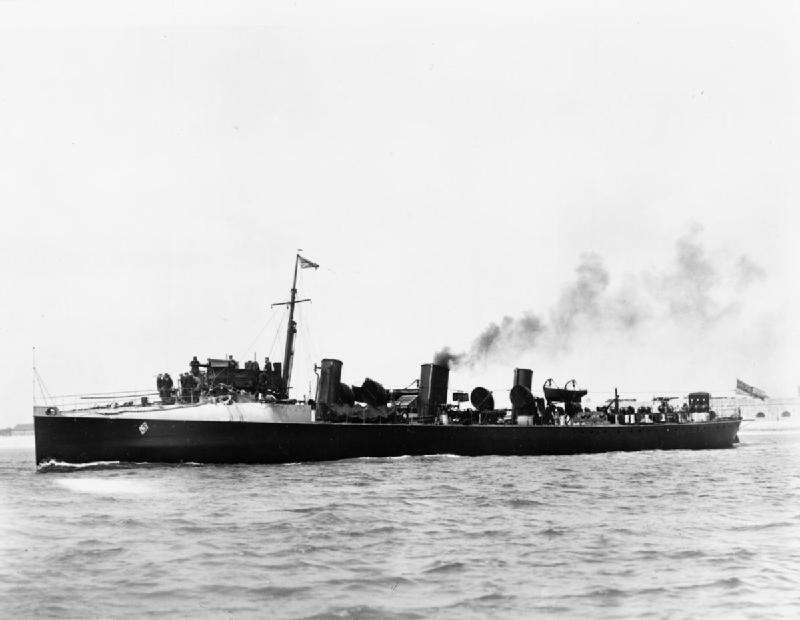
- Chamois

Class overview
- Name: C class
- Builders: Various
- Operators: Royal Navy
- Preceded by: A class "27-Knotters"
- Succeeded by: River or E class
- Built: 1896–1902
- In commission: 1896–1921
- Completed: 40
- Lost: 11
- Scrapped: 29

General characteristics
- Type: Torpedo boat destroyer
- Displacement: 344–445 long tons (350–452 t)
- Length: 209–215 ft (64–66 m)
- Propulsion: Triple expansion steam engines; Coal-fired water-tube boilers; and/or; Steam turbines
- Speed: 30–36.5 knots (55.6–67.6 km/h; 34.5–42.0 mph)
- Complement: 62–68
- Armament: 1 × QF 12-pounder (76-mm) gun; 5 × QF 6-pounder (57-mm) guns; 2 × 18-inch (450-mm) torpedo tubes

The C class as designated in 1913 was a heterogeneous group of torpedo boat destroyers (TBDs) built for the Royal Navy in the late-1890s. They were constructed to the individual designs of their builders to meet Admiralty specifications. The uniting feature of the class was a top speed of 30 knots, a "turtleback" forecastle and that they all had three funnels. The funnels were spaced equidistantly and were of equal height, but the central one was thicker.

In 1913 all "30 knotter" vessels with 3 funnels were classified by the Admiralty as the "C" class to provide some system to the naming of HM destroyers (at the same time, the 4-funnelled, "30 knotters" became the "B" class and the 2-funnelled ships the "D" class). All vessels had the distinctive turtleback that was intended to clear water from the bows but actually tended to dig the bow in to anything of a sea, resulting in a very wet conning position and poor seaboats that were unable to reach top speed in anything but perfect conditions.

They generally displaced around 350 tons and had a length of around 200 feet. All were powered by triple expansion steam engines for 5,800 shaft horsepower (4,300 kW) and had coal-fired water-tube boilers, except some unique "specials" that used steam turbines in addition to, or in lieu of, the reciprocating engines. Armament was one QF 12-pounder gun on a bandstand on the forecastle, five QF 6-pounder (two sided abreast the conning tower, two sided between the funnels and one on the quarterdeck) and two single tubes for 18-inch torpedoes.

== Ships ==
- Star class (390 tons, built by Palmers, Jarrow);
  - Star, launched 11 August 1896, sold for breaking up 10 June 1919.
  - Whiting, launched 26 August 1896, sold for breaking up 27 November 1919.
  - Bat, launched 7 October 1896, sold for breaking up 30 August 1919.
  - Chamois, launched 9 November 1896, foundered 26 September 1904 after mechanical failure caused a propeller blade to penetrate the hull plating.
  - Crane, launched 17 December 1896, sold for breaking up 10 June 1919.
  - Flying Fish, launched 4 March 1897, sold for breaking up 30 August 1919.
  - Fawn, launched 13 April 1897, sold for breaking up 23 July 1919.
  - Flirt, launched 15 May 1897, torpedoed and sunk by German destroyers 27 October 1916.
- Bullfinch class (345 tons, built by Earle, Kingston upon Hull)
  - Bullfinch, launched 10 February 1898, sold for breaking up 10 June 1919.
  - Dove, launched 21 March 1898, sold for breaking up 27 January 1920.
- Violet class (350 tons, built by Doxford, Sunderland)
  - Violet, launched 3 May 1897, sold for breaking up 7 June 1920.
  - Sylvia, launched 3 July 1897, sold for breaking up 23 July 1919.
  - Lee, 365 tons, launched 27 January 1899, wrecked near Blacksod Bay 5 October 1909.
- Avon class (355 tons except last two ships 350 tons, all built by Naval Construction and Armament Company - later Vickers Limited, Barrow in Furness)
  - Avon, launched 10 October 1896, sold for breaking up 1 July 1920.
  - Bittern, launched 1 February 1897, rammed and sunk by SS Kenilworth off Portland Bill, 4 April 1918.
  - Otter, launched 23 November 1896, sold at Hong Kong 26 October 1916.
  - Leopard, launched 20 March 1897, sold for breaking up 10 June 1919.
  - Vixen, launched 29 March 1900, sold for breaking up 17 March 1921.
- Brazen class (345-380 tons, built by J & G Thomson - later to become John Brown and Company, Clydebank)
  - Brazen, launched 3 July 1896, sold for breaking up 4 November 1919.
  - Electra, launched 14 July 1896, sold for breaking up 29 April 1920.
  - Recruit, launched 22 August 1896, torpedoed and sunk by U-boat UB-6 off the Galloper in the River Thames Estuary, 1 May 1915.
  - Vulture, launched 22 March 1898, sold for breaking up 27 May 1919.
  - Kestrel, launched 25 March 1898, sold for breaking up 17 March 1921.
- Mermaid class (355 tons, built by Hawthorn, Newcastle upon Tyne)
  - Cheerful, launched 14 July 1897, mined and sunk off Shetland Islands, 30 June 1917.
  - Mermaid, launched 22 February 1898, sold for breaking up 23 July 1919.
  - Greyhound, launched 6 October 1900, sold for breaking up 10 June 1919.
  - Racehorse, launched 8 November 1900, sold for breaking up 23 March 1920.
  - Roebuck, launched 4 January 1901, broken up at Portsmouth Dockyard in 1919.
- Gipsy class (355 tons, built by Fairfield, Govan)
  - Gipsy, launched 9 March 1897, sold 17 March 1921 and then used as a floating pontoon at Dartmouth for many years.
  - Fairy, launched 25 September 1897, foundered after damaged sustained ramming of UC-75 in North Sea, 31 May 1918.
  - Osprey, launched 7 April 1897, sold for breaking up 4 November 1919.
  - Leven, 370 tons, launched 28 June 1898, sold for breaking up 14 September 1920.
  - Falcon, 375 tons, launched 29 December 1899, sunk in collision 1 April 1918 with trawler John Fitzgerald in the North Sea. The captain was Lieutenant Charles Lightoller RNR, who previously had been second officer of RMS Titanic.
  - Ostrich, 375 tons, launched 22 March 1900, sold for breaking up 29 April 1920.
- John Brown private builds, purchased 31 May 1900 (380 tons, built on speculation by John Brown and Company, formerly J & G Thomson, at Clydebank)
  - Thorn, launched 17 March 1900, broken up at Portsmouth Dockyard in 1919.
  - Tiger, launched 19 May 1900, sank in collision with HMS Berwick off St. Catherine's Point 2 April 1908.
  - Vigilant, launched 16 August 1900, sold for breaking up 10 February 1920.
- Thornycroft special
  - Albatross, 380 tons, launched 19 July 1898, sold for breaking up 7 June 1920.
- Viper class Hawthorn specials, (4 shafts, steam turbines)
  - Viper, 344 tons, launched 6 September 1899, wrecked near Alderney in accident 3 August 1901.
  - Velox (ex-Python), 445 tons, launched 11 February 1902, mined and sunk off Nab light vessel, 25 October 1915.

== See also ==
- B-class destroyer (1913)
- D-class destroyer (1913)

== Bibliography ==
- Chesneau, Roger & Kolesnik, Eugene M., eds. (1979). Conway's All The World's Fighting Ships 1860–1905. London: Conway Maritime Press. ISBN 0-85177-133-5.
- Colledge, J. J.; Warlow, Ben (2006) [1969]. Ships of the Royal Navy: The Complete Record of All Fighting Ships of the Royal Navy from the 15th Century to the Present (3rd Rev ed.). London: Chatham Publishing. ISBN 978-1-86176-281-8. OCLC 67375475.
- Dittmar, F.J.; Colledge, J. J. (1972). British Warships 1914–1919. Shepperton, UK: Ian Allan. ISBN 0-7110-0380-7.
- Friedman, Norman (2009). British Destroyers: From Earliest Days to the Second World War. Barnsley, UK: Seaforth Publishing. ISBN 978-1-84832-049-9.
- Gardiner, Robert & Gray, Randal, eds. (1985). Conway's All The World's Fighting Ships 1906–1921. London: Conway Maritime Press. ISBN 0-85177-245-5.
- Lyon, David (2001) [1996]. The First Destroyers. London: Caxton Editions. ISBN 1-84067-364-8.
- Manning, T. D. (1961). The British Destroyer. London: Putnam & Co. OCLC 6470051.
- March, Edgar J. (1966). British Destroyers: A History of Development, 1892–1953; Drawn by Admiralty Permission From Official Records & Returns, Ships' Covers & Building Plans. London: Seeley Service. OCLC 164893555.
