= HMS Berwick (1902) =

Cruiser of the Royal Navy

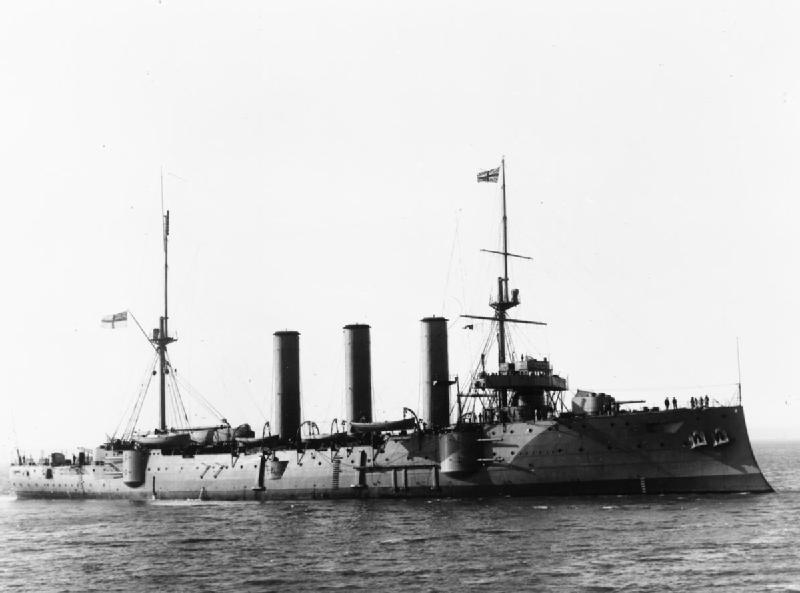
- Berwick at anchor

History

United Kingdom
- Name: Berwick
- Namesake: Berwickshire
- Builder: Beardmore, Dalmuir
- Laid down: 19 April 1901
- Launched: 20 September 1902
- Christened: Lady Houstoun-Boswall
- Completed: 9 December 1903
- Fate: Sold for scrap, 1 July 1920

General characteristics
- Class & type: Monmouth-class armoured cruiser
- Displacement: 9,800 long tons (10,000 t) (normal)
- Length: 463 ft 6 in (141.3 m) (o/a)
- Beam: 66 ft (20.1 m)
- Draught: 25 ft (7.6 m)
- Installed power: 31 water-tube boilers; 22,000 ihp (16,000 kW)
- Propulsion: 2 × shafts; 2 × triple-expansion steam engines
- Speed: 23 knots (43 km/h; 26 mph)
- Complement: 678
- Armament: 2 × twin, 10 × single 6 in (152 mm) guns; 10 × single 12-pdr (3 in (76 mm)) guns; 3 × single 3-pdr (1.9 in (47 mm)) guns; 2 × 18 in (450 mm) torpedo tubes
- Armour: Belt: 2–4 in (51–102 mm); Decks: 0.75–2 in (19–51 mm); Barbettes: 4 in (102 mm); Turrets: 4 in (102 mm); Conning tower: 10 in (254 mm)

HMS Berwick was one of 10 Monmouth-class armoured cruisers built for the Royal Navy in the first decade of the 20th century. She was assigned to the 2nd Cruiser Squadron of the Channel Fleet upon completion in 1903 and was transferred to the Home Fleet in 1906. She accidentally rammed and sank British destroyer HMS Tiger in 1908. Berwick was refitted in 1908–09 before she was transferred to the 4th Cruiser Squadron on the North America and West Indies Station later that year.

She captured a German merchant ship shortly after World War I began. The ship patrolled for German commerce raiders and escorted convoys for the war. Berwick was assigned to the 8th Light Cruiser Squadron in 1919 before she was paid off and sold for scrap in 1920.

== Design and description ==
The Monmouths were intended to protect British merchant shipping from fast cruisers like the French Guichen, Châteaurenault or the Dupleix class. The ships were designed to displace 9,800 long tons (10,000 t). They had an overall length of 463 feet 6 inches (141.3 m), a beam of 66 feet (20.1 m) and a deep draught of 25 feet (7.6 m). They were powered by two 4-cylinder triple-expansion steam engines, each driving one shaft using steam provided by 31 Belleville boilers. The engines produced a total of 22,000 indicated horsepower (16,000 kW) which was designed to give the ships a maximum speed of 23 knots (43 km/h; 26 mph). The ship carried a maximum of 1,600 long tons (1,600 t) of coal and her complement consisted of 678 officers and ratings.

The Monmouth-class ships' main armament consisted of fourteen breech-loading (BL) 6-inch (152 mm) Mk VII guns. Four of these guns were mounted in two twin-gun turrets, one each fore and aft of the superstructure, and the others were positioned in casemates amidships. Six of these were mounted on the main deck and were only usable in calm weather. Ten quick-firing (QF) 12-pounder (3-inch (76 mm)) 12-cwt guns (Note: "Cwt" is the abbreviation for hundredweight, 12 cwt referring to the weight of the gun.) were fitted for defence against torpedo boats. Berwick also carried three 3-pounder 1.9 in (47 mm) Hotchkiss guns and two submerged 18-inch (450 mm) torpedo tubes.

Beginning in 1915, the main deck six-inch guns of the Monmouth-class ships were moved to the upper deck and given gun shields. Their casemates were plated over to improve seakeeping. The twelve-pounder guns displaced by the transfer were repositioned elsewhere. At some point in the war, a pair of three-pounder anti-aircraft guns were installed on the upper deck, although Berwick had hers removed before the end of the war.

The ship's waterline armour belt was four inches (102 mm) thick amidships and two-inch (51 mm) forward. The armour of the gun turrets, their barbettes and the casemates was four inches thick. The protective deck armour ranged in thickness from 0.75–2 inches (19–51 mm) and the conning tower was protected by ten inches (254 mm) of armour.

== Construction and service ==
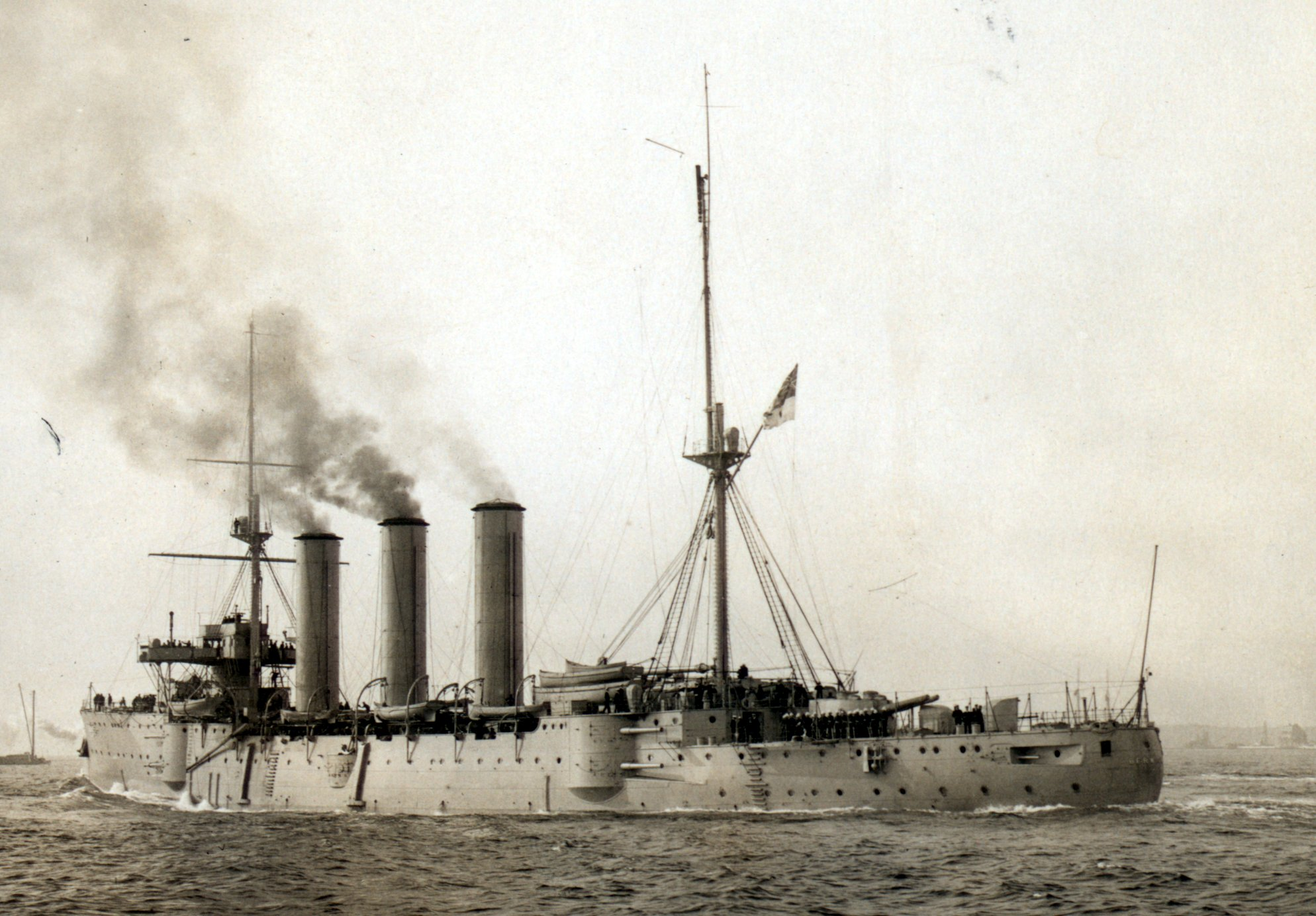
Port rear oblique view of Berwick

Berwick, named for the Scottish county, was laid down by Beardmore at their shipyard in Dalmuir on 19 April 1901 and launched on 20 September 1902 when she was named by Lady Houstoun-Boswall. She was completed on 9 December 1903 and was initially assigned to the 2nd Cruiser Squadron of the Channel Fleet. She was transferred to the Home Fleet in March 1906. On 2 April 1908, she accidentally collided with the destroyer Tiger when the destroyer crossed Berwick's bows during a night exercise in the English Channel, south of the Isle of Wight. Tiger was sliced in two and sank with the loss of 36 lives. After a refit at Portsmouth Royal Dockyard that ended in April 1909, she was assigned to the 4th Cruiser Squadron on the North America and West Indies Station.

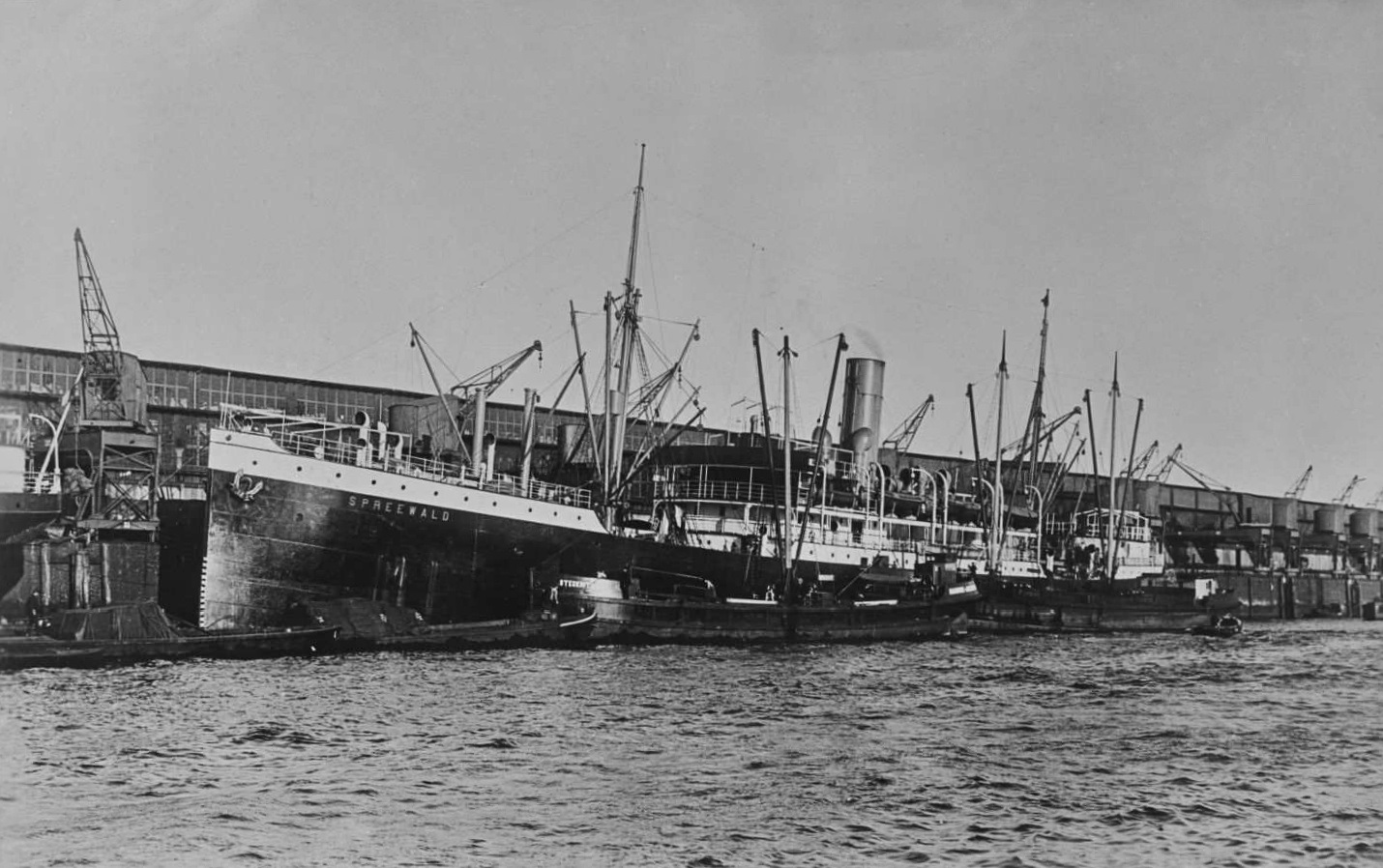
The German steamship Spreewald

She was still there when World War I began in August 1914, and captured the Hamburg America Line merchant ship Spreewald on 10 September. She patrolled for German raiders and escorted convoys for the rest of the war. Berwick was assigned to the 8th Light Cruiser Squadron in 1919 before she was sold for scrap on 1 July 1920. She was broken up in Germany in 1922.

== Bibliography ==
- Corbett, Julian (1997) [1938]. Naval Operations to the Battle of the Falklands. History of the Great War: Based on Official Documents. Vol. I (2nd ed.). London and Nashville, Tennessee: Imperial War Museum and Battery Press. ISBN 0-89839-256-X.
- Friedman, Norman (2012). British Cruisers of the Victorian Era. Barnsley, UK: Seaforth. ISBN 978-1-59114-068-9.
- Friedman, Norman (2011). Naval Weapons of World War One: Guns, Torpedoes, Mines and ASW Weapons of All Nations; An Illustrated Directory. Barnsley, UK: Seaforth Publishing. ISBN 978-1-84832-100-7.
- Massie, Robert K. (2003). Castles of Steel: Britain, Germany, and the Winning of the Great War at Sea. New York: Random House. ISBN 0-679-45671-6.
- McBride, Keith (1988). "The First County Class Cruisers of the Royal Navy, Part I: The Monmouths". Warship. 46 (April). London: Conway Maritime Press: 19–26. ISSN 0142-6222.
- Preston, Antony (1985). "Great Britain and Empire Forces". In Gray, Randal (ed.). Conway's All the World's Fighting Ships 1906–1921. Annapolis, Maryland: Naval Institute Press. pp. 1–104. ISBN 0-85177-245-5.
- J, Helen, ed. (9 October 2018). "HMS Berwick – March 1914 to July 1919, West Atlantic (4th Cruiser Squadron), North America & West Indies Station, North Atlantic convoys, Pacific coast of South America (8th Light Cruiser Squadron)". Royal Navy Log Books of the World War 1 Era. Naval-History.net.
- Roberts, John (1979). "Great Britain and Empire Forces". In Chesneau, Roger & Kolesnik, Eugene M. (eds.). Conway's All the World's Fighting Ships 1860-1905. Greenwich, UK: Conway Maritime Press. pp. 1–113. ISBN 0-8317-0302-4.
- Silverstone, Paul H. (1984). Directory of the World's Capital Ships. New York: Hippocrene Books. ISBN 0-88254-979-0.
