= HMS Vigilant (1900) =

Destroyer of the Royal Navy

History

United Kingdom
- Name: Vigilant
- Builder: John Brown and Company, Clydebank
- Laid down: Speculative Build
- Launched: 16 August 1900
- Acquired: 1899 – 1900 Naval Estimates
- Commissioned: June 1901
- Out of service: In 1919 paid off and laid-up in reserve awaiting disposal
- Fate: 10 February 1920 sold to South Alloa Ship Breaking Company for breaking at Charlestown near Rosyth on the Firth of Forth

General characteristics
- Class & type: Clydebank three-funnel, 30-knot destroyer
- Displacement: 350 long tons (356 t) standard; 395 long tons (401 t) full load; 218 ft (66 m) o/a; 20 ft 8 in (6.30 m) Beam; 8 ft 11 in (2.72 m) Draught
- Propulsion: 4 × Thornycroft water tube boiler; 2 × Vertical Triple Expansion (VTE) steam engines driving 2 shafts producing 5,800 shp (4,300 kW)
- Speed: 30 kn (56 km/h)
- Range: 80 tons coal; 1,465 nautical miles (2,713 km) at 11 knots (20 km/h; 13 mph)
- Complement: 63 officers and men
- Armament: 1 × QF 12-pounder 12 cwt Mark I L/40 naval gun on a P Mark I Low angle mount; 5 × QF 6-pdr 8 cwt naval gun L/40 Naval gun on a Mark I* low angle mount; 2 × single tubes for 18-inch (450mm) torpedoes

HMS Vigilant was a Clydebank three-funnel, 30-knot destroyer purchased by the Royal Navy under the 1899–1900 Naval Estimates. She was the ninth ship to carry this name since it was introduced in 1755 for an 8-gun schooner captured in 1756 by the French at Oswego.

== Construction and career ==
She was laid down as a speculative build Yard No 116 at the John Brown and Company shipyard in Clydebank. She was purchased by the Royal Navy on 31 March 1900 and was launched on 19 August 1900. During her trials, she made her contract speed of 30 knots (56 km/h; 35 mph). She was completed and accepted by the Royal Navy in June 1901. After commissioning she was assigned to the Channel Fleet in the Portsmouth Flotilla. She spent her operational career mainly in Home Waters, operating with the Channel Fleet.

On 30 August 1912 the Admiralty directed all destroyer classes were to be designated by alpha characters starting with the letter 'A'. Since her design speed was 30 knots (56 km/h; 35 mph) with three funnels, she was assigned to the C Class. After 30 September 1913, she was known as a C-Class destroyer and had the letter ‘C’ painted on the hull below the bridge area and on either the fore or aft funnel.

=== World War I ===
In July 1914 Vigilant was part of the Eighth Patrol Flotilla, based at Chatham.

In 1919, HMS Vigilant was paid off and laid-up in reserve, awaiting disposal. She was sold on 10 February 1920 to South Alloa Ship Breaking Company for breaking at Charlestown near Rosyth on the Firth of Forth.

== Pennant Numbers ==
Pennant Number	From	To
D43	6 Dec 1914	1 Sep 1915
D72	1 Sep 1915	1 Jan 1918
D92	1 Jan 1918	10 Feb 1920

== Bibliography ==
- Chesneau, Roger & Kolesnik, Eugene M., eds. (1979). Conway's All The World's Fighting Ships 1860–1905. London: Conway Maritime Press. ISBN 0-85177-133-5.
- Colledge, J. J.; Warlow, Ben (2006) [1969]. Ships of the Royal Navy: The Complete Record of All Fighting Ships of the Royal Navy from the 15th Century to the Present (3rd Rev ed.). London: Chatham Publishing. ISBN 978-1-86176-281-8. OCLC 67375475.
- Dittmar, F. J. & Colledge, J. J. (1972). British Warships 1914–1919. Shepperton, UK: Ian Allan. ISBN 0-7110-0380-7.
- Friedman, Norman (2009). British Destroyers: From Earliest Days to the Second World War. Barnsley, UK: Seaforth Publishing. ISBN 978-1-84832-049-9.
- Gardiner, Robert & Gray, Randal, eds. (1985). Conway's All The World's Fighting Ships 1906–1921. London: Conway Maritime Press. ISBN 0-85177-245-5.
- Lyon, David (2001) [1996]. The First Destroyers. London: Caxton Editions. ISBN 1-84067-3648.
- Manning, T. D. (1961). The British Destroyer. London: Putnam & Co. OCLC 6470051.
- March, Edgar J. (1966). British Destroyers: A History of Development, 1892–1953; Drawn by Admiralty Permission From Official Records & Returns, Ships' Covers & Building Plans. London: Seeley Service. OCLC 164893555.
