= HMS Thorn (1900) =

British destroyer

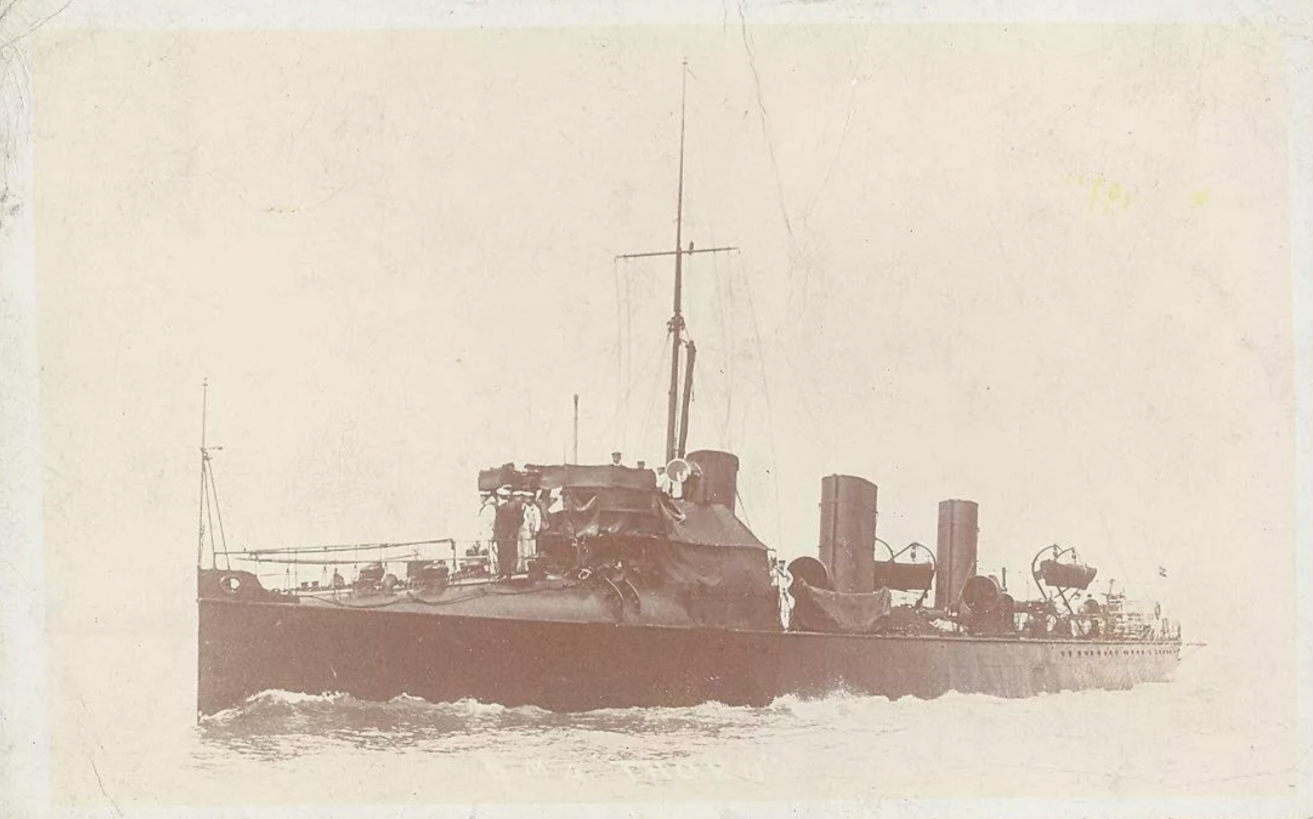
- HMS Thorn in 1920

History

United Kingdom
- Name: Thorn
- Builder: John Brown and Company, Clydebank
- Laid down: Speculative Build
- Launched: 17 March 1900
- Acquired: 1899 – 1900 Naval Estimates
- Commissioned: June 1901
- Out of service: December 1918 she was paid off and laid-up in reserve awaiting disposal
- Fate: Broken at Portsmouth Dockyard in 1919

General characteristics
- Class & type: Clydebank three funnel - 30 knot destroyer
- Displacement: 350 long tons (356 t) standard; 395 long tons (401 t)
- Length: 218 ft (66 m) o/a
- Beam: 20 ft 8 in (6.30 m)
- Draught: 8 ft 11 in (2.72 m)
- Propulsion: 4 × Thornycroft water tube boiler; 2 × Vertical Triple Expansion (VTE) steam engines driving 2 shafts producing 5,800 shp (4,300 kW)
- Speed: 30 kn (56 km/h)
- Range: 80 tons coal; 1,465 nmi (2,713 km) at 11 kn (20 km/h)
- Complement: 63
- Armament: 1 × QF 12-pounder 12 cwt Mark I L/40 naval gun on a P Mark I Low angle mount; 5 × QF 6-pdr 8 cwt naval gun L/40 Naval gun on a Mark I* low angle mount; 2 × single tubes for 18-inch (450mm) torpedoes

HMS Thorn was a Clydebank three funnel - 30 knot destroyer purchased by the Royal Navy under the 1899–1900 Naval Estimates. She was the second ship to carry this name since it was introduced in 1779 for a 16-gun sloop sold in 1816.

== Construction and career ==
She was laid down as a speculative build yard number 334 at the John Brown and Company shipyard in Clydebank and was launched on 17 March 1900. She was then acquired by the Royal Navy on 31 March 1900. During her sea trials she made her contract speed of 30 knots (56 km/h; 35 mph). She was completed and accepted by the Royal Navy in June 1901.

After commissioning she was assigned to the Channel Fleet in the Devonport Flotilla. She spent her operational career mainly in Home Waters. She was paid off on 4 January 1902, when her crew was turned over to HMS Opossum, which took her place in the flotilla.

On 30 August 1912 the Admiralty directed all destroyer classes were to be designated by alphabetical characters starting with the letter 'A'. Since her design speed was 30 knots and she had three funnels she was assigned to the 'C' class. After 30 September 1913, she was known as a C-class destroyer and had the letter 'C' painted on the hull below the bridge area and on either the fore or aft funnel.

=== World War I and disposition ===
July 1914 found her in active commission with the 7th Flotilla based at Devonport. In August 1914 the 7th Flotilla was deployed to the Humber River. Her employment with the 7th Flotilla included participating in anti-submarine and counter mining patrols. In November 1916 she was deployed to Londonderry Port, Ireland. Here her duties included anti-submarine and counter mining patrols and escorting merchant vessels.

By December 1918 she was paid off and laid up in reserve awaiting disposal. She was broken up at Portsmouth Dockyard in 1919.

== Pennant numbers ==
Pennant Number	From	To
D57	6 Dec 1914	1 Sep 1915
D70	1 Sep 1915	1 Jan 1918
D89	1 Jan 1918	Dec 1918

== Bibliography ==
- Chesneau, Roger & Kolesnik, Eugene M., eds. (1979). Conway's All The World's Fighting Ships 1860–1905. London: Conway Maritime Press. ISBN 0-85177-133-5.
- Colledge, J. J.; Warlow, Ben (2006) [1969]. Ships of the Royal Navy: The Complete Record of All Fighting Ships of the Royal Navy from the 15th Century to the Present (3rd Rev ed.). London: Chatham Publishing. ISBN 978-1-86176-281-8. OCLC 67375475.
- Dittmar, F. J. & Colledge, J. J. (1972). British Warships 1914–1919. Shepperton, UK: Ian Allan. ISBN 0-7110-0380-7.
- Friedman, Norman (2009). British Destroyers: From Earliest Days to the Second World War. Barnsley, UK: Seaforth Publishing. ISBN 978-1-84832-049-9.
- Gardiner, Robert & Gray, Randal, eds. (1985). Conway's All The World's Fighting Ships 1906–1921. London: Conway Maritime Press. ISBN 0-85177-245-5.
- Lyon, David (2001) [1996]. The First Destroyers. London: Caxton Editions. ISBN 1-84067-3648.
- Manning, T. D. (1961). The British Destroyer. London: Putnam & Co. OCLC 6470051.
- March, Edgar J. (1966). British Destroyers: A History of Development, 1892–1953; Drawn by Admiralty Permission From Official Records & Returns, Ships' Covers & Building Plans. London: Seeley Service. OCLC 164893555.
