= HMS Vulture (1898) =

Destroyer of the Royal Navy

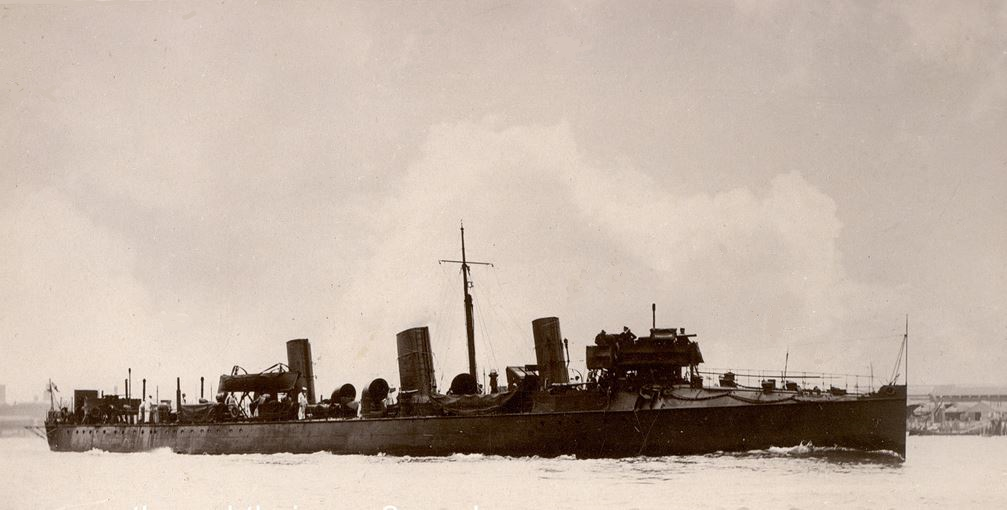
- HMS Vulture

History

United Kingdom
- Name: Vulture
- Ordered: 1895 – 1896 Naval Estimates
- Builder: J & G Thompson, Clydebank
- Laid down: 26 November 1895
- Launched: 22 March 1898
- Commissioned: May 1900
- Out of service: Laid up in reserve 1919
- Fate: 27 May 1919 sold to Hayes of Porthcawl for breaking

General characteristics
- Class & type: Clydebank three funnel - 30 knot destroyer
- Displacement: 345 long tons (351 t) standard; 385 long tons (391 t) full load; 214 ft (65 m) o/a; 20 ft (6.1 m) Beam; 8 ft 6 in (2.59 m) Draught
- Propulsion: 4 × Thornycroft water tube boiler; 2 × Vertical Triple Expansion (VTE) steam engines driving 2 shafts producing 5,800 shp (4,300 kW)
- Speed: 30 kn (56 km/h)
- Range: 80 tons coal; 1,465 nmi (2,713 km) at 11 kn (20 km/h)
- Complement: 63 officers and men
- Armament: 1 × QF 12-pounder 12 cwt Mark I L/40 naval gun on a P Mark I Low angle mount; 5 × QF 6-pdr 8 cwt naval gun L/40 Naval gun on a Mark I* low angle mount; 2 × single tubes for 18-inch (450mm) torpedoes

Service record
- Operations: World War I 1914 - 1918

HMS Vulture was a Clydebank three funnel - 30 knot destroyer ordered by the Royal Navy under the 1895 – 1896 Naval Estimates. She was the fifth ship to carry this name since it was introduced in 1776 for a 14-gun sloop sold until 1802.

== Construction and career ==
She was laid down as Yard Number 291 on 26 November 1895 at J & G Thompson shipyard in Clydebank. Her hull was lengthened to 222 feet and launched on 22 March 1898. During her builder's trials she made her contract speed of 30 knots. In 1899 during the construction of these ships, steelmaker John Brown and Company of Sheffield bought J&G Thomson's Clydebank yard for £923,255 3s 3d. She was completed and accepted by the Royal Navy in May 1900. She was the last to be laid down but the first accepted in this group. After commissioning she was assigned to the Chatham Division of the Harwich Flotilla. She was deployed in Home waters for her entire service life.

On 30 August 1912 the Admiralty directed all destroyer classes were to be designated by alpha characters starting with the letter 'A'. Since her design speed was 30-knots and she had three funnels she was assigned to the C Class. After 30 September 1913, she was known as a C Class destroyer and had the letter ‘C’ painted on the hull below the bridge area and on either the fore or aft funnel.

=== World War I ===
In 1914 she was undergoing refit at the Nore based at Sheerness tendered to HMS Actaeon, a Royal Navy training establishment. With the outbreak of hostilities in August 1914 she was assigned to the Nore Local Flotilla. Her duties included anti-submarine and counter mining patrols in the Thames Estuary. She remained in this employment for the duration of the war.

In 1919 she was paid off and laid-up in reserve awaiting disposal. She was sold on 27 May 1919 to Hayes of Porthcawl for breaking.

== Pennant Numbers ==
Pennant Number	From	To
N50	6 Dec 1914	1 Sep 1915
D75	1 Sep 1915	1 Jan 1918
unk	1 Jan 1918	4 Nov 1919

== Bibliography ==
- Chesneau, Roger & Kolesnik, Eugene M., eds. (1979). Conway's All The World's Fighting Ships 1860–1905. London: Conway Maritime Press. ISBN 0-85177-133-5.
- Colledge, J. J.; Warlow, Ben (2006) [1969]. Ships of the Royal Navy: The Complete Record of All Fighting Ships of the Royal Navy from the 15th Century to the Present (3rd Rev ed.). London: Chatham Publishing. ISBN 978-1-86176-281-8. OCLC 67375475.
- Dittmar, F. J. & Colledge, J. J. (1972). British Warships 1914–1919. Shepperton, UK: Ian Allan. ISBN 0-7110-0380-7.
- Friedman, Norman (2009). British Destroyers: From Earliest Days to the Second World War. Barnsley, UK: Seaforth Publishing. ISBN 978-1-84832-049-9.
- Gardiner, Robert & Gray, Randal, eds. (1985). Conway's All The World's Fighting Ships 1906–1921. London: Conway Maritime Press. ISBN 0-85177-245-5.
- Lyon, David (2001) [1996]. The First Destroyers. London: Caxton Editions. ISBN 1-84067-3648.
- Manning, T. D. (1961). The British Destroyer. London: Putnam & Co. OCLC 6470051.
- March, Edgar J. (1966). British Destroyers: A History of Development, 1892–1953; Drawn by Admiralty Permission From Official Records & Returns, Ships' Covers & Building Plans. London: Seeley Service. OCLC 164893555.
