= Brazen-class destroyer =

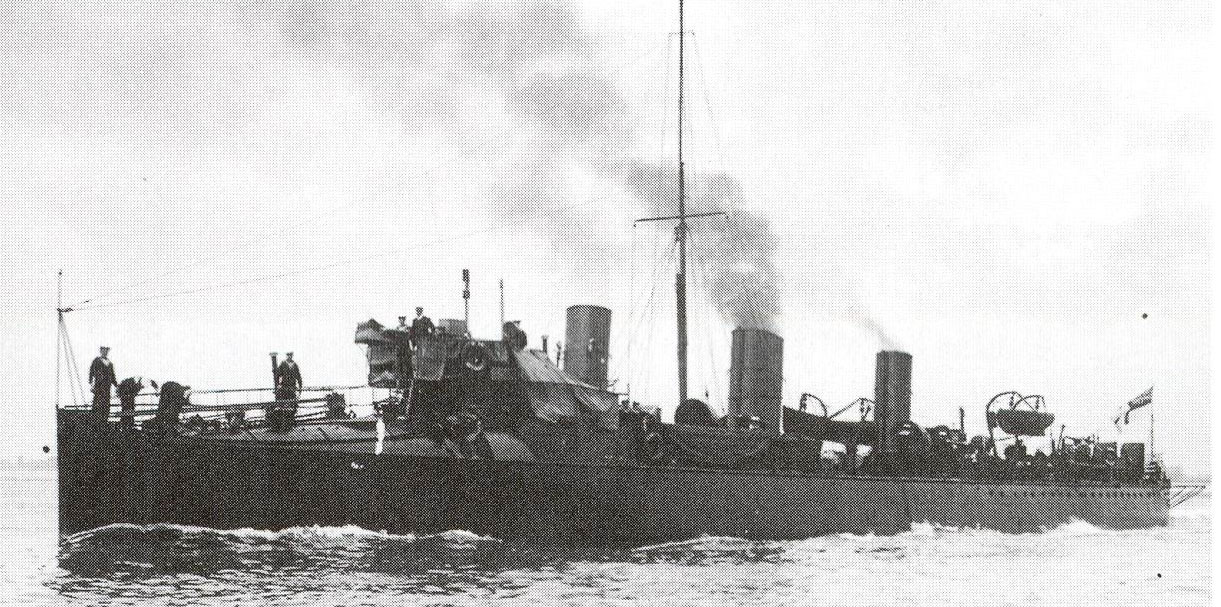
- HMS Recruit in 1896

Class overview
- Operators: Royal Navy
- Built: 1896
- Completed: 4
- Lost: 1
- Scrapped: 3

General characteristics
- Type: Destroyer
- Speed: 30 knots (56 km/h)
- Notes: Re-classified as C-class destroyers in 1913

The Brazen class of 4 torpedo-boat destroyers were built by J & G Thomson at Clydebank in Glasgow, from 1895 to 1900. They formed part of a general group of over seventy "turtleback" destroyers capable of 30 knots built around the end of the 19th and into the start of the 20th century for the Royal Navy.

The Admiralty had specified the general design and specification of the destroyers but left it to the builders to handle the detail. As a result, although the destroyers were all similarly capable there were differences between them in terms of exact dimensions, type of boiler and engines and the number of funnels. They were seaworthy and well built but suffered from being lively which meant they were uncomfortable in heavy seas. Although specified for 30 knots this was with a light load, and in service 27 knots was normal.

In 1913 all the three-funnelled destroyers were reclassified as C-class destroyers.

== Ships ==
Name	Launched	Fate
HMS Brazen	3 July 1896	Broken up in 1919
HMS Electra	14 July 1896	Broken up in 1920
HMS Recruit	22 August 1896	Torpedoed in 1915
HMS Vulture	22 March 1898	Broken up in 1919
