= HMS Ostrich (1900) =

Destroyer of the Royal Navy

History

United Kingdom
- Name: Ostrich
- Ordered: 1898 – 1899 Naval Estimates
- Builder: Fairfield Shipbuilding and Engineering Company, Govan, Glasgow
- Laid down: 28 June 1899
- Launched: 22 March 1900
- Commissioned: December 1901
- Out of service: Laid up, December 1918
- Fate: Sold for breaking, 29 April 1920

General characteristics
- Class & type: Fairfield three-funnel, 30-knot destroyer
- Displacement: 375 long tons (381 t) standard; 420 long tons (427 t) full load
- Length: 215 ft 6 in (65.68 m) o/a
- Beam: 21 ft (6.4 m)
- Draught: 8 ft 2 in (2.49 m)
- Installed power: 6,000 shp (4,500 kW)
- Propulsion: 4 × Thornycroft water tube boilers; 2 × vertical triple-expansion steam engines; 2 × shafts
- Speed: 30 kn (56 km/h)
- Range: 80 tons coal; 1,615 nmi (2,991 km) at 11 kn (20 km/h)
- Complement: 63 officers and men
- Armament: 1 × QF 12-pounder 12 cwt Mark I L/40 naval gun on a P Mark I low angle mount; 5 × QF 6-pounder 8 cwt L/40 naval gun on a Mark I * low angle mount; 2 × single tubes for 18-inch (450mm) torpedoes

HMS Ostrich was a Fairfield three-funnel, 30-knot torpedo boat destroyer ordered by the Royal Navy under the 1898 – 1899 Naval Estimates. In 1913 she was grouped as a C-class destroyer. She was the first Royal Navy ship to carry this name. She spent most of her operational career in home waters, operating with the Channel Fleet as part of the Portsmouth Instructional Flotilla, and was sold for breaking in 1920.

== Construction and description ==
On 30 March 1899, the British Admiralty placed an order with the shipbuilder Fairfield Shipbuilding and Engineering Company for two "Thirty-Knotter" torpedo-boat destroyers, Falcon and Ostrich. As with other early Royal Navy destroyers, the design of Ostrich was left to the builder, with the Admiralty laying down only broad requirements.

Ostrich was 214 feet 6 inches (65.38 m) long overall and 209 feet 9 inches (63.93 m) between perpendiculars, with a beam of 12 feet 2 inches (3.71 m) and a draught of 8 ft 9 in (2.67 m). Displacement was 375 long tons (381 t) light and 420 long tons (430 t) full load. Four Thornycroft boilers, with their out-takes routed to three funnels, drove triple-expansion steam engines rated at 6,300 indicated horsepower (4,700 kW). The ship had the standard armament of the Thirty-Knotters—a QF 12 pounder 12 cwt (3 in (76 mm) calibre) gun on a platform on the ship's conning tower (in practice the platform was also used as the ship's bridge), with a secondary armament of five 6-pounder guns, and two 18-inch (450 mm) torpedo tubes.

She was laid down as Yard No 413 on 28 June 1899, at the Fairfield shipyard at Govan, Glasgow, and launched on 22 March 1900. During her builder's trials she made her contracted speed requirement. She was completed and accepted by the Royal Navy in December 1901.

== Service history ==
Ostrich was commissioned at Devonport on 4 January 1902, and was assigned to the Channel Fleet to serve in the instructional flotilla. She paid off at Devonport on 12 May 1902, when her crew transferred to HMS Lively, which was the following day commissioned for the instructional flotilla. In late August she received the crew of HMS Decoy, and took her place in the Devonport instructional flotilla.

On 30 August 1912 the Admiralty directed that all destroyer classes were to be designated by alphabetic characters starting with the letter 'A'. Since her design speed was 30-knots and she had three funnels she was assigned to the C class. After 30 September 1913, she was known as a C-class destroyer and had the letter 'C' painted on the hull below the bridge area and one of her funnels.

In 1912, older destroyers were organised into Patrol Flotillas, with Ostrich being part of the 6th Flotilla, based at Portsmouth, in March 1913. She had transferred to the 8th Flotilla, based at Chatham by February 1914.

=== World War I ===
For the test mobilization in July 1914 she remained part of the 8th Destroyer Flotilla. The 8th Flotilla was deployed to move to Rosyth immediately prior to the outbreak of the war to provide local defence for the Firth of Forth. Ostrich remained part of the 8th Flotilla in June 1917, but by July had transferred to the East Coast Convoy Flotilla. On 12 July Ostrich and the destroyer Thrasher were escorting a north-bound convoy when the German submarine UC-55 attacked the convoy, torpedoing and sinking the Norwegian merchant ship Balzac. Although Thrasher retaliated with a depth charge, the submarine was undamaged. In October 1917, Ostrich was listed as being under the Captain-in-Charge Lowestoft. She remained based at Lowestoft until the end of the war.

In 1919 Ostrich was paid off and laid-up in reserve awaiting disposal. She was sold on 29 April 1920 to the Barking Ship Breaking Company for scrap.

== Pennant numbers ==
Pennant number	From	To
P56	6 December 1914	1 September 1915
D65	1 September 1915	1 January 1918

== Bibliography ==
- Chesneau, Roger; Kolesnik, Eugene M, eds. (1979). Conway's All the World's Fighting Ships 1860–1905. London: Conway Maritime Press. ISBN 0-85177-133-5.
- Friedman, Norman (2009). British Destroyers: From Earliest Days to the Second World War. Barnsley, UK: Seaforth Publishing. ISBN 978-1-84832-049-9.
- Gardiner, Robert; Gray, Randal, eds. (1985). Conway's All the World's Fighting Ships 1906–1921. London: Conway Maritime Press. ISBN 0-85177-245-5.
- Jane, Fred T. (1969) [first published by Sampson Low Marston, London 1898]. Jane's All the World's Fighting Ships 1898. New York: ARCO Publishing Company.
- Jane, Fred T. (1969) [First published by Sampson Low Marston, London 1905]. Jane's Fighting Ships 1905. New York: ARCO Publishing Company. p. 77.
- Lyon, David (2001) [1996]. The First Destroyers. London: Caxton Editions. ISBN 1-84067-364-8.
- Manning, T. D. (1961). The British Destroyer. London: Putnam & Co. OCLC 6470051.
- Moore, John (1990). Jane's Fighting Ships of World War I. Studio Editions. ISBN 1-85170-378-0.
- Monograph No. 7: The Patrol Flotillas at the Outbreak of the War (PDF). Naval Staff Monographs (Historical). Vol. III. Naval Staff, Training and Staff Duties Division. 1921. pp. 71–107.
- Monograph No. 35: Home Waters: Part IX.: 1st May, 1917 to 31st July, 1917 (PDF). Naval Staff Monographs (Historical). Vol. XIX. Naval Staff, Training and Staff Duties Division. 1939.
