= HMS Whiting (1896) =

Destroyer of the Royal Navy

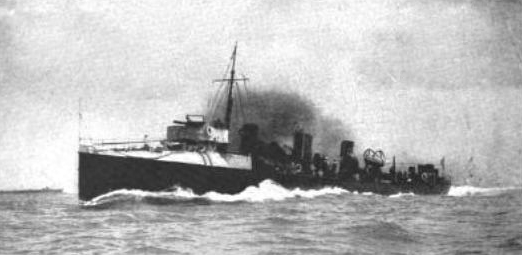

History

United Kingdom
- Name: Whiting
- Ordered: 1895 – 1896 Naval Estimates
- Builder: Palmers Shipbuilding and Iron Company Jarrow-on-Tyne
- Laid down: 13 April 1896
- Launched: 26 August 1896
- Commissioned: June 1897
- Out of service: Laid up in reserve, 1919
- Honours and awards: China 1900
- Fate: Sold for breaking at Hong Kong, 27 November 1919

General characteristics
- Class & type: Palmer three funnel, 30 knot destroyer
- Displacement: 390 long tons (396 t) standard; 420 long tons (427 t) full load
- Length: 219 ft 9 in (66.98 m) o/a
- Beam: 20 ft 9 in (6.32 m)
- Draught: 8 ft 11 in (2.72 m)
- Installed power: 6,000 shp (4,500 kW)
- Propulsion: 4 × Reed water tube boilers; 2 × vertical triple-expansion steam engines; 2 shafts
- Speed: 30 kn (56 km/h)
- Range: 80 tons coal; 1,490 nmi (2,760 km) at 11 kn (20 km/h)
- Complement: 60 officers and men
- Armament: 1 × QF 12-pounder 12 cwt Mark I L/40 naval gun on a P Mark I low angle mount; 5 × QF 6-pdr 8 cwt L/40 naval gun on a Mark I* low angle mount; 2 × single tubes for 18-inch (450mm) torpedoes

Service record
- Operations: World War I 1914 - 1918

HMS Whiting was a Palmer three funnel, 30 knot destroyer ordered by the Royal Navy under the 1896 – 1897 Naval Estimates. She was the fifth ship to carry this name.

== Construction ==
She was laid down on 13 April 1896 at the Palmer shipyard at Jarrow-on-Tyne and launched on 26 August 1896. During her builder's trials she made her contracted speed requirement. She was completed and accepted by the Royal Navy in June 1897.

== Service history ==
=== Pre-War ===
On 26 June 1897 Whiting was present at the Royal Naval Review at Spithead in celebration of Queen Victoria's Diamond Jubilee. In 1897 she was deployed to the China Station and remained there for the rest of her service life.

On 17 June 1900 during the Boxer Rebellion in China, she and Fame were involved in operations against the Taku forts and Chinese destroyers. This resulted in the capture of four Chinese destroyers including Hai Lung (renamed HMS Taku).

Lieutenant Charles Pleydell Mansel was appointed in command in July 1902, but was succeeded by Lieutenant Harry Lionel Wells already the next month, on 18 August 1902. Her boilers were re-tubed and her hull and machinery were refitted in 1903.

During the summer of 1911 she was at Nanking during the Revolution in China and from there she moved on to Kiu Kiang and Hankow.

On 30 August 1912 the Admiralty directed all destroyer classes were to be designated by alpha characters starting with the letter 'A'. Since her design speed was 30-knots and she had three funnels she was assigned to the C class. After 30 September 1913, she was known as a C-class destroyer and had the letter ‘C’ painted on the hull below the bridge area and on either the fore or aft funnel.

=== World War I ===
In August 1914 Whiting was on the disposal list but with the commencement of hostilities she remained on China Station for the duration of the First World War.

On 5 January 1915 General Officer Commanding Hong Kong came on board Triumph to witness two night attacks made by Whiting and Otter; these were primarily designed for training of the searchlight crews of Triumph.

In 1919 she was paid off and laid-up in reserve awaiting disposal. Whiting was sold for breaking on 27 November 1919 in Hong Kong.

She was awarded the Battle Honour "China 1900" for her participation in operations during the Chinese Boxer Rebellion.

== Bibliography ==
- Chesneau, Roger & Kolesnik, Eugene M., eds. (1979). Conway's All The World's Fighting Ships 1860–1905. London: Conway Maritime Press. ISBN 0-85177-133-5.
- Colledge, J. J.; Warlow, Ben (2006) [1969]. Ships of the Royal Navy: The Complete Record of All Fighting Ships of the Royal Navy from the 15th Century to the Present (3rd Rev ed.). London: Chatham Publishing. ISBN 978-1-86176-281-8. OCLC 67375475.
- Dittmar, F. J. & Colledge, J. J. (1972). British Warships 1914–1919. Shepperton, UK: Ian Allan. ISBN 0-7110-0380-7.
- Friedman, Norman (2009). British Destroyers: From Earliest Days to the Second World War. Barnsley, UK: Seaforth Publishing. ISBN 978-1-84832-049-9.
- Gardiner, Robert & Gray, Randal, eds. (1985). Conway's All The World's Fighting Ships 1906–1921. London: Conway Maritime Press. ISBN 0-85177-245-5.
- Lyon, David (2001) [1996]. The First Destroyers. London: Caxton Editions. ISBN 1-84067-3648.
- Manning, T. D. (1961). The British Destroyer. London: Putnam & Co. OCLC 6470051.
- March, Edgar J. (1966). British Destroyers: A History of Development, 1892–1953; Drawn by Admiralty Permission From Official Records & Returns, Ships' Covers & Building Plans. London: Seeley Service. OCLC 164893555.
