= HMS Bittern (1897) =

Destroyer of the Royal Navy

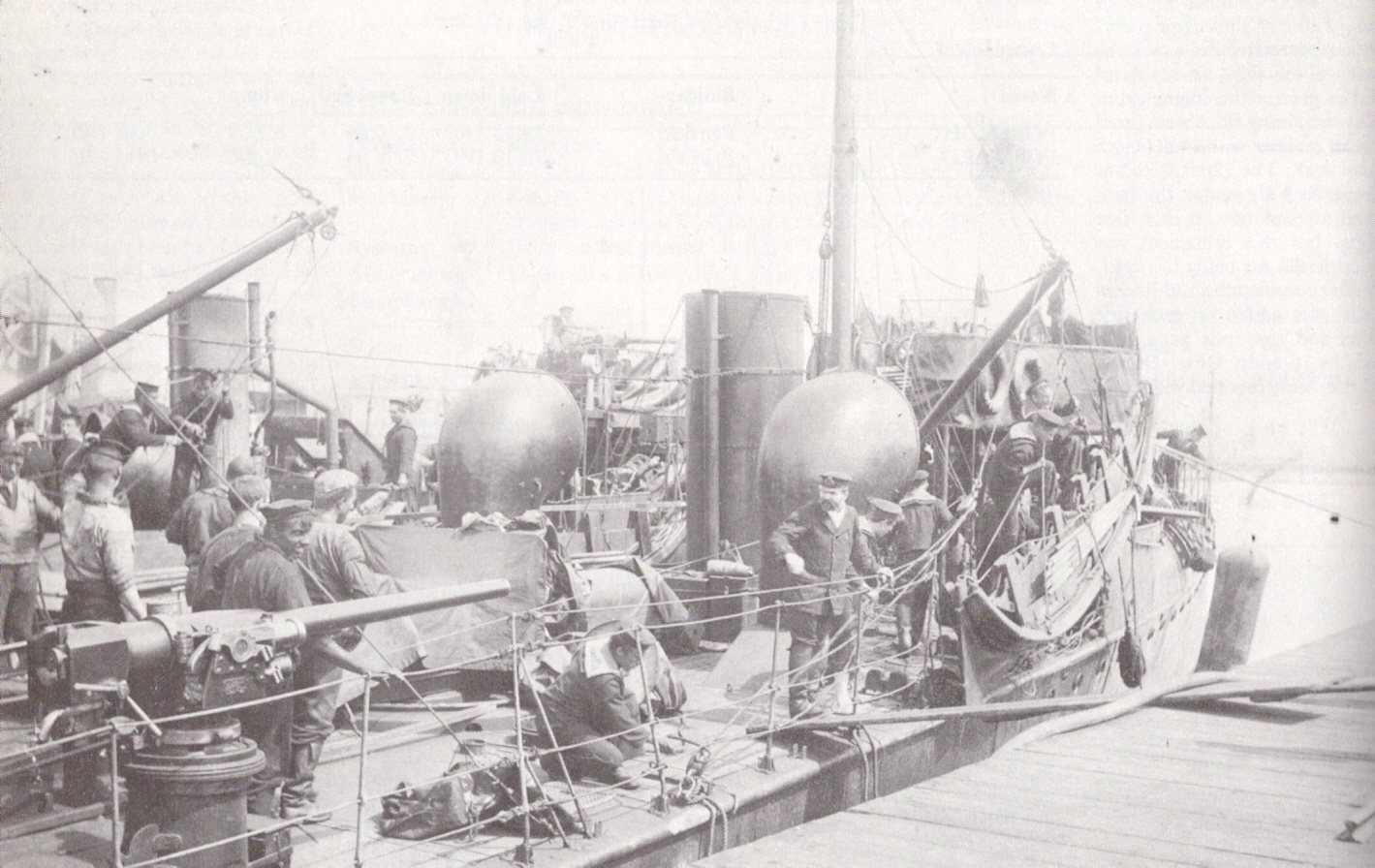
- A close-up of HMS Bittern alongside a pier

History

United Kingdom
- Name: Bittern
- Ordered: 1896 – 1897 Naval Estimates
- Builder: Barrow Shipbuilding Company and Vickers, Sons and Maxim, Barrow-in-Furness
- Laid down: 18 February 1896
- Launched: 1 February 1897
- Commissioned: April 1899
- Fate: 4 April 1918 sunk by collision with merchant ship SS Kenilworth in the English Channel

General characteristics
- Class & type: Vickers three-funnel, 30-knot destroyer
- Displacement: 355 long tons (361 t) standard; 405 long tons (411 t) full load
- Length: 214 ft 3 in (65.30 m) o/a
- Beam: 20 ft (6.1 m)
- Draught: 8 ft 5 in (2.57 m)
- Propulsion: 4 × Thornycroft water tube boiler; 2 × vertical triple expansion (VTE) steam engines driving 2 shafts producing 6,300 shp (4,700 kW)
- Speed: 30 knots (56 km/h)
- Range: 70 tons coal; 1,440 nmi (2,670 km) at 11 kn (20 km/h; 13 mph)
- Complement: 63
- Armament: 1 × QF 12-pounder 12 cwt Mark I L/40 naval gun on a P Mark I Low angle mount; 5 × QF 6-pounder 8 cwt naval gun L/40 Naval gun on a Mark I* low angle mount; 2 × single tubes for 18-inch (450mm) torpedoes

HMS Bittern was a Vickers three-funnel, 30-knot destroyer ordered by the Royal Navy under the 1895 – 1896 Naval Estimates. She was the fourth ship to carry this name since it was introduced in 1796 for an 18-gun sloop, sold in 1833.

== Construction and career ==
She was laid down as yard number 249 on 17 February 1896 at the Barrow Shipbuilding Company shipyard at Barrow-in-Furness and launched on 10 October 1896. During her builder's trials she made her contracted speed requirement. In 1897 during the construction of these ships, the Barrow Shipbuilding Company was purchased by Vickers, Sons and Maxim and renamed as the Naval Construction and Armaments Shipyard. She was completed and accepted by the Royal Navy in January 1899. After commissioning, she was assigned to the Chatham Division of the Harwich Flotilla. She was deployed in Home Waters for her entire service life.

In January 1900 Bittern replaced HMS Haughty in the Medway Instructional flotilla after the latter had a breakdown in her machinery and was paid off for a refit. The following April she was present at an accident at Brighton's West Pier, when seven sailors from HMS Desperate were drowned in bad weather as they approached the pier.

On 30 August 1912 the Admiralty directed all destroyer classes were to be designated by alpha characters starting with the letter 'A'. Since her design speed was 30 knots (56 km/h; 35 mph) and she had three funnels, she was assigned to the C class. After 30 September 1913, she was known as a C-class destroyer and had the letter 'C' painted on the hull below the bridge area and on either the fore or aft funnel.

=== World War I ===
In August 1914 she was in active commission in the Devonport Local Flotilla tendered to HMS Vivid, Royal Navy Barracks. She remained in this deployment until her loss.

==== SS Clan Sutherland ====
On 17 April 1917, the Clan Line's steamship Clan Sutherland was on a voyage from Bombay, India to Glasgow carrying 1,000 tons of manganese ore and 3,000 tons of general cargo. She was 12 nautical miles (22 km) east-southeast of Start Point, Devon, when a torpedo fired by UC-66 struck her starboard side. The 62 crewmen abandoned ship as Clan Sutherland was badly damaged, without power and with her rudder jammed at 15° to port. She was also in danger of breaking in two. HMS Bittern was nearby and rendered assistance with Admiralty tugs Fortitude, Flintshire and Woonda, and HM Armed Trawler Lois. The three tugs began to tow Clan Sutherland to Devonport at a speed of 4 kn (7.4 km/h). When the formation was 9 nautical miles (17 km) from Start Point, Clan Sutherland began to break up. It was decided to beach the foundering steamer at Dartmouth.

It was two days before Captain Calderwood of Clan Sutherland was granted permission from the Admiralty to board his ship. On doing so, he found that the ship had been ransacked and looted. Clan Sutherland was later repaired and returned to service. She was sold to Japan in 1921 and renamed Shinshu Maru.

On 4 April 1918, Bittern was involved in a collision with SS Kenilworth off the Isle of Portland in thick fog. The destroyer was overwhelmed and sank quickly with the loss of all hands. A Court of Inquiry found negligence on the part of the master of SS Kenilworth. His instructions had been to hug the coast as closely as possible from Portland Bill to Start Point. Instead he headed straight across, showing no lights nor sounding for fog. At 0315 Kenilworth saw a red light and a ship 'small and low down' at the moment of impact.

== Salvage award ==
The various parties involved in the saving of Clan Sutherland put in their claims for rewards under salvage rules. Following a Court of Admiralty case concluded on 31 July 1918, Mr Justice Hill awarded £6,000 to the Admiralty, which had coordinated the operation. The crew of Boarhound were awarded £500 to be divided between them. The crews of Lois and Woonda were awarded £360. The crew of Fortitude were awarded £300. Lieutenant Irving of Bittern was awarded £300. Captain Edwards of Lois was awarded £200. The crew of Bittern were awarded £900 to be divided between her then 72-man complement (£12 10s each).

Mr Justice Hill criticised the Admiralty for not allowing Captain Calderwood to return to his ship at the earliest opportunity. Addressing the question of the ship being looted, he laid the blame squarely on the crew of Bittern as only men from that ship had been aboard Clan Sutherland the whole time she was under salvage. Irving was criticised for not exercising proper control over his crew or exercising due diligence in preventing or detecting the thefts. As punishment, he ordered that the crew of Bittern forfeit their salvage reward, regardless of whether or not they had been involved in the looting. Although Lieutenant Irving was cleared of any involvement in the looting, his reward was cut to £100.

== Pennant numbers ==
Pennant number	From	To
D03	6 Dec 1914	1 Sep 1915
D5A	1 Sep 1915	1 Jan 1918
D10	1 Jan 1918	4 Apr 1918

== Bibliography ==
- Chesneau, Roger & Kolesnik, Eugene M., eds. (1979). Conway's All The World's Fighting Ships 1860–1905. London: Conway Maritime Press. ISBN 0-85177-133-5.
- Colledge, J. J.; Warlow, Ben (2006) [1969]. Ships of the Royal Navy: The Complete Record of All Fighting Ships of the Royal Navy from the 15th Century to the Present (3rd Rev ed.). London: Chatham Publishing. ISBN 978-1-86176-281-8. OCLC 67375475.
- Dittmar, F. J. & Colledge, J. J. (1972). British Warships 1914–1919. Shepperton, UK: Ian Allan. ISBN 0-7110-0380-7.
- Friedman, Norman (2009). British Destroyers: From Earliest Days to the Second World War. Barnsley, UK: Seaforth Publishing. ISBN 978-1-84832-049-9.
- Gardiner, Robert & Gray, Randal, eds. (1985). Conway's All The World's Fighting Ships 1906–1921. London: Conway Maritime Press. ISBN 0-85177-245-5.
- Lyon, David (2001) [1996]. The First Destroyers. London: Caxton Editions. ISBN 1-84067-3648.
- Manning, T. D. (1961). The British Destroyer. London: Putnam & Co. OCLC 6470051.
- March, Edgar J. (1966). British Destroyers: A History of Development, 1892–1953; Drawn by Admiralty Permission From Official Records & Returns, Ships' Covers & Building Plans. London: Seeley Service. OCLC 164893555.
