= HMS Chamois (1896) =

Destroyer of the Royal Navy

Coordinates: 38°14′N 21°24′E

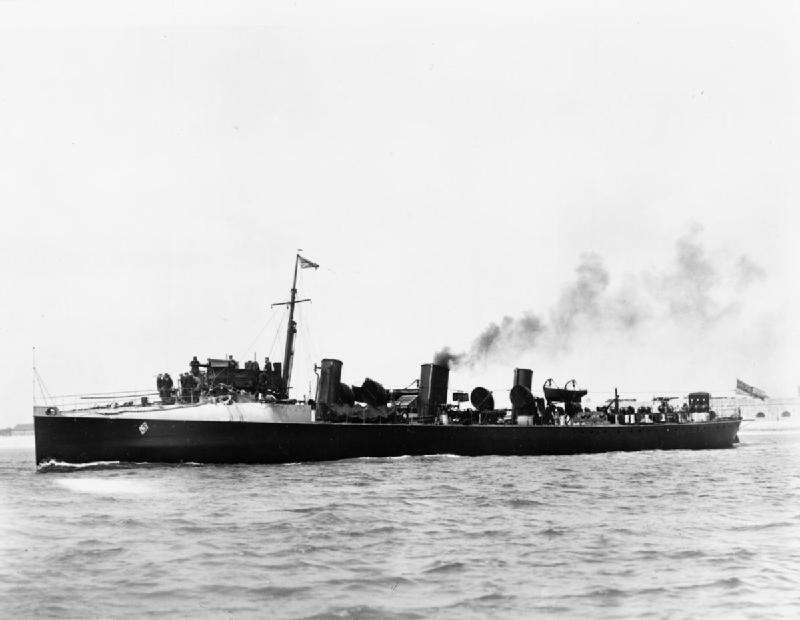
- HMS Chamois

History

United Kingdom
- Name: HMS Chamois
- Ordered: 9 January 1896
- Builder: Palmers Shipbuilding and Iron Company
- Cost: £52,410
- Yard number: 713
- Laid down: 28 May 1896
- Launched: 9 November 1896
- Commissioned: November 1897
- Fate: Foundered in the Gulf of Patras, 26 September 1904

General characteristics
- Class & type: Palmer three-funnel, 30-knot destroyer
- Displacement: 390 long tons (396 t) standard; 440 long tons (447 t) full load
- Length: 219 ft 9 in (66.98 m) o/a
- Beam: 20 ft 9 in (6.32 m)
- Draught: 8 ft 11 in (2.72 m)
- Installed power: 6,000 shp (4,500 kW)
- Propulsion: 4 × Reed water tube boilers; 2 × vertical triple-expansion steam engines; 2 shafts
- Speed: 30 kn (56 km/h)
- Range: 80 tons coal; 1,490 nmi (2,760 km) at 11 kn (20 km/h; 13 mph)
- Complement: 60 officers and men
- Armament: 1 × QF 12-pounder 12 cwt Mark I L/40 naval gun on a P Mark I low angle mount; 5 × QF 6-pdr 8 cwt L/40 naval gun on a Mark I* low angle mount; 2 × single tubes for 18-inch (450mm) torpedoes

HMS Chamois was a Palmer three-funnel, 30-knot destroyer ordered by the Royal Navy under the 1895–1896 Naval Estimates. She was the first ship of the Royal Navy to carry this name. She was commissioned in 1897 and served in both the Channel and the Mediterranean. She foundered in 1904 after her own propeller pierced her hull.

== Construction ==
She was laid down on 28 May 1896 as yard number 713 at the Palmer shipyard at Jarrow-on-Tyne and launched on 9 November 1896. During her builder's trials she met her contracted speed requirement. Chamois was completed and accepted by the Royal Navy in November 1897.

== Service ==
Chamois returned to Portsmouth with her shaft bent in early 1900. She was commissioned for service in the Channel Fleet on 15 March 1900, but he and the crew transferred to HMS Sylvia only days later as the Chamois needed further repairs. She was re-commissioned at Portsmouth on 5 September 1901, with the crew of Albatross, to replace that vessel on the Mediterranean Station. She was later deployed as a tender to the destroyer depot ship HMS Leander at Malta. In September 1902 she visited Nauplia and Souda Bay with other ships of the fleet, and in early January 1903 there was a similar three-weeks cruise in the Greek islands around Corfu.

== Loss ==
On 26 September 1904, she was the victim of a bizarre accident. While conducting a full-power trial in the Gulf of Patras off the Greek coast she lost a propeller blade. The loss of the blade unbalanced the shaft, which was spinning at high speed. The resulting vibration broke the shaft bracket and tore a large hole in the hull. She sank by the stern in 30 fathoms (55 m) of water about 2 nautical miles (3.7 km) from the coast north of the modern village of Araxos. All hands were saved, but two men were injured with one of them dying the following day.

== Bibliography ==
- Chesneau, Roger & Kolesnik, Eugene M., eds. (1979). Conway's All The World's Fighting Ships 1860–1905. London: Conway Maritime Press. ISBN 0-85177-133-5.
- Colledge, J. J.; Warlow, Ben (2006) [1969]. Ships of the Royal Navy: The Complete Record of All Fighting Ships of the Royal Navy from the 15th Century to the Present (3rd Rev ed.). London: Chatham Publishing. ISBN 978-1-86176-281-8. OCLC 67375475.
- Dittmar, F. J. & Colledge, J. J. (1972). British Warships 1914–1919. Shepperton, UK: Ian Allan. ISBN 0-7110-0380-7.
- Friedman, Norman (2009). British Destroyers: From Earliest Days to the Second World War. Barnsley, UK: Seaforth Publishing. ISBN 978-1-84832-049-9.
- Gardiner, Robert & Gray, Randal, eds. (1985). Conway's All The World's Fighting Ships 1906–1921. London: Conway Maritime Press. ISBN 0-85177-245-5.
- Lyon, David (2001) [1996]. The First Destroyers. London: Caxton Editions. ISBN 1-84067-3648.
- Manning, T. D. (1961). The British Destroyer. London: Putnam & Co. OCLC 6470051.
- March, Edgar J. (1966). British Destroyers: A History of Development, 1892–1953; Drawn by Admiralty Permission From Official Records & Returns, Ships' Covers & Building Plans. London: Seeley Service. OCLC 164893555.
