= HMS Otter (1896) =

Destroyer of the Royal Navy

History

United Kingdom
- Name: Otter
- Ordered: 1895 – 1896 Naval Estimates
- Builder: Barrow Shipbuilding Company and Vickers, Sons and Maxim, Barrow-in-Furness
- Laid down: 9 June 1896
- Launched: 23 November 1896
- Commissioned: 27 March 1900
- Out of service: Laid up in 1916
- Fate: 25 October 1916 sold for breaking in Hong Kong

General characteristics
- Class & type: Vickers three-funnel, 30-knot destroyer
- Displacement: 355 long tons (361 t) standard; 400 long tons (406 t) full load
- Length: 214 ft 3 in (65.30 m) o/a
- Beam: 20 ft (6.1 m)
- Draught: 8 ft 5 in (2.57 m)
- Propulsion: 4 × Thornycroft water tube boiler; 2 × Vertical Triple Expansion (VTE) steam engines driving 2 shafts producing 6,300 shp (4,700 kW)
- Speed: 30 kn (56 km/h)
- Range: 70 tons coal; 1,440 nmi (2,670 km) at 11 kn (20 km/h; 13 mph)
- Complement: 63
- Armament: 1 × QF 12-pounder 12 cwt Mark I L/40 naval gun on a P Mark I Low angle mount; 5 × QF 6-pdr 8 cwt naval gun L/40 Naval gun on a Mark I* low angle mount; 2 × single tubes for 18-inch (450mm) torpedoes

HMS Otter was a Vickers three-funnel, 30-knot destroyer ordered by the Royal Navy under the 1895–1896 Naval Estimates. She was the fourth ship to carry this name since it was introduced in 1782 for a fire ship, sold in 1801.

== Construction and career ==
She was laid down on 9 June 1896, at the Barrow Shipbuilding Company shipyard at Barrow-in-Furness, and launched on 23 November 1896. During her builder's trials she made her contracted speed requirement. In 1897 during the construction of these ships, the Barrow Shipbuilding Company was purchases by Vickers, Sons and Maxim and renamed as the Naval Construction and Armaments Shipyard. She was completed and accepted by the Royal Navy in March 1900. Otter was commissioned at Devonport on 27 March 1900 for the China Station, serving as tender to HMS Goliath on her way out. Her temporary officer in command for the voyage was Lieutenant Henry Douglas Wilkin. She arrived at the station after the Boxer Rebellion operations were completed, and was based at Hong Kong.

Her boilers were re-tubed and her hull and machinery refitted in 1902.

On 30 August 1912 the Admiralty directed all destroyer classes were to be designated by alpha characters starting with the letter 'A'. Since her design speed was 30 knots (56 km/h; 35 mph) and she had three funnels, she was assigned to the C class. After 30 September 1913, she was known as a C-class destroyer and had the letter 'C' painted on the hull below the bridge area and on either the fore or aft funnel.

=== World War I ===
In August 1914 she was slated for disposal but the outbreak of the First World War granted her a reprieve.

On 5 January 1915, General Officer Commanding (GOC) Hong Kong came on board HMS Triumph to witness two night attacks made by HMS Whiting and HMS Otter; these were primarily designed for training of the searchlight crews of HMS Triumph.

In 1916 she was paid off and laid-up in awaiting disposal. She was finally sold on 25 October 1916 for breaking in Hong Kong.

== Pennant numbers ==
It is unknown if she was assigned a pennant number as no record has been found.

== Bibliography ==
- Chesneau, Roger & Kolesnik, Eugene M., eds. (1979). Conway's All The World's Fighting Ships 1860–1905. London: Conway Maritime Press. ISBN 0-85177-133-5.
- Colledge, J. J.; Warlow, Ben (2006) [1969]. Ships of the Royal Navy: The Complete Record of All Fighting Ships of the Royal Navy from the 15th Century to the Present (3rd Rev ed.). London: Chatham Publishing. ISBN 978-1-86176-281-8. OCLC 67375475.
- Dittmar, F. J. & Colledge, J. J. (1972). British Warships 1914–1919. Shepperton, UK: Ian Allan. ISBN 0-7110-0380-7.
- Friedman, Norman (2009). British Destroyers: From Earliest Days to the Second World War. Barnsley, UK: Seaforth Publishing. ISBN 978-1-84832-049-9.
- Gardiner, Robert & Gray, Randal, eds. (1985). Conway's All The World's Fighting Ships 1906–1921. London: Conway Maritime Press. ISBN 0-85177-245-5.
- Lyon, David (2001) [1996]. The First Destroyers. London: Caxton Editions. ISBN 1-84067-3648.
- Manning, T. D. (1961). The British Destroyer. London: Putnam & Co. OCLC 6470051.
- March, Edgar J. (1966). British Destroyers: A History of Development, 1892–1953; Drawn by Admiralty Permission From Official Records & Returns, Ships' Covers & Building Plans. London: Seeley Service. OCLC 164893555.
