= List of ship launches in 1897 =

The list of ship launches in 1897 includes a chronological list of some ships launched in 1897.

Date	Ship	Class / type	Builder	Location	Country	Notes
4 January	Harald Haarfagre	Tordenskjold-class coastal defence ship	Armstrong Whitworth	Elswick	United Kingdom	For Kongelig Norske Marine
5 January	Delphic	Ocean liner	Harland and Wolff	Belfast	United Kingdom	For White Star Line
21 January	Panther	Earnest-class destroyer	Laird, Son & Co	Birkenhead	United Kingdom	For Royal Navy
23 January	Goorkha	Passenger ship	Harland & Wolff	Belfast	United Kingdom	For Union Steamship Co.
1 February	Bittern	Avon-class destroyer	Vickers	Barrow in Furness	United Kingdom	For Royal Navy
6 February	Audaz	Furor-class destroyer	Clydebank Engineering & Shipbuilding Company	Clydebank	United Kingdom	For Spanish Navy
14 February	Nahma	Steam yacht	Clydebank Engine and Shipbuilding Company	Clydebank	United Kingdom	For Robert Walton Goelet
18 February	Rotterdam	Ocean liner	Harland & Wolff	Belfast	United Kingdom	For Holland America Line
20 February	Niobe	Diadem-class cruiser	Vickers	Barrow in Furness	United Kingdom	For Royal Navy
4 March	Flying Fish	Star-class destroyer	Palmers Shipbuilding and Iron Company	Jarrow	United Kingdom	For Royal Navy
4 March	Pegasus	Pelorus-class cruiser	Palmers Shipbuilding and Iron Company	Jarrow	United Kingdom	For Royal Navy
4 March	Empress Queen	Passenger paddle steamer	Fairfield Shipbuilding and Engineering Company	Govan	United Kingdom	For Isle of Man Steam Packet Company
6 March	Seal	Earnest-class destroyer	Laird, Son & Co	Birkenhead	United Kingdom	For Royal Navy
9 March	Gipsy	Gipsy-class destroyer	Fairfield Shipbuilding and Engineering Company	Govan	United Kingdom	For Royal Navy
18 March	Coblenz	Cargo liner	Blohm & Voss	Hamburg	Germany	For Norddeutscher Lloyd
18 March	Marietta	Gunboat	Union Iron Works	San Francisco, California	United States	For United States Navy
18 March	Tordenskjold	Tordenskjold-class coastal defence ship	Armstrong Whitworth	Elswick	United Kingdom	For Kongelig Norske Marine
19 March	Cardenal Cisneros	Princesa de Asturias-class armored cruiser	Reales Astilleros de Esteiro	Ferrol	Spain	For Spanish Navy
20 March	Europa	Diadem-class cruiser	J & G Thompson	Clydebank	United Kingdom	For Royal Navy
20 March	Leopard	Avon-class destroyer	Vickers	Barrow in Furness	United Kingdom	For Royal Navy
20 March	Maylands	Collier	Furness, Withy and Company	West Hartlepool	United Kingdom	For J F Wilson & Co
30 March	Du Pont	Torpedo boat	Herreshoff Manufacturing Co.	Bristol, Rhode Island	United States	For United States Navy
7 April	Osprey	Gipsy-class destroyer	Fairfield Shipbuilding and Engineering Company	Govan	United Kingdom	For Royal Navy
14 April	Hertha	Victoria Louise-class cruiser	AG Vulcan	Stettin	Germany	For Kaiserliche Marine
27 April	Freya	Victoria Louise-class cruiser	Kaiserliche Werft	Danzig	Germany	For Kaiserliche Marine
29 April	Ammiraglio di Saint Bon	Ammiraglio di Saint Bon-class battleship	Venetian Arsenal	Venice	Kingdom of Italy	For Regia Marina
3 May	Violet	Violet-class destroyer	William Doxford and Sons	Sunderland	United Kingdom	For Royal Navy
4 May	Kaiser Wilhelm der Grosse	Ocean liner	AG Vulcan	Stettin	Germany	For Norddeutscher Lloyd
6 May	Osado	Furor-class destroyer	Clydebank Engineering & Shipbuilding Company	Clydebank	United Kingdom	For Spanish Navy
8 May	Winslow	Torpedo boat	Columbian Iron Works and Dry Dock Co.	Baltimore, Maryland	United States	For United States Navy
15 May	Flirt	Star-class destroyer	Palmers Shipbuilding and Iron Company	Jarrow	United Kingdom	For Royal Navy
15 May	Atlas	Barge	Frederick Braby & Co. Ltd.	Deptford	United Kingdom	For Frederick Braby & Co. Ltd.
15 May	Pyramus	Pelorus-class cruiser	Palmers Shipbuilding and Iron Company	Jarrow	United Kingdom	For Royal Navy
17 May	Holland	Submarine	Crescent Shipyard	Elizabeth, New Jersey	United States	For United States Navy
17 May	Montcalm	Cargo liner	Palmers Shipbuilding and Iron Company	Jarrow	United Kingdom	For African Steamship Company
18 May	Dauntless	Steamship	Blyth Shipbuilding Co. Ltd	Blyth	United Kingdom	For Steamship Dauntless Co. Ltd.
18 May	Takasago	Protected cruiser	Armstrong Whitworth	Elswick	United Kingdom	For Imperial Japanese Navy
29 May	Fairy	Gipsy-class destroyer	Fairfield Shipbuilding and Engineering Company	Govan	United Kingdom	For Royal Navy
29 May	Kenthales	Steam yacht	Ramage and Ferguson	Leith	United Kingdom	For William Johnston
2 June	Wolf	Earnest-class destroyer	Laird, Son & Co	Birkenhead	United Kingdom	For Royal Navy
3 June	Princeton	Gunboat	J. H. Dialogue and Son	Camden, New Jersey	United States	For United States Navy
5 June	Briton	Passenger ship	Harland & Wolff	Belfast	United Kingdom	For Union Steamship Line.
14 June	Active	sloop	Brown & Clapson	Barton-upon-Humber	United Kingdom	For Henry Oldridge.
17 June	Montrose	Ocean Liner	Sir Raylton Dixon and Company	Middlesbrough	United Kingdom	For Elder Dempster Line
3 July	Sylvia	Violet-class destroyer	William Doxford and Sons	Sunderland	United Kingdom	For Royal Navy
13 July	Plutón	Furor-class destroyer	Clydebank Engineering & Shipbuilding Company	Clydebank	United Kingdom	For Spanish Navy
14 July	Cheerful	Mermaid-class destroyer	Hawthorn Leslie and Company	Hebburn	United Kingdom	For Royal Navy
15 July	Perseus	Pelorus-class cruiser	Earle's Shipbuilding	Kingston upon Hull	United Kingdom	For Royal Navy
21 July	Derbyshire	Passenger ship	Harland & Wolff	Belfast	United Kingdom	For Bibby Steamship Co.
7 August	Plunger	Submarine	Columbian Iron Works and Dry Dock Co.	Baltimore, Maryland	United States	For United States Navy (not commissioned)
8 August	Creole	Passenger ship	Newport News Shipbuilding & Drydock Co.	Newport News, Virginia	United States	For Cromwell Steamship Lines
13 August	Craigneuk	Steamship	Blyth Shipbuilding Co. Ltd	Blyth	United Kingdom	For Craig Line Steamship Co. Ltd.
17 August	Batavier II	Passenger ship	Gourlay Brothers	Dundee	United Kingdom	For Batavier Line
18 August	Zenta	Zenta-class cruiser	Pola Naval Arsenal	Pola	Austria-Hungary	For Kaiserliche und Königliche Kriegsmarine
31 August	Presidente Sarmiento	Training ship	Laird & Company	Birkenhead	United Kingdom	For Armada de la República Argentina
11 September	Winifreda	Passenger ship	Harland & Wolff	Belfast	United Kingdom	For F. Leyland & Co.
12 September	Leinster	Passenger ship	Cammell Laird	Birkenhead	United Kingdom	For City of Dublin Steam Packet Company
14 September	Kaiser Wilhelm II	Kaiser Friedrich III-class battleship	Kaiserliche Werft	Wilhelmshaven	Germany	For Kaiserliche Marine
23 September	Westralia	Cargo liner	Sir J Laing and Sons	Sunderland	United Kingdom	For Huddart Parker
25 September	Fürst Bismarck	Armoured cruiser	Kaiserliche Werft	Kiel	Germany	For Kaiserliche Marine
29 September	Emanuele Filiberto	Ammiraglio di Saint Bon-class battleship	Castellammare Royal Dockyard	Castellammare di Stabia	Kingdom of Italy	For Regia Marina
9 October	Pretoria	Ocean liner	Blohm & Voss	Hamburg	Germany	For Hamburg-Amerikanische Paketfahrt AG
12 October	Cymric	Ocean liner	Harland and Wolff	Belfast	United Kingdom	For White Star Line
13 October	Canopus	Canopus-class battleship	Portsmouth Dockyard	Portsmouth	United Kingdom	For Royal Navy
23 October	Proserpina	Furor-class destroyer	Clydebank Engineering & Shipbuilding Company	Clydebank	United Kingdom	For Spanish Navy
24 October	Duchess	Steamship	Allsup & Co. Ltd.	Preston	United Kingdom	For Cuthbert J. Pyke.
26 October	Guichen	Cruiser	Ateliers et Chantiers de la Loire	Saint-Nazaire	France	For French Navy
27 October	D'Estrées	D'Estrées-class cruiser	Arsenal de Rochefort	Rochefort	France	For Marine Nationale
1 November	Fuji	Fuji-class battleship	Thames Ironworks and Shipbuilding Company	Leamouth, London	United Kingdom	For Imperial Japanese Navy
4 November	Plutón	Audaz-class destroyer	Thompson	Clydebank	United Kingdom	For Armada Española
10 November	Arabia	Ocean liner	Caird & Co	Greenock	United Kingdom	For Peninsular and Oriental Steam Navigation Company
14 November	Talbot	Torpedo boat	Herreshoff Manufacturing Co.	Bristol, Rhode Island	United States	For United States Navy
15 November	Gwin	Torpedo boat	Herreshoff Manufacturing Co.	Bristol, Rhode Island	United States	For United States Navy
18 November	Rossland	Paddle steamer	Thomas J Bulger	Naksup, British Columbia	Canada	For Canadian Pacific Railway
25 November	Pomone	Pelorus-class cruiser	Sheerness Dockyard	Sheerness	United Kingdom	For Royal Navy
27 November	Brasilia	Passenger ship	Harland & Wolff	Belfast	United Kingdom	For Hamburg America Line.
9 December	Vindictive	Protected cruiser	Chatham Dockyard	Chatham	United Kingdom	For Royal Navy
9 December	Vineta	Victoria Louise-class cruiser	Kaiserliche Werft	Danzig	Germany	For Kaiserliche Marine
11 December	Knight Errant	Cargo ship	Charles Connell and Company	Scotstoun	United Kingdom	For Knight Steamship Company
18 December	Akashi	Suma-class cruiser	Yokosuka Naval Arsenal	Yokosuka, Kanagawa	Japan	For Imperial Japanese Navy
Unknown date	Bernice	Steam yacht		Brooklyn, New York	United States	
Unknown date	Coyote	Motorboat			United States	For Sylvester Sparling
Unknown date	Hai Yung	Protected cruiser	AG Vulcan	Stettin	Germany	For Chinese Navy
Unknown date	J.D. Farrell	Paddle steamer		Jennings, Montana	United States	For Kootenay River Navigation Company
Unknown date	Keenora	Passenger ship			Canada	
Unknown date	Mayflower	Lighthouse tender	Bath Iron Works	Bath, Maine	United States	For U.S. Lighthouse Service
Unknown date	North Star	Paddle steamer	Louis Pacquet	Jennings, Montana	United States	For Upper Colombia Navigation & Tramway Co.
Unknown date	Olive	Merchantman	Allsup & Co. Ltd.	Preston	United Kingdom	For private owner.
Unknown date	Vigilant	Steamboat	Allsup & Co. Ltd.	Preston	United Kingdom	For private owner.
Unknown date	White Cross	Steamship	Abdela & Mitchell Ltd.	Brimscombe	United Kingdom	For Managers of the Metropolitan Asylum District.
Unknown date	Wilmot	Tug	F. W. Wheeler Company	Bay City, Michigan	United States	For Ocean Towing and Wrecking Company
Unknown date	Winthrop	Tug	Charles Hillman	Philadelphia, Pennsylvania	United States	For Staples Coal Co
