= HMS Leven (1898) =

Destroyer of the Royal Navy

History

United Kingdom
- Name: HMS Leven
- Ordered: 1897 – 1898 Naval Estimates
- Builder: Fairfield Shipbuilding and Engineering Company, Govan, Glasgow
- Laid down: 24 January 1898
- Launched: 28 June 1898
- Commissioned: July 1899
- Out of service: Paid off, 1919
- Fate: Sold for breaking, 14 September 1920

General characteristics
- Class & type: Fairfield "30 knotter" destroyer
- Displacement: 370 long tons (376 t) light; 420 long tons (427 t) full load
- Length: 215 ft 6 in (65.68 m) oa; 209 ft 9 in (63.93 m) pp
- Beam: 21 ft 0 1/4 in (6.41 m)
- Draught: 8 ft 2 in (2.5 m)
- Installed power: 6,300 ihp (4,700 kW)
- Propulsion: 4 × Thornycroft water tube boilers; 2× vertical triple-expansion steam engines; 2 × shafts
- Speed: 30 kn (56 km/h; 35 mph)
- Complement: 63 officers and men
- Armament: 1 × QF 12-pounder 12 cwt Mark I L/40 naval gun; 5 × QF 6-pounder 8 cwt L/40 naval gun; 2 × single tubes for 18-inch (450mm) torpedoes

Service record
- Operations: World War I 1914 - 1918
- Awards: Battle honour "Belgian Coast 1914–16"

HMS Leven was a Fairfield "30-knotter" destroyer of the Royal Navy, later classified as part of the C class. It was built in 1898–1899, and served with the Royal Navy through to the First World War, sinking a German U-boat in 1918. Leven was sold for scrapping in 1920.

== Construction ==
HMS Leven was ordered from the Fairfield Shipbuilding and Engineering Company, Govan, Glasgow, as part of the British Admiralty's 1897–1898 shipbuilding programme, one of six "Thirty-Knotter" destroyers ordered in that programme, at a contract cost of £52,407. As with other early Royal Navy destroyers, the design of Leven was left to the builder, with the Admiralty laying down only broad requirements.

Leven's design was a near repeat of the three Thirty-Knotters (Fairey, Falcon and Gipsy) ordered as part of the previous 1896–1897 construction programme, with four Thornycroft boilers feeding a triple-expansion steam engine, and three funnels being fitted. The ship had the standard armament of the Thirty-Knotters, i.e. a QF 12 pounder 12 cwt (3 in (76 mm) calibre) gun on a platform on the ship's conning tower (in practice the platform was also used as the ship's bridge), with a secondary armament of five 6-pounder guns, and two 18-inch (450 mm) torpedo tubes.

Leven was laid down as Yard No 405 on 24 January 1898 and launched on 28 June 1898. During her builder's trials the ship made its contracted speed requirement. She was completed and accepted by the Royal Navy in July 1898, and was the third ship to carry this name since it was introduced in 1813 for a 20-gun sixth rate in service until 1848.

== Operational history ==
=== Pre-war ===
Leven served in British home waters for the whole of her career. She was commissioned to replace HMS Bat in the Devonport instructional flotilla in March 1900, receiving that ship's crew under Commander Pennant Lloyd. She participated in the 1901 British Naval Manoeuvres. She served in the Devonport instructional flotilla, until replaced in March 1902. Later that year, she underwent repairs to re-tube her boilers.

On 30 August 1912 the Admiralty directed all destroyers were to be grouped into classes designated by letters based on contract speed and appearance. As a three-funneled destroyer with a contract speed of 30 knots, Leven was assigned to the C class. The class letters were painted on the hull below the bridge area and on a funnel.

=== World War I ===
From August 1914 to November 1918 Leven was deployed in the 6th Destroyer Flotilla based at Dover. While employed with the 6th Flotilla she conducted counter-mining patrols escorted merchant ships, defended the Dover Barrage and took part in operations off the Belgian Coast.

On 8 September 1915, Leven was involved in a collision with a transport in the English Channel, suffering a badly damaged bow. She was towed stern first back to Dover. On 26 May 1917 Leven was escorting the monitors General Wolfe, M24 and M27 when they encountered four German torpedo boats. One of the German ships fired a torpedo at M24, which missed, and after they were engaged by Leven, the Germans broke contact.

On 26 January 1918, Leven, carrying out a courier service between Dover and Dunkirk, spotted the periscope of the German submarine UB-35, when UB-35 was attempting to pass through the Dover Barrage, a series of anti-submarine minefields and anti-submarine patrols. Leven sank UB-35 with depth charges about 6 miles north-west of Calais, (Note: In the approximate position 51°03′N 001°46′E) rescuing a single survivor, who identified that the sunken submarine was UB-35 before he died.

In 1919 Leven was paid off and laid-up in reserve awaiting disposal. The ship was sold on 14 September 1920 to Hayes of Porthcawl for scrapping. Leven was awarded the battle honour "Belgian Coast 1914–16" for her service.

== Pennant numbers ==
Pennant number	From	To
P33	6 December 1914	1 September 1915
D62	1 September 1915	1 January 1918
D51	1 January 1918	17 Mar 1921

== Bibliography ==
- Brassey, T.A. (1902). The Naval Annual 1902. Portsmouth, UK: J. Griffin and Co.
- Chesneau, Roger & Kolesnik, Eugene M., eds. (1979). Conway's All The World's Fighting Ships 1860–1905. London: Conway Maritime Press. ISBN 0-85177-133-5.
- Colledge, J. J.; Warlow, Ben (2006) [1969]. Ships of the Royal Navy: The Complete Record of All Fighting Ships of the Royal Navy from the 15th Century to the Present (3rd Rev ed.). London: Chatham Publishing. ISBN 978-1-86176-281-8. OCLC 67375475.
- Dittmar, F. J. & Colledge, J. J. (1972). British Warships 1914–1919. Shepperton, UK: Ian Allan. ISBN 0-7110-0380-7.
- Friedman, Norman (2009). British Destroyers: From Earliest Days to the Second World War. Barnsley, UK: Seaforth Publishing. ISBN 978-1-84832-049-9.
- Gardiner, Robert & Gray, Randal, eds. (1985). Conway's All The World's Fighting Ships 1906–1921. London: Conway Maritime Press. ISBN 0-85177-245-5.
- Grant, Robert M. (1964). U-Boats Destroyed: the Effect of Anti-Submarine Warfare 1914–1918. London: Putnam.
- Hepper, David; Conway, Michael S. (June 2021). "Question 18/57". Warship International. LVIII (2): 100–101. ISSN 0043-0374.
- Jane, Fred T. (1969) [1st. pub. Sampson Low & Marston, London]. Jane's All the World's Fighting Ships 1898. New York: ARCO Publishing Company.
- Keyes, Roger (1935). The Naval Memoirs of Admiral of the Fleet Sir Roger Keyes: Volume 2: Scapa Flow to the Dover Straits. Taylor & Francis.
- Lyon, David (2001) [1996]. The First Destroyers. London: Caxton Editions. ISBN 1-84067-3648.
- Manning, T. D. (1961). The British Destroyer. London: Putnam & Co. OCLC 6470051.
- March, Edgar J. (1966). British Destroyers: A History of Development, 1892–1953; Drawn by Admiralty Permission From Official Records & Returns, Ships' Covers & Building Plans. London: Seeley Service. OCLC 164893555.
- McCartney, Innes (2003). Lost Patrols: Submarine Wrecks of the English Channel. Penzance, UK: Periscope Publishing Ltd. ISBN 1-904381-04-9.
- Monograph No. 35: Home Waters—Part IX.: 1st May, 1917 to 31st July, 1917 (PDF). Naval Staff Monographs (Historical). Vol. XIX. The Naval Staff, Training and Staff Duties Division. 1939.
- Lyon, David (2001). The First Destroyers. London: Caxton Editions. ISBN 1-84067-3648.
- Moore, John (1990). Jane's Fighting Ships of World War I. London: Studio Editions. ISBN 1-85170-378-0.
