= HMS Fairy =

Several ships of the Royal Navy have been named HMS Fairy:

- HMS Fairy (1778), a 16-gun Swan-class ship sloop, built in 1778 at Sheerness, and broken up in 1811.
- HMS Fairy (1812), an 18-gun Cruizer-class brig-sloop, built in 1812 at Bideford and broken up in 1821.
- HMS Fairy (1826), a 10-gun Cherokee-class brig-sloop, built in 1826 at Chatham, and lost in 1840.
- HMS Fairy (1897), a Gipsy-class destroyer built by Fairfields of Glasgow, launched on 29 May 1897, which foundered on 31 May 1918 after ramming and sinking the German U-boat UC-75.
- HMS Fairy (J403), an Auk-class minesweeper built by Associated Shipbuilders, Seattle, launched on 5 April 1943, and loaned to the Royal Navy under Lend-Lease. Commissioned on 24 March 1944, she was returned to the United States Navy on 13 December 1946.

== Also ==
- HMY Fairy, an iron-hulled steam screw yacht which acted as tender to the Royal Yacht HMY Victoria and Albert (1843). Built in 1844, Fairy was commissioned in 1845, and broken up in 1868.
- A dockyard tug Fairy was sold in an Admiralty auction at Portsmouth on 7 October 1913 to John Deheer Ltd of Hull.
