= HMS Violet =

Seven ships of the Royal Navy have borne the name HMS Violet, after the flower of the genus viola:

- English ship Violet (1588) was a ship present in the fleet sent against the Spanish Armada in 1588. She may have been a hired vessel.
- English ship Violet (1652) was a 44-gun ship captured in 1652 and broken up in 1672.
- HMS Violet (1806) was a lugger transferred from HM Customs in 1806 and broken up in 1812.
- HMS Violet (1835) was a tender purchased in 1835 and sold in 1842.
- HMS Violet (1845) was an iron paddle packet ship launched in 1845 and sold in 1854.
- HMS Violet (1856) was an Albacore-class wood screw gunboat launched in 1856 and sold in 1864.
- HMS Violet (1897) was a Violet-class destroyer launched in 1897, reclassified as a C-class destroyer in 1913 and sold in 1920.
- HMS Violet (K35) was a Flower-class corvette launched in 1940 and sold into mercantile service in 1947.
