= Gipsy-class destroyer =

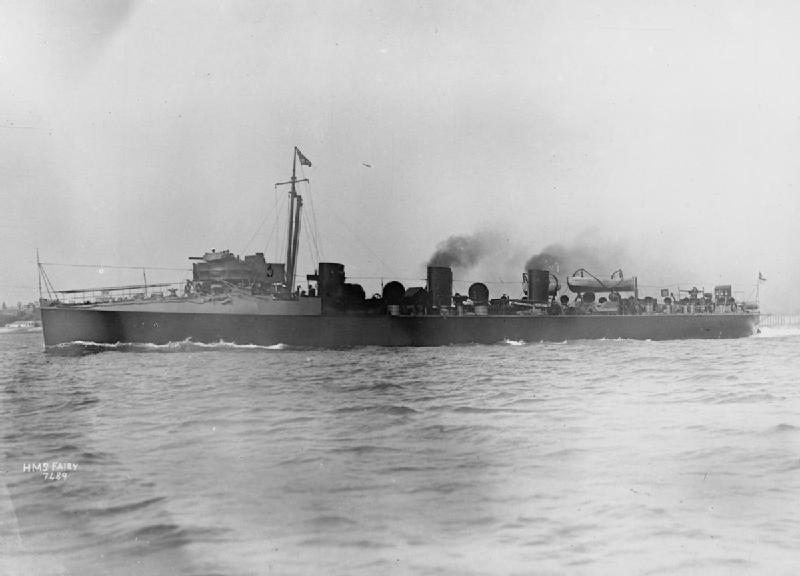
- HMS Fairy

Class overview
- Name: Gipsy class
- Builders: Fairfield Shipbuilding and Engineering Company, Govan, Scotland
- Operators: Royal Navy
- Built: 1896–1901
- In commission: 1895–1919
- Completed: 6
- Lost: 2
- Scrapped: 4

General characteristics
- Type: Torpedo boat destroyer
- Displacement: 350 long tons (356 t)
- Length: 209.75 ft (63.93 m)
- Beam: 21 ft (6.4 m)
- Draught: 8 ft 2 in (2.5 m)
- Propulsion: Triple expansion steam engines; Coal-fired Normand boilers; 6,300 hp (4,698 kW)
- Speed: 30 knots (56 km/h; 35 mph)
- Complement: 63
- Armament: 1 × QF 12-pounder gun; 2 × 18 inch (450 mm) torpedo tubes

Three Gipsy-class destroyers served with the Royal Navy; Osprey, Fairy and Gipsy were three funnelled 30-knot (56 km/h) C-class destroyers built by Fairfield with Thorneycroft boilers. Leven, Falcon and Ostrich are sometime referred to as the Falcon class but are here listed under the Gipsy class. These 209-foot (64 m) long ships were armed with the standard 12-pounder gun and two torpedo tubes and all served in the First World War in home waters.

== Ships ==
Name	Launched	Fate
Osprey	7 April 1897	Broken up in 1919
Fairy	29 May 1897	Foundered 1918
Gipsy	9 March 1897	Sold 1921
Leven	28 June 1898	Broken up in 1920
Falcon	29 December 1899	Collided with another vessel in 1918
Ostrich	22 March 1900	Broken up in 1920

== See also ==
Media related to Gipsy class destroyer at Wikimedia Commons
