= SS Egypt =

Ocean liner which sunk in 1922

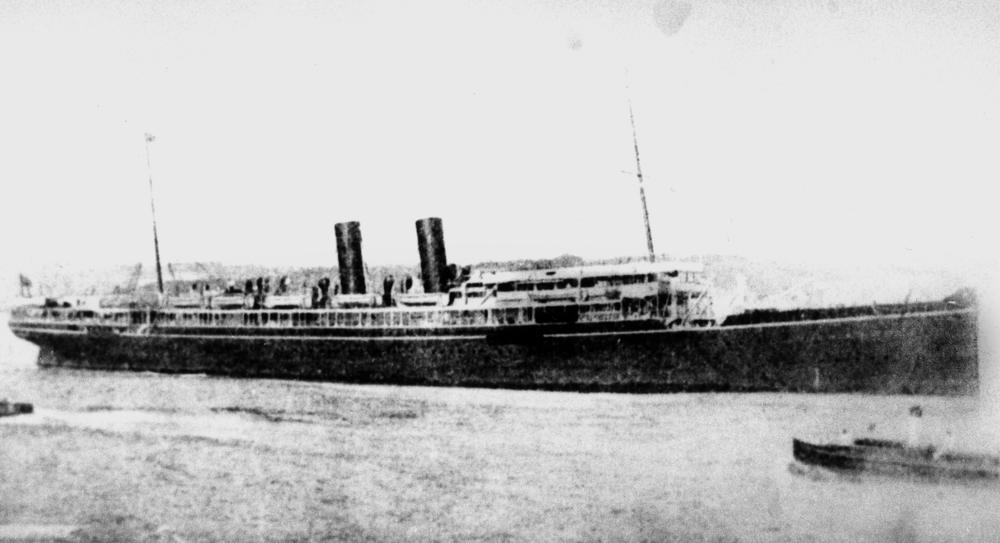

History
- Name: Egypt
- Namesake: Egypt
- Owner: P&O Steam Navigation Co
- Operator: P&O Steam Navigation Co
- Port of registry: (United Kingdom) London
- Route: Tilbury – Bombay
- Builder: Caird & Company, Greenock
- Yard number: 285
- Launched: 15 May 1897
- Identification: UK official number 105581; code letters PTGD
- Fate: Sunk in collision 20 May 1922

General characteristics
- Tonnage: 7,912 GRT; 4,179 NRT
- Length: 499.9 ft (152.4 m)
- Beam: 54.3 feet (16.6 m)
- Draught: 26 feet 9 inches (8.15 m)
- Depth: 24.5 feet (7.5 m)
- Installed power: 11,000 ihp
- Propulsion: triple-expansion steam engine; single screw
- Speed: service: 15 kn (28 km/h; 17 mph). Max: 18 kn (33 km/h; 21 mph)
- Capacity: Passengers: 301 1st class, 208 2nd class; Cargo: 171,303 cubic feet (4,851 m^{3})
- Crew: 283 (116 Europeans and 167 Lascars)
- Notes: Sister ships: Arabia, China, India, Persia

SS Egypt was a P&O ocean liner. She sank after a collision with Seine on 20 May 1922 in the Celtic Sea. 252 people were rescued from the 338 passengers and crew aboard at the time. A subsequent salvage operation recovered most of the cargo of gold and silver.

== Early career ==
Caird & Company built Egypt at Greenock on the River Clyde, launching her on 15 May 1897. She generally ran between the United Kingdom and India, but served as a hospital ship in the First World War.

== Final voyage ==
Egypt left Tilbury, Essex, on 19 May 1922 carrying only 44 passengers and a cargo that included gold and silver bullion and gold sovereigns worth over £1 million (around £200 million at the 2012 gold price).

The voyage proceeded normally until the early morning of 20 May, when fog was encountered. As a safety measure Captain Collyer greatly reduced the speed of the ship. Egypt remained in fog until the afternoon, when the navigator was able to sight landmarks on the French coast and fix the ship's position.

After continuing the voyage for several hours a dense fog bank was suddenly encountered at around 7p.m. The engines were stopped, but almost immediately afterwards a fog whistle was heard. The steamship Seine emerged through the fog and within seconds struck Egypt's port side in the Celtic Sea 28 nautical miles (52 km) off the Ar Men Lighthouse, Finistère, France. Seine had a strengthened bow for ice-breaking, which penetrated deeply into Egypt's hull before the ships drifted apart.

An SOS distress signal was transmitted and replies were received from the steamers Cahiracon and RMS Andes, but Egypt sank in less than 20 minutes, before either ship arrived. Most of the passengers and crew were able to abandon ship in the lifeboats, which were picked up by Seine, but 86 of the 352 people on board Egypt died.

== Salvage ==
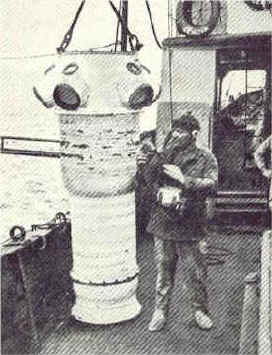
The torretta Butoscopica

Because Egypt had such valuable cargo, it was not long before salvage attempts began. However, Egypt's wreck was not found until 1930. She was found lying upright in a depth of 128 metres (420 ft), 70 fathoms, making recovery very difficult with the technology of the time. Giovanni Quaglia from the Genoese company Società Ricuperi Marittimi (So.Ri.Ma.) was in charge of the operation and decided to use his salvage fleet with the main ship Artiglio, on which there was embarked a famous group of expert hard hat divers under the command of the chief diver Alberto Gianni, who had invented special diving equipment.

Gianni located the wreck, and sent a diver in his specially-built Torretta Butoscopica observation bell to direct salvage operations and the placing of explosives to blast through the ship to expose the strongroom. The diver then directed a grab which picked up the gold and silver. The salvage operation continued until 1935, by which time 98% of the contents of the strong room had been recovered. The recovery was reported in detail by The Times reporter David Scott, who sent daily cables to the newspaper, and who later published two famous books on this adventure, the first very deep recovery by divers, Seventy Fathom deep, with the divers of salvage ship Artiglio and The Egypt's gold.

== 2001 expedition ==
In June 2001 a team of British technical divers known as the Starfish Enterprise left Plymouth, England aboard the 24m-long Royal Navy fleet tender Loyal Watcher in search of the wreck. The research position gave the wreck to be 150 nautical miles across the English Channel and into the Bay of Biscay. They discovered and positively identified the wreck. which lay 25 miles off the French island of Ushant.

The divers conducted their exploration mainly on the upright bow of the wreck, but noted that the remaining sections, although upright, had considerably broken down to seabed level. Each of the divers recorded a maximum depth of 127 meters (420 ft). Deep-wreck photographer Leigh Bishop photographed sections of the hull, a spare propeller on the well deck, porcelain marked "P&O", and numerous portholes with drip trays and square fastening dogs, a trademark of P&O liners.

== Sources ==
- Bishop, Leigh (2002). "Seventy Fathoms Deep" (PDF). Advanced Diver Magazine. No. 14. pp. 35–39.
- Marriott, John (1987). Disaster At Sea. Shepperton: Ian Allan Publishing. ISBN 0711017379.
- Pickford, Nigel (1998). Lost Treasure Ships of the 20th Century. Washington, DC: National Geographic Society. p. 152. ISBN 0792274725.
