= HMS Albacore (1909) =

Destroyer of the Royal Navy

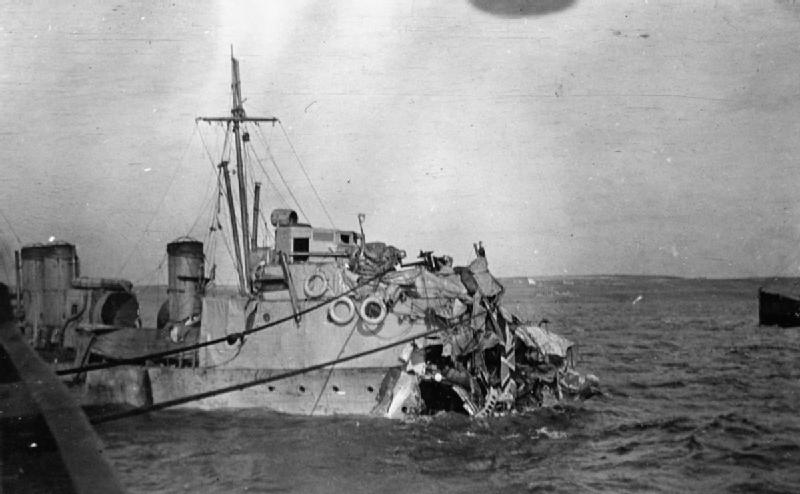
- Albacore after hitting a mine in 1917

History

United Kingdom
- Name: Albacore
- Ordered: 8 May 1908
- Builder: Palmers Shipbuilding and Iron Company, Jarrow
- Laid down: 1 September 1905
- Launched: 9 October 1906
- Commissioned: 27 March 1909
- Fate: Sold for scrap 1 August 1919

General characteristics
- Displacement: 408 long tons (415 t) normal; 44 long tons (45 t) deep load
- Length: 220 ft 10 in (67.31 m) oa; 215 ft 3 in (65.61 m) pp
- Beam: 21 ft 0 1/4 in (6.41 m)
- Draught: 6 ft 5 1/2 in (1.97 m)
- Installed power: 6,000 shp (4,500 kW)
- Propulsion: 4 × Reed water tube boilers; Parsons steam turbines driving 2 shafts
- Speed: 26.75 kn (49.54 km/h; 30.78 mph)
- Complement: 56 officers and men
- Armament: 3 × QF 12-pounder 12 cwt guns; 2 × single tubes for 18-inch (450mm) torpedoes

HMS Albacore was a "thirty-knotter" destroyer of the British Royal Navy, which was later classified as part of the B class. She was built by Palmer's of Yarrow as a private venture, launching in 1906, and being purchased in 1909. She served through the First World War before being sold for scrap in 1919.

== Construction and design ==
The shipbuilder Palmers Shipbuilding and Iron Company laid down two destroyers on speculation (i.e. without a specific order) on 1 September 1905, as Yard Numbers 786 and 787. (Note: It is unknown whether Palmer's had any specific customer in mind for these two ships.) The two destroyers were of generally similar size and design to the Royal Navy's earlier "thirty knotter" destroyers (later redesignated as the B, C or D class depending on the number of funnels), with a turtleback forecastle, with the Royal Navy having abandoned the "thirty-knotter" type for the River-class destroyers, with a higher raised forecastle instead of a turtleback, and sacrificing high speed in sea trials in favour of greater seaworthiness. The first of the two ships, which would later become HMS Albacore, was launched on 9 October 1906. Palmer's was unable to find a customer for these ships, however, and offered to sell them to the Royal Navy on 5 December 1907 for £70,000–80,000 each. The Admiralty rejected the offer in February 1908, but in April two destroyers, Tiger and Gala, were lost in accidents and it was decided to order the two stock ships from Palmer's as replacements. A provisional order for the two ships was placed on 8 May 1908, at a price of £60,000 each, depending on successful trials, with a speed of 31 knots (57 km/h; 36 mph) being required.

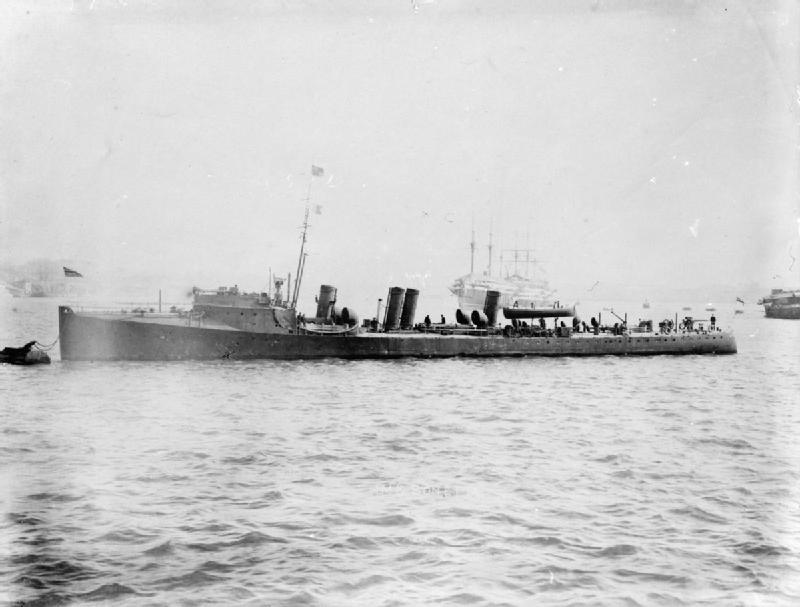
Albacore's sister ship HMS Bonetta

Unlike most "thirty-knotter"s, the new ships were powered by steam turbines rather than triple expansion engines, with four Reed boilers feeding steam at 250 pounds per square inch (1,700 kPa) to Parsons direct drive turbines which drove two shafts, generating 6,000 shaft horsepower (4,500 kW). (Note: Sources differ as to the fuel used to power the ships, with some stating that they were oil-fuelled, while others say that they used coal.) The ships had four funnels, with the middle two funnels closely spaced.

Albacore's hull was 220 feet 10 inches (67.31 m) long overall and 215 feet 3 inches (65.61 m) between perpendiculars, with a beam of 21 feet 0 1/4 inch (6.41 m) and a draught of 6 feet 5 1/2 inches (1.97 m). She displaced 408 long tons (415 t) normal load and 440 long tons (450 t) deep load. The ship's stem was higher than earlier turtleback destroyers, while rather than the narrow conning tower of the earlier destroyers, Albacore had a full-width bridge situated further aft, which was claimed by Palmer's to make the ship much drier in heavy seas. Gun armament consisted of three QF 12 pounder 12 cwt naval guns, with two situated side by side on top of the bridge and one aft. Two 18 inch (450 mm) torpedo tubes were carried, while the ship had a complement of 56 officers and men.

== Service ==
Although it was hoped that the ship could be accepted quickly, with delivery expected within two to three months of the order being placed, official sea trials proved problematical. Albacore only reached a maximum of 26.75 knots (49.54 km/h; 30.78 mph) instead of the required 31 knots, which may have been due to more realistic trial conditions. The Admiralty finally agreed to accept Albacore and her sister ship Bonetta on 3 March 1909, paying £45,000 for each. HMS Albacore was commissioned on 27 March that year.

Albacore was part of the Fourth Destroyer Flotilla in 1910, and of the Sixth Flotilla in 1913. On 30 August 1912 the Admiralty directed all destroyers were to be grouped into classes designated by letters based on appearance. As a four-funneled ship, Albacore was listed as a B-class destroyer on 1 October 1913. On 6 April 1914 a boiler tube burst in Chatham harbour, killing three men.

On the outbreak of the First World War in August 1914, Albacore was sent to Scapa Flow to join the local patrol flotilla protecting the anchorage of the Grand Fleet. Albacore was heavily damaged on 9 March 1917 when she struck a mine laid by the German submarine UC-55 off Kirkwall, her bow being blown off and 17 of her crew being killed, but was later repaired, being back in service by July 1917. Albacore was sold for scrap on 1 August 1919.

== Pennant numbers ==
Pennant number	Date
P14	1914
D76	August 1915
D01	January 1918

== Bibliography ==
- Chesneau, Roger & Kolesnik, Eugene M., eds. (1979). Conway's All The World's Fighting Ships 1860–1905. London: Conway Maritime Press. ISBN 0-85177-133-5.
- Colledge, J. J.; Warlow, Ben (2006) [1969]. Ships of the Royal Navy: The Complete Record of All Fighting Ships of the Royal Navy from the 15th Century to the Present (3rd Rev ed.). London: Chatham Publishing. ISBN 978-1-86176-281-8. OCLC 67375475.
- Dittmar, F.J.; Colledge, J.J. (1972). British Warships 1914–1919. Shepperton, UK: Ian Allan. ISBN 0-7110-0380-7.
- Friedman, Norman (2009). British Destroyers: From Earliest Days to the Second World War. Barnsley, UK: Seaforth Publishing. ISBN 978-1-84832-049-9.
- Gardiner, Robert & Gray, Randal, eds. (1985). Conway's All The World's Fighting Ships 1906–1921. London: Conway Maritime Press. ISBN 0-85177-245-5.
- Lyon, David (2001) [1996]. The First Destroyers. London: Caxton Editions. ISBN 1-84067-3648.
- Manning, T. D. (1961). The British Destroyer. London: Putnam & Co. OCLC 6470051.
- March, Edgar J. (1966). British Destroyers: A History of Development, 1892–1953; Drawn by Admiralty Permission From Official Records & Returns, Ships' Covers & Building Plans. London: Seeley Service. OCLC 164893555.
