= HMS Vixen (1900) =

Destroyer of the Royal Navy

History

United Kingdom
- Name: Vixen
- Ordered: 1898 – 1898 Naval Estimates
- Builder: Vickers, Sons and Maxim, Barrow-in-Furness
- Laid down: 7 September 1899
- Launched: 29 March 1900
- Commissioned: March 1902
- Decommissioned: 1919
- Out of service: Laid up in reserve 1919
- Fate: 17 March 1921 sold to Thos W Ward for breaking at Grays, Essex, on the Thames Estuary

General characteristics
- Class & type: Vickers three funnel - 30 knot destroyer
- Displacement: 355 long tons (361 t) standard; 400 long tons (406 t) full load; 214 ft 3 in (65.30 m) o/a; 20 ft (6.1 m) Beam; 8 ft 5 in (2.57 m) Draught
- Propulsion: 4 × Thornycroft water tube boiler; 2 × Vertical Triple Expansion (VTE) steam engines driving 2 shafts producing 6,300 shp (4,700 kW)
- Speed: 30 kn (56 km/h)
- Range: 70 tons coal; 1,440 nmi (2,670 km) at 11 kn (20 km/h)
- Complement: 63 officers and men
- Armament: 1 × QF 12-pounder 12 cwt Mark I L/40 naval gun on a P Mark I Low angle mount; 5 × QF 6-pdr 8 cwt naval gun L/40 Naval gun on a Mark I* low angle mount; 2 × single tubes for 18-inch (450mm) torpedoes

HMS Vixen was a Vickers three funnel - 30 knot destroyer ordered by the Royal Navy under the 1895 – 1896 Naval Estimates. She was the fourth ship to carry this name since it was introduced in 1801 for an 18-gun brig sold 1815.

== Construction and career ==
She was laid down on 7 September 1899 at Vickers, Sons and Maxim Naval Construction and Armaments shipyard at Barrow-in-Furness and launched on 29 March 1900. During her builder's trials she made her contract speed of 30 knots. She was completed and accepted by the Royal Navy in March 1902.

Vixen was assigned to the Channel Fleet. She was commissioned at Devonport by Commander William George Elmhirst Ruck-Keene on 11 March 1902, for service with the Devonport instructional flotilla. Commander Ruck-Keene and the crew transferred to HMS Gipsy on 30 July 1902, when the latter ship replaced her in the Flotilla. She spent her operational career mainly in Home Waters operating with the Channel Fleet in the East Coast Flotilla.

In the evening of 16 August 1912 she was in collision with the ferry South Shields while proceeding down river.

On 30 August 1912 the Admiralty directed all destroyer classes were to be designated by alpha characters starting with the letter 'A'. Since her design speed was 30-knots and she had three funnels she was assigned to the C Class. After 30 September 1913, she was known as a C Class destroyer and had the letter ‘C’ painted on the hull below the bridge area and on either the fore or aft funnel.

=== World War I ===
For the test mobilization in July 1914 she was assigned to the 7th Destroyer Flotilla based at Devonport tendered to HMS Leander, destroyer depot ship to the 7th Flotilla. In September 1914 the 7th was redeployed to the Humber River. Her employment within the Humber Patrol included anti-submarine and counter mining patrols.

In November 1916 she was redeployed to the Nore Local Flotilla performing anti-submarine patrols and counter mining operations off the Thames until the Armistice.

In 1919 she was paid off and laid-up in reserve awaiting disposal. She was sold on 17 March 1921 to Thos. W. Ward for breaking at Grays, Essex, on the Thames Estuary.

== Pennant Numbers ==
Pennant Number	From	To
D44	6 Dec 1914	1 Sep 1915
D74	1 Sep 1915	1 Jan 1918
D95	1 Jan 1918	17 Mar 1921

== Bibliography ==
- Chesneau, Roger & Kolesnik, Eugene M., eds. (1979). Conway's All The World's Fighting Ships 1860–1905. London: Conway Maritime Press. ISBN 0-85177-133-5.
- Colledge, J. J.; Warlow, Ben (2006) [1969]. Ships of the Royal Navy: The Complete Record of All Fighting Ships of the Royal Navy from the 15th Century to the Present (3rd Rev ed.). London: Chatham Publishing. ISBN 978-1-86176-281-8. OCLC 67375475.
- Dittmar, F. J. & Colledge, J. J. (1972). British Warships 1914–1919. Shepperton, UK: Ian Allan. ISBN 0-7110-0380-7.
- Friedman, Norman (2009). British Destroyers: From Earliest Days to the Second World War. Barnsley, UK: Seaforth Publishing. ISBN 978-1-84832-049-9.
- Gardiner, Robert & Gray, Randal, eds. (1985). Conway's All The World's Fighting Ships 1906–1921. London: Conway Maritime Press. ISBN 0-85177-245-5.
- Lyon, David (2001) [1996]. The First Destroyers. London: Caxton Editions. ISBN 1-84067-3648.
- Manning, T. D. (1961). The British Destroyer. London: Putnam & Co. OCLC 6470051.
- March, Edgar J. (1966). British Destroyers: A History of Development, 1892–1953; Drawn by Admiralty Permission From Official Records & Returns, Ships' Covers & Building Plans. London: Seeley Service. OCLC 164893555.
