= SS India (1896) =

1896 steam passenger liner

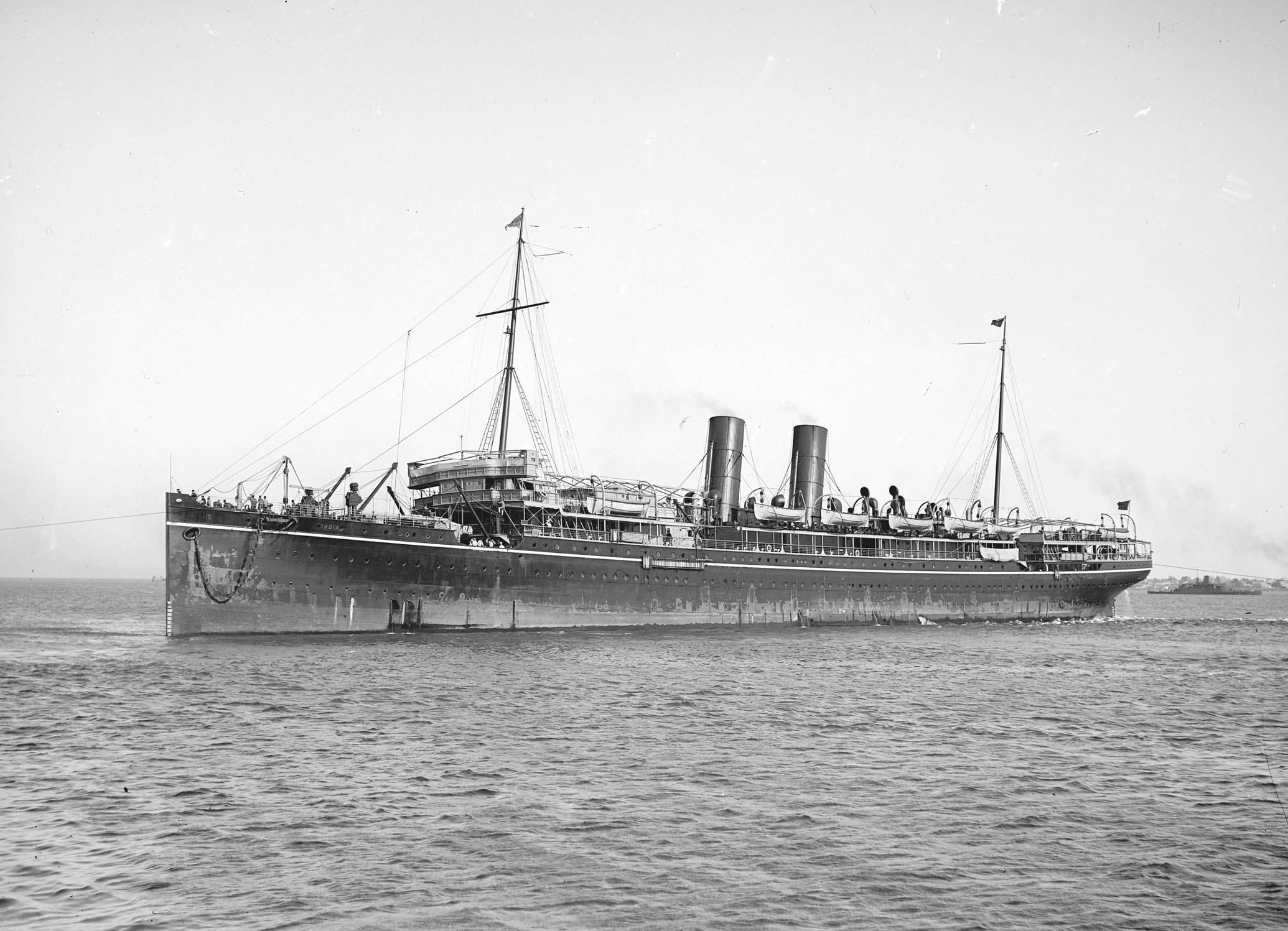
- India 1906

History
- Name: India
- Owner: Peninsular and Oriental Steam Navigation Company
- Builder: Caird & Co, Greenock
- Yard number: 281
- Launched: 15 April 1896
- Completed: 3 September 1896
- Home port: Greenock
- Fate: Sunk on 8 August 1915

General characteristics
- Type: Ocean liner
- Tonnage: 7,911 GRT
- Length: 499 ft 11 in (152.37 m)
- Beam: 54 ft 4 in (16.56 m)
- Draught: 26 ft 9 in (8.15 m)
- Propulsion: 1 × propeller shaft; 1 × three-cylinder triple-expansion steam engine; 11000ihp
- Speed: 18 knots (33 km/h)
- Capacity: Either 317 First Class and 152 Second Class passengers; Or 2500 troops

SS India was a steam passenger liner operated by the Peninsular and Oriental Steam Navigation Company (P&O) between 1896 and 1915. India was the first of five sister ships built for P&O, the others being the Persia, China, Egypt and Arabia. India was the largest ship built for P&O at the time.

Built by Caird & Company of Greenock, Scotland, she was launched on 15 April 1896 and entered service later that year, operating on P&O's route between Britain, India and Australia. In 1900 she became the first ship to use P&O's new harbour facilities at Fremantle. She initially remained in service with P&O after the outbreak of the First World War, and carried Admiral Doveton Sturdee from Gibraltar back to England after the Battle of the Falkland Islands.

She was hired by the Admiralty on 13 March 1915 and was used as an armed merchant cruiser, serving in the 10th Cruiser Squadron. On 8 August that year she stopped off Helligvær, near Bodø, Norway, to investigate a suspected blockade runner, and was torpedoed by the German submarine U-22. India's sinking caused the deaths of 160 of the crew. The surviving 22 officers and 119 men were taken to Narvik.

HMS India common grave and memorial in Bodø, Norway
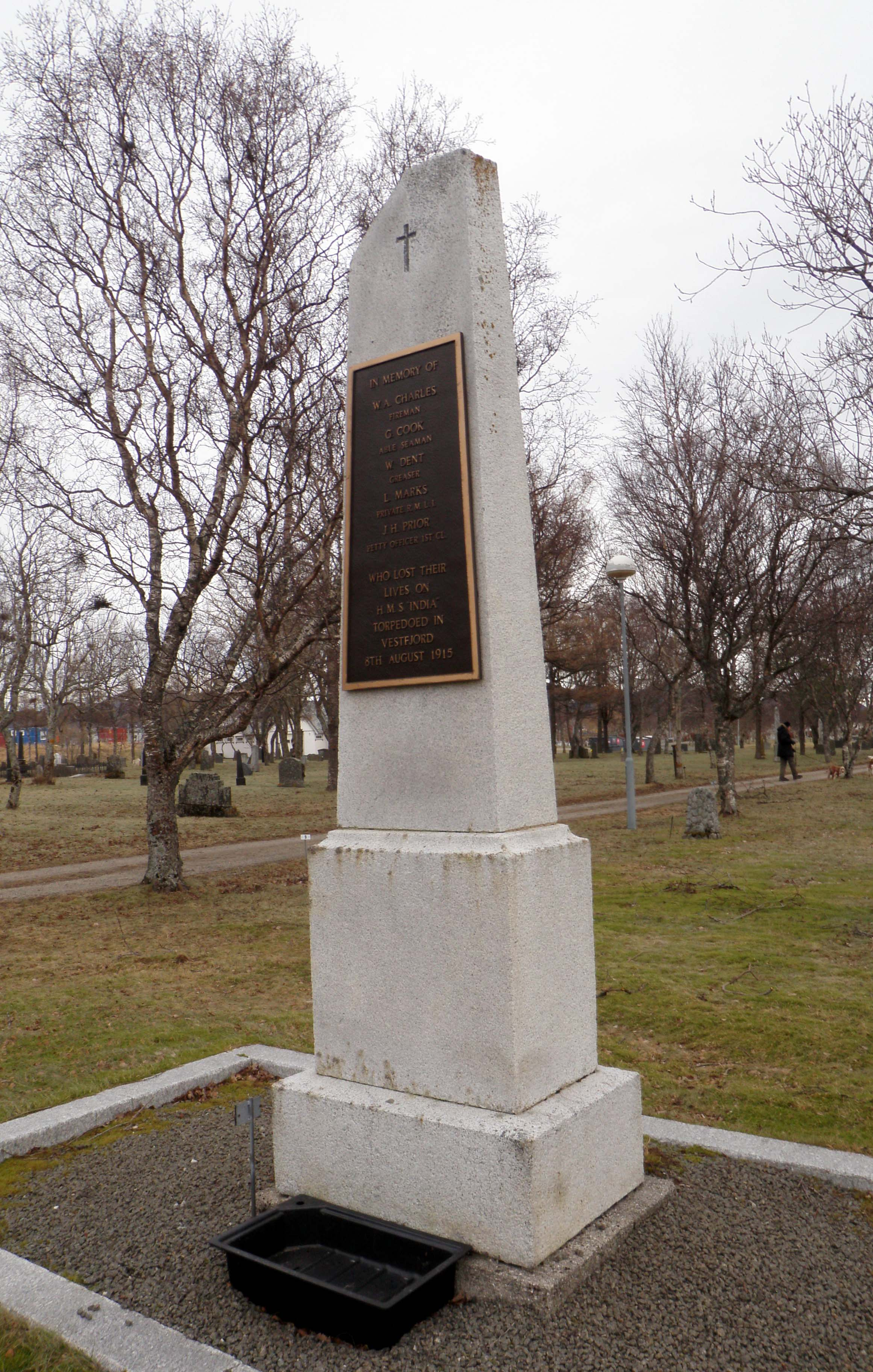
Memorial and common grave for five crew members of HMS India, English language side

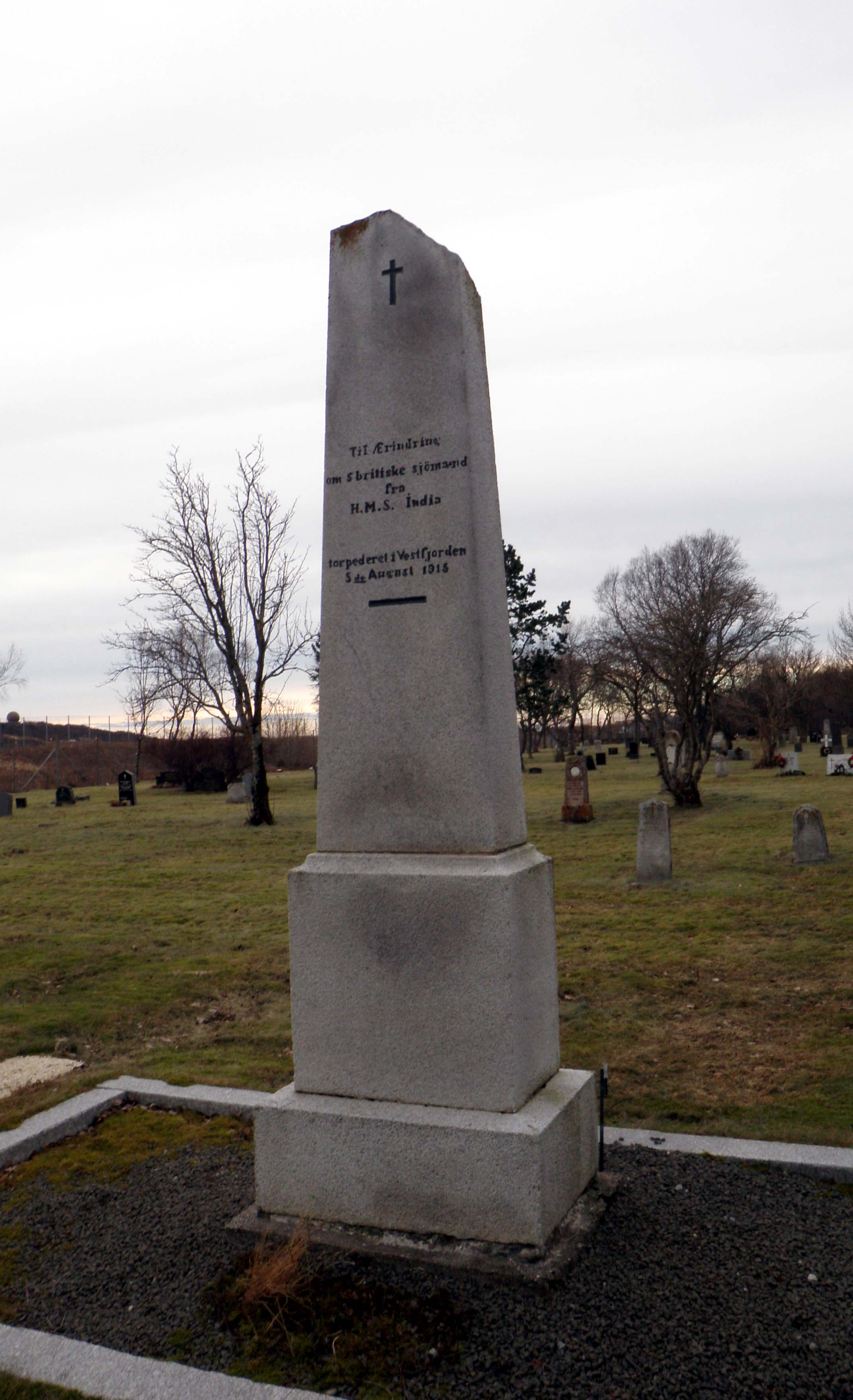
Memorial and common grave for five crew members of HMS India, Norwegian language side
HMS India common grave and memorial
