= Violet-class destroyer =

Class overview
- Builders: William Doxford & Sons, Sunderland
- Operators: Royal Navy
- Built: 1896–1899
- In commission: 1898–1920
- Completed: 2
- Scrapped: 2

General characteristics
- Class & type: Violet-class destroyer
- Displacement: 350 long tons (356 t)
- Length: 214 ft 9 in (65.46 m)
- Beam: 21 ft (6.4 m)
- Draught: 9 ft 7 in (2.9 m)
- Propulsion: Vertical triple-expansion steam engines; Coal-fired Normand boilers; 6,300 hp (4,698 kW)
- Speed: 30 knots (56 km/h; 35 mph)
- Complement: 63
- Armament: 1 × QF 12-pounder gun; 3 × 6-pounder guns; 3 × 18 inch (450 mm) torpedo tubes

The Violet class destroyer was a class of two destroyers that served in the British Royal Navy.

Violet and Sylvia were built by William Doxford & Sons in Sunderland. They were fitted with Thornycroft boilers which generated 6,300 HP and produced the 30 knots (56 km/h) demanded of these three funnelled C-class destroyers. They were armed with the standard 12-pounder gun and two torpedo tubes, and carried a complement of 63 officers and men.

Both ships served through the Great War and were broken up shortly afterwards.
