= Artiglio =

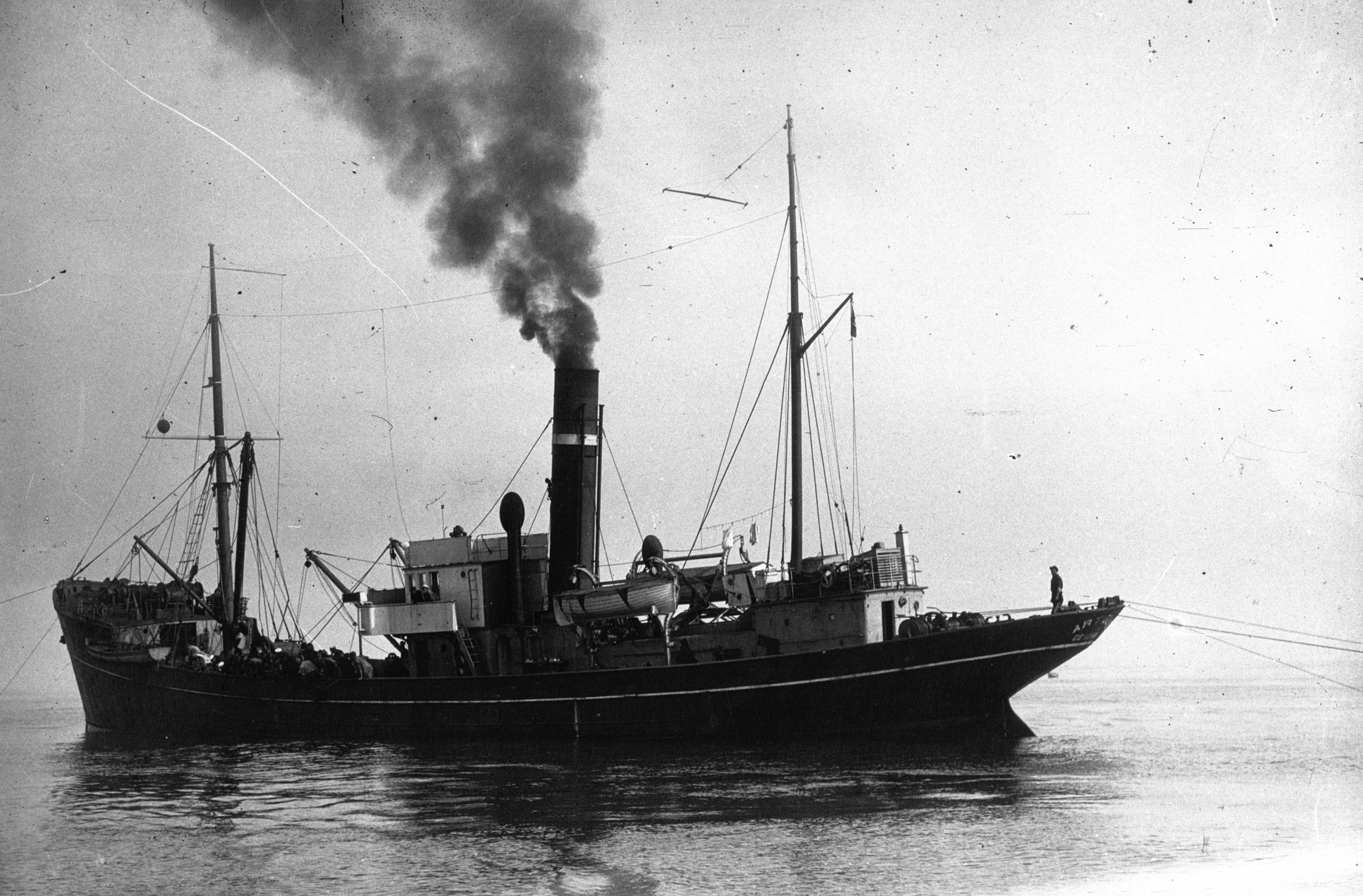
- Artiglio II in 1932.

History
- Name: Macbeth, Ideale, Artiglio
- Owner: Giovanni Quaglia
- Operator: SO.RI.MA. (Society for Maritime Recovery)
- Builder: Mackie & Thomson, Govan
- Yard number: 324
- Launched: 07. February 1906
- Out of service: 1930
- Fate: Sunk in an explosion in 1930

General characteristics
- Type: Steamship (salvage ship)
- Tonnage: 283.73 tons
- Length: 46.85 metres (153.7 ft)
- Beam: 7.01 metres (23.0 ft)

The Artiglio ("Talon") was a steamship used as a salvage ship by the shipping company SO.RI.MA. (Society for Maritime Recovery) of Genoa, founded in 1926 by Commendatore Giovanni Quaglia. At the time of her loss in 1930, Artiglio was the world's most modern salvage ship.

== History ==
The Artiglio was built as a fishing boat in Glasgow in 1906. It was initially named the Macbeth and later called the Ideale. It was the flagship of a small fleet which included the Rostro, Raffio and Arpione, outfitted in the twenties and used for the recovery of sunken ships mainly during the First World War and after the Second World War, and crewed by a group of experienced divers. The fleet was equipped with innovative equipment that was futuristic at the time, thanks to the dynamism of its owner who bought the first modern and functional atmospheric diving suit, and the inventiveness of Alberto Gianni, known for inventing the portable on-board decompression chamber and the "torretta butoscopica", an exploration turret used for recoveries at great depth, then still too risky for divers using classic equipment. The "Artiglio" had telephones that allowed divers to communicate with people on the surface.

The Artiglio in particular received much attention in international news when it was sent, on behalf of Lloyd's of London, to the Atlantic Ocean off the coast of Brest, France, in search of the ocean liner SS Egypt, flying the British flag, carrying a valuable cargo consisting of coins and gold bullion for the banks of India, then still a British colony. Following various sensational failures by other major English and Dutch recovery companies, the research and recovery contract was offered to SO.RI.MA. of Genoa. Head diver Alberto Gianni was in command of operations. The wreck of Egypt was identified on 29 August 1930 at a depth of -130m but the bad winter weather forced postponement of the recovery to the following spring. In the meantime, the Artiglio was sent to the island of Belle Île, in the northwest of France, to recover the Florence H, which sank in 1917, carrying a large quantity of explosives, on the harbor front obstructing the passage.

During the demolition of Florence H., it was erroneously assumed that the explosive, submerged for more than 13 years, was not reactive. On 8 December 1930, as a result of a demolition charge, the payload inside the ship also exploded. The Artiglio, positioned by a fatal error of assessment at an insufficient distance, was destroyed by the explosion and sank in the Bay of Biscay between Belle Île and Houat, Morbihan, France. Twelve of the ship's nineteen crew members died in the accident, including divers Alberto Gianni, Aristide Franceschi, and Alberto Bargellini, all from Viareggio, and the ship's commander, Captain Bertolotto di Camogli. The survivors were rescued by the Rostro.

== Artiglio II ==
To retrieve the treasure of the Egypt, Commendatore Quaglia quickly outfitted a second ship, originally given the name Maurétanie, and renaming it Artiglio II; it was, however, soon generally called "Artiglio". With this ship, refitted and restored by the crew of SO.RI.MA., mostly equipped with recovered material from the Artiglio, thanks to inventions and organization left by Alberto Gianni, and in the face of enormous sacrifices on the part of the crew in stormy waters off the coast of Brest, all the treasure of the Egypt was finally recovered, largely made up of coins, bars and gold bullion as well as several bars of silver. The recovery occurred at a depth deemed impossible to reach at the time by divers, who used the famous "torretta butoscopica" invented by Gianni, dropped to -130 meters, to direct the work of buckets operated aboard the Artiglio. This event brought great prestige to Italy, the achievement being acclaimed worldwide by heads of state and government of the time. Congratulations were sent from all over the world, including from George V (King of the United Kingdom), Benito Mussolini, and then-communications minister Costanzo Ciano.

== Giovanni Quaglia ==
Commendatore Giovanni Quaglia, a man of great business ability and foresight, was the forerunner of all modern high depth naval activities and recovery diving operations. Thanks to him, all the oil companies and the naval forces of the world are also equipped with vehicles and equipment following the operating philosophy of the Artiglio and SO.RI.MA. which he founded and directed, a company with which he completed numerous salvage and maritime operations, and which thanks to its continued success was considered the best and most competitive at a global level. He was also the first Italian owner to set up a fleet of oil tankers. Unfortunately, he was also regarded as a person of few scruples and did not respect commitments with divers and crews that had earned both prestige and money, not bestowing awards and promised adequate compensation. With the complicity of the Fascist regime he managed to evade union demands by the maritime confederation.

Shortly after, she was engaged in the unsuccessful salvation attempts of the French submarine Prométhée, sunk on July 7, 1932 off Cherbourg.

== David Scott ==
Aboard the Artiglio lived the journalist and writer David Scott, special correspondent for The Times of London, who promptly dispatched articles by radio. On the day of the sinking he was on land, but he was present during the campaign to recover the treasure of the Egypt, all the steps of which he described in detail. He was very close to the crew and later wrote several books on the events related to the company SO.RI.MA. that had considerable international success, thus helping to create the myth of the Italian divers. The books he wrote are an important reference point for enthusiasts and historians, because they are so numerous and provide detailed information about the historical events related to the world of Italian divers at that time.

== Viareggio ==
In memory of the ship and the divers from the city of Viareggio, the Artiglio Europe Foundation was established in Viareggio. It bestows the International Artiglio Award on those who have distinguished themselves in the world of diving and the study and protection of the marine environment. There is also a secondary school in Viareggio, the Istituto Tecnico Nautico Artiglio (Nautical State School "Artiglio"), which prepares students for careers in the Merchant Navy and as shipbuilders. Since 1966, the city has operated the "club subacqueo Artiglio" ("Artiglio diving club"). The local maritime museum has a large section devoted to the actions of Viareggio divers and diving equipment made available by the club members.

== Bibliography ==
- Tegani, Ulderico (1931). Viaggi nel mondo sommerso [Travel in the underwater world] (in Italian). Milan: Mondadori.
- Scott, David (1931). Seventy Fathoms Deep. London: Faber & Faber Ltd.
- Scott, David (1931). Con i palombari dell'Artiglio [With the divers of the Artiglio] (in Italian). Treves Treccani Tuminelli.
- Scott, David (1932). The Egypt Gold. London: Faber & Faber Ltd.
- Scott, David (1932). L'Artiglio e l'oro dell'Egypt [The Artiglio and the gold of the Egypt] (in Italian). Milan: Mondadori.
- Scott, David (1939). The Egypt's Gold. London: Penguin.
- Micheli, Silvio (1997). L'Artiglio ha confessato (in Italian). Mauro Baroni. ISBN 88-8209-040-X.
- Poddi, Stefano (October 2010). L'avventura dell'Artiglio e le banconote di Hyderabad (in Italian). Cronanca Numismatica n. 233.

== See also ==
- Shipwreck
- Underwater diving
