= Alberto Gianni =

Italian underwater diver and inventor

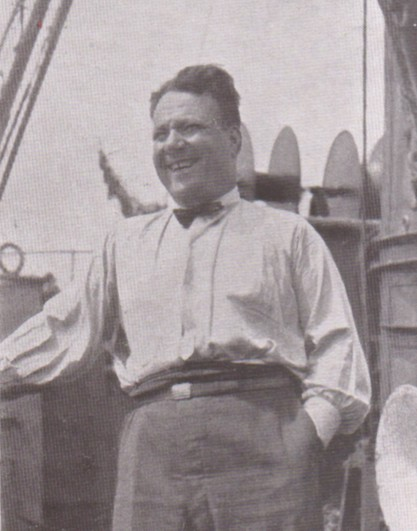
- Alberto Gianni aboard the Artiglio
- Born: 26 April 1891; Viareggio, Tuscany, Italy
- Died: 7 December 1930 (aged 39); Belle Île, Brittany, France
- Known for: Underwater diver, inventor

Alberto Gianni (26 April 1891 – 7 December 1930) was an Italian underwater diver and inventor.

== Early life and career ==
Gianni was born in Viareggio, Tuscany, Italy. He served as a soldier during the Italo-Turkish War and World War I, becoming a diver after seeing divers on warships. In 1911 he plugged a leak on the Italian battleship Regina Elena after it had collided with the Saint-Bon in stormy seas. In 1916 he suffered from decompression sickness after participating in a submarine recovery in La Spezia.

== Diving equipment ==
Gianni is best known for building a decompression chamber, which he called the cassa disazotatrice, in 1916.

Another of his major achievements was the "torretta butoscopica", (direct translation: exploration turret), a one-man atmospheric pressure underwater observation chamber deployed by a lifting cable from a ship, provided with a telephone, and supplied with breathing air from the surface, which he designed, built and tested.

== Recovery operations ==
Gianni gained international fame for his work as a diver. He worked on the case of the Spanish steamship Cruz, sunk on Scoglio del Catalano (Catalan Cliff) on the west coast of Sardinia. Because the shipwreck seemed suspicious, British insurers sought divers able to check it, but none accepted the job due to its technical difficulty. Gianni accepted on condition that he would receive twice the compensation offered because of the difficulty of the job. The request was accepted and Gianni accomplished his task, finding the intentional nature of the shipwreck. He then appeared in court in London to confirm the findings, earning recognition for himself and the superiority of Italian divers.

Another famous case was the recovery in Lake Como of the Lariana company's boat Lecco, sunk on the evening of 18 February 1927 in the port of Como.

Gianni's most widely known achievement was probably the discovery of the wreck of the SS Egypt, sunk in the Atlantic Ocean off the coast of Brest in Brittany, France, at a depth of about 120m and carrying a precious cargo of gold bullion and silver. Attempts to locate the ship and recover the treasure had been made by the most famous companies of the time. In the end Lloyd's of London commissioned the credible and organized SO.RI.MA. ("Society for Maritime Recovery") founded by Commendatore Giovanni Quaglia, who finally succeeded with the recovery ship Artiglio ("Talon"), on which Gianni worked as chief diver and underwater operations manager. His exploits were described by journalist David Scott, who followed all the events of recoveries on behalf of the SO.RI.MA. company for The Times of London, living aboard its ships and writing numerous articles and two books.

== Death ==
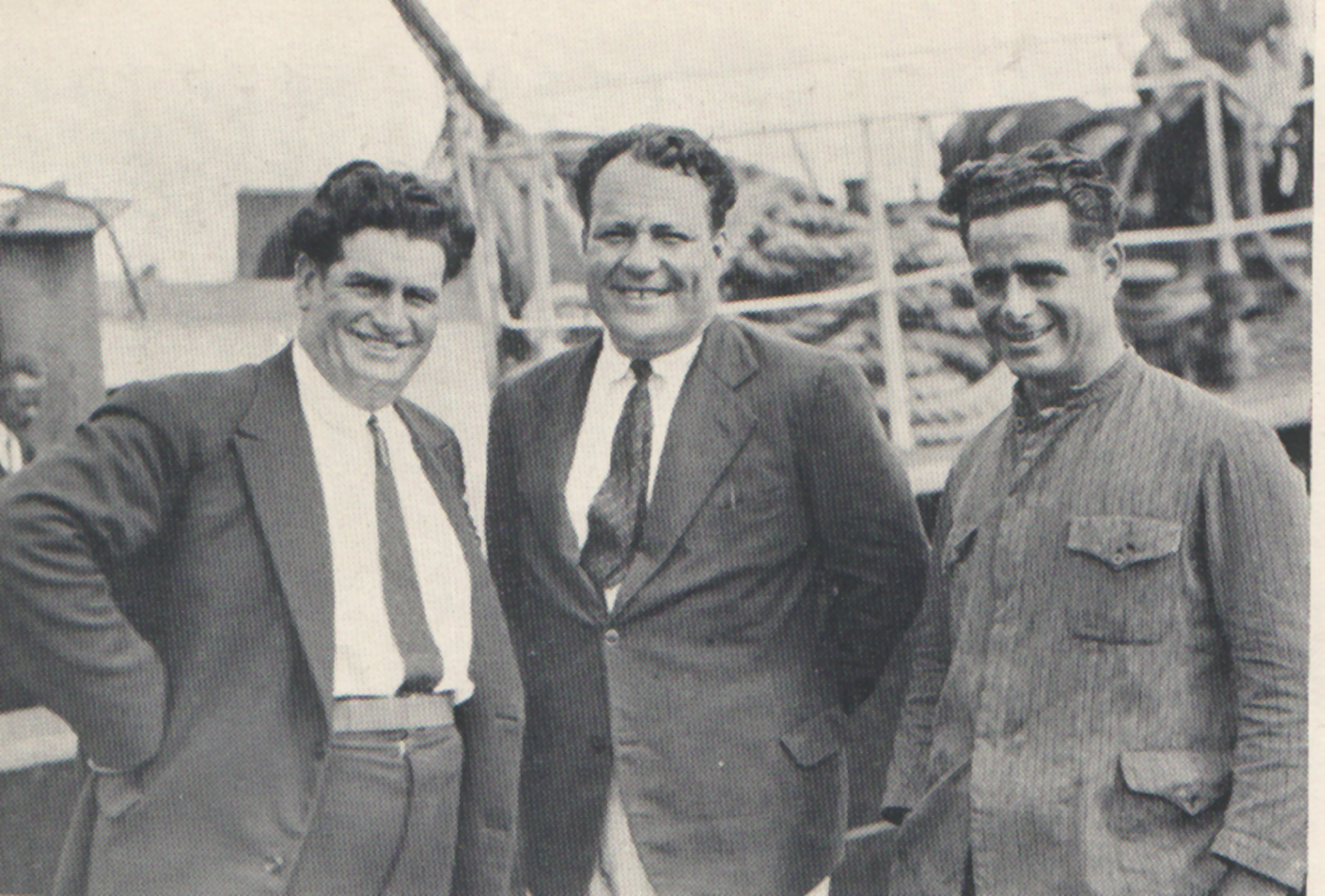
Aristide Franceschi, Alberto Gianni, Alberto Bargellini

After locating the SS Egypt, due to bad weather and the inability to carry out its recovery, while waiting for suitable weather conditions, the SO.RI.MA. company got the job to carry out some recovery operations near the island of Belle Île, south of Brest, sending the ship Artiglio with Gianni as head of operations. Gianni died on 7 December 1930 during the dismantling of the SS Florence H., sunk full of explosives and ammunition. The Artiglio was swept away, destroyed and sunk by the explosion. Two other famous divers, Alberto Bargellini and Aristide Franceschi, and nine other crew members perished with Gianni. The tragedy occurred at a time of great euphoria given the real possibility of recovering the valuable sunken treasure of the Egypt.

== The gold of the Egypt ==
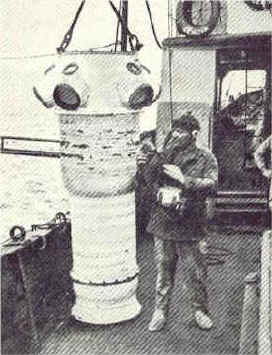
The "torretta butoscopica"

The recovery of the Egypt's treasure was then carried out by the SO.RI.MA. company, outfitting a new ship, called the Nuovo Artiglio, for the occasion. The operation achieved a resounding success at the international level since it was the first step in the world of deep-water recovery, something considered impossible at the time, carried out by Italian divers and which became possible thanks to the organization left by Gianni and the use of his inventions, especially the "torretta butoscopica". Congratulations were sent from all over the world, including from George V (King of the United Kingdom), Benito Mussolini, and then-communications minister Costanzo Ciano.

== See also ==
- Decompression chamber
- Underwater diving

== Bibliography ==
- Viaggi nel mondo sommerso (Travel in the underwater world) – Ulderico Tegani – Mondadori Milan 1931 – (ISBN not available)
- Seventy fathoms deep – David Scott – Faber & Faber Limited London 1931 – (ISBN not available)
- Ed. it. "Con i palombari dell'Artiglio" (With the divers of the Artiglio) – Treves Treccani Tuminelli – (ISBN not available)
- The Egypt gold – David Scott – Faber & Faber London 1932 – (ISBN not available)
- Ed. it. "L'Artiglio e l'oro dell'Egypt" (The Artiglio and the gold of the Egypt) – Mondadori – (ISBN not available)
- L'Artiglio ha confessato (The Artiglio has confessed) – Fabio Micheli – ISBN 88-8209-040-X – ed. Mauro Baroni 1997
- Alberto Gianni Capopalombaro dell'Artiglio (Alberto Gianni, Chief Diver of the Artiglio) – Boris Giannaccini – ISBN 9788896915219 – Ed. Ist. Ellenico Studi Bizantini 2011
