= HMS Bonetta (1907) =

Destroyer of the Royal Navy

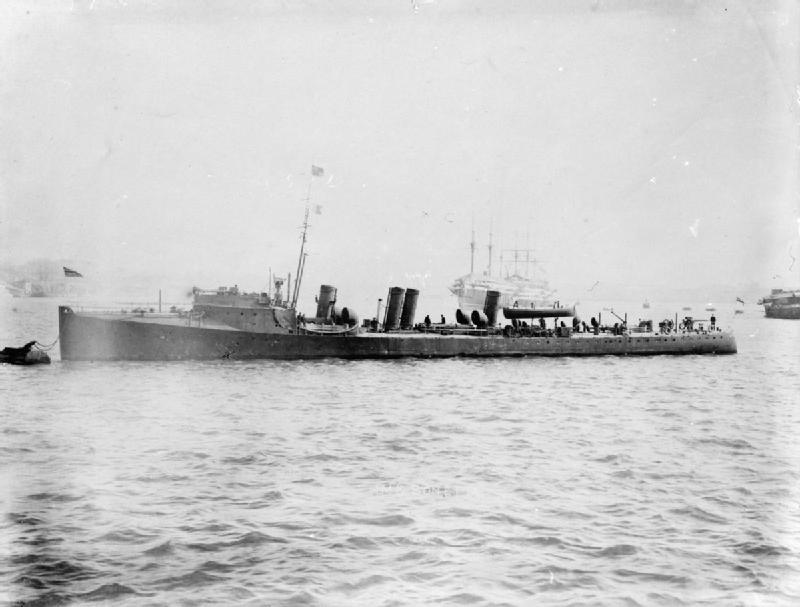

History

United Kingdom
- Name: HMS Bonetta
- Builder: Palmers Shipbuilding and Iron Company, Jarrow
- Laid down: 1 September 1905
- Launched: 14 January 1907
- Completed: 27 March 1909
- Acquired: 3 March 1909
- Fate: Sold for scrap June 1920

General characteristics
- Displacement: 408 long tons (415 t) normal; 44 long tons (45 t) deep load
- Length: 220 ft 10 in (67.31 m) oa; 215 ft 3 in (65.61 m) pp
- Beam: 21 ft 0 1/4 in (6.41 m)
- Draught: 6 ft 5 1/2 in (1.97 m)
- Installed power: 6,000 shp (4,500 kW)
- Propulsion: 4 × Reed water tube boilers; Parsons steam turbines driving 2 shafts
- Speed: 26.75 kn (49.54 km/h; 30.78 mph)
- Complement: 56 officers and men
- Armament: 3 × QF 12-pounder 12 cwt guns; 2 × single tubes for 18-inch (450mm) torpedoes

HMS Bonetta was a British torpedo boat destroyer which was later classified as part of the B class. The ship was built as a Private Venture, without a specific order, by the Jarrow shipbuilder Palmers and was launched in 1907. She was purchased for the British Royal Navy in 1909 and served through the First World War. Bonetta was sold for scrap in 1920.

== Construction and design ==
The shipbuilder Palmers Shipbuilding and Iron Company laid down two destroyers on speculation (i.e. without a specific order) on 1 September 1905, as Yard Number 786 and 787. (Note: It is unknown whether Palmer's had any specific customer in mind for these two ships.) The two destroyers were of generally similar size and design to the Royal Navy's earlier "thirty knotter" destroyers (later redesignated as the B, C or D class depending on the number of funnels), with a turtleback forecastle, with the Royal Navy having abandoned the "thirty-knotter" type for the River-class destroyers, with a higher raised forecastle instead of a turtleback, and sacrificing high speed in sea trials in favour of greater seaworthiness. The second destroyer, which would later become HMS Bonetta, was launched on 14 January 1907. Palmer's was unable to find a customer for these ships, however, and offered to sell them to the Royal Navy on 5 December 1907 for £70,000–80,000 each. The Admiralty rejected the offer in February 1908, but in April two destroyers, Tiger and Gala, were lost in accidents and it was decided to order the two stock ships from Palmer's as replacements. A provisional order for the two ships was placed on 8 May 1908, at a price of £60,000 each, depending on successful trials, with a speed of 31 knots (57 km/h; 36 mph) being required.

Unlike most "thirty-knotter"s, the new ships were powered by steam turbines rather than triple expansion engines, with four Reed boilers feeding steam at 250 pounds per square inch (1,700 kPa) to Parsons direct drive turbines which drove two shafts, generating 6,000 shaft horsepower (4,500 kW). (Note: Sources differ as to the fuel used to power the ships, with some stating that they were oil-fuelled, while others say that they used coal.) The ships had four funnels, with the middle two funnels closely spaced.

Bonetta was 220 feet 10 inches (67.31 m) long overall and 215 feet 3 inches (65.61 m) between perpendiculars, with a beam of 21 feet 0 1/4 inch (6.41 m) and a draught of 6 feet 5 1/2 inches (1.97 m). She displaced 408 long tons (415 t) normal load and 440 long tons (450 t) deep load. The ship's stem was higher than earlier turtleback destroyers, while rather than the narrow conning tower of the earlier destroyers, Albacore had a full-width bridge situated further aft, which was claimed by Palmer's to make the ship much drier in heavy seas. Gun armament consisted of three QF 12 pounder 12 cwt naval guns, with two situated side by side on top of the bridge and one aft. Two 18 inch (450 mm) torpedo tubes were carried, while the ship had a complement of 56 officers and men.

== Service ==
It was hoped that the two ships, which were both afloat and in good condition, could be accepted quickly, and delivery was expected within two to three months of the order being placed. Official sea trials demonstrated that the ships could not reach the required speed, with Bonetta' sister ship Albacore only reaching a maximum of 26.75 knots (49.54 km/h; 30.78 mph). This may have been due to more realistic trial conditions. The Admiralty finally agreed to accept Albacore and her sister ship Bonetta on 3 March 1909, paying £45,000 for each. HMS Bonetta was commissioned on 27 March that year. In June 1909, Bonetta, part of the Devonport Flotilla, was brought up to a full complement from a nucleus crew to take part in that year's naval manoeuvres. Bonetta, now part of the Fifth Destroyer Flotilla, was again mobilized in June 1910 for the manoeuvres.

Bonetta was part of the Fourth Destroyer Flotilla based at Portsmouth in 1911, and on 3 April 1911 the ferry Harlequin drifted onto Bonetta as Bonetta was passing through Spithead on the way back to Portsmouth. On 5 July 1911 the destroyer Osprey, another member of the Fourth Destroyer Flotilla, collided with Bonetta while leaving Berehaven harbour. While Osprey was unharmed, Bonetta's bows were damaged, requiring a return to Portsmouth. On 30 August 1912 the Admiralty directed all destroyers were to be grouped into classes designated by letters based on appearance. As a four-funneled ship, Bonetta was listed as a B-class destroyer on 1 October 1913.

In March 1913 Bonetta was listed as a member of the Sixth Destroyer Flotilla, a patrol flotilla based at Portsmouth. By February 1914 she was attached to the Lamlash Submarine Flotilla based at Devonport, and in March to the Ninth Submarine Flotilla, still based at Devonport. Bonetta remained as a tender to submarine flotillas throughout the First World War, both on the Clyde and the Tyne.

== Rescue operations ==
On 19 July 1918, she attended the rescue operations of SM UB-110, arriving late on the scene after an alleged massacre she picked up five survivors, including the captain, but one of them, the engineer officer died on deck immediately after being taken out of the water. The German captain, despite the ordeal he had come through, proved himself to be a very self-possessed individual when examined in the chart room. He expressed the opinion that Germany would shortly win the war, but he was a long way out in his calculation, as Germany was defeated six weeks later. Some of his sailors had not the same guts, but had got on their knees and begged for their lives on seeing officers of the `Bonetta' carrying arms. Webley & Scott automatic pistols hanging round their necks by lanyards were always put on when 'action' was sounded. The Bonetta's duties around that time had included picking up many, badly wounded, survivors, and dead, from fishing boats, which had been shelled by a German submarine, off the entrance to the Tyne. Perhaps unsurprisingly the crew of the Bonetta were not made aware of any massacre. The first lieutenant on board was to relate "A few weeks later we entered the Tyne for bunkers, which we obtained from a collier lying at Jarrow. Shortly after securing alongside the collier, a fishing vessel the 'Baden Powell' came alongside and her skipper invited the crew to help themselves to his catch, Apparently he was one of the survivors we had picked up and, on recognising our boat as we passed the fish market at North Shields, he had cast off the fish quay and come after us. On another occasion... we were ordered out to search for several German prisoners, who had succeeded in escaping from Stobo camp, near Peebles in South Scotland and had set off for Germany in a fishing boat, which they had taken from the beach, somewhere North of Blyth. We came across them about one hundred miles off the home coast at dusk, sailing along with a nice fair wind. If we had been a few minutes later they would probably have been quite safe as it would have been too dark for us to have spotted them. Needless to relate they were very disappointed when we 'closed them' and they did not show any eagerness to come on board when they were ordered to do so, but after firing a few rifle shots over their heads, they hastily scrambled on board, one of them injuring his leg in the process". She was sold for scrap to Thos. W. Ward on 7 June 1920 and broken up at their Briton Ferry shipbreaking yard.

== Pennant numbers ==
Pennant number	Date
D15	1914
D78	August 1915
D11	January 1918

== Bibliography ==
- Colledge, J. J.; Warlow, Ben (2006) [1969]. Ships of the Royal Navy: The Complete Record of All Fighting Ships of the Royal Navy from the 15th Century to the Present (3rd Rev ed.). London: Chatham Publishing. ISBN 978-1-86176-281-8. OCLC 67375475.
- Dittmar, F.J.; Colledge, J.J. (1972). British Warships 1914–1919. Shepperton, UK: Ian Allan. ISBN 0-7110-0380-7.
- Friedman, Norman (2009). British Destroyers: From Earliest Days to the Second World War. Barnsley, UK: Seaforth Publishing. ISBN 978-1-84832-049-9.
- Gardiner, Robert & Gray, Randal, eds. (1985). Conway's All The World's Fighting Ships 1906–1921. London: Conway Maritime Press. ISBN 0-85177-245-5.
- Lyon, David (2001) [1996]. The First Destroyers. London: Caxton Editions. ISBN 1-84067-3648.
- Manning, T. D. (1961). The British Destroyer. London: Putnam & Co. OCLC 6470051.
- March, Edgar J. (1966). British Destroyers: A History of Development, 1892–1953; Drawn by Admiralty Permission From Official Records & Returns, Ships' Covers & Building Plans. London: Seeley Service. OCLC 164893555.
