= USS Maumee (ID-1339) =

Collier of the United States Navy

History
- Name: 1897: Maylands; 1905: Veerhaven; 1915: Djursland; 1915: Maumee; 1923: Dorte Jensen
- Owner: 1897: J. F. Wilson & Co.; 1905: Van Uden Brothers; 1915: A. Jensen; 1915: American Transatlantic Co.; 1923: H. Jensen
- Builder: Furness Withy and Company, Ltd., West Hartlepool, England
- Yard number: 233
- Launched: 20 March 1897
- Completed: April 1897
- Fate: broken up at Genoa, 22 January 1924

History

United States
- Name: USS Maumee
- Acquired: 9 January 1918
- Commissioned: 9 January 1918

General characteristics
- Type: Collier
- Displacement: 5,617 long tons (5,707 t) light
- Length: 315 ft (96 m)
- Beam: 41 ft 9 in (12.73 m)
- Draft: 19 ft 2 in (5.84 m)
- Propulsion: Steam turbine; 1 × shaft
- Speed: 9.5 kn (10.9 mph; 17.6 km/h)

USS Maumee (ID-1339) was a United States Navy collier commissioned in 1918. The ship was built in 1897 by Furness Withy and Company, Ltd. at West Hartlepool, England as the cargo ship Maylands of J. F. Wilson & Company. The ship went through a progression of names and owners, becoming Veerhaven in 1905, and Djursland in 1915. Later in 1915, the ship was renamed Maumee after her purchase by the American Transatlantic Company. After the United States' entry into World War I, Maumee was acquired by the United States Navy on 9 January 1918 and commissioned the same day. Maumee was initially assigned to the Naval Overseas Transportation Service, but reassigned to the Destroyer Force on 18 April 1919.

The details of Maumee's decommissioning and subsequent release from U.S. Navy control are unknown. By 1923, she was operating under the name of Dorte Jensen for H. Jenson. According to ship registries, she was broken up on 22 January 1924 at Genoa. NavSource Online, however, reports that the vessel was transferred to the Republic of China Navy in 1948, but may have confused this ship with USS Maumee (AO-2), which was also in commission during the same time frame and was transferred to the Republic of China in 1948.
