= RMS Arabia =

British ocean liner (1897–1916)

Coordinates: 36°30′N 20°30′E

- RMS Arabia on a pre-war postcard

History
- Name: RMS Arabia
- Namesake: Arabia
- Owner: P&O
- Port of registry: (United Kingdom) Greenock
- Route: Tilbury – Bombay (1898–1914)
- Builder: Caird & Company, Greenock
- Cost: £250,000
- Yard number: 286
- Launched: 10 November 1897
- Completed: 12 March 1898
- Identification: UK official number 105587; code letters QBHS
- Fate: Sunk by torpedo, 6 November 1916

General characteristics
- Type: Ocean liner
- Tonnage: 7,903 GRT, 4,167 NRT
- Length: 499.9 feet (152.4 m) (pp)
- Beam: 54 feet (16 m)
- Draught: 26 feet 9 inches (8.15 m)
- Depth: 37.6 feet (11.5 m)
- Installed power: 11,000 ihp
- Propulsion: triple-expansion steam engine; single screw
- Speed: service: 16.5 knots (30.6 km/h) Max: 18 kn (33 km/h)
- Capacity: Passengers: 317 1st class, 152 2nd class; Cargo: 171,303 cubic feet (4,851 m^{3})
- Troops: 2,500
- Crew: 283 (116 Europeans and 167 lascars)
- Notes: Sister ships: China, Egypt, India, Persia

RMS Arabia was a P&O ocean liner. She was sunk in the Mediterranean Sea in 1916 by a German U-boat during World War I.

== History ==
Caird & Company built Arabia at Greenock on the River Clyde, launching her in November 1897 and completing her in March 1898. She had capacity for 317 first class and 152 second class passengers, a total of 469.

Arabia's route was between Tilbury, England and Bombay, India. On her maiden voyage she took Lord Kedleston to take up his post as Viceroy of India. In 1902 she took passengers to India for the 1903 Delhi Durbar.

On 15 March 1905 the 4,206 GRT cargo steamship Riverdale was manœuvreing in Bombay Harbour when she struck Arabia amidships on her port side, damaging the liner's promenade deck, boat deck and upper works. The collision was caused by Riverdale's chief engineer inexplicably setting her engine to go ahead when ordered to go astern.

On 12 October 1912 the steamship Powerful collided with Arabia in the English Channel off Southampton. Powerful's bow holed the crew toilet above the waterline, crushing lascar crewman Hassan Moosa to death.

In 1915 and 1916 Arabia made three voyages between Britain and Australia. On 6 November 1916 she was en route from Sydney via Fremantle to England when the German submarine UB-43 torpedoed her without warning 97 nautical miles (180 km) south by west of Cape Matapan, Greece, killing 11 of her engine room crew. Arabia launched her boats within 15 minutes. Four armed trawlers and Ellerman Lines' 8,204 GRT passenger liner City of Marseilles rescued survivors.

There were 187 Australians were aboard Arabia. Her sinking helped surge volunteer enlistment in the Australian armed forces.

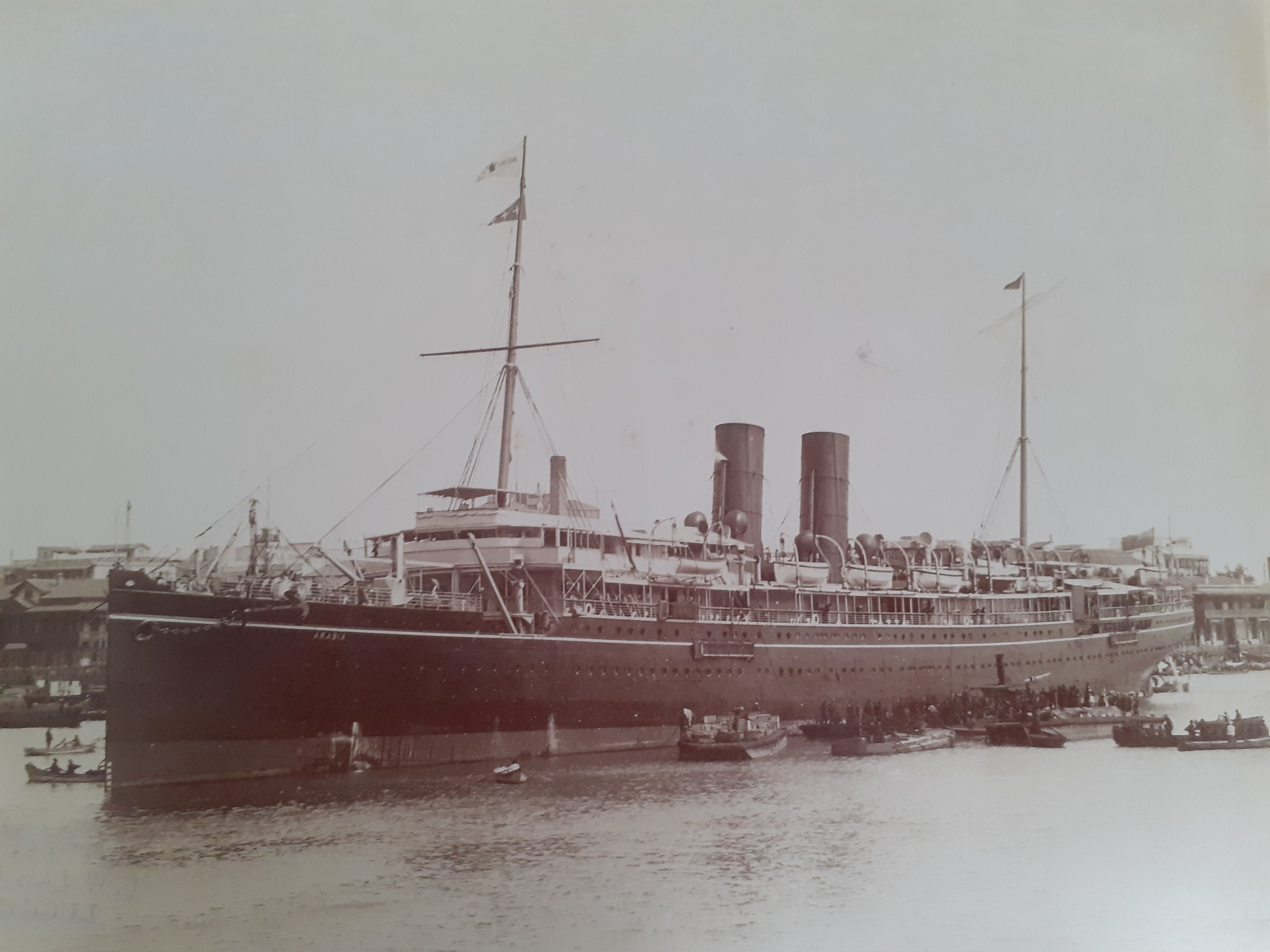
Arabia in October 1902 during a journey to India
