= HMS Sylvia (1897) =

Destroyer of the Royal Navy

History

United Kingdom
- Name: Sylvia
- Ordered: 1896 – 1897 Naval Estimates
- Builder: William Doxford and Sons Pallion, Sunderland
- Laid down: 13 July 1896
- Launched: 3 July 1897
- Commissioned: January 1899
- Out of service: Laid up in reserve 1919
- Fate: 23 July 1919 to Thos W Ward of Sheffield for breaking at New Holland, Lincolnshire on the Humber Estuary

General characteristics
- Class & type: Doxford three funnel - 30 knot destroyer
- Displacement: 400 long tons (406 t) deep load
- Length: 214 ft 2 in (65.28 m) o/a
- Beam: 21 ft (6.4 m) Beam
- Draught: 9 ft 7 in (2.92 m) Draught
- Propulsion: 4 × Thornycroft water tube boiler; 2 × Vertical Triple Expansion (VTE) steam engines driving 2 shafts producing 6,300 ihp (4,700 kW)
- Speed: 30 kn (56 km/h)
- Range: 95 tons coal; 1,615 nmi (2,991 km) at 11 kn (20 km/h)
- Complement: 63 officers and men
- Armament: 1 × QF 12-pounder 12 cwt Mark I L/40 naval gun on a P Mark I Low angle mount; 5 × QF 6-pdr 8 cwt naval gun L/40 Naval gun on a Mark I* low angle mount; 2 × single tubes for 18-inch (450mm) torpedoes

Service record
- Operations: World War I 1914 - 1918

HMS Sylvia was a Doxford three funnel - 30 knot destroyer ordered by the British Royal Navy under the 1896 – 1897 Naval Estimates, launched on 3 July 1897 and entering service in January 1899. She was the sixth ship to carry this name to serve with the Royal Navy.

Sylvia remained in service on the outbreak of the First World War, being employed for patrol and escort duties in home waters for the duration of the war, and taking part in the sinking of the German submarine UC-55 in September 1917. She was withdrawn from use in 1919 and sold for scrap later that year.

== Design ==
The British Admiralty placed orders for sixteen 30-knotter torpedo-boat destroyers as part of the 1896–1897 shipbuilding programme, as well as three "specials" intended to reach a higher speed. Two of the sixteen 30-knotters, Sylvia and Violet were ordered from William Doxford and Sons. As with other early Royal Navy destroyers, the detailed design of the Doxford ships was left to the builder, with the Admiralty laying down only broad requirements such as speed, armament and the use of a "turtleback" (Note: A fore deck with exaggerated camber designed to throw off sea water at high speeds.) forecastle.

Sylvia and Violet were enlarged and more powerful derivatives of Doxford's two 27-knotter destroyers ordered under the 1893–1894 Programme (Hardy and Haughty. They had an overall length of 214 ft (65.23 m) and a length between perpendiculars of 210 ft (64.01 m), a beam of 21 feet (6.40 m) and a draught of 9 ft 7 in (2.92 m). Displacement was 350 long tons (360 t) light and 400 long tons (410 t) deep load. Four coal-fired Thornycroft water tube boilers fed steam at 220 psi (1,500 kPa) to triple expansion steam engines rated at 6,300 indicated horsepower (4,700 kW) and driving two propeller shafts. Sufficient coal was carried to give a range of 1,530 nmi (1,760 mi; 2,830 km) at 11 kn (13 mph; 20 km/h). Three funnels were fitted.

Armament was the standard of the 30-Knotters, i.e. a QF 12 pounder 12 cwt (3 in (76 mm) calibre) gun on a platform on the ship's conning tower (in practice the platform was also used as the ship's bridge), with a secondary armament of five 6-pounder guns, and two 18-inch (450 mm) torpedo tubes. The ship had a crew of 58 officers and other ranks.

== Construction and career ==
Sylvia was laid down on 13 July 1896 as yard number 253 at the William Doxford and Sons shipyard at Pallion, Sunderland, and launched on 3 July 1897. Full power trials on 22 April 1898 and 22 July 1898 proved unsuccessful, with Sylvia being unable to meet the required speed. On 3 October 1894, another attempt at the 3 hour trial had to be stopped when a boiler tube burst, but later that month she was reported to have successfully carried out the required speed trials. During her builder's trials she made her contracted speed requirement. Sylvia was completed and accepted by the Royal Navy in January 1899. She was the fourth ship of that name built for the Royal Navy.

On 18 January 1899, Sylvia joined the Portsmouth Fleet Reserve. After commissioning she was assigned to the Portsmouth Instructional Flotilla and spent her entire career in Home Waters.

In March 1900 she was commissioned by Lieutenant William Bowden-Smith and the crew of HMS Chamois to take her place in the Instructional Flotilla.

She underwent repairs to re-tube her boilers during spring 1902, and was in the dockyard at Sheerness to repair defects in her steering gear in September that year.

On 30 August 1912 the Admiralty directed all destroyers were to be grouped into classes designated by letters based on contract speed and appearance. As a three-funnelled destroyer with a contract speed of 30 knots, Sylvia was assigned to the C class. The class letters were painted on the hull below the bridge area and on a funnel. In March 1913, Sylvia was listed as part of the 7th Destroyer Flotilla, a patrol flotilla based at Devonport and tendered to the depot ship Leander. Sylvia remained part of the 7th Flotilla on the eve of the First World War in July 1914.

=== World War I ===
The Patrol Flotillas had a role of defending the coast of Britain against enemy minelaying or torpedo craft, while providing warning of any larger raids by enemy warships. At the outbreak of war, the 7th Flotilla was redeployed to the Humber River for operations off the East coast of Britain. On 7 November, the 7th Flotilla was ordered to detach twelve destroyers to Scapa Flow to provide local defence of the Grand Fleet naval base, with Sylvia leaving for Scapa on 8 November.

While formally still attached to the Grand Fleet, by February 1917, Sylvia was part of the local defence force for the Orkneys, and was employed in escorting ships from Lerwick, Shetland from 17 February. On 23 March 1917, the German submarine UC-45 attacked and sunk the Norwegian steamer Blomwaag near Kinnaird Head with gunfire and demolition charges. On hearing gunfire, Sylvia came to investigate and forced the submarine to submerge. On 20 May, Sylvis was one of three destroyers escorting a convoy of seven merchant ships from Norway to Britain, when the German submarine U-19 torpedoed and sank the Norwegian steamer Arnfinn Jarl. Sylvia rescued Arnfinn Jarl's crew, then spotted U-19's periscope and attacked with a depth charge. Sylvia's commanding officer, Lieutenant Peter Shaw, was awarded a Distinguished Service Cross for Sylvia's response, which may have prevented U-19 from sinking more ships in the convoy. On 26 May, Sylvia was escorting another, east-bound, convoy when U-19 attacked again, sinking the Norwegian steamer Norway. Sylvia also attacked submarines with depth charges on 29 May and 5 June 1917.

On the morning of 29 September 1917, the minesweeping trawler Monravia sighted a submarine east of Lerwick, and Sylvia and the destroyer Arab were ordered out from Lerwick to investigate. The submarine was the German UC-55, which was waiting to lay mines on the approaches to Lerwick. At about 2:00 pm, UC-55 was preparing to lay mines when she suddenly lost control of her depth-keeping, and sank to below her rated diving depth before surfacing. She was then sighted by Monrovia and the destroyer Tirade, which was escorting a merchant ship, and both Sylvia and Tirade turned to attack the submarine, which was surrounded by hostile ships. Tirade hit UC-55 at least twice with 4-inch shells, while Sylvia's commanding officer also claimed to have hit the submarine with shellfire. UC-55, unable to dive, and with a jammed rudder, had no hope of escape, and her commanding officer ordered the submarine's crew to abandon ship and the submarine scuttled. UC-55 sank stern first just before Sylvia reached the submarine, dropping two depth charges, followed by Tirade, which dropped two more depth charges. There was a large underwater explosion, and UC-55 broke up. Nineteen of UC-55' crew survived, with Sylvia picking up ten men. Ten men were killed.

Sylvia was still listed as being attached to the Grand Fleet in January 1918, but by February had transferred to the Firth of Forth, in what became known as the Methil Convoy Flotilla. By May that year, Sylvia had moved again, rejoining the 7th Destroyer Flotilla based on the Humber. She remained part of the 7th Flotilla at the end of the First World War.

By March 1919 Sylvia was paid off and laid-up in reserve at the Humber awaiting disposal. HMS Sylvia was sold on 23 July 1919 to Thos. W. Ward of Sheffield for breaking at New Holland, Lincolnshire on the Humber Estuary.

== Pennant numbers ==
Pennant Number	From	To
D23	6 December 1914	1 September 1915
D69	1 September 1915	1 January 1918
D84	1 January 1918	April 1918
H03	April 1918	-

== Bibliography ==
- Brassey, T.A. (1902). The Naval Annual 1902. Portsmouth, UK: J. Griffin and Co.
- Chesneau, Roger & Kolesnik, Eugene M., eds. (1979). Conway's All The World's Fighting Ships 1860–1905. London: Conway Maritime Press. ISBN 0-85177-133-5.
- Colledge, J. J.; Warlow, Ben (2006) [1969]. Ships of the Royal Navy: The Complete Record of All Fighting Ships of the Royal Navy from the 15th Century to the Present (3rd Rev ed.). London: Chatham Publishing. ISBN 978-1-86176-281-8. OCLC 67375475.
- Corbett, Julian S. (1920). History of the Great War: Naval Operations: Vol. I: To the Battle of the Falklands December 1914. London: Longmans, Green and Co.
- Dittmar, F. J. & Colledge, J. J. (1972). British Warships 1914–1919. Shepperton, UK: Ian Allan. ISBN 0-7110-0380-7.
- Friedman, Norman (2009). British Destroyers: From Earliest Days to the Second World War. Barnsley, UK: Seaforth Publishing. ISBN 978-1-84832-049-9.
- Gardiner, Robert & Gray, Randal, eds. (1985). Conway's All The World's Fighting Ships 1906–1921. London: Conway Maritime Press. ISBN 0-85177-245-5.
- Gardiner, Robert; Lambert, Andrew, eds. (1992). Steam, Steel & Shellfire: The Steam Warship 1815–1905. Conway's History of the Ship. London: Conway Maritime Press. ISBN 0-85177-564-0.
- Kemp, Paul (1997). U-Boats Destroyed: German Submarine Losses in the World Wars. London: Arms & Armour Press. ISBN 1-85409-321-5.
- Lyon, David (2001) [1996]. The First Destroyers. London: Caxton Editions. ISBN 1-84067-3648.
- Manning, T. D. (1961). The British Destroyer. London: Putnam & Co. OCLC 6470051.
- Monograph No. 7: The Patrol Flotillas at the Commencement of the War (PDF). Naval Staff Monographs (Historical). Vol. III. The Naval Staff, Training and Staff Duties Division. 1921. pp. 71–107. Archived from the original (PDF) on 1 March 2023.
- Monograph No. 34: Home Waters—Part VIII: December 1916 to April 1917. Naval Staff Monographs (Historical). Vol. XVIII. The Naval Staff, Training and Staff Duties Division. 1933. part 1 of 4 (pp. 1–121), part 2 of 4 (pp. 122–265), part 3 of 4 (pp. 266–405), part 4 of 4 (pp. 406–532).
- Monograph No. 35: Home Waters—Part IX: 1st May, 1917 to 31st July, 1917. Naval Staff Monographs (Historical). Vol. XIX. The Naval Staff, Training and Staff Duties Division. 1939. part 1 of 3 (pp. 1–119), part 2 of 3 (pp. 120–251), part 3 of 3 (pp. 252–373).
- Williams, M. W. (1997). "HMS Tirade and the sinking of UC-55". In McLean, David; Preston, Antony (eds.). Warship 1997-1998. London: Conway Maritime. ISBN 978-0-85177-722-1.
