= HMS Osprey (1897) =

Destroyer of the Royal Navy

History

United Kingdom
- Name: Osprey
- Ordered: 1896 – 1897 Naval Estimates
- Builder: Fairfield Shipbuilding and Engineering Company, Govan, Glasgow
- Laid down: 14 November 1896
- Launched: 7 April 1897
- Commissioned: July 1898
- Out of service: December 1918 paid off and laid up in reserve awaiting disposal
- Fate: 4 November 1919 sold to J.H. Lee of Dover for breaking

General characteristics
- Class & type: Fairfield three-funnel, 30-knot destroyer
- Displacement: 355 long tons (361 t) standard; 400 long tons (406 t) full load
- Length: 215 ft 6 in (65.68 m) o/a
- Beam: 21 ft (6.4 m)
- Draught: 8 ft 2 in (2.49 m)
- Installed power: 6,000 shp (4,500 kW)
- Propulsion: 4 × Thornycroft water tube boilers; 2 × vertical triple-expansion steam engines; 2 × shafts
- Speed: 30 kn (56 km/h; 35 mph)
- Range: 80 tons coal; 1,615 nmi (2,991 km) at 11 kn (20 km/h)
- Complement: 63 officers and men
- Armament: 1 × QF 12-pounder 12 cwt Mark I L/40 gun on a P Mark I Low angle mount; 5 × QF 6-pdr 8 cwt gun L/40 on a Mark I * low angle mount; 2 × single tubes for 18-inch (450mm) torpedoes

HMS Osprey was a three-funnel, 30-knot destroyer ordered by the Royal Navy under the 1896–1897 Naval Estimates from Fairfields. She was the fifth ship to carry this name since it was introduced in 1797 for an 18-gun ship-sloop.

== Construction and career ==
She was laid down as yard number 397 on 14 November 1896 at the Fairfield shipyard at Govan, Glasgow and launched on 7 April 1897. During her builder's trials, she made her contracted speed requirement. She was completed and accepted by the Royal Navy in July 1898. After commissioning she was assigned to the Portsmouth Flotilla of the 1st Fleet.

On 2 February 1900 she was commissioned as tender to HMS Vivid, shore establishment at Devonport, for service in the Devonport Instructional flotilla, and Lieutenant Godfrey Edwin Corbett was appointed in command. In May 1902 she underwent repairs to re-tube her boilers.

Osprey, a member of the Fourth Destroyer Flotilla based at Portsmouth, collided with the destroyer Bonetta while leaving Berehaven harbour on 5 July 1911. While Osprey was undamaged, Bonetta's bows were damaged. On 30 August 1912 the Admiralty directed all destroyers were to be grouped into classes designated by letters based on contract speed and appearance. As a three-funneled destroyer with a contract speed of 30 knots, Osprey was assigned to the C class. The class letters were painted on the hull below the bridge area and on a funnel.

=== World War I ===
For the test mobilization in July 1914 she was assigned to the 8th Destroyer Flotilla based at Chatham. Here she provided local anti-submarine and counter-mining patrols. In August 1914 she had been redeployed to the Scapa Flow Local Flotilla to provide anti-submarine patrols for the fleet anchorage until the defences of Scapa Flow could be improved.

She was deployed to the North Channel patrol and based at Larne, Ireland in November 1916. Her deployment included anti-submarine and counter-mining patrols as well as contraband enforcement. She was attached to the 2nd Destroyer Flotilla when it was transferred to Londonderry in 1918, and remained based at Larne.

In 1919 Osprey was paid off and laid-up in reserve awaiting disposal. She was sold on 4 November 1919 to J.H. Lee of Dover for breaking.

She was awarded the battle honour "Belgian Coast 1914 – 17" for her service.

== Pennant numbers ==
Pennant number	From	To
P80	6 December 1914	1 September 1915
D64	1 September 1915	1 January 1918

== Bibliography ==
- Chesneau, Roger & Kolesnik, Eugene M., eds. (1979). Conway's All The World's Fighting Ships 1860–1905. London: Conway Maritime Press. ISBN 0-85177-133-5.
- Colledge, J. J.; Warlow, Ben (2006) [1969]. Ships of the Royal Navy: The Complete Record of All Fighting Ships of the Royal Navy from the 15th Century to the Present (3rd Rev ed.). London: Chatham Publishing. ISBN 978-1-86176-281-8. OCLC 67375475.
- Dittmar, F. J. & Colledge, J. J. (1972). British Warships 1914–1919. Shepperton, UK: Ian Allan. ISBN 0-7110-0380-7.
- Friedman, Norman (2009). British Destroyers: From Earliest Days to the Second World War. Barnsley, UK: Seaforth Publishing. ISBN 978-1-84832-049-9.
- Gardiner, Robert & Gray, Randal, eds. (1985). Conway's All The World's Fighting Ships 1906–1921. London: Conway Maritime Press. ISBN 0-85177-245-5.
- Lyon, David (2001) [1996]. The First Destroyers. London: Caxton Editions. ISBN 1-84067-3648.
- Manning, T. D. (1961). The British Destroyer. London: Putnam & Co. OCLC 6470051.
- March, Edgar J. (1966). British Destroyers: A History of Development, 1892–1953; Drawn by Admiralty Permission From Official Records & Returns, Ships' Covers & Building Plans. London: Seeley Service. OCLC 164893555.
