= HMS Violet (1897) =

Destroyer of the Royal Navy

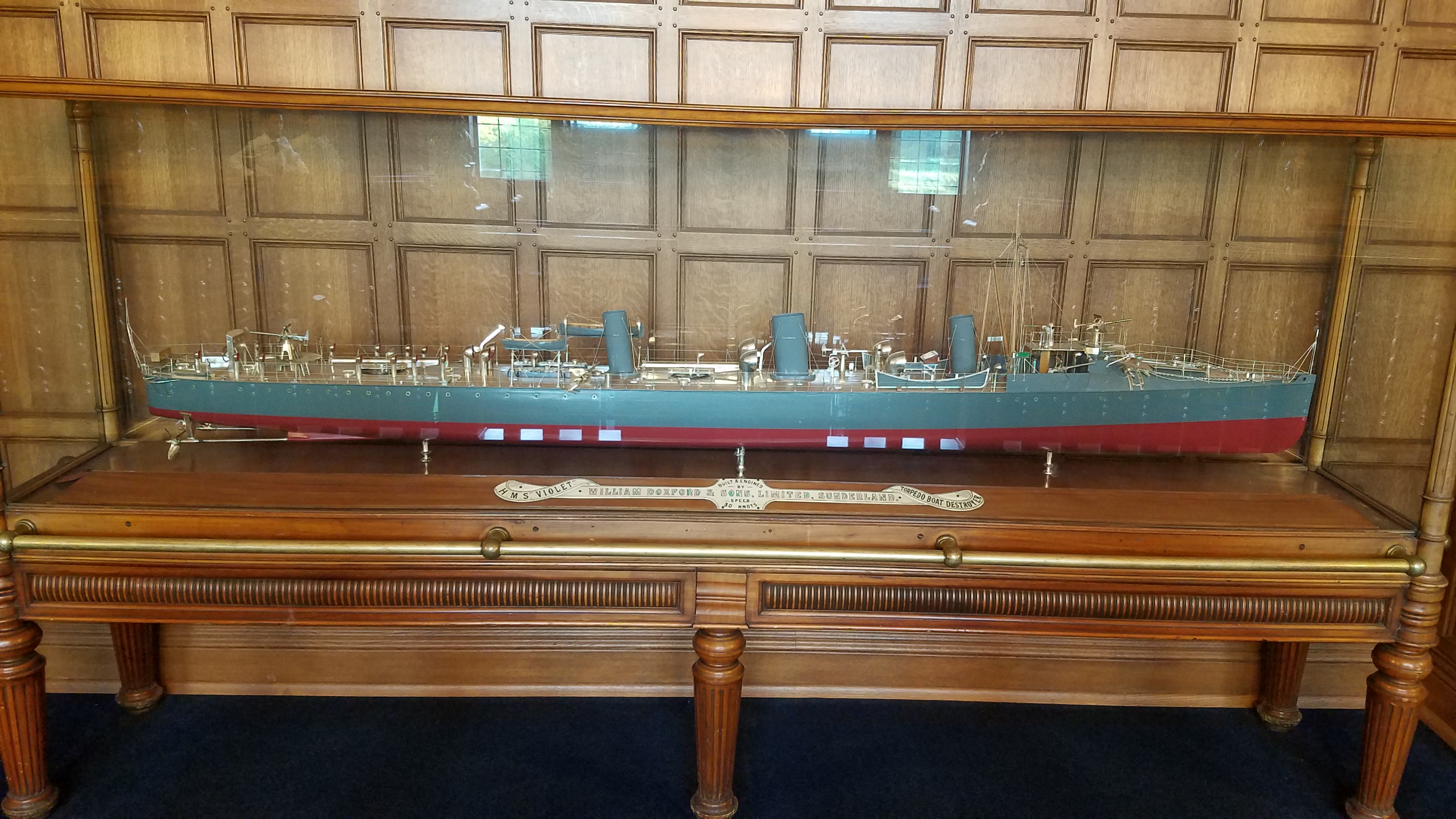
- HMS Violet scale model located at Olde World Canterbury Village in Lake Orion, MI

History

United Kingdom
- Name: Violet
- Ordered: 1896 – 1897 Naval Estimates
- Builder: William Doxford and Sons Pallion, Sunderland
- Laid down: 13 July 1896
- Launched: 3 May 1897
- Commissioned: June 1898
- Out of service: Laid up in reserve 1919
- Fate: Sold for breaking, 7 June 1920

General characteristics
- Class & type: Doxford three-funnel, 30-knot destroyer
- Displacement: 350 long tons (356 t) standard; 400 long tons (406 t) full load
- Length: 214 ft (65 m) o/a
- Beam: 21 ft (6.4 m)
- Draught: 9 ft 7 in (2.92 m)
- Installed power: 6,300 shp (4,700 kW)
- Propulsion: 4 × Thornycroft water tube boilers; 2 × vertical triple-expansion steam engines; 2 × shafts
- Speed: 30 kn (56 km/h)
- Range: 1,530 nmi (2,830 km) at 11 kn (20 km/h; 13 mph)
- Complement: 58 officers and men
- Armament: 1 × QF 12-pounder 12 cwt Mark I L/40 naval gun; 5 × QF 6-pdr 8 cwt L/40 naval gun; 2 × single tubes for 18-inch (450mm) torpedoes

Service record
- Operations: World War I 1914 - 1918

HMS Violet was a Doxford three-funnel, 30-knot destroyer ordered by the Royal Navy under the 1896–1897 Naval Estimates.

== Design ==
The British Admiralty placed orders for sixteen 30-knotter torpedo-boat destroyers as part of the 1896–1897 shipbuilding programme, as well as three "specials" intended to reach a higher speed. Two of the sixteen 30-knotters, Violet and Sylvia were ordered from William Doxford and Sons. As with other early Royal Navy destroyers, the detailed design of the Doxford ships was left to the builder, with the Admiralty laying down only broad requirements such as speed, armament and the use of a "turtleback" (Note: A fore deck with exaggerated camber designed to throw off sea water at high speeds.) forecastle.

Violet and Sylvia were enlarged and more powerful derivatives of Doxford's two 27-knotter destroyers ordered under the 1893–1894 Programme (Hardy and Haughty. They had an overall length of 214 ft (65.23 m) and a length between perpendiculars of 210 ft (64.01 m), a beam of 21 feet (6.40 m) and a draught of 9 ft 7 in (2.92 m). Displacement was 350 long tons (360 t) light and 400 long tons (410 t) deep load. Four coal-fired Thornycroft water tube boilers fed steam at 220 psi (1,500 kPa) to triple expansion steam engines rated at 6,300 indicated horsepower (4,700 kW) and driving two propeller shafts. Sufficient coal was carried to give a range of 1,530 nmi (1,760 mi; 2,830 km) at 11 kn (13 mph; 20 km/h). Three funnels were fitted.

Armament was the standard of the 30-Knotters, i.e. a QF 12 pounder 12 cwt (3 in (76 mm) calibre) gun on a platform on the ship's conning tower (in practice the platform was also used as the ship's bridge), with a secondary armament of five 6-pounder guns, and two 18-inch (450 mm) torpedo tubes. The ship had a crew of 58 officers and other ranks.

== Construction and career ==
Violet was laid down on 13 July 1896, at Doxford's shipyard in Pallion, Sunderland as yard number 252, and launched on 3 May 1897. During sea trials, she made her 30 kn (35 mph; 56 km/h) contracted speed requirement. She was completed and accepted by the Royal Navy in June 1898 as the seventh ship of that name to serve with the Royal Navy. After commissioning she was assigned to the Fleet Reserve at Portsmouth. She spent her entire career in home waters.

On the night of 23 June 1900, during an exercise, Violet and the destroyer Fawn attempted to rush the defences of Portsmouth harbour, approaching with no lights and at a low speed so that smoke or flame from their funnels would not indicate their location, but Violet was spotted at a range of 2 nmi (2.3 mi; 3.7 km) and illuminated and held by searchlights, as was Fawn, with the conclusion drawn that they could not have succeeded in breaching the defences. On the night of 25 July 1900, Violet collided with the destroyer Flirt in fog, badly damaging Violet's bow, such that she had to be docked down in Pembroke Dockyard for repairs. Flirt received little damage. Violet underwent repairs to re-tube her boilers in 1902. On 9 July 1907 Violet collided with a sailing vessel, badly damaging the destroyer's bow and slightly injuring three of her crew. She was towed stern first to the Nore by the destroyer Falcon before being taken into Sheerness for repair. Violet was refitted at Pembroke Dockyard in 1909, having her bow replated and her boilers retubed.

On 30 August 1912 the Admiralty directed all destroyers were to be grouped into classes designated by letters based on contract speed and appearance. As a three-funnelled destroyer with a contract speed of 30 knots, Violet was assigned to the C class. The class letters were painted on the hull below the bridge area and on a funnel. In March 1913, Violet was listed as part of the 7th Destroyer Flotilla, a patrol flotilla based at Devonport and tendered to the depot ship Leander. On 1 June 1913, Violet was in collision with the destroyer Lively off Felixstowe. Violet remained part of the 7th Flotilla on the eve of the First World War in July 1914.

=== World War I ===
At the outbreak of war, the 7th Flotilla was redeployed to the Humber River for operations off the East coast of Britain. Duties of the Flotilla were to prevent enemy ships from carrying out minelaying or torpedo attacks in the approaches to ports on the East coast, and to prevent raids by enemy ships. Violet served with the 7th Flotilla until June 1917, but by July that year she was listed as part of the East Coast Convoy Flotilla. By September she had been sent to join the local defence flotilla at the Nore.

In April 1918 she was reassigned to the 6th Destroyer Flotilla and the Dover Patrol. She remained in this deployment at the end of the First World War. Her duties included anti-submarine, counter-mining patrols, and patrolling the Dover Barrage.

By January 1919, Violet was listed as temporarily at the Nore, but had moved to Devonport by February. In 1919 she was paid off and laid-up in reserve, awaiting disposal. Violet was sold on 7 June 1920 to J Houston of Montrose for breaking.

Post World War I

Stripped down to a Hulk Violet was towed to a position upstream of the Kincardine Bridge, Fife to strengthen the sea wall where she remained until 1959 when she was finally broken up to make way for the new Power Station

== Pennant numbers ==
Pennant number	From	To
D09	6 December 1914	1 September 1915
D73	1 September 1915	1 January 1918
D94	1 January 1918	7 June 1920

== Bibliography ==
- Brassey, T.A. (1902). The Naval Annual 1902. Portsmouth, UK: J. Griffin and Co.
- Chesneau, Roger & Kolesnik, Eugene M., eds. (1979). Conway's All The World's Fighting Ships 1860–1905. London: Conway Maritime Press. ISBN 0-85177-133-5.
- Colledge, J. J.; Warlow, Ben (2006) [1969]. Ships of the Royal Navy: The Complete Record of All Fighting Ships of the Royal Navy from the 15th Century to the Present (3rd Rev ed.). London: Chatham Publishing. ISBN 978-1-86176-281-8. OCLC 67375475.
- Corbett, Julian S. (1920). History of the Great War: Naval Operations: Vol. I: To the Battle of the Falklands December 1914. London: Longmans, Green and Co.
- Dittmar, F. J. & Colledge, J. J. (1972). British Warships 1914–1919. Shepperton, UK: Ian Allan. ISBN 0-7110-0380-7.
- Friedman, Norman (2009). British Destroyers: From Earliest Days to the Second World War. Barnsley, UK: Seaforth Publishing. ISBN 978-1-84832-049-9.
- Gardiner, Robert & Gray, Randal, eds. (1985). Conway's All The World's Fighting Ships 1906–1921. London: Conway Maritime Press. ISBN 0-85177-245-5.
- Gardiner, Robert; Lambert, Andrew, eds. (1992). Steam, Steel & Shellfire: The Steam Warship 1815–1905. Conway's History of the Ship. London: Conway Maritime Press. ISBN 0-85177-564-0.
- Lyon, David (2001) [1996]. The First Destroyers. London: Caxton Editions. ISBN 1-84067-3648.
- Manning, T. D. (1961). The British Destroyer. London: Putnam & Co. OCLC 6470051.
- March, Edgar J. (1966). British Destroyers: A History of Development, 1892–1953; Drawn by Admiralty Permission From Official Records & Returns, Ships' Covers & Building Plans. London: Seeley Service. OCLC 164893555.
- Monograph No. 7: The Patrol Flotillas at the Commencement of the War (PDF). Naval Staff Monographs (Historical). Vol. III. The Naval Staff, Training and Staff Duties Division. 1921. pp. 71–107. Archived from the original (PDF) on 1 March 2023.
