= HMS Gipsy (1897) =

Destroyer of the Royal Navy

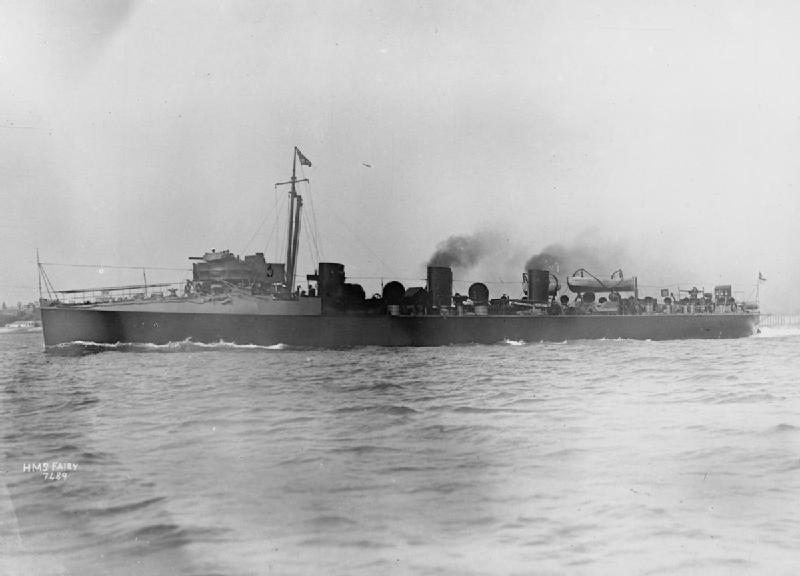
- Gipsy's sister-ship, Fairy

History

United Kingdom
- Name: Gipsy
- Ordered: 1896 – 1897 Naval Estimates
- Builder: Fairfield Shipbuilding and Engineering Company, Govan
- Cost: £54,363
- Yard number: 395
- Laid down: 1 October 1896
- Launched: 9 March 1897
- Commissioned: July 1898
- Out of service: December 1918
- Fate: Sold for breaking, 17 March 1921

General characteristics
- Class & type: Fairfield three-funnel, 30 knot destroyer
- Displacement: 355 long tons (361 t) standard; 400 long tons (406 t) full load
- Length: 215 ft 6 in (65.68 m) oa
- Beam: 21 ft (6.4 m)
- Draught: 8 ft 2 in (2.49 m)
- Installed power: 6,300 ihp (4,700 kW)
- Propulsion: 4 × Thornycroft water tube boilers; 2 × vertical triple-expansion steam engines; 2 shafts
- Speed: 30 kn (56 km/h)
- Range: 85 tons coal; 1,615 nmi (2,991 km) at 11 kn (20 km/h)
- Complement: 63 officers and men
- Armament: 1 × QF 12-pounder 12 cwt Mark I L/40 naval gun on a P Mark I low angle mount; 5 × QF 6-pdr 8 cwt naval gun on a Mark I * low angle mount; 2 × single tubes for 18-inch (450mm) torpedoes

HMS Gipsy was a Fairfield-built three-funnel, 30 knot torpedo boat destroyer ordered by the Royal Navy under the 1896 – 1897 Naval Estimates. She was the fourth ship to carry this name. Designated as a C-class destroyer in 1913, Gipsy served on patrol in the First World War operating out of Dover. She was sold for breaking in 1921.

== Construction and career ==
An invitation to tender was sent out on 5 October 1895. She was laid down as yard no 395 on 1 October 1896 at the Fairfield shipyard at Govan, Glasgow and launched on 9 March 1897. During her builder's trials she made her contracted speed requirement. She was completed and accepted by the Royal Navy in July 1898.

In April 1901 she was commissioned at Devonport dockyard by Lieutenant and Commander H L Wells to take the place of HMS Seal in the dockyard's instructional flotilla. Lieutenant John Gilbert de O. Coke was appointed in command in March 1902, when she was replaced in the flotilla. She was re-commissioned by Commander William George Elmhirst Ruck-Keene and the crew of HMS Vixen on 31 July 1902, and replaced the latter ship in the instructional flotilla. She took part in the fleet review held at Spithead on 16 August 1902 for the coronation of King Edward VII, and afterwards served as escort to the royal yacht Victoria and Albert during the King's August 1902 cruise along the British Isles. She was back in the instructional flotilla the following month.

On 10 September 1909 Gipsy, on her way to Belfast to have her boilers retubed, ran aground in fog in Belfast Lough. Her hull was holed, with both propellers damaged and one propeller shaft bent. She was refloated two hours later and underwent repair at Harland and Wolff in Belfast.

On 30 August 1912 the Admiralty directed that all destroyer classes were to be designated by alphabetic characters; the first being 'A'. Since her design speed was 30-knots and she had three funnels she was assigned to the C class along with similar ships from other builders. After 30 September 1913, she was known as a C-class destroyer and had the letter 'C' painted on the hull below the bridge area and on either the fore or aft funnel.

=== World War I ===
From August 1914 to November 1918 she was deployed in the 6th Destroyer Flotilla based at Dover. While employed with the 6th Flotilla she conducted counter-mining patrols, escorted merchant ships and patrolled in defence of the Dover Barrage.

On 24 November 1917 the German submarine U-48 ran aground on the Goodwin Sands and was caught by British patrol craft including Gipsy and five drifters. After a brief exchange of gunfire, the crew of U-48 set off scuttling charges. U-48 suffered 19 dead with 17 survivors rescued by the British. On the night of 19/20 December 1917, the German submarine UB-56 struck a mine while trying to pass submerged westbound through the Dover Barrage. Gipsy picked up a single survivor from the submarine who died shortly afterwards. Gipsy was awarded the battle honour "Belgian Coast 1914 – 17" for her service.

In 1919 Gipsy was paid off and laid-up in reserve awaiting disposal. She was sold on 17 March 1921 to C.A. Beard of Teignmouth for breaking. Her hull was used as a pontoon for a jetty at Dartmouth and was still in use as late as 1972.

== Pennant numbers ==
Pennant number	From	To
P23	6 December 1914	1 September 1915
D58	1 September 1915	1 January 1918
D43	1 January 1918	17 March 1921

== Bibliography ==
- Bacon, Reginald (1918). The Dover Patrol 1915–1917. Vol. II. London: Hutchinson & Son.
- Chesneau, Roger & Kolesnik, Eugene M., eds. (1979). Conway's All The World's Fighting Ships 1860–1905. London: Conway Maritime Press. ISBN 0-85177-133-5.
- Colledge, J. J.; Warlow, Ben (2006) [1969]. Ships of the Royal Navy: The Complete Record of All Fighting Ships of the Royal Navy from the 15th Century to the Present (3rd Rev ed.). London: Chatham Publishing. ISBN 978-1-86176-281-8. OCLC 67375475.
- Dittmar, F. J. & Colledge, J. J. (1972). British Warships 1914–1919. Shepperton, UK: Ian Allan. ISBN 0-7110-0380-7.
- Friedman, Norman (2009). British Destroyers: From Earliest Days to the Second World War. Barnsley, UK: Seaforth Publishing. ISBN 978-1-84832-049-9.
- Gardiner, Robert & Gray, Randal, eds. (1985). Conway's All The World's Fighting Ships 1906–1921. London: Conway Maritime Press. ISBN 0-85177-245-5.
- Grant, Robert M. (1964). U-Boats Destroyed: The Effects of Anti-Submarine Warfare 1914–1918. London: Putnam.
- Hepper, David; Conway, Michael S. (June 2021). "Question 18/57". Warship International. LVIII (2): 100–101. ISSN 0043-0374.
- Jane, Fred T. (1969) [1898]. Jane’s All the World's Fighting Ships 1898. New York: first published by Sampson Low Marston, London 1898, Reprinted ARCO Publishing Company.
- Jane, Fred T. (1990) [1919]. Jane’s Fighting Ships of World War I. Jane’s Publishing. ISBN 1 85170 378 0.
- Lyon, David (2001) [1996]. The First Destroyers. London: Caxton Editions. ISBN 1-84067-3648.
- Manning, T. D. (1961). The British Destroyer. London: Putnam & Co. OCLC 6470051.
- March, Edgar J. (1966). British Destroyers: A History of Development, 1892–1953; Drawn by Admiralty Permission From Official Records & Returns, Ships' Covers & Building Plans. London: Seeley Service. OCLC 164893555.
