= HMS Fairy (1897) =

Destroyer of the Royal Navy

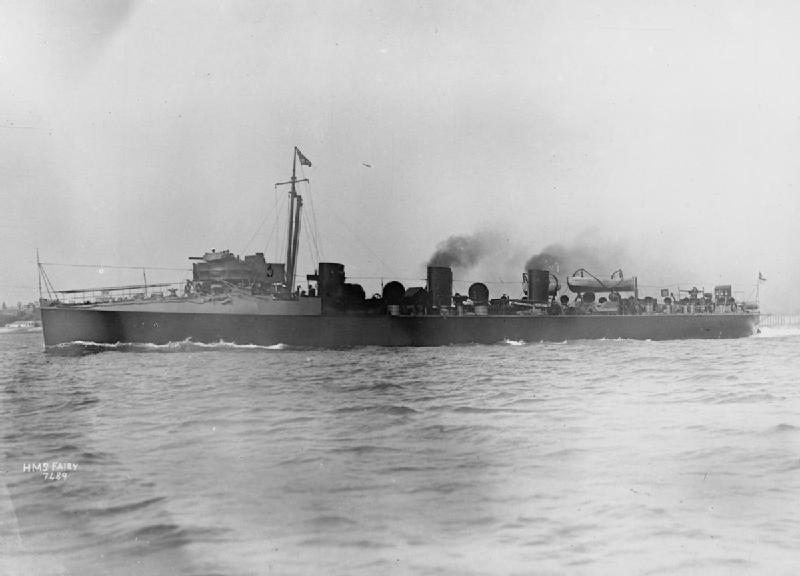
- HMS Fairy

History

United Kingdom
- Name: Fairy
- Ordered: 1896 – 1897 Naval Estimates
- Builder: Fairfield Shipbuilding and Engineering Company, Govan, Glasgow
- Laid down: 19 October 1896
- Launched: 29 May 1897
- Commissioned: August 1898
- Fate: Foundered after ramming, 31 May 1918

General characteristics
- Class & type: Fairfield three-funnel, 30-knot destroyer
- Displacement: 355 long tons (361 t) standard; 400 long tons (406 t) full load
- Length: 215 ft 6 in (65.68 m) o/a
- Beam: 21 ft (6.4 m)
- Draught: 8 ft 2 in (2.49 m)
- Installed power: 6,000 shp (4,500 kW)
- Propulsion: 4 × Thornycroft water tube boilers; 2 × vertical triple-expansion steam engines; 2 × shafts
- Speed: 30 kn (56 km/h)
- Range: 80 tons coal; 1,615 nmi (2,991 km) at 11 kn (20 km/h; 13 mph)
- Complement: 63 officers and men
- Armament: 1 × QF 12-pounder 12 cwt Mark I L/40 naval gun on a P Mark I low angle mount; 5 × QF 6 pdr 8 cwt naval gun on a Mark I * low angle mount; 2 × single tubes for 18-inch (450 mm) torpedoes

HMS Fairy was a three-funnel, 30-knot destroyer of the First World War. One of three similar ships built by Fairfields for the Royal Navy, she was ordered under the 1896–1897 Naval Estimates and the sixth Royal Navy ship to carry this name. She was classified, along with other similar ships, as a C-class destroyer in 1913. She sank in 1918 from damage inflicted by ramming and sinking the German submarine UC-75.

== Construction and career ==
She was laid down as Yard No 396 on 19 October 1896, at the Fairfield shipyard at Govan, Glasgow, and launched on 29 May 1897. During her builder's trials, she made her contracted speed requirement. She was completed and accepted by the Royal Navy in August 1898. After commissioning she was assigned to the Channel Fleet. She spent her operational career mainly in Home Waters operating with the Channel Fleet as part of the East Coast Flotilla.

On 2 February 1900, she was commissioned as tender to HMS Vivid, shore establishment at Devonport, for service in the Devonport Instructional flotilla, A mere week into her commission, Fairy dragged her moorings while in the Falmouth harbour, and had her bow on the starboard side and her stem badly damaged as she drifted into other ships of the flotilla. Following repairs in Devonport, she was back in the flotilla later that Spring. She underwent repairs to re-tube her boilers in May 1902. Fairy was refitted in 1908, having her boilers retubed.

On 30 August 1912, the Admiralty directed that all destroyer classes were to be designated by letter. She was assigned to the C Class, along with other destroyers with a design speed of 30 knots (56 km/h; 35 mph) with three funnels, and after 30 September 1913, she was known as a "C-class destroyer" and had the letter ‘C’ painted on the hull below the bridge area and on either the fore or aft funnel.

=== World War I ===
From August 1914, she was deployed in the 8th Destroyer Flotilla based at the Firth of Forth, but the next month detached from that formation. By October, she was attached to the Grand Fleet. In July 1917, she was transferred to the 7th Destroyer Flotilla, on the east coast of England, where she would be engaged in convoy work.

On 31 May 1918, while Fairy was escorting an East Coast convoy, the German submarine UC-75 was sighted and rammed by the steamer SS Blaydonian. The U-boat surfaced within the convoy and was attacked and rammed by HMS Fairy. Two submariners leapt onto the destroyer's forecastle as their submarine sank. Fairy, however, had sustained heavy damage and sank a short time later about 10 miles (16 km) south of Flamborough Head. (Note: Loss of HMS Fairy was recorded at position 53°57′N 000°09′W)

She was awarded the battle honour "Belgian Coast 1914–17" for her service.

== Pennant numbers ==
Pennant number	From	To
P40	6 December 1914	1 September 1915
D53	1 September 1915	1 January 1918
D35	1 January 1918	31 May 1918

== Bibliography ==
- Chesneau, Roger & Kolesnik, Eugene M., eds. (1979). Conway's All The World's Fighting Ships 1860–1905. London: Conway Maritime Press. ISBN 0-85177-133-5.
- Colledge, J. J.; Warlow, Ben (2006) [1969]. Ships of the Royal Navy: The Complete Record of All Fighting Ships of the Royal Navy from the 15th Century to the Present (3rd Rev ed.). London: Chatham Publishing. ISBN 978-1-86176-281-8. OCLC 67375475.
- Dittmar, F. J. & Colledge, J. J. (1972). British Warships 1914–1919. Shepperton, UK: Ian Allan. ISBN 0-7110-0380-7.
- Friedman, Norman (2009). British Destroyers: From Earliest Days to the Second World War. Barnsley, UK: Seaforth Publishing. ISBN 978-1-84832-049-9.
- Gardiner, Robert & Gray, Randal, eds. (1985). Conway's All The World's Fighting Ships 1906–1921. London: Conway Maritime Press. ISBN 0-85177-245-5.
- Hepper, David; Conway, Michael S. (June 2021). "Question 18/57". Warship International. LVIII (2): 100–101. ISSN 0043-0374.
- Lyon, David (2001) [1996]. The First Destroyers. London: Caxton Editions. ISBN 1-84067-3648.
- Manning, T. D. (1961). The British Destroyer. London: Putnam & Co. OCLC 6470051.
- March, Edgar J. (1966). British Destroyers: A History of Development, 1892–1953; Drawn by Admiralty Permission From Official Records & Returns, Ships' Covers & Building Plans. London: Seeley Service. OCLC 164893555.
