= June 1900 =

Month in 1900

<<	June 1900					>>
Su	Mo	Tu	We	Th	Fr	Sa
					1	2
3	4	5	6	7	8	9
10	11	12	13	14	15	16
17	18	19	20	21	22	23
24	25	26	27	28	29	30

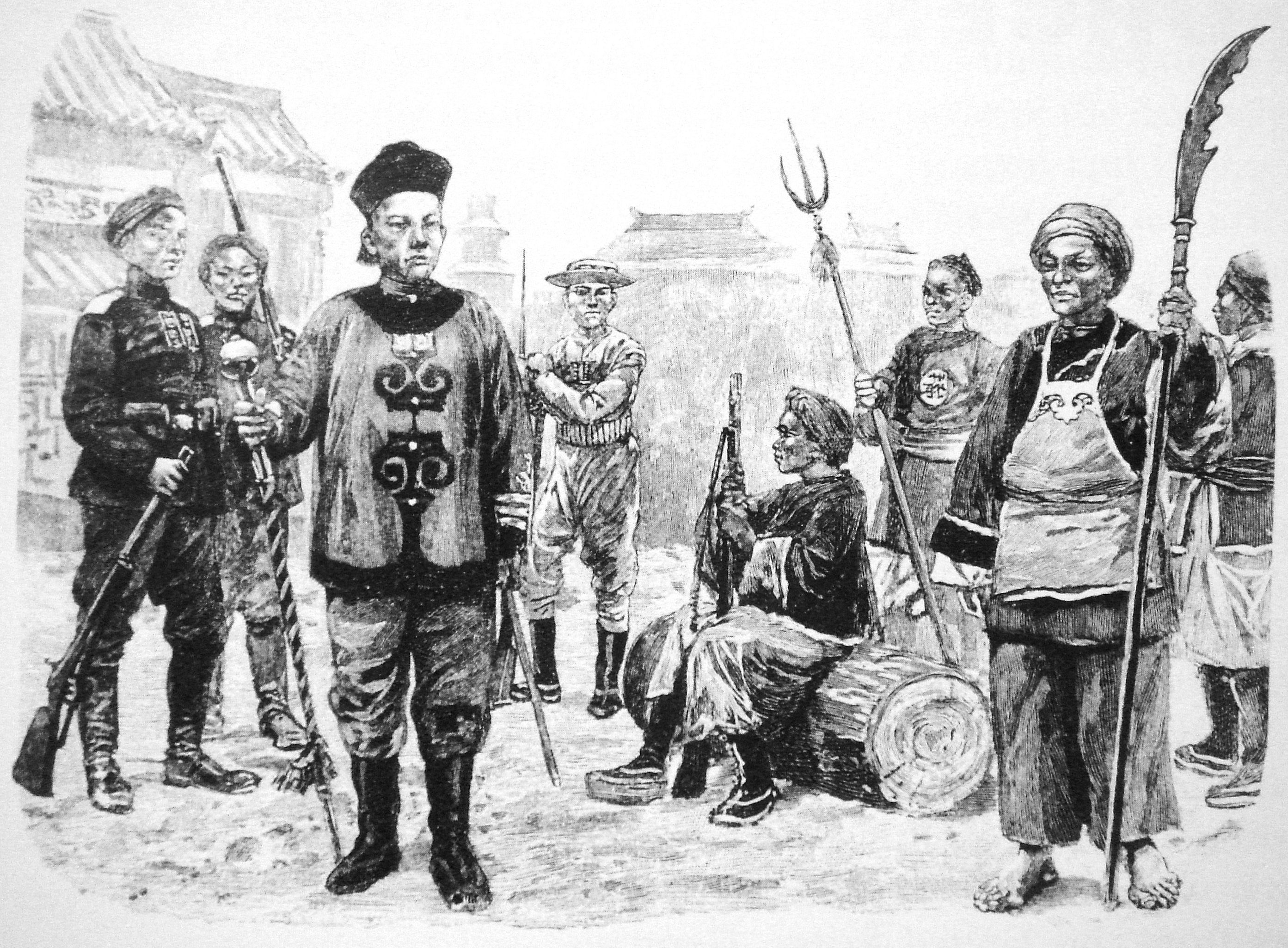
June 19, 1900: Righteous Fists group gives foreign diplomats 24-hour ultimatum to get out of Beijing

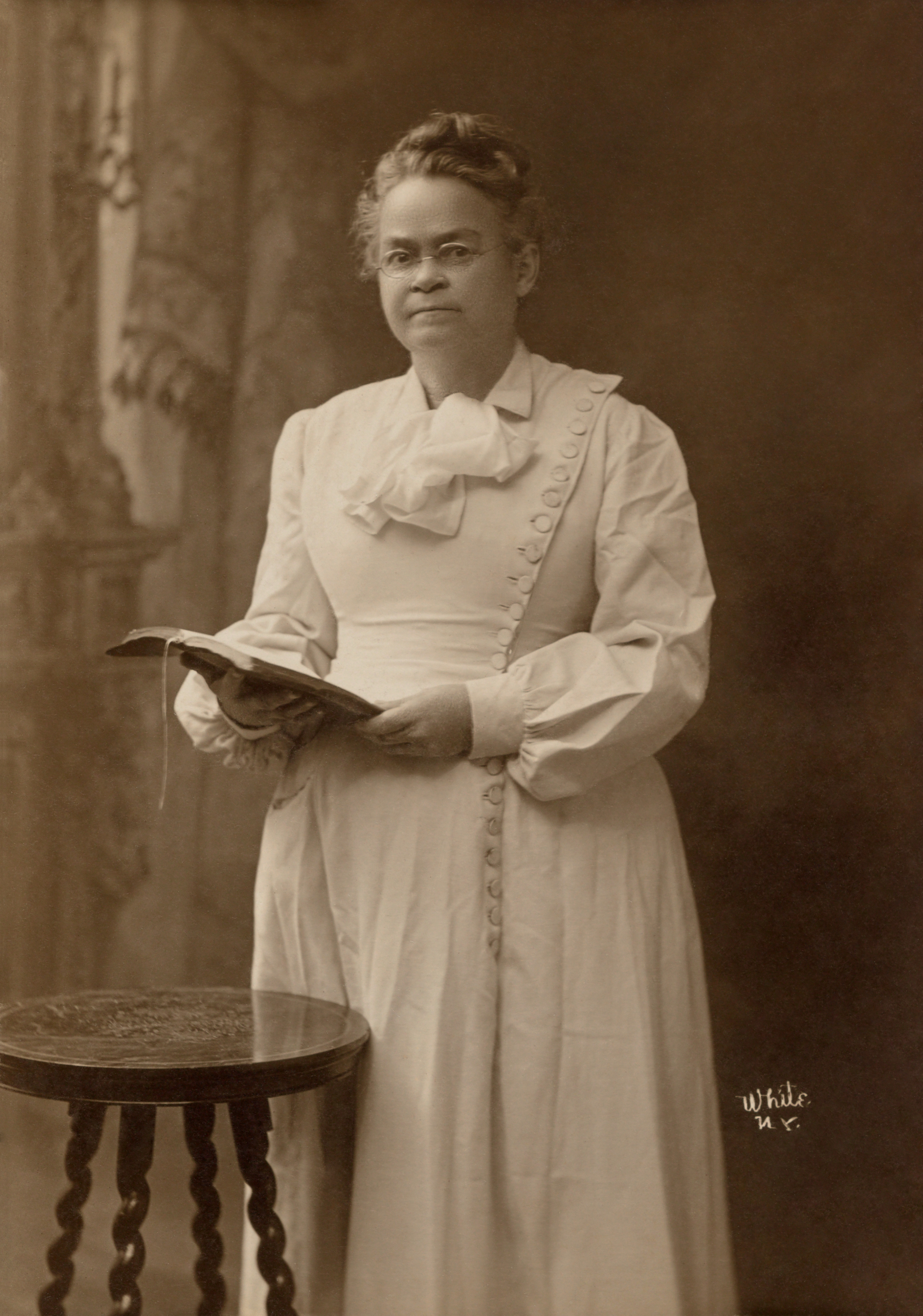
June 7, 1900: Carrie A. Nation destroys her first saloon

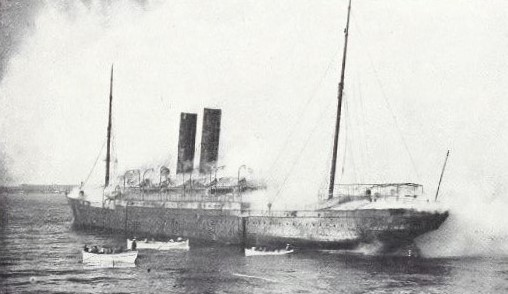
June 30, 1900: Hoboken docks fire kills 326 people on SS Saale and two other German steamships

The following events occurred in June 1900:

== June 1, 1900 (Friday) ==
- In South Africa, the city of Pretoria surrendered to British troops under Lord Roberts.
- Workers began the actual count for the 1900 United States census. In New York City, a force of 1,210 had two weeks to finish the count. The tally was eventually 76,212,168. The complete census forms would not be unsealed until December 3, 1973.

== June 2, 1900 (Saturday) ==
- Samori Ture, formerly Emperor of the Wassoulou Empire in West Africa, died at Ndjolé, an island in Gabon's Ogooué River where he was exiled by France after his 1898 defeat by commander Henri Gouraud. Associate Albert Baratier commented that Toure "would have compared to Napoleon, found his St. Helena".
- The French Senate voted an amnesty for Alfred Dreyfus who had been pardoned earlier (September 18, 1899) by President Émile Loubet. Not until July 19, 1906 was the verdict against Dreyfus set aside.

== June 3, 1900 (Sunday) ==
- William Howard Taft arrived in Manila on the USS Hancock as Governor-General of the Philippines, replacing General Arthur MacArthur, the last military governor. Taft would say later, "I cannot describe the coldness of the Army officers and the Army men who received us any better than by saying that it somewhat exceeded the coldness of the populace."
- The International Ladies Garment Workers Union (ILGWU) was founded in New York City.
- In Germany, the most comprehensive meat inspection laws in the world, to that time, took effect.
- The railroad line between Beijing and Tianjin was cut by Boxer rebels.
- Born: Gordon Sinclair, Canadian journalist, who had a Top Ten hit single in 1973 with his spoken-word recording "The Americans"; in Toronto (d. 1984)
- Died: Mary Kingsley, 37, English adventurer and ethnologist who had written two bestsellers about the various peoples of West Africa, died of typhoid fever in South Africa.

== June 4, 1900 (Monday) ==
- The Battle of Makahambus Hill took place near Cagayan de Oro in the Philippines. The event is commemorated in the Philippines as the first victory of the Filipino soldiers against the American occupation forces and a historical marker is on the site.
- Born: George Watkins, American baseball player who had a record .373 batting average in his rookie season; in Freestone County, Texas (d. 1970)

== June 5, 1900 (Tuesday) ==
- At 2:00 in the afternoon, Pretoria, capital of the South African Republic, surrendered to British General Lord Roberts.
- Born: Dennis Gabor, Hungarian physicist, inventor of holography and recipient of the Nobel Prize in Physics in 1971; in Budapest, Austria-Hungary (d. 1979)
- Died: Stephen Crane, 28, American writer, author of The Red Badge of Courage, died of tuberculosis in Badenweiler, Germany.

== June 6, 1900 (Wednesday) ==
- U.S. President William McKinley signed into law the federal charter for the American Red Cross.
- The United States Congress enacted a civil and judicial code for Alaska, setting the capital at Juneau and creating a territorial government.
- The United States Congress approved the 1892 Agreement with the Comanche, Kiowa and Apache, by which 4,500 square miles (12,000 km^{2}) of indigenous land in southwest Oklahoma had been purchased for a bargain price of 93 cents an acre for 29,000,000 acres. The act passed despite assertions by the affected tribes (the Kiowa, Comanche and Plains Apache) that the terms had been misrepresented and the agreement had not legally been ratified as required (under the Medicine Lodge Treaty of 1867) by 3/4 of the adult males of the tribe. A Kiowa chief named Lone Wolf brought suit in 1901 against the law, but the U.S. Supreme Court ruled against the Indians in the case of Lone Wolf v. Hitchcock, 187 U.S. 553 (1903). On July 4, 1900, President McKinley proclaimed the area open for settlement effective August 6, 1900. Since the mid-20th century, the government has paid tens of millions of dollars in compensation settlements to the three tribes because of their claims of being defrauded in these issues of the treaty and allotments.
- United States Congress funded the reinterment of 267 Southern soldiers from Northern grounds to a special section of the Arlington National Cemetery.
- Mr. Ryall, the Superintendent of Police in British East Africa (now Kenya), was eaten by a lion after being taken by a railcar where he was traveling with two other hunters. The lion jumped into the window of a railcar at Kima where Ryall was sleeping and dragged him off.
- Born: Arthur Askey, English comedian and actor; in Dingle, Liverpool (d. 1982)

== June 7, 1900 (Thursday) ==
- Carrie Nation started her crusade against liquor. Walking into a saloon in Kiowa, Kansas at 8:30am, she told owner John Dobson, "I don't want to strike you, but I am going to break up this den of vice." She then smashed his liquor bottles and the mirror behind the bar, vandalized three other bars in Kiowa and rode out of town. Because the saloons were operating illegally, she was not arrested. Nation continued her destruction until her death in 1911.
- Born:
  - Glen Gray, American jazz musician, saxophonist and band leader for the Casa Loma Orchestra; as Glen Gray Knoblauch in Metamora, Illinois (d. 1963)
  - Frederick Terman, American academic, credited as the "Father of Silicon Valley"; in English, Indiana (d. 1982)

== June 8, 1900 (Friday) ==
- In Beijing, Boxer rebels burned the grandstand of the horse racing track at the country club for western diplomats. Three British students who rode out to investigate the fire were charged by a crowd of the Chinese and retreated. One of the British horsemen, however, drew his pistol and killed one of the Chinese men. In response, the Imperial government sent armies to surround the foreigners at the Peking Legation Quarter.
- The telescopic sight was approved for mass production, following the report of a special "Board of Officers on Test of Telescopic Sight for U.S. Magazine Rifle", issued to the United States Department of War. On May 24, the Board reported that the scope made by the Cataract Tool and Optical Company had proved accurate even at a range of 2,000 yards—more than a mile.

== June 9, 1900 (Saturday) ==
- In Beijing, Imperial Chinese troops surrounded the legation quarter where the diplomatic corps from western powers and Japan were headquartered. British minister Sir Claude Maxwell MacDonald telegraphed: "Situation extremely grave. Unless arrangements are made for immediate advance to Peking, it will be too late."

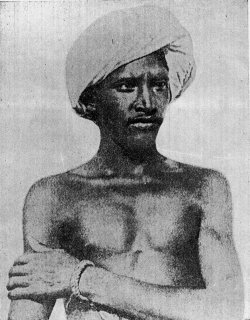
Birsa Munda

- Birsa Munda, the 24-year-old rebel who led the Munda rebellion in British India's Bihar region, died in prison in Ranchi under mysterious circumstances, becoming one of the martyred heroes of the Indian independence movement. In his memory are named the Birsa Agricultural University and the Birsa Munda Airport, both in Ranchi, and the Birsa Institute of Technology at Sindri.
- Patrolman William "Mox" McQuery of the Covington, Kentucky Police Department, a former Major League Baseball player, was shot in the chest while trying to arrest two murder suspects at the base of the Cincinnati–Covington Bridge. McQuery would die of his wounds on June 12.

== June 10, 1900 (Sunday) ==
- In response to the Boxer Rebellion, a multinational force of more than 2,000 foreign troops set off by train from Tien-tsin (Tianjin) for Peking (Beijing) to protect the citizens of their respective countries. The trains, carrying troops from the United Kingdom, the United States, France, Germany, Italy, Russia and Japan, halted at Langfang, not far into the 110-mile (180 km) trip, because the rails had been destroyed and had to march the rest of the way.
- In the 1960 film The Time Machine, the traveler stops at this date before proceeding onward to the year 802,701.

== June 11, 1900 (Monday) ==
- In Beijing, violence against foreigners took a new turn when Japanese diplomat Sugiyama Akira was murdered by Imperial Chinese soldiers. Akira, the chancellor of the Japanese legation, had dressed in "top hat and tails" and driven by carriage from the legation quarter to the train station where he had planned to greet the relief force arriving from Tianjin, but the rails had been destroyed by the Boxers. Imperial soldiers under the command of General Tung dragged Akira from his carriage and hacked him to bits, then displayed his severed head at the station.
- Belle Boyd, American writer who spied for the Confederacy during the American Civil War and later recounted her experiences to audiences, died of a heart attack while touring Wisconsin.

== June 12, 1900 (Tuesday) ==
- By a vote of 201–103, the Reichstag approved the expansion of the Imperial German Navy, doubling the number of ships to 96 in all.
- In Chicago, hundreds of spectators at a circus were thrown to the ground when the seating collapsed, just as the performance began. Fourteen people were hospitalized. A week earlier, twelve people had been hurt in a collapse of seats at the same circus.
- Born: Robert Brode, American physicist who headed the design team to develop the proximity fuze for the two U.S. atomic bombs used in World War II on Hiroshima and Nagasaki in 1945; in Walla Walla, Washington (d. 1986)
- Died: Mox McQuery, 38, Major League Baseball first baseman and police officer, died three days after he was shot in the line of duty on June 9.

== June 13, 1900 (Wednesday) ==
- When three Chinese Boxers came too close to the German legation, one of them, a young man, was captured by the German guards. Baron von Ketteler, the German minister thrashed the Boxer with his cane, ordered his guards to extend the beating and warned the Chinese Foreign Ministry (the Zongli Yamen) that the boy would die. Over the next few days, the foreign diplomats began shooting at Chinese nationals near the Peking Legation Quarter. Von Ketteler himself would be killed on June 20. The same day, communication between the foreign embassies and the rest of the world was halted as their telegraph lines were severed.

== June 14, 1900 (Thursday) ==
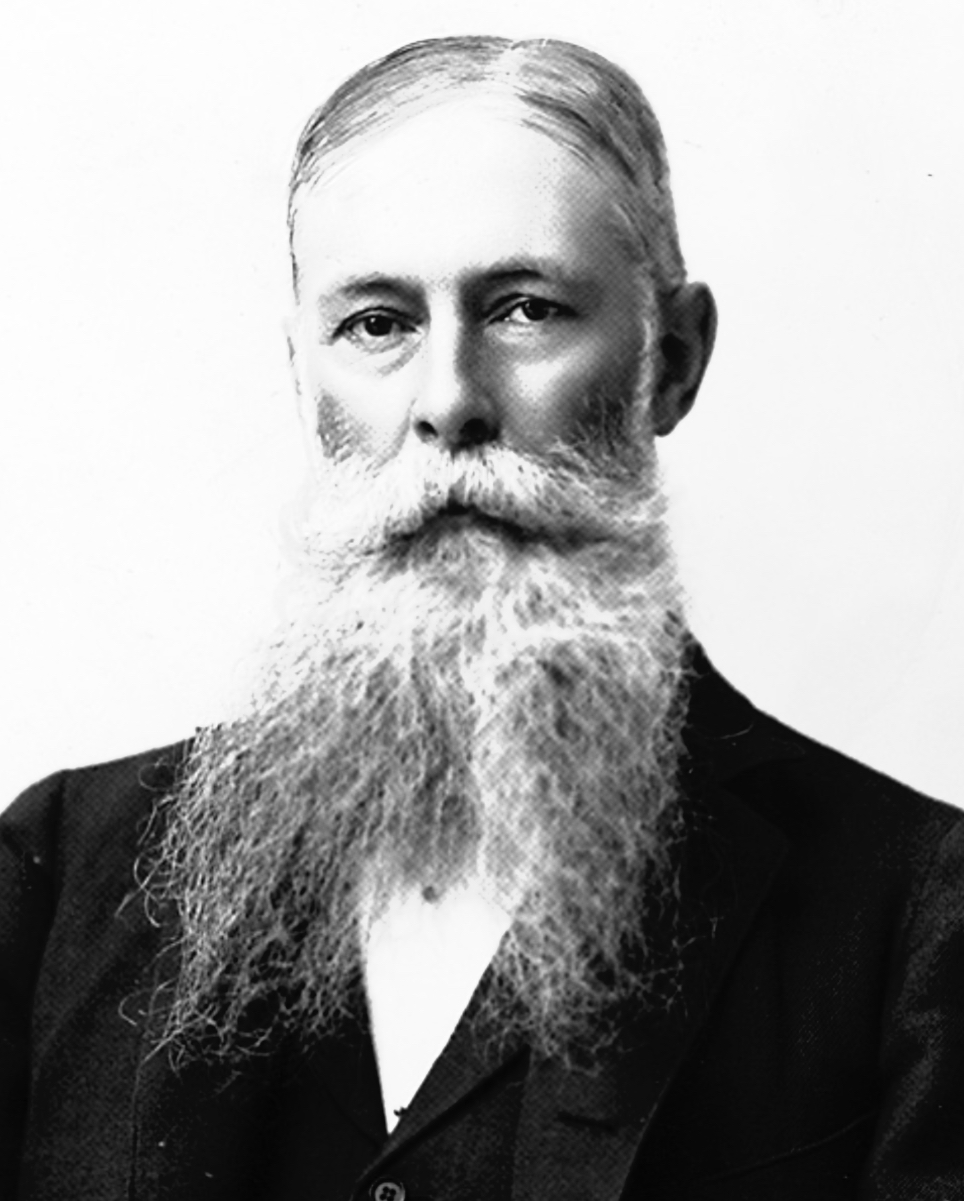
President and Governor Dole

- The Republic of Hawaii formally came to an end as the "Act to Provide a Government for the Territory of Hawaii" took effect. Sanford B. Dole who had continued as president even after sovereignty was transferred to the United States in 1898, became the first territorial Governor. All persons who were citizens of the Republic as of August 12, 1898, became U.S. citizens.
- At 7pm, German embassy guards, under the direction of Ambassador Baron von Ketteler, fired on Boxer rebels outside the legation quarter, killing 20. Lancelot Giles of the British embassy, recorded the incident in his diary that night, noting the furious shouts from a crowd trying to get into the city. G.E. Morrison, correspondent for the London Times, noted another incident where 45 Chinese were killed in a raid by the Europeans on a temple.
- The first Bennett Cup auto race, for a prize sponsored by New York Herald publisher James Gordon Bennett Jr., began as five entrants departed from the Parc de Saint-Cloud, near Paris, on a 566 kilometer (352 miles) trip to Lyon. Departing at two minute intervals starting at 3:14 in the morning, the competitors passed through Châteaudun, Orléans, Gien, Nevers, Moulins and Roanne. Only two drivers (winner Fernand Charron and runner-up Léonce Girardot) would finish the race.

== June 15, 1900 (Friday) ==
- Chinese Empress (Tzu Hsi) Cixi decreed that Boxer rebels could not enter Beijing, in response to fighting between the European legations and the rebels who continued to pour into the capital.
- Born: Paul Mares, American jazz musician, trumpeter and band leader of New Orleans Rhythm Kings; in New Orleans (d. 1949)

== June 16, 1900 (Saturday) ==
- In Lübeck, Germany, the Elbe–Lübeck Canal, 41 miles (66 km) in length, was formally opened by Kaiser Wilhelm. The canal took five years to build at a cost of nearly six million dollars at the time and joined the Elbe River to the Trave which in turn provided ocean access at the Baltic Sea.
- An accident at the Slough railway station led to the 1906 introduction of a system of automatic train control.
- Local elections were held in Cuba under the auspices of the U.S. military government with a system of restricted suffrage. 7% of the Cuban population took part in the polls which saw some important victories for pro-independence sectors.

== June 17, 1900 (Sunday) ==
- At 3:25pm, the ships from the Eight-Nation Alliance started bombardment of the Taku Forts in China and began an invasion. An ultimatum, sent the night before, had expired at 2:00. Ninety minutes into the battle, ammunition magazines inside the forts were destroyed and the defenders surrendered the next day.
- In Philadelphia, delegates to the upcoming Republican Convention weighed in on the choice for U.S. President William McKinley's running mate to replace the late vice-president Garret Hobart. U.S. Senator Boies Penrose of Pennsylvania announced that 58 of his state's 64 delegates supported New York Governor Theodore Roosevelt. Colorado followed and soon more states were supporting Roosevelt.
- Born: Martin Bormann, German state official, chief of the Nazi Party Chancellery of Germany from 1941 to 1945; in Wegeleben, Prussia (killed 1945)

== June 18, 1900 (Monday) ==
- The Taku Forts of China surrendered at 8am, 16 hours after Western navies had begun bombardment. More than 1,000 Chinese defenders were killed or wounded, while the allies lost 184 men. The Russian ship Gilyakwas sunk. The four destroyers of the Chinese Navy, anchored at the Peiho river, were captured and recommissioned as naval vessels in the United Kingdom, France, Germany and Russia. The Hai Lung became the British HMS Taku, the Hai Hse became the French ship Takou, the Hai Jing became the German ship Taku and the Hai Hua was later the Russian ship Lieutenant Burakov.

== June 19, 1900 (Tuesday) ==
- In Beijing, on the 23rd day of the fifth moon, an ultimatum was delivered to the eleven ambassadors in the legation quarter. Because of the attack on the Taku Forts, all foreign residents (including diplomats, missionaries and their families) were given until 4pm the next day to leave the Chinese capital. The directive to Mr. Conger stated, "The princes and ministers ... beg that within twenty-four hours the minister of the United States, with his family ... and taking his guards, keeping them under control, will leave for Tientsin, in order to avoid danger. An escort of troops has been dispatched to give protection en route and the local officials have been also notified to allow the minister's party to pass."

== June 20, 1900 (Wednesday) ==
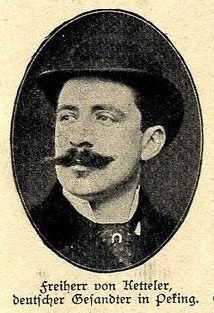
Baron von Ketteler

- Clemens von Ketteler, the German ambassador to China, was murdered as he and an aide went to the Chinese Foreign Ministry (Zongli Yamen) without their guards. With seven hours left until a 4pm deadline for all foreigners to leave Beijing, Baron von Ketteler defied his fellow ambassadors and left the safety of the diplomatic quarter. He was shot and killed (by a Boxer later identified as En Hai) as he approached the Zongli Yamen. His interpreter, Heinrich Cordes, survived to return to the embassy, at which point evacuation was no longer an option. American ambassador Conger would later report that he had learned "that Prince Tuan had planned to have his soldiers massacre all the foreign ministers at the Tsungli Yamen on June 20. But ... the impatient soldiers prematurely attacked and killed Baron von Kettler ... we were not invited to the Tsungli Yamen and so were saved." At 4pm, Chinese troops began their siege of the Peking Legation Quarter where 900 foreigners, 523 defenders and 3,000 Chinese Christians held out behind the walls. The siege would last 55 days.

== June 21, 1900 (Thursday) ==
- China formally declared war on the United States, the United Kingdom, Germany, France and Japan, as an edict issued from Empress Dowager Cixi.
- Baron Eduard von Toll, leader of the Russian Polar Expedition of 1900, departed Saint Petersburg in Russia on the explorer ship Zarya, never to return. On November 8, 1902, as his third Winter away was beginning, Toll and four others set off from Bennett Island and were never seen again.
- Major General Arthur MacArthur, commander of U.S. forces in the Philippines, offered amnesty for 90 days to all guerillas. Only 5,022 Filipinos accepted, mostly prisoners.
- At the Republican Convention, William McKinley and New York Governor Theodore Roosevelt were unanimously nominated for president and vice-president.

== June 22, 1900 (Friday) ==
- In Dunhuang, Gansu, China, a Daoist monk named Wang Yuanlu rediscovered an entire library of the centuries-old Dunhuang manuscripts. The newest of the materials dated from the 11th century, the oldest from the 5th.

== June 23, 1900 (Saturday) ==
- The day after the discovery of one ancient Chinese library, another was destroyed by fire. The Hanlin Academy library in Beijing was adjacent to the British Legation and was China's largest collection of works, housing thousands of centuries-old publications. Soldiers under the command of General Chang Foo Shiang set fire to the academy while attacking the British embassy; the library burned to the ground, but the winds blew the flames away from the embassy which survived unscathed.
- Foreigners at Tianjin were rescued by the Allied invasion force, led by Major Littleton Waller and a detachment of U.S. Marines, followed by German, British, Japanese and Italian forces. Future American President Herbert Hoover, a 26-year-old engineer, was among those saved.

== June 24, 1900 (Sunday) ==
- Boxer rebels attacked the Wangla village in the Hebei province of China, burning down its Catholic church and killing all Christian converts except for four orphan girls. Given the chance to have their lives spared in return for renouncing their faith, the four girls, Lucy Wan Cheng (18), Mary Fan Kun (16), Mary Chi Yu (15) and Mary Zheng Xu (11) refused and were murdered. The girls would be among 85 Martyr Saints of China canonized by Pope John Paul II on October 1, 2000.
- On the night of June 24–25 [Old Calendar 11–12], Boxer rebels with burning torches appeared in all parts of Beijing, attacking Christian dwellings, seizing unfortunate Christians torturing them and forcing them to renounce Christ. Stomachs were ripped open, heads severed and dwellings burnt. After the destruction of Christian dwellings, Orthodox Christians were taken outside the city gates to the pagans' idols, interrogated and burnt on fires. Pagan eyewitnesses testified that some of the Orthodox met death with astonishing self-sacrifice. The Orthodox catechist Paul Wang died a martyr's death with a prayer on his lips. The Mission school teacher Ia Wen was tortured twice. The first time, the Boxer rebels chopped her up and covered her half-dead body with earth. When she regained consciousness, her groans were heard by the (pagan) watchman who took her to his guard's booth. But after a while, the Boxer rebels seized her again and this time tortured her to death. In both cases Ia Wen joyfully professed Christ before her torturers."
- Born: Gene Austin, American singer; as Lemuel Eugene Lucas in Gainesville, Texas (d. 1972)

== June 25, 1900 (Monday) ==
- The Yellow Fever Board, chaired by Dr. Walter Reed with board members Dr. Jesse Lazear, Dr. James Carroll and Dr. Aristides Agramonte, began working on the task of ending the disease of yellow fever which had killed hundreds of thousands in the Western Hemisphere. Dr. Lazear would die of the disease, but made the critical discovery that yellow fever could be ended by eradicating the mosquitoes that spread it. In 1900, 1,000 people in Havana died from yellow fever while in 1901, only twenty did.
- Born: Lord Montbatten, British noble and the last Governor-General of India; in Windsor, Berkshire, England (killed by terrorists, 1979)

== June 26, 1900 (Tuesday) ==
- The Russification of Finland took a new direction when an Imperial ukase was issued from Tsar Nicholas, replacing Finnish with Russian as the official language to be phased in over five years.
- In British India, Resolution No. 585 went into effect, requiring that "except in a purely English office", no person would be appointed to a government job "unless he knows both Hindi and Urdu" and that incumbent officials would have one year to learn both languages.

== June 27, 1900 (Wednesday) ==
- France and Spain agreed on a boundary between their West African colonies, Mauritania and the Spanish Sahara. The treaty was ratified on March 22, 1901. Mauritania became independent in 1960 and after it gave up claims to the Spanish colony, it now shares the border with Morocco.

== June 28, 1900 (Thursday) ==
- In Vienna, Archduke Franz Ferdinand, heir to the Austrian and Hungarian thrones, renounced the right of succession of his future offspring in order to marry Countess Sophie Chotek von Chotkova. The Archduke swore an oath of a morganatic marriage before Foreign Minister Agenor Goluchowski. The marriage took place the following Sunday. Exactly 14 years after his oath regarding the status of his marriage, the Archduke and his wife would be assassinated, leading to an international crisis that would escalate into World War I.

== June 29, 1900 (Friday) ==
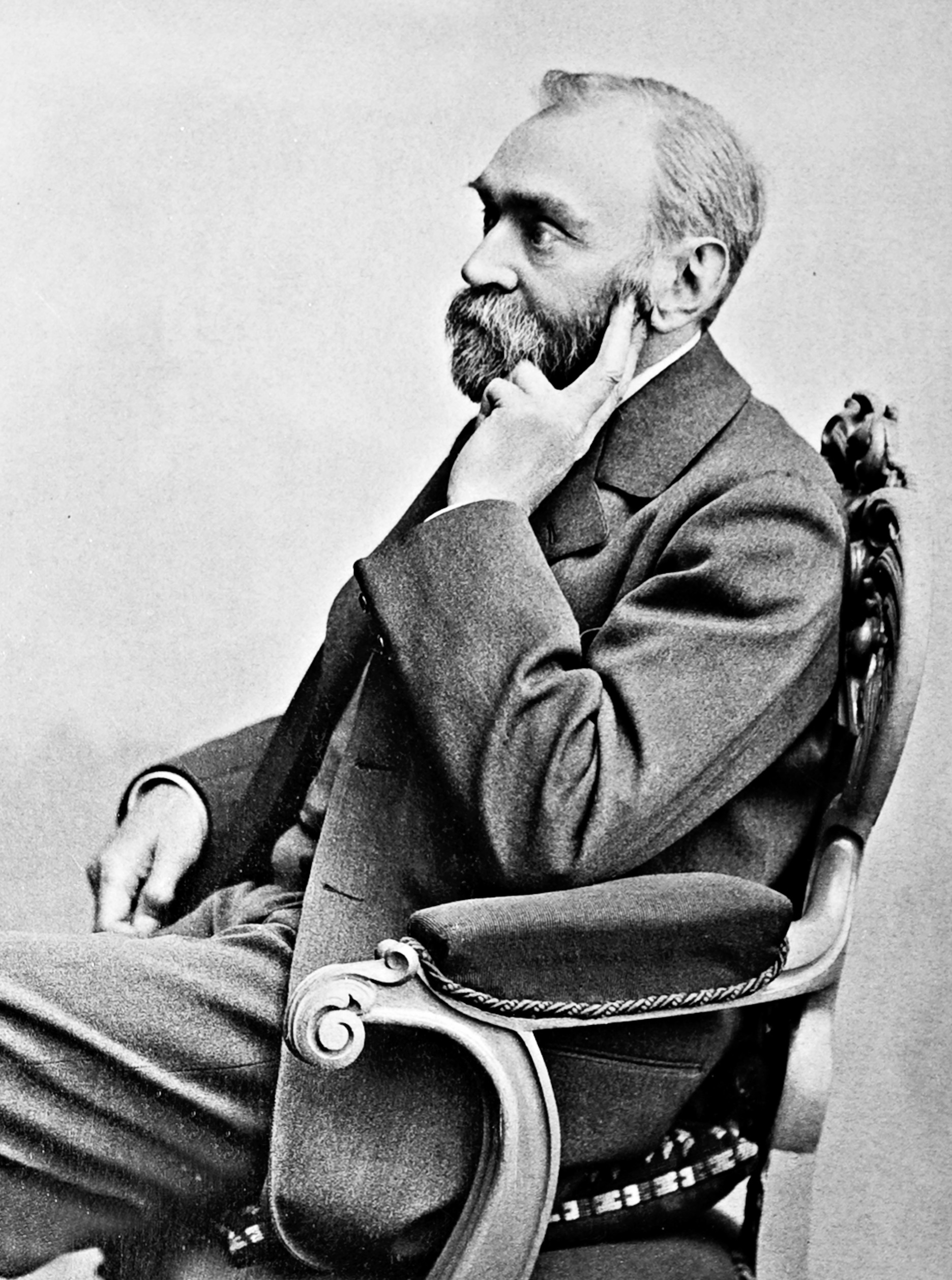
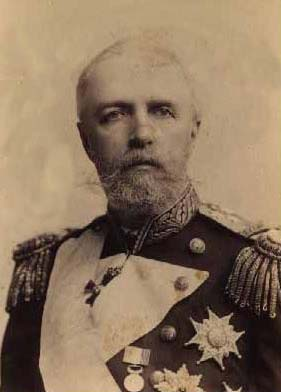
Alfred Nobel and King Oscar II of Sweden
- King Oscar of Sweden approved the creation of the Nobel Foundation, funded by the 1895 will of Alfred Nobel. The first Nobel Prize awards were made by the foundation in 1901.
- Within the British-controlled Protectorate of Uganda, the Uganda Agreement was ratified by the Kingdom of Toro and its King, the Omukama Kyebambe. The pact outlined Toro's boundaries within southwest Uganda and defined British jurisdiction over its relations with the other kingdoms.
- Born: Antoine de Saint-Exupéry, French writer and aircraft pilot, author of the classic children's book The Little Prince; in Lyon (d. 1944)

== June 30, 1900 (Saturday) ==
- A fire that killed 326 people started at Pier 8 in Hoboken, New Jersey when cotton bales and barrels of turpentine and oil began burning at around 4 o'clock in the afternoon. In less than 15 minutes, high winds spread the blaze a quarter of a mile along the port and on to the four German steamships moored there. The steamers Saale and Main, each with 150 crew on board, were destroyed and Bremen was heavily damaged. On the Saale, the portholes were too narrow for the men inside to escape and most on board burned to death. The huge liner SS Kaiser Wilhelm der Grosse was saved by being towed into the Hudson River. Despite the best efforts of the Hoboken and New York fire departments to save the piers and the ships, respectively, 326 people were killed.
