= HMS Taku =

Two vessels of the Royal Navy have borne the name HMS Taku after the Taku forts in China.

- HMS Taku (1900) was a captured destroyer. Originally built by Schichau at Elbing for the Chinese Navy in 1898, she displaced 305 tons, had a speed of 32 knots (59 km/h), and was armed with six 3-pounder guns and two 14 in (356 mm) torpedo tubes and had 58 crew. She was one of four captured from the Chinese during the Boxer Rebellion in 1900. The four ships were shared between the navies of the UK, France, Imperial Germany and Imperial Russia and until the Russian one was renamed Lieutenant Burakov each was named Taku (see French Takou, German Taku, Russian Taku). She was 194 feet long and her 6,000 hp (4,474 kW) produced 32 knots courtesy of her Schichau boilers. The British Taku was sold in Hong Kong in 1916.
- HMS Taku (N38) was a T-class submarine built by Cammell Laird and launched in 1939. She served in Second World War and was sold in 1946.
