= Russian destroyer Leytenant Burakov =

Leytenant Burakov, also spelled Lieutenant Burakov, can refer to the following destroyers of the Imperial Russian Navy:

- Russian destroyer Leytenant Burakov (1900), a Hai Lung-class destroyer captured in 1900 and sunk in 1904
- Russian destroyer Leytenant Burakov (1905), a Leytenant Burakov-class destroyer launched in 1905 and sunk in 1917
