= Hai Lung-class destroyer =

Four torpedo boat destroyers

- HMS Taku, formally Hai Lung, off Hong Kong on Christmas Day 1900

Class overview
- Name: Hai Lung class
- Builders: Schichau-Werke
- Operators: Imperial Chinese Navy; Royal Navy; Imperial German Navy; Imperial Russian Navy; French Navy
- In service: 1899–1916
- Completed: 4
- Lost: 3
- Scrapped: 1

General characteristics
- Type: Torpedo boat destroyer
- Displacement: Normal: 280 long tons (284 t); Full load: 305 long tons (310 t)
- Length: 193 ft 6 in (58.98 m)
- Beam: 20 ft 0 in (6.10 m)
- Draft: 6 ft 6 in (1.98 m)
- Installed power: 6,000 ihp (4,500 kW)
- Propulsion: 2 × engines; 4 × boilers; 2 × propellers
- Speed: 32 knots (59 km/h; 37 mph)
- Armament: 6 × 3-pounder guns; 2 × 18 in (457 mm) torpedo tubes

The Hai Lung class was a series of four torpedo boat destroyers ordered by the Imperial Chinese Navy in 1896 to recover from the First Sino-Japanese War. Delivered in 1899, the four destroyers were captured by a Royal Navy detachment during the Battle of the Taku Forts, 17 June 1900, in the Boxer Rebellion. The ships were distributed among Eight-Nation Alliance navies involved in the battle, with one destroyer each going to the British, German, French, and Russian navies. Each ship was renamed either Taku or Takou, and they are sometimes referred to as the Taku-class destroyers.

The Russian Taku was renamed Leytenant Burakov and was torpedoed during the Russian-Japanese War and sunk in 1904. The French Takou ran aground in 1911 and was condemned, the German Taku was scuttled during World War I in the Siege of Tsingtao, and the British Taku was decommissioned in 1916.

== Design and development ==
During the First Sino-Japanese War, the Beiyang Fleet of the Qing dynasty suffered heavy losses and was unable to resist Japanese offensives. All but one ship were destroyed, and the Dynasty began to rebuild the fleet by purchasing ships abroad in 1894 despite a lack of funds. In 1896, four torpedo boat destroyers were ordered from the Schichau-Werke shipyard in Germany. The Hai Lung-class destroyers—Hai Lung, Hai Hua, Hai Jing, and Hai Hse—had a length between perpendiculars of 193 feet 6 inches (58.98 m), a beam of 20 feet 0 inches (6.10 m), and a draught of 6 feet 6 inches (1.98 m). They displaced 280 long tons (284 t) at normal load and 305 long tons (310 t) at full load, and carried a complement of either 50 or 57. Propulsion was provided by two propellers powered by two triple-expansion steam engines supplied by four Schichau-Thornycroft water-tube boilers, which developed 6,000 indicated horsepower (4,500 kW) and gave the ships a designed top speed of 32 knots (59 km/h; 37 mph). The destroyers carried approximately 67 long tons (68 t) of coal that enabled a range of 3,000 miles (4,800 km) at a cruising speed of 12 knots (22 km/h; 14 mph). Armament consisted of six 3-pounder guns mounted on the broadside on the bow, midship, and stern along with two single 18 in (457 mm) torpedo tubes mounted in front and behind the second funnel. The designs also featured a ram, turtledeck bow, two slender funnels, a lightly constructed hull made of galvanized steel subdivided into nine watertight compartments, a yawl, and a dinghy.

== Service history ==
=== Chinese service ===
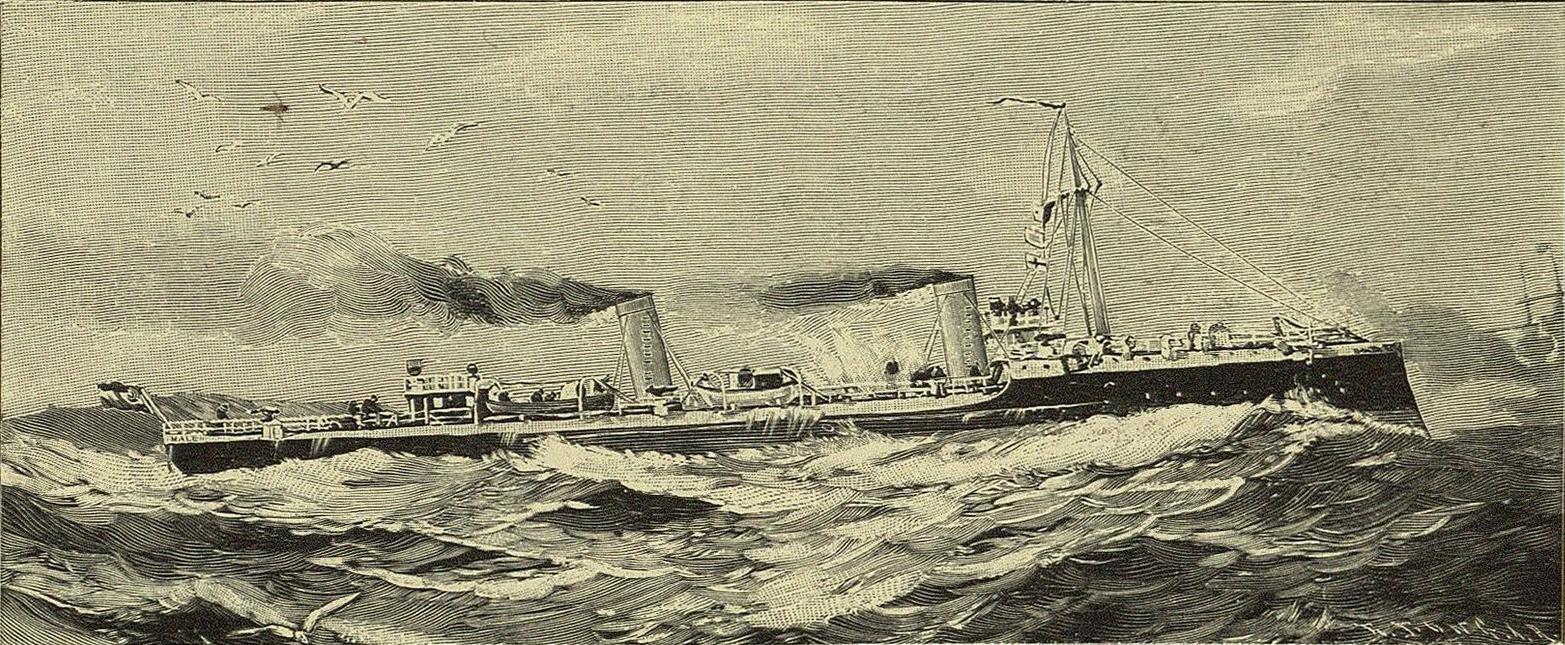
German advertisement from 1900 depicting one of the destroyers at high speed

Progress on the destroyers was slow, but they were finished and launched in late 1898. Because it was winter, delivery of the destroyers was delayed until 1899. Once in China, the ships were assigned to the rebuilt Beiyang Fleet off Taku. During the Boxer Rebellion, the four ships were moored at the Taku Dockyards when an Eight-Nation Alliance fleet arrived to relieve Peking and crush the rebellion. The allied fleet was ordered to attack enemy forces that directly opposed then and saw the torpedo boats prepare to get underway. Unbeknownst to them, the Chinese destroyers were undergoing repair and received orders to withdraw and avoid conflict. In the opening stage of the Battle of the Taku Forts on 17 June 1900, British destroyers HMS Fame and HMS Whiting led by Roger Keyes were dispatched to seize the ships. At two in the morning, each destroyer towed a whaleboat, both loaded with 13 men, down the Peiho River. The four British vessels each targeted one of the destroyers as they pulled alongside. After a brief engagement, the Chinese crew was routed and the four destroyers were captured. British Admiral Edward Seymour ordered one of the destroyers be kept within the Royal Navy, and the remaining three given to the French, German, and Russian Navies, as they fought with the British during the battle. The ships were all renamed Taku (spelled Takou in French), and as a result are sometimes referred to as the Taku-class destroyers.

=== Foreign service ===
==== Royal Navy ====
Hai Lung was commissioned into the Royal Navy as HMS Taku and towed by HMS Fame to Hong Kong. The British were concerned that German-built destroyers had a top speed as high as 35 knots (65 km/h; 40 mph), but discovered the light and weak construction of Taku limited her practicality and was inferior to British designs. As a result, she was used as a tender ship at the Royal Navy's base in Hong Kong. The destroyer was sold off on 25 October 1916 at Hong Kong and scrapped.

==== Imperial German Navy ====
Hai Jing (also spelled Hai Ching) was given to the Imperial German Navy, renamed Taku, and entered service on 6 December 1900. Under German service, she was based out of Tsingtao and assigned to the East Asia Squadron and made various voyages along the Yangtze River. In 1901, her crew was reassigned to the newly commissioned gunboat SMS Vorwärts and on 13 June 1914, she was decommissioned as a result of worn-out boilers due to her voyages in the Yangtze. At the outbreak of World War I, she was recommissioned and manned by crew from several river gunboats, but the resulting voyage exposed severe issues regarding her boilers and condensers. To prevent her capture by Japanese forces during the Siege of Tsingtao, Taku and several other vessels were rigged with explosives and scuttled in the bay on 28 September 1914. The wreck rests between 50 and 60 m (160 and 200 ft) under the water.

==== French Navy ====
Hai Hse was given to the French Navy, renamed Takou, and commissioned on 20 June 1900. The French found her to be lightly built, lie low in the water, and bounce between the waves. Light pitching caused the propellers to briefly emerge and the ship was never able to reach her top speed. She operated as a division boat for the torpedo boat squadron assigned to Saigon. On 22 February 1911, she ran aground off Poulo Condor Island. The ship was salvaged on 27 April but was in such a poor condition that she was instead condemned on 30 September and disposed of.

==== Imperial Russian Navy ====
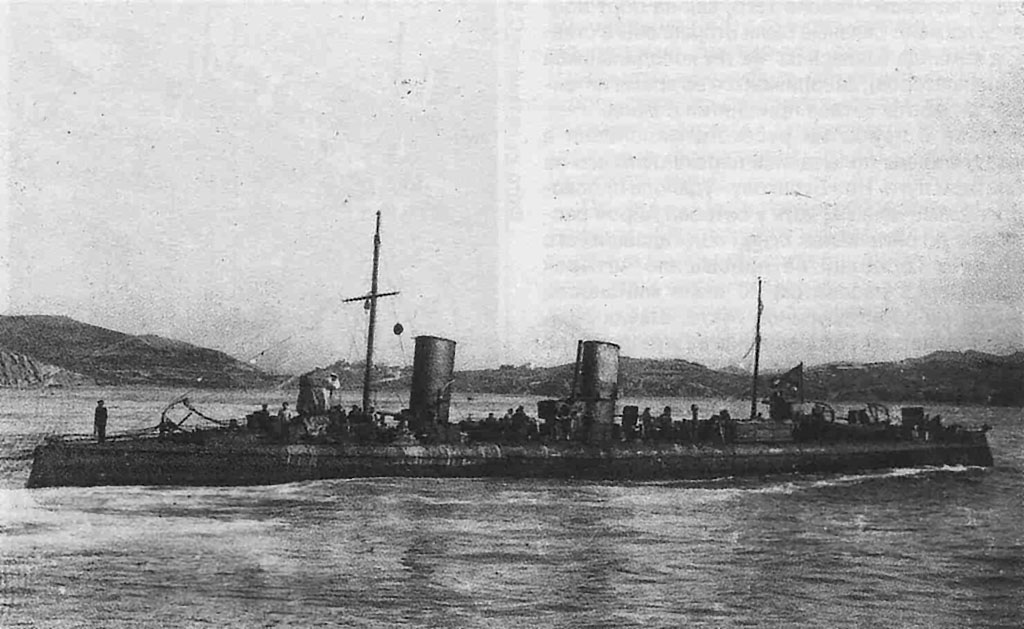
Leytenant Burakov, formally Hai Hua, in 1904

Hai Hua was given to the Imperial Russian Navy and was renamed Taku when she was handed over from the Royal Navy. On 27 January 1901, the destroyer was renamed Leytenant Burakov (Lieutenant Burakov) in honour of a gunnery officer killed onboard the Russian gunboat Koreetz during the battle. The destroyer was commissioned on 9 February and assigned to the Siberian Flotilla. During the Russian-Japanese War, Leytenant Burakov was assigned to the Port Arthur Squadron. As the fastest ship in the squadron, she was used as a dispatch vessel to run the Japanese blockade and maintain communication with other Russian forces. On 24 July, the destroyer was anchored off Tahe, East of Port Arthur, serving as a picket. In the early morning, Japanese battleships Mikasa and Fuji deployed one launch each to attack the anchored ships. At 2:32 am, one of the boats shot a torpedo at Leytenant Burakov, which struck her engine room on the port side. Another Russian destroyer, Grozovoi, attempted to tow the crippled Leytenant Burakov into shallow water in an attempt to save the ship. Two days after the attack, Leytenant Burakov broke in two and sank in the bay.

== Ships in class ==
Built as	Builder	Launched	Renamed	Fate
Hai Lung	Schichau-Werke	1898	Taku, Royal Navy	Scrapped, 1916
Hai Jing	Schichau-Werke	1898	Taku, Imperial German Navy	Scuttled, 28 September 1914
Hai Hse	Schichau-Werke	1898	Takou, French Navy	Ran aground, 22 February 1911
Hai Hua	Schichau-Werke	1898	Taku, Imperial Russian Navy	Torpedoed, 24 July 1904
