= SMS S90 =

Torpedo boat of the Imperial German Navy

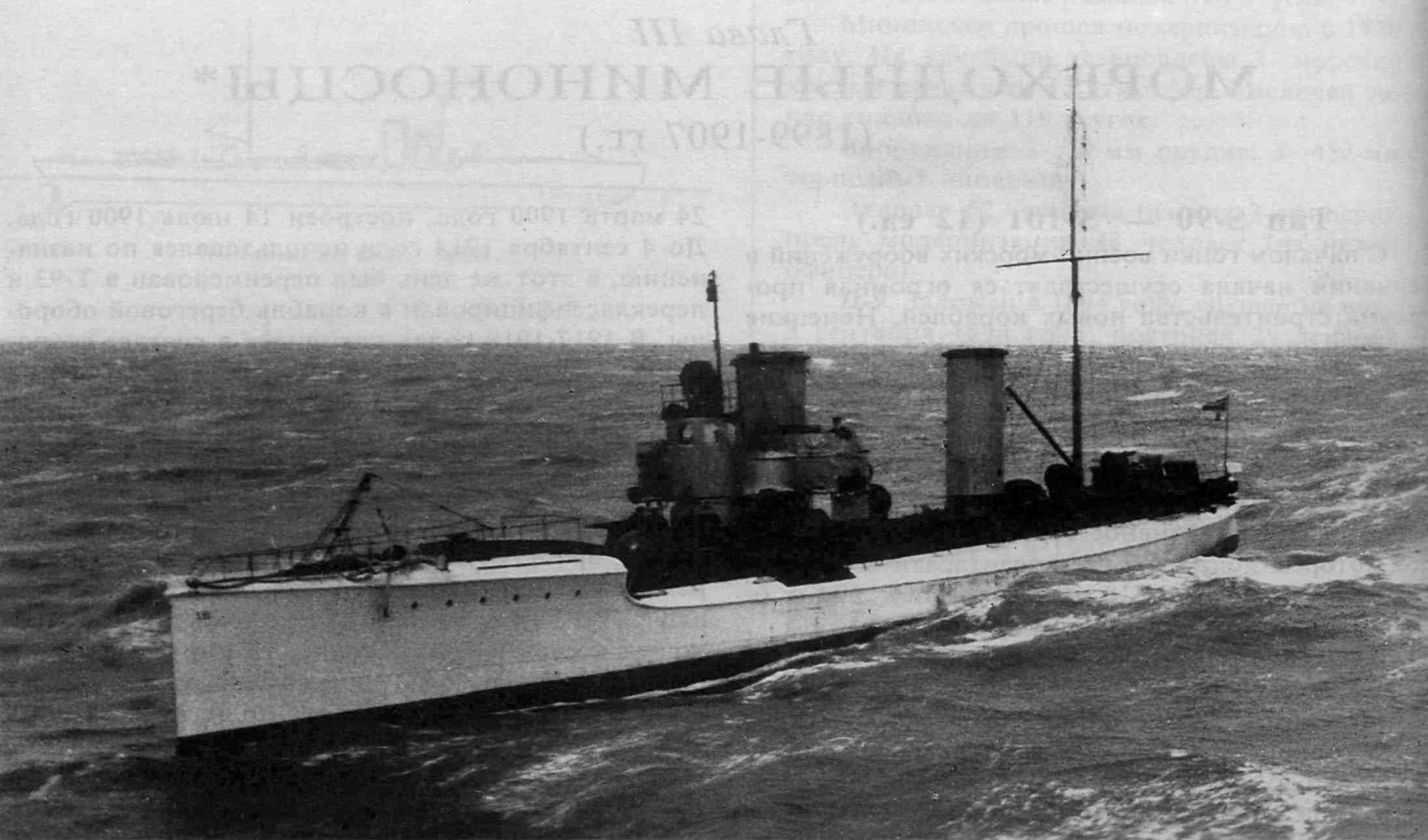

History

German Empire
- Name: SMS S90
- Builder: Schichau-Werke, Elbing
- Launched: 26 July 1899
- Completed: 24 October 1899
- Fate: Ran aground and wrecked 17 October 1914

General characteristics
- Class & type: S90-class torpedo boat
- Displacement: 388 t (382 long tons) design
- Length: 63.0 m (206 ft 8 in) o/a
- Beam: 7.0 m (23 ft 0 in)
- Draught: 2.23 m (7 ft 4 in)
- Installed power: 5,900 PS (5,800 ihp; 4,300 kW)
- Propulsion: 3 × boilers; 2 × Triple expansion steam engines
- Speed: 26.5 kn (30.5 mph; 49.1 km/h)
- Armament: 3× 5.0 cm guns; 3× 45 cm torpedo tubes

SMS S90 (Note: "SMS" stands for "Seiner Majestät Schiff" (transl. His Majesty's Ship)) (Note: The "S" in S90 denoted the shipbuilder who constructed her, in this case Schichau.) was a torpedo-boat of the Imperial German Navy. She was built by Schichau at Elbing as the lead ship of her class, completing in 1899.

At the start of the First World War, S90 was based at the German colony at Qingdao, China. At the Siege of Qingdao in October 1914 she sank the Japanese cruiser Takachiho and then was deliberately run aground on 17 October 1914.

== Design and construction ==
From the mid 1880s, the Imperial German Navy built up a large force of torpedo boats, while building a few larger "Division Boats" to lead the torpedo boat flotillas. From 1898, work began on a new class of larger torpedo boats, the S90-class torpedo boat. These ships, known as Große Torpedoboote or Hochsee Torpedoboote (large torpedo boats or high-seas torpedo boats) were large enough to carry the extra crew needed to act as flotilla leaders, eliminating the need to build separate Division boats, but, although they were of similar size to contemporary foreign torpedo-boat destroyers, they were still principally intended for torpedo attack, and only carried a light gun armament.

An initial group of 12 of the new large torpedo boats (S90–S101) were built by the Schichau-Werke shipyard at Elbing in East Prussia, Germany's principal builder of torpedo boats from 1898 to 1901, and this was followed by successive orders for similar ships, of gradually evolving design until 1907.

S90, the lead ship of the class, was laid down in 1898 as yard number 644, was launched on 26 July 1899 and completed on 24 October 1899.

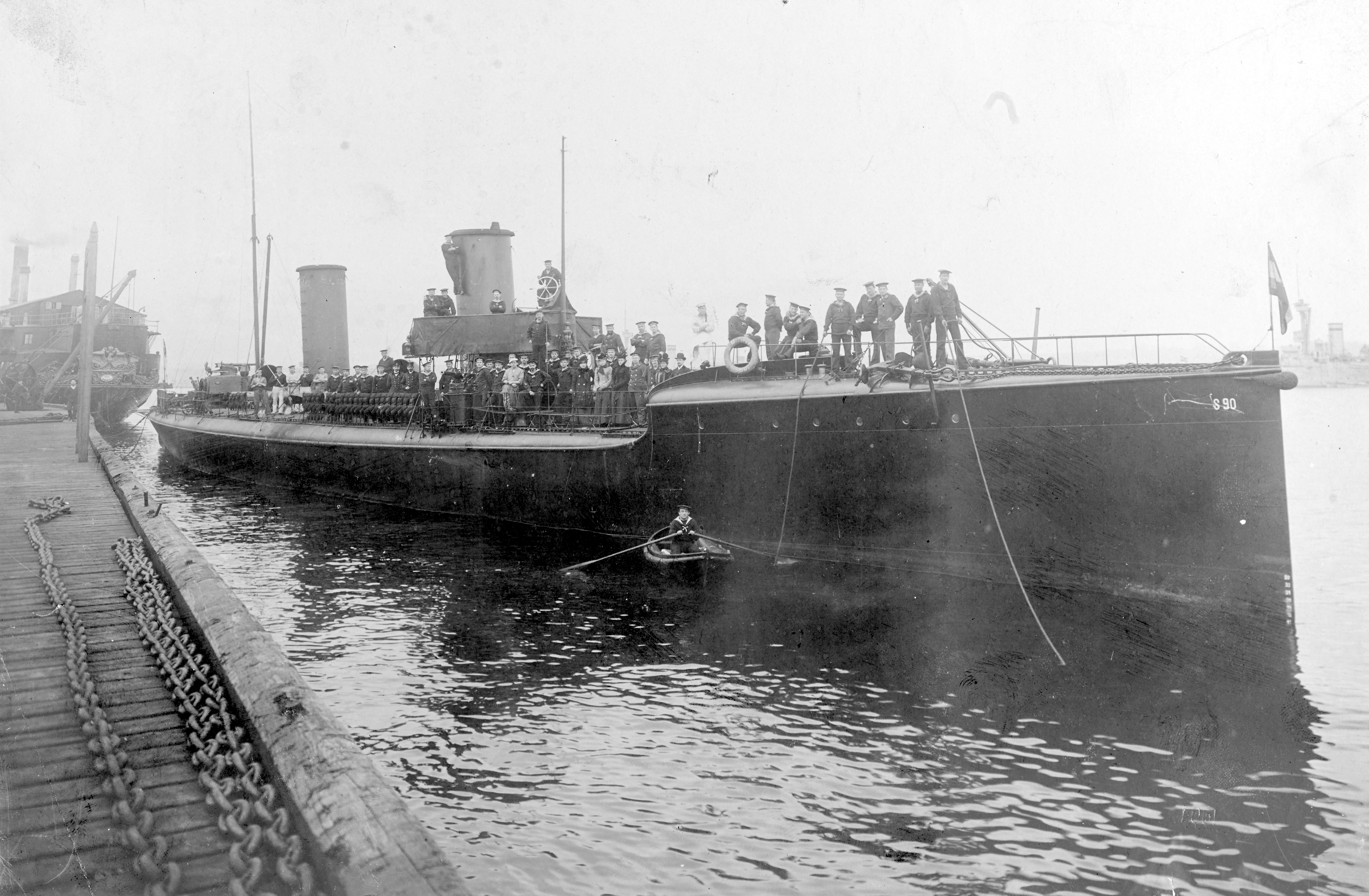
S90 in 1901

S90 was 63.0 metres (206 ft 8 in) long overall and 62.7 metres (205 ft 9 in) between perpendiculars, with a beam of 7.0 metres (23 ft 0 in) and a draught of 2.83 metres (9 ft 3 in). The ship displaced 310 tonnes (310 long tons) design and 394 tonnes (388 long tons) deep load. While most contemporary torpedo boats and destroyers had turtleback forecastles, the S90-class instead had a short raised forecastle, giving improved seakeeping.

Three coal-fired water-tube boilers fed steam at a pressure of 15.4 standard atmospheres (226 psi) to two sets of three-cylinder triple expansion steam engines. The ship's machinery was rated at 5,900 PS (5,800 ihp; 4,300 kW) giving a design speed of 26.5 knots (30.5 mph; 49.1 km/h). 93 tons of coal were carried, (Note: A total of 130 tons could be carried if stored in the engine rooms as well as the ship's coal bunkers. This would give rise to stability problems, however.) giving an endurance of 830 nautical miles (960 mi; 1,540 km) at 17 knots (20 mph; 31 km/h) or 690 nautical miles (790 mi; 1,280 km) at 20 knots (23 mph; 37 km/h). She reached a speed of 26.4 knots (30.4 mph; 48.9 km/h) during sea trials in November 1899, fully equipped and carrying 65 tons of coal.

Armament consisted of three 5.0 cm (2.0 in) SK L/40 guns, with two mounted side-by-side forward and one aft. Three single 45 cm torpedo tubes were fitted, with one in the gap between the ship's forecastle and the bridge, and two aft. Two spare torpedoes could be carried. The ship had a crew of 50 officers and other ranks.

== Service ==
S90, together with sister ships S91 and S92, was sent out to China in the company of the hospital ship Gera in 1900 in order to reinforce the German East Asiatic Squadron as a result of the ongoing Boxer Rebellion. S91 and S92 returned to Germany in the company of the cruiser Kaiserin Augusta in 1902.

At the outbreak of the First World War, S90 was one of two torpedo boats attached to the German East Asiatic Squadron, with the main base at Qingdao in China. The elderly S90, however, was only suitable for local patrols, while the ex-Chinese destroyer Taku was no longer operational. It had been planned to replace these two ships by S120 and S121. On 22 August 1914, the British destroyer Kennet, part of a British squadron patrolling off Qingdao, spotted S90 and tried to stop the German torpedo boat from returning to port. Kennet fired 136 rounds and one torpedo at S90, but S90 was undamaged and reached Qingdao safely, while S90's return fire damaged Kennet, disabling one of Kennet's guns and killing five of the British ship's crew.

Japan declared war on Germany on 23 August 1914, and soon began operations to besiege Qingdao. On 17 October 1914, S90 sortied from Qingdao and torpedoed the Japanese cruiser Takachiho before scuttling herself by intentionally running herself aground. Her crew were interned by neutral China in Nanking. They attempted escape on 30 October 1914, but were recaptured.
