= Yakov Hildebrandt =

Russian admiral (1842–1915)

Yakov Hildebrandt Яков Гильтебрандт
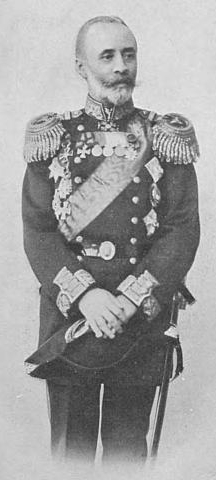
- Hildebrandt in 1900
- Born: Yakov Apollonovich Hildebrandt; 2 October 1842; Nizhny Novgorod, Russia
- Died: 27 May 1915 (aged 72); Pavlovsk, Petrograd, Russia
- Education: Naval Cadet Corps
- Military career
- Allegiance: Russia
- Branch: Imperial Russian Navy
- Service years: 1858–1909
- Rank: Admiral
- Conflicts: Boxer Rebellion: Battle of the Taku Forts

Yakov Apollonovich Hildebrandt (Russian: Яков Апполонович Гильтебрандт; 2 October [O.S. 20 September] 1842 – 27 May [O.S. 14 May] 1915) was a Russian admiral. He was most known for his service in the Boxer Rebellion during the Battle of the Taku Forts where he served as the primary commander.

== Early life ==
Yakov was born on 2 October (20 September O.S.) 1842 at the Nizhny Novgorod Governorate. He was born into the family of the doctor Apollon Ivanovich Hildebrandt. His grandfather, Ivan Andreevich Hildebrandt (1773-1822), was a child of a staff oiffcer before being released from the Moscow General Hospital as a junior physician in 1799 and died in the rank of collegiate assessor.

== Military career ==
On 22 April 1860, Hildebrandt was released from the Naval Cadet Corps with the rank of michman and enlisted in the Baltic Fleet2]. From 1860 to 1865, he participated in the grugo-light voyage on the corvette Kalevala. During his voyage, he was promoted to midshipman on 3 April 1862 and in the following year, he participated in hydrographic work in the western part of the Peter the Great Gulf. He then continued operations on the Baltic Sea from 1866 to 1870. The following year, he embarked on another voyage around the world aboard the corvette Bogatyr under Captain 2nd Rank D. Shavrov with Hildebrandt being promoted to Lieutenant Commander following his return on New Years Day 1875.

On 22 February 1880, Hildebrandt was made commander of the Sneg before being transferred to the Robber which he made another round-the-world voyage from 1883 to 1885 following a call in Honolulu. On 6 May 1884, for his "consideration of his excellent and diligent service", he was promoted to Captain 2nd Rank on 26 February 1885 by Aleksandr III himself. From 1885 to 1888, he commanded the cruiser Vladimir Monomakh in the Pacific Ocean and on 1 January 1887, he was promoted to Captain 1st Rank and continued service aboard the Vladimir Monomakh. On 1 October 1888, he commanded the armored ship Imperator Nikolai I and on 27 September 1891, he was approved to command the 15th Naval Crew. From 1892 to 1894, he served as a Counter Admiral as well as being Chief of Staff of the Black Sea Fleet as well as the ports on the Black Se with 1894 also being the year he served in the junior flagship of the Baltic fleet. From 1895 to 1896, Hildebrandt served as commander of the Training and Artillery Detachment of the Baltic Fleet from 26 September 1896, Assistant Chief of the Main Naval Staff from 26 January 1898 and a commander of a separate detachment of ships assigned for testing.

On 5 December 1898, he was promoted to Vice Admiral. From 1899 to 1900, he served as the head of the 1st Pacific Squadron and around that time, he travelled down south to China to quell the Boxer Rebellion and participate in the Battle of the Taku Forts. On 3 July 1900, he was dismissed from the post of squadron commander and on 1 January 1901, he was appointed to the senior flagship of the Black Sea Fleet. He was the commander of the Practical Squadron of the Black Sea Fleet and on 17 September 1902, according to the results of the Highest review of the ships of the Practical Squadron on the Sevastopol roadstead, he was awarded the Monarch's favor. From 1903 to 1907, in the senior flagship of the Baltic Fleet before later being head of the Main Hydrographic Directorate. Hildebrandt was a member of the commission for the revision of the Naval Regulations of 1885 which later received a revision in 1899 which would later examine the results of the inconclusive Battle of the Yellow Sea as well as the disastrous defeat of the Battle of Tsushima. On 10 January 1907, he was appointed a member of the Admiralty Council. Following his promotion to Admiral on 28 August 1909, he retired shortly after.

Hildebrandt died in Pavlovsk, Petrograd on 27 (14 O.S.) May 1915 following a battle with a long illness. He was buried in the local cemetery.

An island in the Peter the Great Gulf was named in honor of Hildebrandt that was surveyed in 1863 by the crew of the Kalevala at the same time it was named.

== Awards ==
=== Domestic ===
- Order of Saint Stanislaus
  - 3rd class (1865)
  - 2nd class (1871)
  - 1st class (1895)
- Order of Saint Anna
  - 3rd class (1871)
  - 2nd class (1880)
  - 1st class (1897)
- Order of Saint Vladimir
  - 4th class with bow for 20 campaigns (1875)
  - 3rd class (1891)
  - 2nd class with swords for distinction of the capture of the Taku Forts (1900)
- Silver Medal in Memory of the Reign of Emperor Alexander III (1896)
- Bronze medal for work on the 1st national census (1897)
- Silver Medal in Memory of the Sacred Coronation of Their Majesties (1898)
- Order of the White Eagle (28 March 1904)

=== Foreign ===
- Bulgaria: Order of St. Alexander, 1st class (1901)
- France: Legion of Honour
  - Officer (1886)
  - Commander (1897)
  - Grand Officer (1901)
- Hawaii: Royal Order of the Crown of Hawaii (1884)
- Siam: Order of the White Elephant (1897)
- Germany: Order of the Red Eagle, 2nd class with a star (1897)
- Germany: Order of the Crown (1902)
- Japan: Order of the Rising Sun, 1st class (1902)
- Romania: Order of the Crown of Romania, Grand Cross (1899)
- Romania: Order of the Star of Romania, Grand Cross (1901)
