= Russian destroyer Leytenant Burakov (1900) =

Destroyer of the Russian and Chinese Navies

Coordinates: 38°48′N 121°21′E

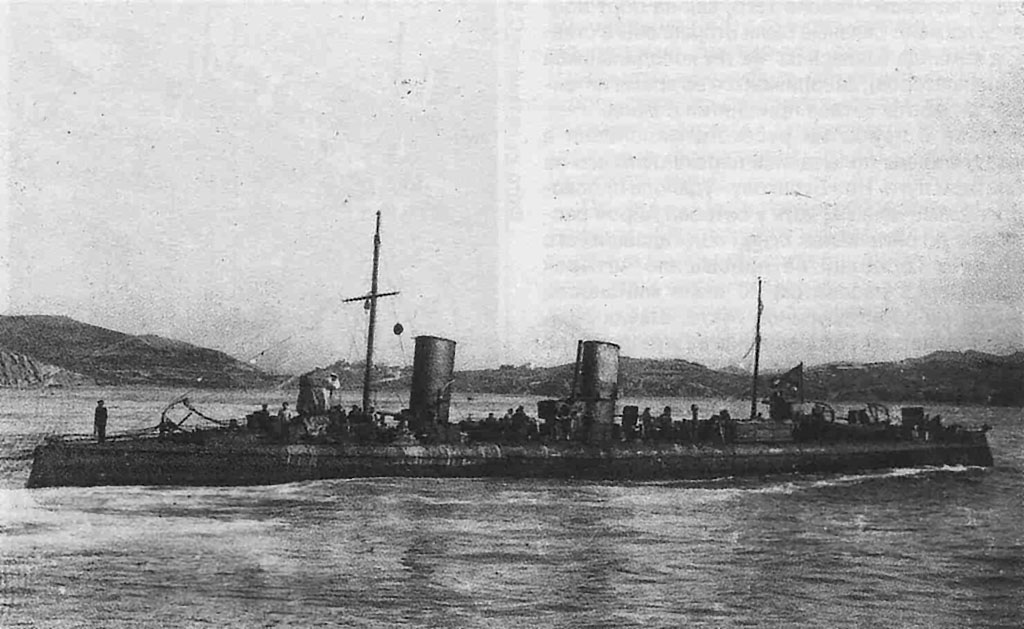
- Leytenant Burakov in 1904

History

Qing Dynasty
- Name: Hai Hua
- Ordered: 1896
- Builder: Schichau-Werke
- Launched: 1898
- Fate: Captured, 1900

Russian Empire
- Name: Taku (1900–1901); Leytenant Burakov (1901–1904)
- Commissioned: 9 February 1901
- Fate: Sunk, 26 July 1904

General characteristics
- Type: Destroyer
- Displacement: Normal: 280 long tons (284 t); Full load: 305 long tons (310 t)
- Length: 193 ft 6 in (58.98 m)
- Beam: 20 ft 0 in (6.10 m)
- Draft: 6 ft 6 in (1.98 m)
- Installed power: 6,000 ihp (4,500 kW)
- Propulsion: 2 × engines; 4 × boilers; 2 × propellers
- Speed: 32 knots (59 km/h; 37 mph)
- Armament: 6 × 3-pounder guns; 2 × 18 in (457 mm) torpedo tubes

Leytenant Burakov was a Hai Lung-class destroyer operated by the Imperial Russian Navy between 1900 and 1904. She was built as Hai Hua in Germany for the Qing Dynasty as part of an effort to rebuild the Imperial Chinese Navy following the First Sino-Japanese War, and launched in 1898. The destroyer, along with her squadron, was captured by a British contingent during the Battle of the Taku Forts in 1900 and distributed to members of the Eight-Nation Alliance. The ship was given to the Russian Navy and briefly named Taku before she was renamed Leytenant Burakov. In Russian service, she operated out of Port Arthur. During the Siege of Port Arthur during the Russian-Japanese War, the destroyer operated as a dispatch vessel to outrun the Japanese blockade. On 24 July 1904, she was torpedoed by a Japanese launch while at anchor, and sank two days later.

== Design and development ==
During the First Sino-Japanese War, the Beiyang Fleet of the Qing dynasty suffered heavy losses and was unable to resist Japanese offensives. All but one ship was destroyed, and the Dynasty began to rebuild the fleet by purchasing new ships aboard in 1894 despite a lack of funds. In 1896, four torpedo boat destroyers were ordered from the Schichau-Werke shipyard in Germany. The Hai Lung-class destroyers—named Hai Lung, Hai Hua, Hai Jing, and Hai Hse—had a length between perpendiculars of 193 feet 6 inches (58.98 m), a beam of 20 feet 0 inches (6.10 m), and a draught of 6 feet 6 inches (1.98 m). They displaced 280 long tons (284 t) at normal load and 305 long tons (310 t) at full load, and carried a complement of either 50 or 57. Propulsion was provided by two propellers powered by two triple-expansion steam engines supplied by four Schichau-Thornycroft water-tube boilers, which developed 6,000 indicated horsepower (4,500 kW) and gave the ships a designed top speed of 32 knots (59 km/h; 37 mph). The destroyers carried approximately 67 long tons (68 t) of coal that enabled a range of 3,000 miles (4,800 km) at a cruising speed of 12 knots (22 km/h; 14 mph). Armament consisted of six 3-pounder guns mounted on the broadside on the bow, midship, and stern along with two single 18 in (457 mm) torpedo tubes mounted in front and behind the second funnel. The designs also featured a steel hull, ram on the bow, and two slender funnels.

== Service history ==
=== Chinese service ===
Progress on the destroyers was slow, but they were finished and launched in late 1898. Due to the winter, delivery of the destroyers were delayed until 1899. Once in China, the ships were assigned to the rebuilt Beiyang Fleet off Taku. During the Boxer Rebellion, the four ships were moored at the Taku Dockyards when an Eight-Nation Alliance fleet arrived to relieve Peking and crush the rebellion. The allied fleet was ordered to attack enemy forces that directly opposed then and saw the torpedo boats prepare to get underway. In the opening stage of the Battle of the Taku Forts on 17 June 1900, British destroyers HMS Fame and HMS Whiting led by Roger Keyes were dispatched to seize the ships. At 2 in the morning, each destroyer towed a whaleboat, both loaded with 13 men, down the Peiho River. The four British vessels each targeted one of the destroyers as they pulled alongside. After a brief engagement, the Chinese crew was routed and the four destroyers were captured.

=== Russian service ===
After the Battle of the Taku Forts, the captured Hai Lung-class destroyers were distributed among the French, Russian, British, and German navies. Hai Hua was given to the Imperial Russian Navy and was renamed Taku when she was handed over from the Royal Navy. On 27 January 1901, the destroyer was renamed Leytenant Burakov (Lieutenant Burakov) in honour of Evgeni Burakov, a gunnery officer killed onboard the Russian gunboat Koreetz during the battle. The destroyer was commissioned on 9 February and assigned to the Siberian Flotilla. Immediately before the Russian-Japanese War, one of her torpedo tubes was removed and replaced by a whitehead torpedo launcher from the destroyer Statni. Plans to replace the second launcher was also made, but never completed.

During the Russian-Japanese War, Leytenant Burakov was assigned to the Port Arthur Squadron. As the fastest ship in the squadron, she was used as a dispatch vessel to run the Japanese blockade and maintain communication with other Russian forces. Five of the guns were removed to lighten the ship, and her first trip was on 2 June 1904, to inform the Russian commander-in-chief in Manchuria about the Squadron's planned sortie. She made another trip carrying information for the commander-in-chief that and arrived at Inkou on 15 June. On 24 July, the destroyer was anchored off Tahe, East of Port Arthur, serving as a picket. In the early morning, Japanese battleships Mikasa and Fuji deployed one launch each to attack the anchored ships. The Japanese boats were equipped with steam engines and two torpedoes each. At 2:32 am, one of the boats shot a torpedo at Leytenant Burakov, which struck her engine room on the port side. Russian destroyer Boevoi was also torpedoed in the attack and suffered irreparable damage. Another Russian destroyer, Grozovoi, attempted to tow the crippled Leytenant Burakov into shallow water in an attempt to save the ship. Two days after the attack, Leytenant Burakov broke in two and sank in the bay.
