= HMS Taku (1900) =

Destroyer of the British and Chinese Navies

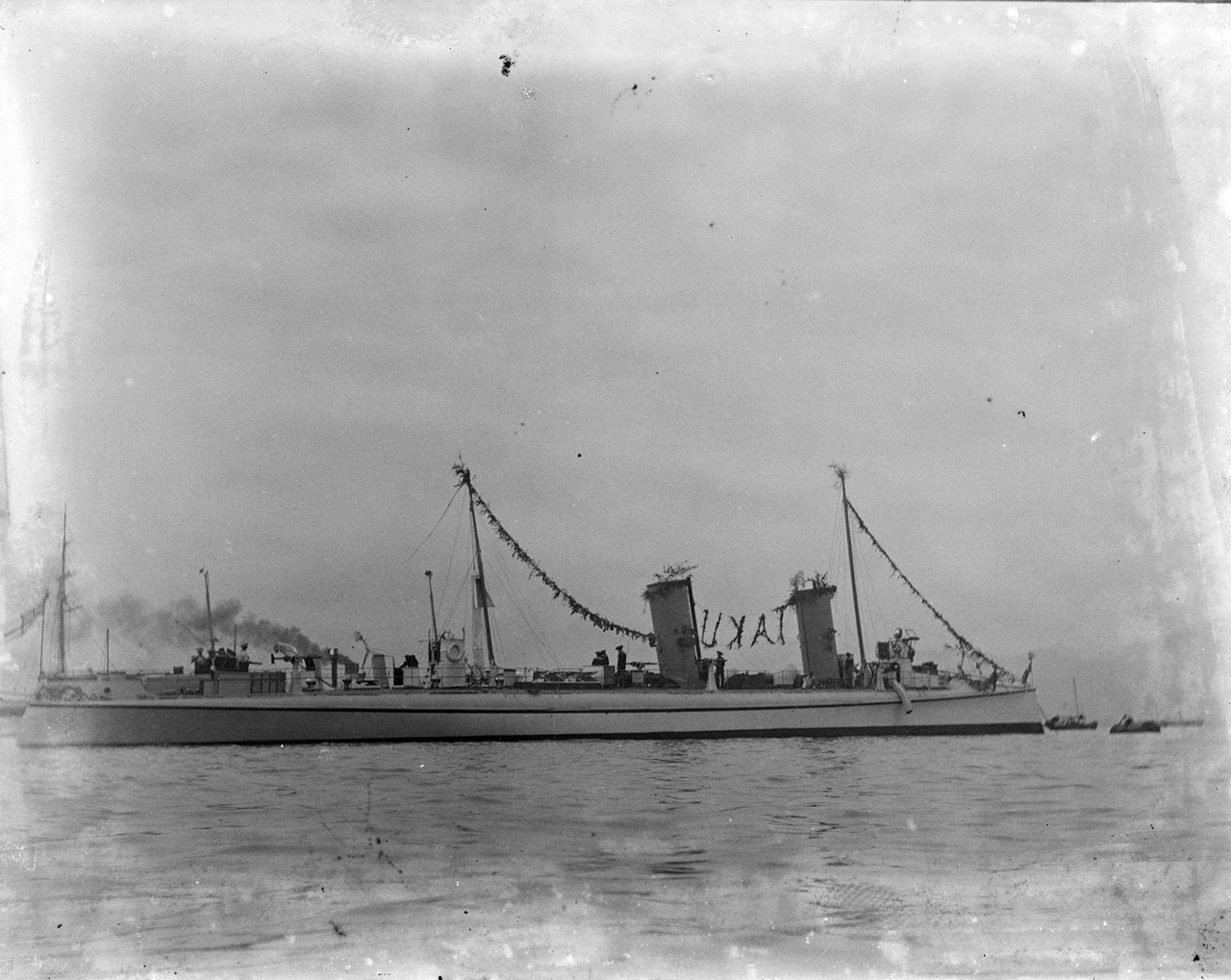
- HMS Taku off Hong Kong on Christmas Day 1900

History

Qing Dynasty
- Name: Hai Lung
- Ordered: 1896
- Builder: Schichau-Werke
- Launched: 1898
- Fate: Captured, 1900

United Kingdom
- Name: Taku
- Commissioned: 1900
- Fate: Scrapped, 1916

General characteristics
- Type: Destroyer
- Displacement: Normal: 280 long tons (284 t); Full load: 305 long tons (310 t)
- Length: 193 ft 6 in (58.98 m)
- Beam: 20 ft 0 in (6.10 m)
- Draft: 6 ft 6 in (1.98 m)
- Installed power: 6,000 ihp (4,500 kW)
- Propulsion: 2 × engines; 4 × boilers; 2 × propellers
- Speed: 32 knots (59 km/h; 37 mph)
- Armament: 6 × 3-pounder guns; 2 × 18 in (457 mm) torpedo tubes

HMS Taku was a Hai Lung-class destroyer captured by the Royal Navy during the Battle of the Taku Forts in the Boxer Rebellion. The destroyer was built by the Qing Dynasty as Hai Lung as part of an effort to rebuild the Navy following the First Sino-Japanese War. She reached China in 1899, captured by the British in 1900, and operated off Hong Kong as a tender until she was scrapped in 1916.

== Design and development ==
During the First Sino-Japanese War, the Beiyang Fleet of the Qing dynasty suffered heavy losses and was unable to resist Japanese offensives. All but one ship was destroyed, and the Dynasty began to rebuild the fleet by purchasing new ships aboard in 1894 despite a lack of funds. In 1896, four torpedo boat destroyers were ordered from the Schichau-Werke shipyard in Germany. The Hai Lung-class destroyers—named Hai Lung, Hai Hua, Hai Ching, and Hai Hse—had a length between perpendiculars of 193 feet 6 inches (58.98 m), a beam of 20 feet 0 inches (6.10 m), and a draught of 6 feet 6 inches (1.98 m). They displaced 280 long tons (284 t) at normal load and 305 long tons (310 t) at full load, and carried a complement of either 50 or 57. Propulsion was provided by two propellers powered by two triple-expansion steam engines supplied by four Schichau-Thornycroft water-tube boilers, which developed 6,000 indicated horsepower (4,500 kW) and gave the ships a designed top speed of 32 knots (59 km/h; 37 mph). The destroyers carried approximately 67 long tons (68 t) of coal that enabled a range of 3,000 miles (4,800 km) at a cruising speed of 12 knots (22 km/h; 14 mph). Armament consisted of six 3-pounder guns mounted on the broadside on the bow, midship, and stern along with two single 18 in (457 mm) torpedo tubes mounted in front and behind the second funnel. The designs also featured a steel hull, ram on the bow, and two slender funnels.

== Service history ==
=== Chinese service ===
Progress on the destroyers was slow, but they were finished and launched in late 1898. Due to the winter, delivery of the destroyers were delayed until 1899. Once in China, the ships were assigned to the rebuilt Beiyang Fleet off Taku. During the Boxer Rebellion, the four ships were moored at the Taku Dockyards when an Eight-Nation Alliance fleet arrived to relieve Peking and crush the rebellion. The allied forces were ordered to attack enemy forces that directly opposed then and saw the torpedo boats prepare to get underway. In the opening stage of the Battle of the Taku Forts on 17 June 1900, British destroyers HMS Fame and HMS Whiting led by Roger Keyes were dispatched to seize the ships. At 2 in the morning, each destroyer towed a whaleboat, both loaded with 13 men, down the Peiho River. The four British vessels each targeted one of the destroyers as they pulled alongside. After a brief engagement, the Chinese crew was routed and the four destroyers were captured.

=== British service ===
After the Battle of the Taku Forts, the captured Hai Lung-class destroyers were renamed Taku and distributed among the French, Russian, British, and German navies. Hai Lung was commissioned into the Royal Navy as HMS Taku and towed by HMS Fame to Hong Kong. The British were concerned that German-built destroyers had a top speed as high as 35 knots (65 km/h; 40 mph), but discovered the light and weak construction of Taku limited her practicality and was inferior to British designs. As a result, she was used as a tender ship at the Royal Navy's base in Hong Kong. The destroyer was sold off on 25 October 1916 at Hong Kong and scrapped.
