= French destroyer Takou =

Destroyer of the French and Chinese Navies

History

Qing Dynasty
- Name: Hai Hse
- Ordered: 1896
- Builder: Schichau-Werke
- Launched: 1898
- Fate: Captured, 1900

France
- Name: Takou
- Commissioned: 20 June 1900
- Fate: Ran aground, 1911

General characteristics
- Type: Destroyer
- Displacement: Normal: 280 long tons (284 t); Full load: 305 long tons (310 t)
- Length: 193 ft 6 in (58.98 m)
- Beam: 20 ft 0 in (6.10 m)
- Draft: 6 ft 6 in (1.98 m)
- Installed power: 6,000 ihp (4,500 kW)
- Propulsion: 2 × engines; 4 × boilers; 2 × propellers
- Speed: 32 knots (59 km/h; 37 mph)
- Armament: 6 × 3-pounder guns; 2 × 18 in (457 mm) torpedo tubes

Takou was a Hai Lung-class destroyer operated by the French Navy between 1900 and 1911. The destroyer was delivered to the Qing Dynasty in 1899 as Hai Hse as part of an effort to rebuild the Navy following the First Sino-Japanese War. The destroyer, along with her squadron, was captured by a British contingent during the Battle of the Taku Forts in 1900 and distributed to members of the Eight-Nation Alliance. While in French service, she operated out of Saigon until she ran aground and wrecked in 1911.

== Design and development ==
During the First Sino-Japanese War, the Beiyang Fleet of the Qing dynasty suffered heavy losses and was unable to resist Japanese offensives. All but one ship was destroyed, and the Dynasty began to rebuild the fleet by purchasing new ships aboard in 1894 despite a lack of funds. In 1896, four torpedo boat destroyers were ordered from the Schichau-Werke shipyard in Germany. The Hai Lung–class destroyers—named Hai Lung, Hai Hua, Hai Ching, and Hai Hse—had a length between perpendiculars of 193 feet 6 inches (58.98 m), a beam of 20 feet 0 inches (6.10 m), and a draught of 6 feet 6 inches (1.98 m). They displaced 280 long tons (284 t) at normal load and 305 long tons (310 t) at full load, and carried a complement of either 50 or 57. Propulsion was provided by two propellers powered by two triple-expansion steam engines supplied by four Schichau-Thornycroft water-tube boilers, which developed 6,000 indicated horsepower (4,500 kW) and gave the ships a designed top speed of 32 knots (59 km/h; 37 mph). The destroyers carried approximately 67 long tons (68 t) of coal that enabled a range of 3,000 miles (4,800 km) at a cruising speed of 12 knots (22 km/h; 14 mph). Armament consisted of six 3-pounder guns mounted on the broadside on the bow, midship, and stern along with two single 18 in (457 mm) torpedo tubes mounted in front and behind the second funnel. The designs also featured a steel hull, ram on the bow, and two slender funnels.

== Service history ==
=== Chinese service ===
Progress on the destroyers was slow, but they were finished and launched in late 1898. Due to the winter, delivery of the destroyers were delayed until 1899. Once in China, the ships were assigned to the rebuilt Beiyang Fleet off Taku. During the Boxer Rebellion, the four ships were moored at the Taku Dockyards when an Eight-Nation Alliance fleet arrived to relieve Peking and crush the rebellion. The allies were ordered to attack enemy forces that directly opposed then and saw the torpedo boats prepare to get underway. In the opening stage of the Battle of the Taku Forts on 17 June 1900, British destroyers HMS Fame and HMS Whiting led by Roger Keyes were dispatched to seize the ships. At two in the morning, each destroyer towed a whaleboat, both loaded with 13 men, down the Peiho River. The four British vessels each targeted one of the destroyers as they pulled alongside. After a brief engagement, the Chinese crew was routed and the four destroyers were captured.

=== French service ===
After the Battle of the Taku Forts, the captured Hai Lung–class destroyers were distributed among the French, Russian, British, and German navies. Hai Hse was given to the French Navy, renamed Takou, and commissioned on 20 June 1900. The French found her to be lightly built, lie low in the water, and bounce between the waves. Light pitching caused the propellers to briefly emerge and the ship was never able to reach her top speed. She operated as a division boat for the torpedo boat squadron assigned to Saigon. After the boilers were worn out, the Navy considered reequipping her with two 2 in (47 mm) guns, two 1 in (37 mm) guns, and two 15 in (381 mm) torpedo tubes, but did not have an opportunity to go through with the plan. On 22 February 1911, she ran aground off Poulo Condor Island. The ship was salvaged on 27 April but was in such a poor condition that she was instead condemned on 30 September and disposed of.
