= Tahe County =

Tahe County 塔河县
- County
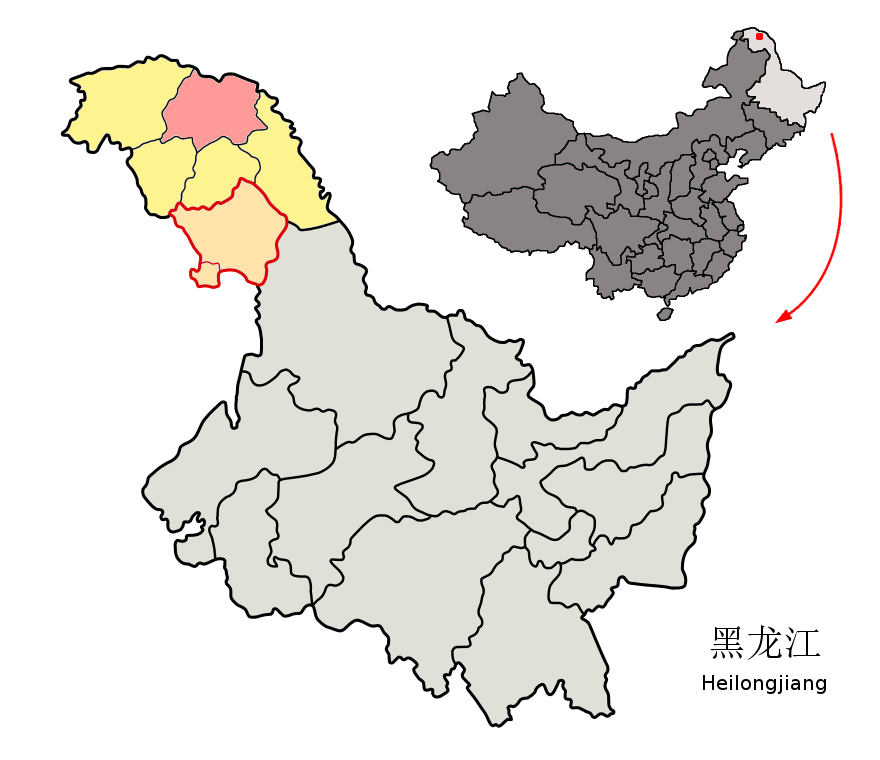
- Tahe County (red) in Daxing'anling Prefecture (yellow) and Heilongjiang

- Location of the county seat in Heilongjiang
- Coordinates: 52°20′02″N 124°42′36″E
- Country: People's Republic of China
- Province: Heilongjiang
- Prefecture: Daxing'anling

Area
  - Total: 14,103 km^{2} (5,445 sq mi)

Population
  - Total: 92,473
  - Density: 6.5570/km^{2} (16.982/sq mi)
- Time zone: UTC+8 (China Standard)

Tahe (Chinese: 塔河; pinyin: Tǎhé) is a county in the far north of Heilongjiang province, and is the northernmost Chinese county. It is under the jurisdiction of Daxing'anling Prefecture.

== Administrative divisions ==
Tahe County is divided into 4 towns, 2 townships and 1 ethnic township.

4 towns

- Tahe (塔河镇)
- Walagan (瓦拉干镇)
- Pangu (盘古镇)
- Guyi (古驿镇)

2 townships

- Yisiken (依西肯乡)
- Kaikukang (开库康乡)

1 ethnic township

- Shibazhan Oroqen (十八站鄂伦春族乡)

== Demographics ==
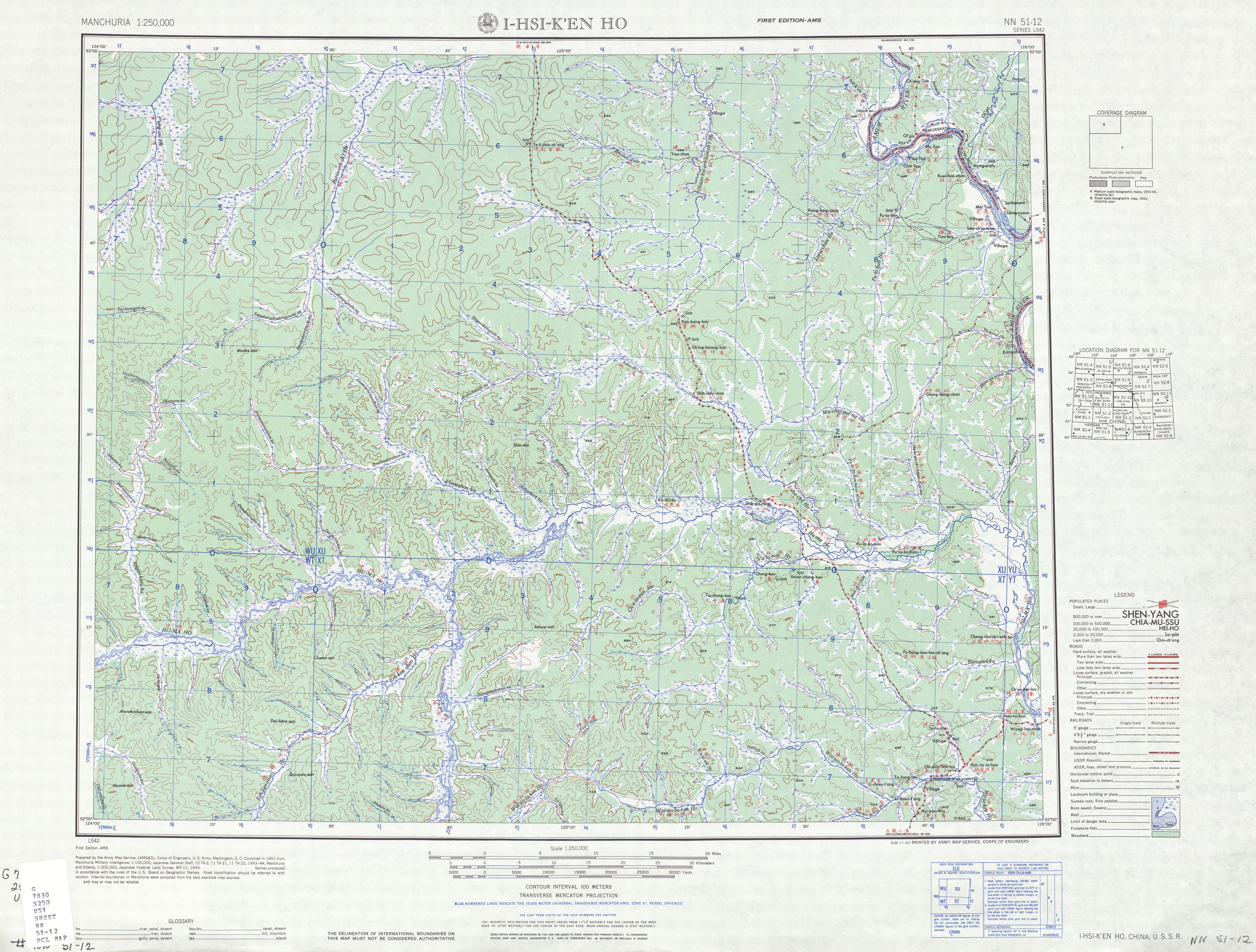
Yixiken River (labelled as I-hsi-k'en Ho 依西肯河) (1951)

The population of the district was 106,732 in 1999.

== Climate ==
Tahe County has a subarctic climate (Köppen Dwc) with short, warm, wet summers and long, brutally cold and dry winters. Monsoonal influences are strong, as 75% of the annual precipitation occurs from June to September. Although snowfall is extremely light, totalling only a few centimetres during the winter, it does not melt until May. The region is in the discontinuous permafrost zone, which severely limits land use possibilities since only exposed areas thaw fully during the summer, and fishing is the most important economic activity.

Climate data for Tahe, elevation 362 m (1,188 ft), (1991–2020 normals, extremes 1971–2010)
| Month | Jan | Feb | Mar | Apr | May | Jun | Jul | Aug | Sep | Oct | Nov | Dec | Year |
|---|---|---|---|---|---|---|---|---|---|---|---|---|---|
| Record high °C (°F) | −0.2 (31.6) | 6.3 (43.3) | 17.9 (64.2) | 26.9 (80.4) | 34.7 (94.5) | 38.0 (100.4) | 37.3 (99.1) | 36.5 (97.7) | 31.6 (88.9) | 27.7 (81.9) | 10.5 (50.9) | 0.8 (33.4) | 38.0 (100.4) |
| Mean daily maximum °C (°F) | −16.1 (3.0) | −10.1 (13.8) | −1.8 (28.8) | 8.9 (48.0) | 18.0 (64.4) | 24.3 (75.7) | 26.1 (79.0) | 23.7 (74.7) | 17.4 (63.3) | 6.6 (43.9) | −7.6 (18.3) | −16.9 (1.6) | 6.0 (42.9) |
| Daily mean °C (°F) | −24.9 (−12.8) | −20.6 (−5.1) | −10.4 (13.3) | 1.6 (34.9) | 10.0 (50.0) | 16.4 (61.5) | 19.2 (66.6) | 16.4 (61.5) | 9.0 (48.2) | −0.9 (30.4) | −15.6 (3.9) | −24.3 (−11.7) | −2.0 (28.4) |
| Mean daily minimum °C (°F) | −31.5 (−24.7) | −29.0 (−20.2) | −19.1 (−2.4) | −5.8 (21.6) | 1.6 (34.9) | 8.3 (46.9) | 12.7 (54.9) | 10.2 (50.4) | 2.1 (35.8) | −7.6 (18.3) | −22.3 (−8.1) | −30.4 (−22.7) | −9.2 (15.4) |
| Record low °C (°F) | −47.9 (−54.2) | −44.9 (−48.8) | −37.1 (−34.8) | −23.7 (−10.7) | −11.8 (10.8) | −4.3 (24.3) | 0.4 (32.7) | −0.7 (30.7) | −10.3 (13.5) | −28.7 (−19.7) | −39.6 (−39.3) | −45.3 (−49.5) | −47.9 (−54.2) |
| Average precipitation mm (inches) | 5.3 (0.21) | 3.8 (0.15) | 5.9 (0.23) | 16.3 (0.64) | 52.5 (2.07) | 85.1 (3.35) | 133.0 (5.24) | 92.1 (3.63) | 54.3 (2.14) | 22.5 (0.89) | 11.2 (0.44) | 7.1 (0.28) | 489.1 (19.27) |
| Average precipitation days (≥ 0.1 mm) | 7.6 | 5.7 | 4.9 | 6.9 | 11.0 | 14.1 | 15.9 | 14.5 | 11.3 | 7.6 | 8.1 | 9.2 | 116.8 |
| Average snowy days | 9.4 | 7.3 | 6.9 | 7.1 | 1.6 | 0.1 | 0 | 0 | 0.6 | 7.7 | 10.4 | 11.3 | 62.4 |
| Average relative humidity (%) | 68 | 64 | 57 | 52 | 56 | 71 | 79 | 81 | 73 | 64 | 69 | 69 | 67 |
| Mean monthly sunshine hours | 149.0 | 191.1 | 254.3 | 234.6 | 216.9 | 232.2 | 200.3 | 194.7 | 190.3 | 183.8 | 156.4 | 131.4 | 2,335 |
| Percentage possible sunshine | 58 | 68 | 68 | 56 | 44 | 47 | 40 | 44 | 51 | 57 | 61 | 55 | 54 |
Source 1: China Meteorological Administration
Source 2: Weather China
