= SMS Taku =

Destroyer of the German and Chinese Navies

Coordinates: 36°9′N 120°15′E

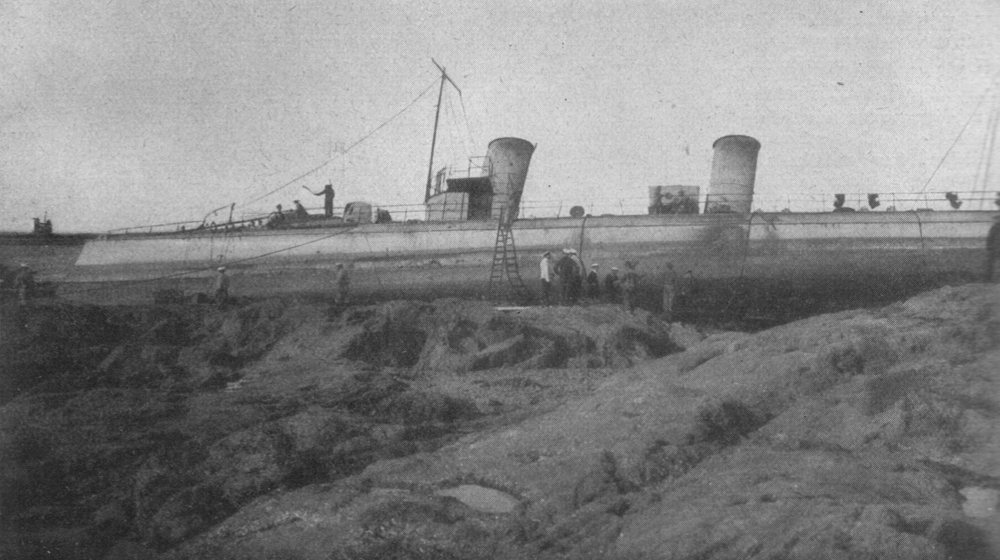
- SMS Taku after running aground near Qingdao on 22 October 1913

History

Qing Dynasty
- Name: Hai Jing
- Ordered: 1896
- Builder: Schichau-Werke
- Launched: 1898
- Fate: Captured, 1900

German Empire
- Name: Taku
- Commissioned: 8 December 1900
- Stricken: 13 June 1914
- Fate: Scuttled, 28 September 1914

General characteristics
- Type: Destroyer
- Displacement: Normal: 280 long tons (284 t); Full load: 305 long tons (310 t)
- Length: 193 ft 6 in (58.98 m)
- Beam: 20 ft 0 in (6.10 m)
- Draft: 6 ft 6 in (1.98 m)
- Installed power: 6,000 ihp (4,500 kW)
- Propulsion: 2 × engines; 4 × boilers; 2 × propellers
- Speed: 32 knots (59 km/h; 37 mph)
- Armament: 6 × 3-pounder guns; 2 × 18 in (457 mm) torpedo tubes

SMS Taku was a Hai Lung-class destroyer operated by the Imperial German Navy between 1900 and 1914. The destroyer was delivered to the Qing Dynasty in 1899 as Hai Jing as part of an effort to rebuild the Navy following the First Sino-Japanese War. The destroyer, along with her squadron, was captured by a British contingent during the Battle of the Taku Forts in 1900 and distributed to members of the Eight-Nation Alliance. In German service, she was renamed and operated out of Tsingtao. Due to boiler issues, she was decommissioned in 1914. After technical difficulties prevented her from being used during the Siege of Tsingtao, she was scuttled in the city's bay on 28 September 1914.

== Design and development ==
During the First Sino-Japanese War, the Beiyang Fleet of the Qing dynasty suffered heavy losses and was unable to resist Japanese offensives. All but one ship was destroyed, and the Dynasty began to rebuild the fleet by purchasing new ships aboard in 1894 despite a lack of funds. In 1896, four torpedo boat destroyers were ordered from the Schichau-Werke shipyard in Germany. The Hai Lung-class destroyers—named Hai Lung, Hai Hua, Hai Jing, and Hai Hse—had a length between perpendiculars of 193 feet 6 inches (58.98 m), a beam of 20 feet 0 inches (6.10 m), and a draught of 6 feet 6 inches (1.98 m). They displaced 280 long tons (284 t) at normal load and 305 long tons (310 t) at full load, and carried a complement of either 50 or 57. Propulsion was provided by two propellers powered by two triple-expansion steam engines supplied by four Schichau-Thornycroft water-tube boilers, which developed 6,000 indicated horsepower (4,500 kW) and gave the ships a designed top speed of 32 knots (59 km/h; 37 mph). The destroyers carried approximately 67 long tons (68 t) of coal that enabled a range of 3,000 miles (4,800 km) at a cruising speed of 12 knots (22 km/h; 14 mph). Armament consisted of six 3-pounder guns mounted on the broadside on the bow, midship, and stern along with two single 18 in (457 mm) torpedo tubes mounted in front and behind the second funnel. The designs also featured a steel hull, ram on the bow, and two slender funnels.

== Service history ==
=== Chinese service ===
Progress on the destroyers was slow, but they were finished and launched in late 1898. Due to the winter, delivery of the destroyers were delayed until 1899. Once in China, the ships were assigned to the rebuilt Beiyang Fleet off Taku. During the Boxer Rebellion, the four ships were moored at the Taku Dockyards when an Eight-Nation Alliance fleet arrived to relieve Peking and crush the rebellion. The allied fleet was ordered to attack enemy forces that directly opposed then and saw the torpedo boats prepare to get underway. In the opening stage of the Battle of the Taku Forts on 17 June 1900, British destroyers HMS Fame and HMS Whiting led by Roger Keyes were dispatched to seize the ships. At 2 in the morning, each destroyer towed a whaleboat, both loaded with 13 men, down the Peiho River. The four British vessels each targeted one of the destroyers as they pulled alongside. After a brief engagement, the Chinese crew was routed and the four destroyers were captured.

=== German service ===
After the Battle of the Taku Forts, the captured Hai Lung-class destroyers were distributed among the French, Russian, British, and German navies. Hai Jing (also spelled Hai Ching) was given to the Imperial German Navy, renamed Taku, and entered service on 6 December 1900. Under German service, she was based out of Tsingtao and assigned to the East Asia Squadron and made various voyages along the Yangtze River. In 1901, her crew was reassigned to the newly commissioned gunboat SMS Vorwärts and on 13 June 1914, she was decommissioned as a result of worn-out boilers due to her voyages in the Yangtze. At the outbreak of World War I, she was recommissioned and manned by crew from several river gunboats, but the resulting voyage exposed severe issues regarding her boilers and condensers. To prevent her capture by Japanese forces during the Siege of Tsingtao, Taku and several other vessels were rigged with explosives and scuttled in the bay on 28 September 1914. The wreck rests between 50 and 60 m (160 and 200 ft) under the water.
