= Battle of the Taku Forts (1900) =

Battle of the Boxer Rebellion

- Part of the Boxer Rebellion
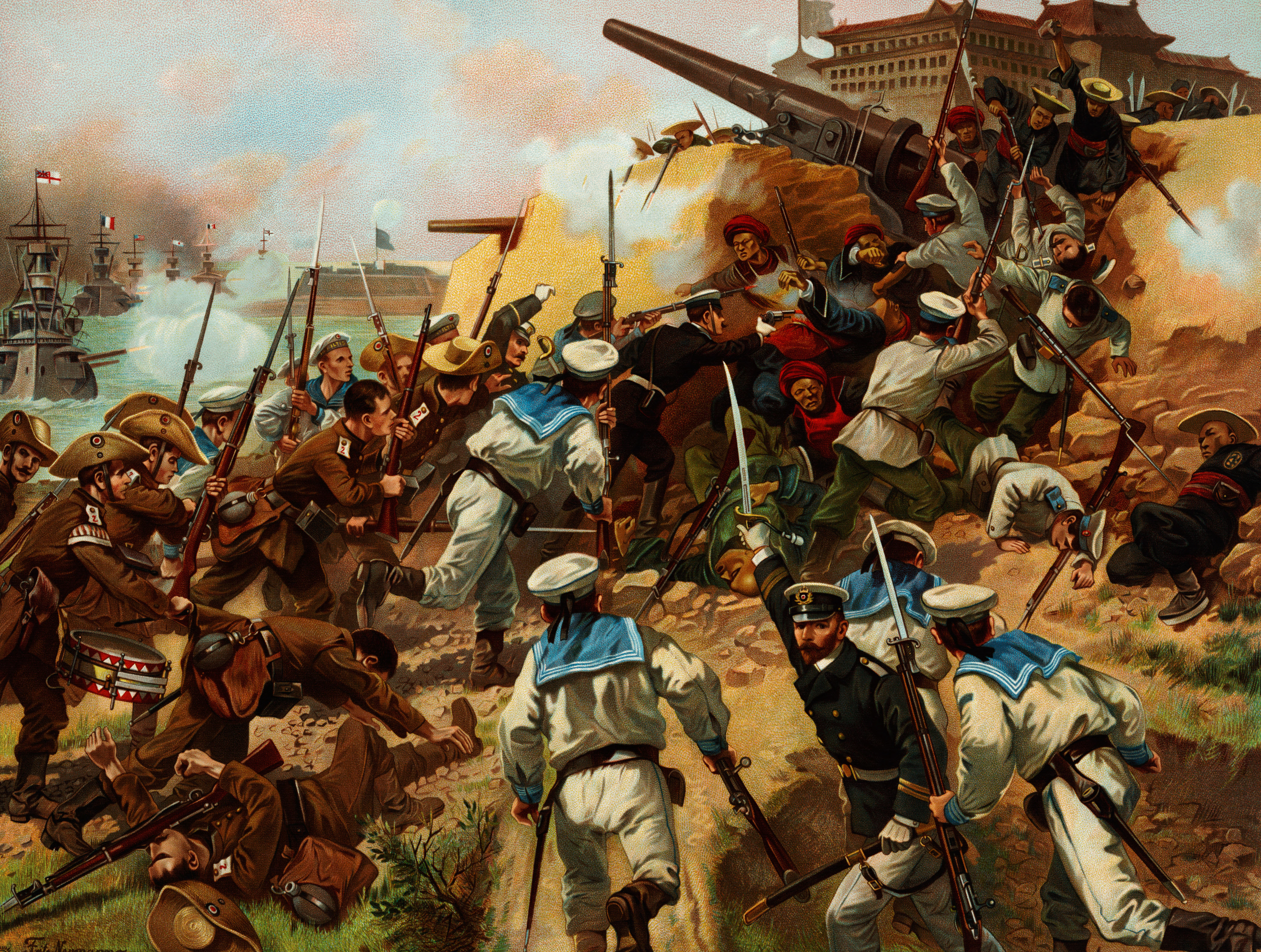
- Illustration of the battle
Date	16–17 June 1900
Location	Taku Forts, Tianjin, China 38°58′37″N 117°42′19″E
Result	Allied victory

Belligerents
Eight-Nation Alliance; Russia; United Kingdom; Japan; Germany; Austria-Hungary; Italy	Qing dynasty

Commanders and leaders
(Russian Empire) Yakov Hildebrandt (United Kingdom of Great Britain and Ireland) Christopher Cradock (German Empire) Hugo von Pohl	(Qing dynasty) General Lo Jung-Kuang

Strength
900 men 10 ships	1,000 soldiers and sailors 4 destroyers

Casualties and losses
172 killed and wounded	Unknown

The Battle of the Taku or Battle of Dagu Forts (Chinese: 大沽口砲臺之戰) was a short engagement during the Boxer Rebellion between the Chinese Qing dynasty military and forces belonging to the Eight Nation Alliance in June 1900. European and Japanese naval forces captured the Taku forts after a brief but bloody battle with units of the Qing dynasty. Their loss prompted the Qing government to side with the Boxers while the Chinese army was ordered to resist all foreign military forces within Chinese territory. Allied powers remained in control of the forts until the end of the Boxer Rebellion in September 1901.

== Background ==
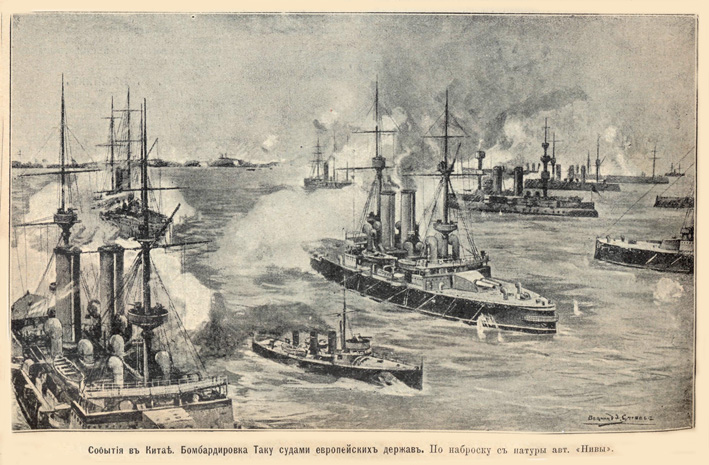
Allied ships at the Taku forts

In mid-June 1900, allied forces in northern China were vastly outnumbered. In Beijing there were 450 soldiers and marines from eight countries protecting the diplomatic legations. Somewhere between Tianjin and Beijing were the 2,000 men in the Seymour Expedition attempting to get to Beijing to reinforce the legation guards. In Tianjin were 2,400 Allied soldiers, mostly Russians. All of these forces were menaced by thousands of "Boxers", members of an indigenous peasant movement that aimed to end foreign influence in China. The Qing government of China was wavering between supporting the Boxers in their anti-foreign crusade or suppressing them because they represented a threat to the dynasty.

A few miles offshore in the Yellow Sea were a large number of Western and Japanese warships. On June 15, Chinese forces deployed electric mines in the Hai River before the battle to prevent the Eight-Nation Alliance from sending ships to attack. With their supply and communication lines to Tianjin threatened, the commanders of the ships met on June 16. Control of the Taku forts at the mouth of the Hai River was the key to maintaining a foothold in northern China. Vice-Admiral Hildebrandt, from the Imperial Russian Navy, through Lieutenant Bakhmetev, sent a message to the commander of the forts, who then sent a message by telegraph to the Governor of Zhili Province, stating that they proposed to "occupy provisionally, by consent or by force" the Taku Forts and demanded that Chinese forces surrender the forts before 2 a.m. on June 17. Of the Allied countries represented, only the United States Navy’s Rear Admiral Louis Kempff demurred, stating that he had no authority to undertake hostilities against China. Kempff said that an attack was an "act of war", and therefore refused to participate. However, Kempff agreed that an aging American gunboat, the USS Monocacy, could be stationed near the forts as a place of refuge for civilians in the vicinity.

Only ten ships could cross over the banks at the river’s mouth to enter the Hai River—two hundred yards wide—from where the four forts could be occupied or assaulted. 900 men were assembled to undertake the operation. The Chinese soldiers and sailors in the forts and on several modern gunboats docked along the river consisted of about 1,000 men. The Chinese also began laying mines near the mouth of the river and installing torpedo tubes in the forts. In the evening of June 16, the foreign warships began entering the river and taking up their stations from which the Taku Forts could be occupied or assaulted.

== Battle ==
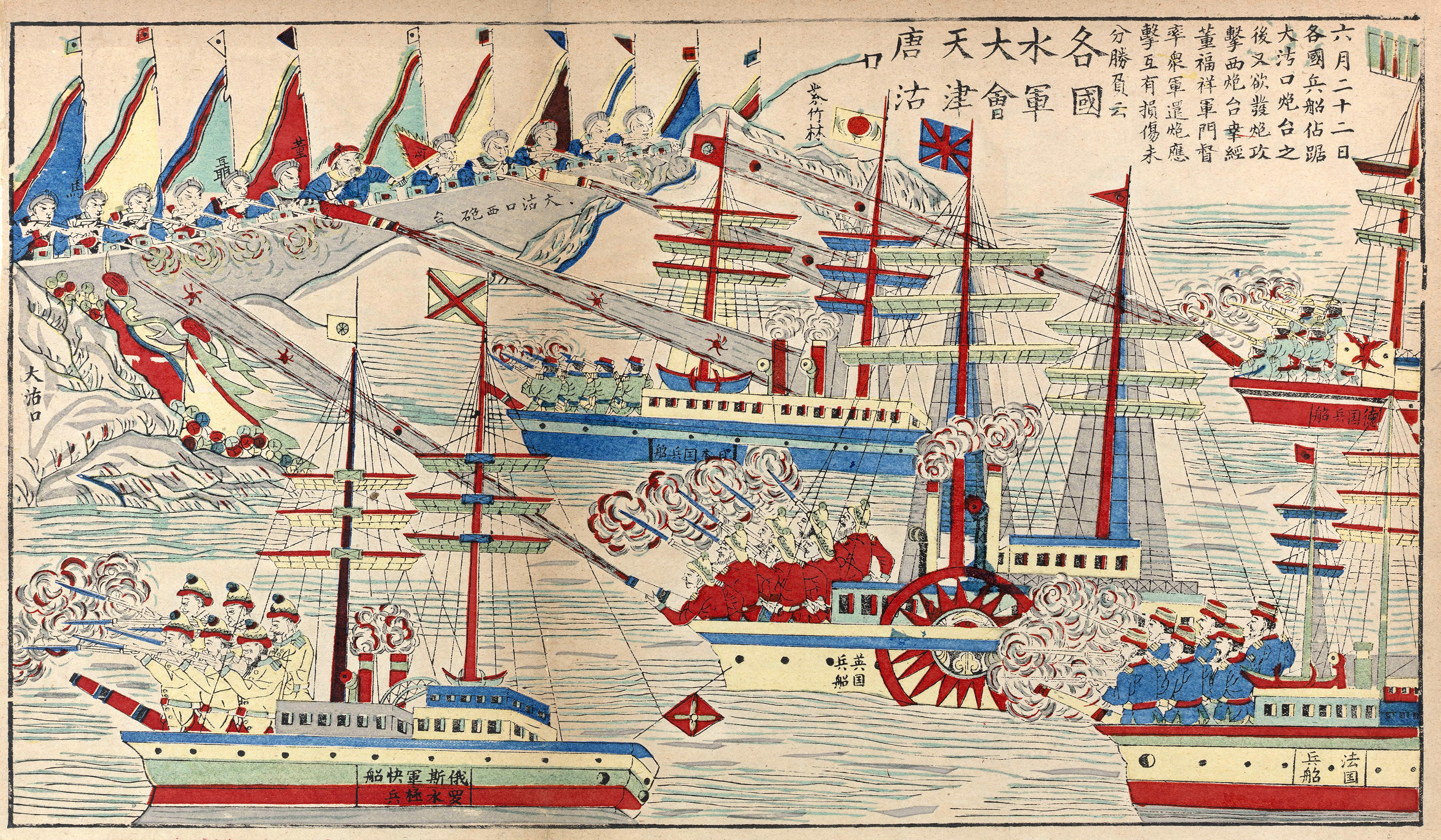
Foreign Powers Attack the Forts at Dagu (June 16–17, 1900). The Chinese New Year's print shows the Chinese defenders firing cannon in a duel with the foreign warships.

The Chinese did not wait for the expiration of the deadline but opened fire from the forts with every single gun at the Allied ships simultaneously at about 00:45 on June 17. The Russian gunboat Korietz was heavily damaged in the opening salvo. The Monocacy, despite its distance from the battle and the assurances of its officers to the 37 women and children aboard that they were “in a position of absolute safety” took a Chinese shell in its bow which hurt nobody. The captain quickly moved the Monocacy to a safer position. Chinese gunnery from the forts aimed at the ships was accurate, also hitting HMS Whiting, SMS Iltis, and Lion and driving Giliak aground. The Russians turned on the searchlight of Giliak, exposing them to Chinese guns. Giliak and another ship were severely damaged. 18 Russians were killed and 65 were wounded.

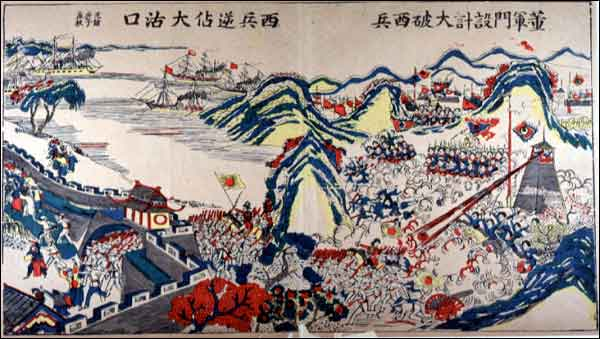
The attack on Taku by the Allies influenced Empress Dowager Cixi's decision to support the Boxers.

The most serious offensive threat to the Allied attack were four modern German-built destroyers lying alongside the dock at Taku. These warships could have easily overpowered the Allied ships, but inexplicably they remained docked even after the Chinese opened fire. Two British destroyers, HMS Whiting and HMS Fame (the former commanded by Lieutenant Colin Mackenzie and the latter by Roger Keyes), each towing a whaleboat with 10 men aboard, darted alongside the Chinese ships and boarded them. The Chinese only offered weak resistance before fleeing and leaving their ships in the hands of the British.

The artillery duel continued inconclusively until nearly dawn, when the Allies stripped their ships of crew and mounted a ground assault on the Northwest Fort. 200 Russians and Austrians led the way followed by 380 British and Italians with 300 Japanese bringing up the rear. In a bit of luck for the allies, the gunpowder magazine exploded just as the ground assault began, and in the confusion afterwards the Japanese stormed the fort. The British and Italians then led the way on the assault of the North Fort, which was soon captured.

Two forts remained on the south side of the river. The Allies turned all their guns, and the guns in the two Chinese forts they had captured, on these two forts. They blew up another powder magazine in one, and shortly afterwards the Chinese soldiers abandoned the forts. The Allied ground force then crossed the river and captured the forts with almost no opposition. The battle of the Taku Forts was over at 6:30 a.m. The Allies had suffered 172 casualties among the 900 soldiers and sailors engaged. The number of Chinese casualties is unknown, but the forts were described as flowing in "rivers of blood". However, Robert B. Edgerton says that Chinese casualties were "probably not heavy".

== Aftermath ==
The attack by the allied navies on the Taku Forts had a profound impact. The first reports of the battle arriving in Beijing from Governor Yu Lu in Tianjin emphasized the positive—and failed to mention to the Empress Dowager Cixi that the allies had captured the forts.

The battle pushed the Qing government definitively to the side of the Boxers, and the Chinese army was instructed to resist foreign military forces on Chinese soil. The next day, June 18, 2,000 allied troops under Edward Seymour were defeated by a Chinese army along the railroad running from Tianjin and Beijing at the Battle of Langfang, and Seymour decided to abandon his objective of reaching Beijing and retreated to Tianjin. On June 19, a Chinese ultimatum was delivered to the diplomats in the Legation Quarter in Beijing informing them that they had 24 hours to depart the capital. When the foreigners refused to leave, fearing for their safety, the Siege of the Legations began on June 20. The Taku forts remained in foreign hands for the remainder of the Boxer Rebellion.

Allied officers praised the courage and skill the Chinese had demonstrated in defending the Taku Forts.

== In popular culture ==
- The same year, Thomas A. Edison, Inc. debuted a short documentary film, Bombardment of Taku Forts by the Allied fleets (1900), which recreated the events in miniature.
