= HMS Fervent =

Three ships of the Royal Navy have been named HMS Fervent, with a further ship unbuilt:

- HMS Fervent (1804), built in 1804, was an Archer-class gunbrig, which was converted to a mooring lighter in 1816 and broken up in 1879.
- A wooden screw frigate was ordered from Woolwich Dockyard as HMS Fervent in 1846 but was cancelled in 1849.
- HMS Fervent (1856) was a Albacore-class gunboat built in 1856 and broken up in 1879.
- HMS Fervent (1895) was a Fervent-class destroyer launched in 1895 and sold for scrap in 1920.
- HMS Fervent, Royal Naval shore base and headquarters in Ramsgate, Kent, 1939–1945.
