= List of Scottish statutory instruments, 2010 =

This is a complete list of Scottish statutory instruments in 2010.

== 1-100 ==
- The National Health Service (Charges for Drugs and Appliances) (Scotland) Amendment Regulations 2010 (S.S.I. 2010 No. 1)
- The Homeless Persons (Provision of Non-permanent Accommodation) (Scotland) Regulations 2010 (S.S.I. 2010 No. 2)
- The A96 Trunk Road (Fochabers to Mosstodloch Bypass) (Temporary Prohibition of Traffic, Temporary Prohibition of Overtaking, Temporary Prohibition of Waiting and Loading and Temporary Speed Restriction) Order 2010 (S.S.I. 2010 No. 3)
- The Wild Birds (Special Protection in Severe Weather) (Scotland) Order 2010 (S.S.I. 2010 No. 4)
- The Official Feed and Food Controls (Scotland) Amendment Regulations 2010 (S.S.I. 2010 No. 5)
- The A92/A972 Trunk Road (South Marketgait, Dundee) (Detrunking) Order 2010 (S.S.I. 2010 No. 6)
- Act of Sederunt (Registration Appeal Court) 2010 (S.S.I. 2010 No. 7)
- The Snares (Scotland) Order 2010 (S.S.I. 2010 No. 8)
- The Sea Fish (Prohibited Methods of Fishing) (Firth of Clyde) Order 2010 (S.S.I. 2010 No. 9)
- The Water Services Charges (Billing and Collection) (Scotland) Order 2010 (S.S.I. 2010 No. 10)
- The South West Unit Trunk Roads Area (Temporary Prohibitions of Traffic, Temporary Prohibitions of Overtaking and Temporary Speed Restrictions) Order 2010 (S.S.I. 2010 No. 11)
- The South East Unit Trunk Roads Area (Temporary Prohibitions of Traffic, Temporary Prohibitions of Overtaking and Temporary Speed Restrictions) Order 2010 (S.S.I. 2010 No. 12)
- The North West Unit Trunk Roads Area (Temporary Prohibitions of Traffic, Temporary Prohibitions of Overtaking and Temporary Speed Restrictions) Order 2010 (S.S.I. 2010 No. 13)
- The North East Unit Trunk Roads Area (Temporary Prohibitions of Traffic, Temporary Prohibitions of Overtaking and Temporary Speed Restrictions) Order 2010 (S.S.I. 2010 No. 14)
- The Justice of the Peace Courts (Sheriffdom of South Strathclyde, Dumfries and Galloway) etc. Amendment Order 2010 (S.S.I. 2010 No. 15)
- Act of Sederunt (Rules of the Court of Session Amendment) (Transfer of Functions of the Asylum and Immigration Tribunal Order 2010) 2010 (S.S.I. 2010 No. 16)
- The A82 Trunk Road (Ba Bridge, Blackmount) (Temporary Prohibition of Traffic and Temporary Speed Restriction) Order 2010 (S.S.I. 2010 No. 17)
- The A95 Trunk Road (Lackghie Improvement) Order 2010 (S.S.I. 2010 No. 18)
- The A95 Trunk Road (Lackghie Improvement) (Side Roads) Order 2010 (S.S.I. 2010 No. 19)
- The M9/A9 Trunk Road (Helmsdale) (30 mph Speed Limit and Helmsdale Primary School Part-time 20 mph Speed Limit) Order 2010 (S.S.I. 2010 No. 20)
- The Adoption and Children (Scotland) Act 2007 (Modification of Enactments) Order 2010 (S.S.I. 2010 No. 21)
- The National Health Service (Superannuation Scheme, Pension Scheme, Injury Benefits and Additional Voluntary Contributions) (Scotland) Amendment Regulations 2010 (S.S.I. 2010 No. 22)
- The Scottish Road Works Register (Prescribed Fees) Regulations 2010 (S.S.I. 2010 No. 23)
- The A82 Trunk Road (Stuckindroin Bridge) (Temporary Prohibition of Traffic) Order 2010 (S.S.I. 2010 No. 24)
- The M8 Motorway (Junction 21, Carnoustie Street) (Temporary Prohibition of Traffic) Order 2010 (S.S.I. 2010 No. 25)
- The Food Enzymes (Scotland) Amendment Regulations 2010 (S.S.I. 2010 No. 26)
- The Town and Country Planning (General Permitted Development) (Domestic Microgeneration) (Scotland) Amendment Order 2010 (S.S.I. 2010 No. 27)
- The National Health Service (Appointment of Consultants) (Scotland) Amendment Regulations 2010 (S.S.I. 2010 No. 28)
- The Crofting (Designation of Areas) (Scotland) Order 2010 (S.S.I. 2010 No. 29)
- Act of Sederunt (Rules of the Court of Session Amendment No. 2) (Causes in the Inner House) 2010 (S.S.I. 2010 No. 30)
- The Loch Ryan Port (Harbour Empowerment) Order 2010 (S.S.I. 2010 No. 31)
- The Building (Scotland) Amendment Regulations 2010 (S.S.I. 2010 No. 32)
- The National Health Service (General Dental Services) (Scotland) Amendment Regulations 2010 (S.S.I. 2010 No. 33)
- The Local Government Pension Reserve Fund (Scotland) Amendment Regulations 2010 (S.S.I. 2010 No. 34)
- The Council Tax (Dwellings) (Scotland) Regulations 2010 (S.S.I. 2010 No. 35)
- The Non-Domestic Rate (Scotland) Order 2010 (S.S.I. 2010 No. 36)
- The Non-Domestic Rating (Rural Areas and Rateable Value Limits) (Scotland) Amendment Order 2010 (S.S.I. 2010 No. 37)
- The Non-Domestic Rating (Valuation of Utilities) (Scotland) Amendment Order 2010 (S.S.I. 2010 No. 38)
- The Judiciary and Courts (Scotland) Act 2008 (Commencement No. 4, Transitional Provisions and Savings) Order 2010 (S.S.I. 2010 No. 39 (C. 1))
- The Transfer of Property etc. (Scottish Court Service) Order 2010 (S.S.I. 2010 No. 40)
- The Scottish Court Service (Corporate Plan) Order 2010 (S.S.I. 2010 No. 41)
- The Personal Injuries (NHS Charges) (Amounts) (Scotland) Amendment Regulations 2010 (S.S.I. 2010 No. 42)
- The Non-Domestic Rates (Levying) (Scotland) Regulations 2010 (S.S.I. 2010 No. 43)
- The Non-Domestic Rates (Renewable Energy Generation Relief) (Scotland) Regulations 2010 (S.S.I. 2010 No. 44)
- The Local Government (Allowances and Expenses) (Scotland) Amendment Regulations 2010 (S.S.I. 2010 No. 45)
- The Local Government Finance (Scotland) Order 2010 (S.S.I. 2010 No. 46)
- The A75 Trunk Road (Cairntop to Barlae Improvement) (Temporary 40 mph Speed Restriction) Order 2010 (S.S.I. 2010 No. 47)
- The Food for Particular Nutritional Uses (Miscellaneous Amendments) (Scotland) Regulations 2010 (S.S.I. 2010 No. 48)
- The Town and Country Planning (Limit of Annual Value) (Scotland) Order 2010 (S.S.I. 2010 No. 49)
- The Public Appointments and Public Bodies etc. (Scotland) Act 2003 (Amendment of Specified Authorities) Order 2010 (S.S.I. 2010 No. 50)
- The M73 Trunk Road (Mollinsburn to Gartcosh) (Temporary 40 mph Speed Limit) Order 2010 (S.S.I. 2010 No. 51)
- The South West Unit Trunk Roads Area (Temporary Prohibitions of Traffic, Temporary Prohibitions of Overtaking and Temporary Speed Restrictions) (No.2) Order 2010 (S.S.I. 2010 No. 52)
- The South East Unit Trunk Roads Area (Temporary Prohibitions of Traffic, Temporary Prohibitions of Overtaking and Temporary Speed Restrictions) (No.2) Order 2010 (S.S.I. 2010 No. 53)
- The North West Unit Trunk Roads Area (Temporary Prohibitions of Traffic, Temporary Prohibitions of Overtaking and Temporary Speed Restrictions) (No.2) Order 2010 (S.S.I. 2010 No. 54)
- The North East Unit Trunk Roads Area (Temporary Prohibitions of Traffic, Temporary Prohibitions of Overtaking and Temporary Speed Restrictions) (No.2) Order 2010 (S.S.I. 2010 No. 55)
- The M90/A90 Trunk Road (Spittalburn to Southbank) (Redetermination of Means of Exercise of Public Right of Passage) Order 2010 (S.S.I. 2010 No. 56)
- The Advice and Assistance and Civil Legal Aid (Priority of Debts) (Scotland) Regulations 2010 (S.S.I. 2010 No. 57)
- The Health Board Elections (Scotland) Amendment Regulations 2010 (S.S.I. 2010 No. 58)
- The Refuges for Children (Scotland) Amendment Regulations 2010 (S.S.I. 2010 No. 59)
- The Management of Extractive Waste (Scotland) Regulations 2010 (S.S.I. 2010 No. 60)
- The Town and Country Planning (Prescribed Date) (Scotland) Amendment Regulations 2010 (S.S.I. 2010 No. 61)
- The Housing Revenue Account General Fund Contribution Limits (Scotland) Order 2010 (S.S.I. 2010 No. 62)
- The Criminal Legal Aid (Scotland) (Fees) Amendment Regulations 2010 (S.S.I. 2010 No. 63)
- The Police Grant (Scotland) Order 2010 (S.S.I. 2010 No. 64)
- The Firefighters’ Pension Scheme (Scotland) Order 2007 Amendment Order 2010 (S.S.I. 2010 No. 65)
- The Firefighters’ Pension Scheme Amendment (Scotland) Order 2010 (S.S.I. 2010 No. 66)
- The Beet Seed (Scotland) Regulations 2010 (S.S.I. 2010 No. 67)
- The Road Works (Inspection Fees) (Scotland) Amendment Regulations 2010 (S.S.I. 2010 No. 68)
- The Food Hygiene (Scotland) Amendment Regulations 2010 (S.S.I. 2010 No. 69)
- The Schools (Consultation) (Scotland) Act 2010 (Commencement) Order 2010 (S.S.I. 2010 No. 70 (C. 2))
- The Seed Potatoes (Scotland) Amendment Regulations 2010 (S.S.I. 2010 No. 71)
- The Recovery of Expenditure for the Provision of Social Care Services (Scotland) Regulations 2010 (S.S.I. 2010 No. 72)
- The National Assistance (Assessment of Resources) Amendment (Scotland) Regulations 2010 (S.S.I. 2010 No. 73)
- The National Assistance (Sums for Personal Requirements) (Scotland) Regulations 2010 (S.S.I. 2010 No. 74)
- The A9 Trunk Road (Aberuthven to Abbey Bridge) (Temporary Prohibition of Specified Turns) Order 2010 (S.S.I. 2010 No. 75)
- The Bankruptcy Fees (Scotland) Amendment Regulations 2010 (S.S.I. 2010 No. 76)
- The Tobacco and Primary Medical Services (Scotland) Act 2010 (Ancillary Provisions) Order 2010 (S.S.I. 2010 No. 77)
- The Non-Domestic Rating (Valuation of Utilities) (Scotland) Amendment (No. 2) Order 2010 (S.S.I. 2010 No. 78)
- The A90 (Aberdeen Western Peripheral Route) Special Road Scheme 2010 (S.S.I. 2010 No. 79)
- The A90 (Aberdeen Western Peripheral Route) Trunk Road Order 2010 (S.S.I. 2010 No. 80)
- The A90 (Aberdeen Western Peripheral Route) (Craibstone Junction) Special Road Scheme 2010 (S.S.I. 2010 No. 81)
- The A96 (Aberdeen Western Peripheral Route) Trunk Road Order 2010 (S.S.I. 2010 No. 82)
- The A956 (Aberdeen Western Peripheral Route) Special Road Scheme 2010 (S.S.I. 2010 No. 83)
- The A956 (Aberdeen Western Peripheral Route) Trunk Road Order 2010 (S.S.I. 2010 No. 84)
- The Police Pensions Amendment (Scotland) Regulations 2010 (S.S.I. 2010 No. 85)
- The National Health Service (General Ophthalmic Services) (Scotland) Amendment Regulations 2010 (S.S.I. 2010 No. 86)
- The Rural Development Contracts (Rural Priorities) (Scotland) Amendment Regulations 2010 (S.S.I. 2010 No. 87)
- The Zoonoses and Animal By-Products (Fees) (Scotland) Amendment Regulations 2010 (S.S.I. 2010 No. 88)
- The Natural Mineral Water, Spring Water and Bottled Drinking Water (Scotland) Amendment Regulations 2010 (S.S.I. 2010 No. 89)
- The Fish Labelling (Scotland) Regulations 2010 (S.S.I. 2010 No. 90)
- The A90 Trunk Road (Walnut Grove) (Temporary Prohibition of Specified Turns) Order 2010 (S.S.I. 2010 No. 91)
- The Registration Services (Fees, etc.) (Scotland) Amendment Regulations 2010 (S.S.I. 2010 No. 92)
- The National Health Service (General Medical Services Contracts, Primary Medical Services Section 17C Agreements and Primary Medical Services Performers Lists) (Scotland) Amendment Regulations 2010 (S.S.I. 2010 No. 93)
- The National Health Service (Travelling Expenses and Remission of Charges) (Scotland) Amendment Regulations 2010 (S.S.I. 2010 No. 94)
- The Water Quality (Scotland) Regulations 2010 (S.S.I. 2010 No. 95)
- The Road Traffic (Permitted Parking Area and Special Parking Area) (Renfrewshire Council) Designation Order 2010 (S.S.I. 2010 No. 96)
- The Parking Attendants (Wearing of Uniforms) (Renfrewshire Council Parking Area) Regulations 2010 (S.S.I. 2010 No. 97)
- The Road Traffic (Parking Adjudicators) (Renfrewshire Council) Regulations 2010 (S.S.I. 2010 No. 98)
- The Plant Health (Potatoes) (Scotland) Amendment Order 2010 (S.S.I. 2010 No. 99)
- The Sea Fishing (Transitional EU Technical Conservation Measures) (Scotland) Order 2010 (S.S.I. 2010 No. 100)

== 101-200 ==
- The A90 Trunk Road (Charleston to Blackdog) Detrunking Order 2010 (S.S.I. 2010 No. 101)
- The A96 Trunk Road (Dyce Drive to Haudagain Roundabout) Detrunking Order 2010 (S.S.I. 2010 No. 102)
- The A96 Trunk Road (Dyce Drive Roundabout to Craibstone) Detrunking Order 2010 (S.S.I. 2010 No. 103)
- The A90 (Aberdeen Western Peripheral Route) Special Road (Side Roads) Order 2010 (S.S.I. 2010 No. 104)
- The A956 (Aberdeen Western Peripheral Route) Special Road (Side Roads) Order 2010 (S.S.I. 2010 No. 105)
- The A90 (Aberdeen Western Peripheral Route) Trunk Road (Side Roads) Order 2010 (S.S.I. 2010 No. 106)
- The A956 (Aberdeen Western Peripheral Route) Trunk Road (Side Roads) Order 2010 (S.S.I. 2010 No. 107)
- The A96 (Aberdeen Western Peripheral Route) Trunk Road (Side Roads) Order 2010 (S.S.I. 2010 No. 108)
- The A90 (Aberdeen Western Peripheral Route) Special Road (Redetermination of Means of Exercise of Public Right of Passage) Order 2010 (S.S.I. 2010 No. 109)
- The Home Energy Assistance Scheme (Scotland) Amendment Regulations 2010 (S.S.I. 2010 No. 110)
- The Local Government (Allowances and Expenses) (Scotland) Amendment (No. 2) Regulations 2010 (S.S.I. 2010 No. 111)
- The A702 Trunk Road (Biggar) (40 mph and 30 mph Speed Limit) and Biggar High School and Biggar Primary School (Part-time 20 mph Speed Limit) Variation and Revocation Order 2010 (S.S.I. 2010 No. 112)
- The A9 Trunk Road (Moy) (Temporary Prohibition of Traffic, Temporary Prohibition of Overtaking and Temporary Speed Restriction) Order 2010 (S.S.I. 2010 No. 113)
- The Housing (Scotland) Act 2006 (Commencement No. 7, Savings and Transitional Provisions) Amendment Order 2010 (S.S.I. 2010 No. 114)
- The Offences (Aggravation by Prejudice) (Scotland) Act 2009 (Commencement) Order 2010 (S.S.I. 2010 No. 115 (C. 3))
- The Housing Support Grant (Scotland) Order 2010 (S.S.I. 2010 No. 116)
- The Community Care (Personal Care and Nursing Care) (Scotland) Amendment Regulations 2010 (S.S.I. 2010 No. 117)
- The Budget (Scotland) Act 2009 Amendment Order 2010 (S.S.I. 2010 No. 118)
- The Local Government in Scotland Act 2003 (Commencement No. 5 and Saving) Order 2010 (S.S.I. 2010 No. 119 (C. 4))
- Act of Sederunt (Ordinary Cause Rules) Amendment (Child Maintenance and Other Payments Act 2008) 2010 (S.S.I. 2010 No. 120)
- The Public Appointments and Public Bodies etc. (Scotland) Act 2003 (Treatment of Office or Body as Specified Authority) Order 2010 (S.S.I. 2010 No. 121)
- The Local Government Investments (Scotland) Regulations 2010 (S.S.I. 2010 No. 122)
- The South West Unit Trunk Roads Area (Temporary Prohibitions of Traffic, Temporary Prohibitions of Overtaking and Temporary Speed Restrictions) (No.3) Order 2010 (S.S.I. 2010 No. 123)
- The South East Unit Trunk Roads Area (Temporary Prohibitions of Traffic, Temporary Prohibitions of Overtaking and Temporary Speed Restrictions) (No.3) Order 2010 (S.S.I. 2010 No. 124)
- The North West Unit Trunk Roads Area (Temporary Prohibitions of Traffic, Temporary Prohibitions of Overtaking and Temporary Speed Restrictions) (No. 3) Order 2010 (S.S.I. 2010 No. 125)
- The North East Unit Trunk Roads Area (Temporary Prohibitions of Traffic, Temporary Prohibitions of Overtaking and Temporary Speed Restrictions) (No.3) Order 2010 (S.S.I. 2010 No. 126)
- The Natural Mineral Water, Spring Water and Bottled Drinking Water (Scotland) Amendment (No. 2) Regulations 2010 (S.S.I. 2010 No. 127)
- The National Health Service (Pharmaceutical Services) (Scotland) Amendment Regulations 2010 (S.S.I. 2010 No. 128)
- The Education (Additional Support for Learning) (Scotland) Act 2009 (Commencement No. 1) Order 2010 (S.S.I. 2010 No. 129 (C. 5))
- The Special Restrictions on Adoptions from Nepal (Scotland) Order 2010 (S.S.I. 2010 No. 130)
- The Pollution Prevention and Control (Designation of Directives) (Scotland) Order 2010 (S.S.I. 2010 No. 131)
- The Scottish Local Government (Elections) Act 2009 (Commencement) Order 2010 (S.S.I. 2010 No. 132 (C. 6))
- The Protection of Vulnerable Groups (Scotland) Act 2007 (Commencement No. 3) Order 2010 (S.S.I. 2010 No. 133 (C. 7))
- The A90 Trunk Road (North Cammachmore Junction) (Temporary Prohibition of Specified Turns) Order 2010 (S.S.I. 2010 No. 134)
- The A76 Trunk Road (Glenairlie Improvement) (Temporary Prohibition of Traffic, Temporary Prohibition of Overtaking and Temporary Speed Restriction) Order 2010 (S.S.I. 2010 No. 135)
- Act of Sederunt (Rules of the Court of Session Amendment No. 3) (Miscellaneous) 2010 (S.S.I. 2010 No. 136)
- Act of Sederunt (Child Care and Maintenance Rules) Amendment (Human Fertilisation and Embryology Act 2008) 2010 (S.S.I. 2010 No. 137)
- The A828 Trunk Road (Kentallen) (40 mph and 50 mph Speed Limits) Order 2010 (S.S.I. 2010 No. 138)
- The Advice and Assistance and Civil Legal Aid (Financial Conditions and Contributions) (Scotland) Regulations 2010 (S.S.I. 2010 No. 139)
- The National Bus Travel Concession Scheme for Older and Disabled Persons (Scotland) Amendment Order 2010 (S.S.I. 2010 No. 140)
- The Town and Country Planning (Fees for Applications and Deemed Applications) (Scotland) Amendment Regulations 2010 (S.S.I. 2010 No. 141)
- The Stipendiary Magistrates (Scotland) Order 2010 (S.S.I. 2010 No. 142)
- The Additional Support for Learning (Appropriate Agencies) (Scotland) Amendment Order 2010 (S.S.I. 2010 No. 143)
- The Additional Support for Learning Dispute Resolution (Scotland) Amendment Regulations 2010 (S.S.I. 2010 No. 144)
- The Additional Support for Learning (Sources of Information) (Scotland) Order 2010 (S.S.I. 2010 No. 145)
- The M9/A9 Trunk Road (Olrig Street, Traill Street & Sir George's Street, Thurso) (Prohibition of Waiting and Loading) (No 2) Order 2010 (S.S.I. 2010 No. 146)
- The Renewables Obligation (Scotland) Amendment Order 2010 (S.S.I. 2010 No. 147)
- The Beet Seed (Scotland) (No. 2) Regulations 2010 (S.S.I. 2010 No. 148)
- The Additional Support for Learning (Co-ordinated Support Plan) (Scotland) Amendment Regulations 2010 (S.S.I. 2010 No. 149)
- The Poultry Compartments (Scotland) Order 2010 (S.S.I. 2010 No. 150)
- The Poultry Compartments (Fees) (Scotland) Order 2010 (S.S.I. 2010 No. 151)
- The Additional Support Needs Tribunals for Scotland (Practice and Procedure) Amendment Rules 2010 (S.S.I. 2010 No. 152)
- The Guar Gum (Restriction on First Placing on the Market) (Scotland) Revocation Regulations 2010 (S.S.I. 2010 No. 153)
- The Local Government Finance (Scotland) Amendment Order 2010 (S.S.I. 2010 No. 154)
- The South West Unit Trunk Roads Area (Temporary Prohibitions of Traffic, Temporary Prohibitions of Overtaking and Temporary Speed Restrictions) (No.4) Order 2010 (S.S.I. 2010 No. 155)
- The South East Unit Trunk Roads Area (Temporary Prohibitions of Traffic, Temporary Prohibitions of Overtaking and Temporary Speed Restrictions) (No.4) Order 2010 (S.S.I. 2010 No. 156)
- The North East Unit Trunk Roads Area (Temporary Prohibitions of Traffic, Temporary Prohibitions of Overtaking and Temporary Speed Restrictions) (No. 4) Order 2010 (S.S.I. 2010 No. 157)
- The North West Unit Trunk Roads Area (Temporary Prohibitions of Traffic, Temporary Prohibitions of Overtaking and Temporary Speed Restrictions) (No.4) Order 2010 (S.S.I. 2010 No. 158)
- The Housing (Scotland) Act 2006 (Commencement No. 8, Transitional Provisions and Savings) Order 2010 (S.S.I. 2010 No. 159 (C. 8))
- The Disposal of Land by Local Authorities (Scotland) Regulations 2010 (S.S.I. 2010 No. 160)
- The Protection of Vulnerable Groups (Scotland) Act 2007 (Prescribed Services) (Protected Adults) Regulations 2010 (S.S.I. 2010 No. 161)
- The M8/A8 Trunk Road (James Watt Dock Access, East Hamilton Street, Greenock) (Temporary Prohibition of Specified Turns) Order 2010 (S.S.I. 2010 No. 162)
- The M80/A80 Trunk Road (Robroyston to Bankhead) (Temporary 40 mph Speed Restriction) Order 2010 (S.S.I. 2010 No. 163)
- The Parole Board (Scotland) Amendment Rules 2010 (S.S.I. 2010 No. 164)
- The Victims’ Rights (Prescribed Bodies) (Scotland) Order 2010 (S.S.I. 2010 No. 165)
- The Advice and Assistance and Civil Legal Aid (Transfer of Tribunal Functions) (No. 1) (Scotland) Regulations 2010 (S.S.I. 2010 No. 166)
- The Protection of Vulnerable Groups (Scotland) Act 2007 (Fees for Scheme Membership and Disclosure Requests) Regulations 2010 (S.S.I. 2010 No. 167)
- The Police Act 1997 (Criminal Records) (Scotland) Regulations 2010 (S.S.I. 2010 No. 168)
- The A96 Trunk Road (Threapland Junction Improvements) (Redetermination of Means of Exercise of Public Right of Passage) Order 2010 (S.S.I. 2010 No. 169)
- The A96 Trunk Road (Threapland Junction Improvements) (Side Roads) Order 2010 (S.S.I. 2010 No. 170)
- The Town and Country Planning (Hazardous Substances) (Scotland) Amendment Regulations 2010 (S.S.I. 2010 No. 171)
- The Adoption Agencies (Scotland) Amendment Regulations 2010 (S.S.I. 2010 No. 172)
- The Adoptions with a Foreign Element (Scotland) Amendment Regulations 2010 (S.S.I. 2010 No. 173)
- The A84 Trunk Road (Kilmahog – Callander) Trunk Road (Temporary Prohibition of Traffic, Temporary Prohibition of Overtaking and Temporary Speed Restriction) Order 2010 (S.S.I. 2010 No. 174)
- The A82 Trunk Road (Carrs Corner to Fort William) (30 mph and 40 mph Speed Limits) Order 2010 (S.S.I. 2010 No. 175)
- The A82 Trunk Road (Fort William Relief Road) (Clearway) Order 2010 (S.S.I. 2010 No. 176)
- The Transmissible Spongiform Encephalopathies (Scotland) Regulations 2010 (S.S.I. 2010 No. 177)
- The Protection of Vulnerable Groups (Scotland) Act 2007 (Power to Refer) (Information Relevant to Listing Decisions) Order 2010 (S.S.I. 2010 No. 178)
- The Protection of Vulnerable Groups (Scotland) Act 2007 (Applications for Removal from List and Late Representations) Regulations 2010 (S.S.I. 2010 No. 179)
- The Protection of Vulnerable Groups (Scotland) Act 2007 (Savings and Transitional Provisions) Order 2010 (S.S.I. 2010 No. 180)
- The Protection of Vulnerable Groups (Scotland) Act 2007 (Referrals by Organisations and Other Bodies) (Prescribed Information) Regulations 2010 (S.S.I. 2010 No. 181)
- The Protection of Vulnerable Groups (Scotland) Act 2007 (Referrals by Courts) (Prescribed Information) Regulations 2010 (S.S.I. 2010 No. 182)
- The Protection of Vulnerable Groups (Scotland) Act 2007 (Consideration for Listing) Regulations 2010 (S.S.I. 2010 No. 183)
- Act of Adjournal (Criminal Procedure Rules Amendment) (Miscellaneous) 2010 (S.S.I. 2010 No. 184)
- The Smoking, Health and Social Care (Scotland) Act 2005 (Commencement No. 6) Order 2010 (S.S.I. 2010 No. 185 (C. 9))
- The International Organisations (Immunities and Privileges) (Scotland) Amendment Order 2010 (S.S.I. 2010 No. 186)
- The Census (Scotland) Order 2010 (S.S.I. 2010 No. 187)
- The Network Rail (Waverley Steps) Order 2010 (S.S.I. 2010 No. 188)
- The Protection of Vulnerable Groups (Scotland) Act 2007 (Vetting Information) Regulations 2010 (S.S.I. 2010 No. 189)
- The Police Act 1997 (Alteration of the Meaning of Suitability Information relating to Children and Protected Adults) (Scotland) Order 2010 (S.S.I. 2010 No. 190)
- The Protection of Vulnerable Groups (Scotland) Act 2007 (Health Professionals) (Health Service Lists) Regulations 2010 (S.S.I. 2010 No. 191)
- The Protection of Vulnerable Groups (Scotland) Act 2007 (Prescribed Manner and Place for the Taking of Fingerprints and Prescribed Personal Data Holders) Regulations 2010 (S.S.I. 2010 No. 192)
- The Protection of Vulnerable Groups (Scotland) Act 2007 (Administration of the Scheme) Regulations 2010 (S.S.I. 2010 No. 193)
- The Protection of Vulnerable Groups (Scotland) Act 2007 (Unlawful Requests for Scheme Records) (Prescribed Circumstances) Regulations 2010 (S.S.I. 2010 No. 194)
- The Arbitration (Scotland) Act 2010 (Commencement No. 1 and Transitional Provisions) Order 2010 (S.S.I. 2010 No. 195 (C. 10))
- The Arbitral Appointments Referee (Scotland) Order 2010 (S.S.I. 2010 No. 196)
- The M90/A90 Trunk Road (Kinfauns Castle to Glencarse) (Temporary Prohibition of Specified Turns) Order 2010 (S.S.I. 2010 No. 197)
- The Glasgow Caledonian University Order of Council 2010 (S.S.I. 2010 No. 198)
- The Sports Grounds and Sporting Events (Designation) (Scotland) Order 2010 (S.S.I. 2010 No. 199)
- The South West Unit Trunk Roads Area (Temporary Prohibitions of Traffic, Temporary Prohibitions of Overtaking and Temporary Speed Restrictions) (No.5) Order 2010 (S.S.I. 2010 No. 200)

== 201-300 ==
- The South East Unit Trunk Roads Area (Temporary Prohibitions of Traffic, Temporary Prohibitions of Overtaking and Temporary Speed Restrictions) (No.5) Order 2010 (S.S.I. 2010 No. 201)
- The North West Unit Trunk Roads Area (Temporary Prohibitions of Traffic, Temporary Prohibitions of Overtaking and Temporary Speed Restrictions) (No.5) Order 2010 (S.S.I. 2010 No. 202)
- The North East Unit Trunk Roads Area (Temporary Prohibitions of Traffic, Temporary Prohibitions of Overtaking and Temporary Speed Restrictions) (No. 5) Order 2010 (S.S.I. 2010 No. 203)
- The Air Quality Standards (Scotland) Regulations 2010 (S.S.I. 2010 No. 204)
- Act of Sederunt (Rules of the Court of Session Amendment No. 4) (Miscellaneous) 2010 (S.S.I. 2010 No. 205)
- The Plant Health (Scotland) Amendment Order 2010 (S.S.I. 2010 No. 206)
- The Plant Health Fees (Scotland) Amendment Regulations 2010 (S.S.I. 2010 No. 207)
- The National Health Service (General Dental Services) (Scotland) Regulations 2010 (S.S.I. 2010 No. 208)
- The A85 Trunk Road (Connel) (40 mph Speed Limit) Order 2010 (S.S.I. 2010 No. 209)
- The M90/A90 Trunk Road (Walker Drive, Muchalls) (Prohibition of Specified Turns) Order 2010 (S.S.I. 2010 No. 210)
- The Census (Scotland) Regulations 2010 (S.S.I. 2010 No. 211)
- The Criminal Legal Aid (Scotland) (Fees) Amendment (No. 2) Regulations 2010 (S.S.I. 2010 No. 212)
- The Parental Responsibility and Measures for the Protection of Children (International Obligations) (Scotland) Regulations 2010 (S.S.I. 2010 No. 213)
- The Knives etc. (Disposal of Forfeited Property) (Scotland) Order 2010 (S.S.I. 2010 No. 214)
- The Census (Scotland) Amendment Regulations 2010 (S.S.I. 2010 No. 215)
- The Carbon Accounting Scheme (Scotland) Regulations 2010 (S.S.I. 2010 No. 216)
- Climate Change (Limit on Carbon Units) (Scotland) Order 2010 (SSI 2010/217)
- Climate Change (International Aviation and Shipping) (Scotland) Order 2010 (SSI 2010/218)
- The Seed (Scotland) (Miscellaneous Amendments) Regulations 2010 (S.S.I. 2010 No. 219)
- The Arbitration (Scotland) Act 2010 (Consequential Amendments) Order 2010 (S.S.I. 2010 No. 220)
- The Public Services Reform (Scotland) Act 2010 (Commencement No. 1) Order 2010 (S.S.I. 2010 No. 221 (C. 11))
- The Public Services Reform (Scotland) Act 2010 (Consequential Modifications) Order 2010 (S.S.I. 2010 No. 222)
- The National Lottery etc. Act 1993 (Amendment of Section 23) (Creative Scotland) Order 2010 (S.S.I. 2010 No. 223)
- The Scottish Social Services Council (Appointments, Procedure and Access to the Register) Amendment Regulations 2010 (S.S.I. 2010 No. 224)
- The Products of Animal Origin (Third Country Imports) (Scotland) Amendment Regulations 2010 (S.S.I. 2010 No. 225)
- The National Health Service (Discipline Committees) (Scotland) Amendment Regulations 2010 (S.S.I. 2010 No. 226)
- The National Health Service (Tribunal) (Scotland) Amendment Regulations 2010 (S.S.I. 2010 No. 227)
- The Scottish Dental Practice Board Amendment Regulations 2010 (S.S.I. 2010 No. 228)
- The National Health Service (Vocational Training for General Dental Practice) (Scotland) Amendment Regulations 2010 (S.S.I. 2010 No. 229)
- The Marine (Scotland) Act 2010 (Commencement No. 1) Order 2010 (S.S.I. 2010 No. 230 (C. 12))
- The Sea Fish (Specified Sea Areas) (Regulation of Nets and Other Fishing Gear) (Scotland) Amendment Order 2010 (S.S.I. 2010 No. 231)
- The Police Pension Account (Scotland) Regulations 2010 (S.S.I. 2010 No. 232)
- The Local Government Pension Scheme (Management and Investment of Funds) (Scotland) Regulations 2010 (S.S.I. 2010 No. 233)
- The Local Government Pension Scheme Amendment (Scotland) Regulations 2010 (S.S.I. 2010 No. 234)
- The Pollution Prevention and Control (Designation of Classification of Substances and Mixtures Directive) (Scotland) Order 2010 (S.S.I. 2010 No. 235)
- The Solvent Emissions (Scotland) Regulations 2010 (S.S.I. 2010 No. 236)
- The Criminal Legal Aid (Fixed Payments) (Scotland) Amendment Regulations 2010 (S.S.I. 2010 No. 237)
- The Sea Fishing (Restriction on Days at Sea) (Scotland) Order 2010 (S.S.I. 2010 No. 238)
- The Advice and Assistance and Civil Legal Aid (Transfer of Tribunal Functions) (No. 2) (Scotland) Regulations 2010 (S.S.I. 2010 No. 239)
- The Protection of Vulnerable Groups (Scotland) Act 2007 (Modification of Regulated Work with Children) Order 2010 (S.S.I. 2010 No. 240)
- The Protection of Vulnerable Groups (Scotland) Act 2007 (Automatic Listing) (Specified Criteria) Order 2010 (S.S.I. 2010 No. 241)
- The A725/A726 Trunk Road (Peel Park) (Temporary Prohibition of Traffic) Order 2010 (S.S.I. 2010 No. 242)
- The Rehabilitation of Offenders Act 1974 (Exclusions and Exceptions) (Scotland) Amendment Order 2010 (S.S.I. 2010 No. 243)
- The Protection of Vulnerable Groups (Scotland) Act 2007 (Removal of Barred Individuals from Regulated Work) Regulations 2010 (S.S.I. 2010 No. 244)
- The Protection of Vulnerable Groups (Scotland) Act 2007 (Modification of Regulated Work with Adults) Order 2010 (S.S.I. 2010 No. 245)
- The Protection of Vulnerable Groups (Scotland) Act 2007 (Relevant Offences) (Modification) Order 2010 (S.S.I. 2010 No. 246)
- The A90 Trunk Road (Charlestown to Portlethen) (Temporary Prohibition of Specified Turns) Order 2010 (S.S.I. 2010 No. 247)
- The Rice Products from the United States of America (Restriction on First Placing on the Market) (Scotland) Revocation Regulations 2010 (S.S.I. 2010 No. 248)
- The Bankruptcy and Diligence etc. (Scotland) Act 2007 (Commencement No. 6 and Savings) Order 2010 (S.S.I. 2010 No. 249 (C. 13))
- The A76 Trunk Road (Hillhead Road, Mauchline to Glendale Cottage, Mauchline) (Temporary Prohibition of Traffic) Order 2010 (S.S.I. 2010 No. 250)
- The Notice to Local Authorities (Scotland) Amendment Regulations 2010 (S.S.I. 2010 No. 251)
- The Grampian Joint Fire and Rescue Board (Specified Equipment) (Scotland) Order 2010 (S.S.I. 2010 No. 252)
- The M77/A77 Trunk Road (Symington and Bogend Toll Improvements) (Prohibition of Specified Turns) Order 2010 (S.S.I. 2010 No. 253)
- The M77/A77 Trunk Road (Symington and Bogend Toll Improvements) (Redetermination of Means of Exercise of Public Right of Passage) Order 2010 (S.S.I. 2010 No. 254)
- The M77/A77 Trunk Road (Symington and Bogend Toll Improvements) (Side Roads) Order 2010 (S.S.I. 2010 No. 255)
- The M876/A876/A977 Trunk Road (Fere Gait and Toll Road) (Temporary Prohibition of Waiting) Order 2010 (S.S.I. 2010 No. 256)
- The South West Unit Trunk Roads Area (Temporary Prohibitions of Traffic, Temporary Prohibitions of Overtaking and Temporary Speed Restrictions) (No.6) Order 2010 (S.S.I. 2010 No. 257)
- The South East Unit Trunk Roads Area (Temporary Prohibitions of Traffic, Temporary Prohibitions of Overtaking and Temporary Speed Restrictions) (No.6) Order 2010 (S.S.I. 2010 No. 258)
- The North West Unit Trunk Roads Area (Temporary Prohibitions of Traffic, Temporary Prohibitions of Overtaking and Temporary Speed Restrictions) (No.6) Order 2010 (S.S.I. 2010 No. 259)
- The North East Unit Trunk Roads Area (Temporary Prohibitions of Traffic, Temporary Prohibitions of Overtaking and Temporary Speed Restrictions) (No.6) Order 2010 (S.S.I. 2010 No. 260)
- The M77/A77 Trunk Road (Symington And Bogend Toll Improvements) (Side Roads) (No. 2) Order 2010 (S.S.I. 2010 No. 261)
- The A83 Trunk Road (Duncholgan and Dalchenna Point) (Temporary Prohibition of Traffic) Order 2010 (S.S.I. 2010 No. 262)
- The M77/A77 Trunk Road (Symington and Bogend Toll Improvements) (Redetermination of Means of Exercise of Public Right of Passage) (No. 2) Order 2010 (S.S.I. 2010 No. 263)
- The Lay Representation in Proceedings relating to Residential Property (Scotland) Order 2010 (S.S.I. 2010 No. 264)
- The A82 Trunk Road (Scottish Open Golf Tournament, Loch Lomond) (Temporary Restriction of Speed) Order 2010 (S.S.I. 2010 No. 265)
- The National Health Service (Tribunal) (Scotland) Amendment (No. 2) Regulations 2010 (S.S.I. 2010 No. 266)
- The Criminal Legal Aid (Fixed Payments) (Scotland) Amendment (No. 2) Regulations 2010 (S.S.I. 2010 No. 267)
- The M90/A90 Trunk Road (Gairneybridge to Milnathort)(Temporary 50 mph Speed Limit) Order 2010 (S.S.I. 2010 No. 268)
- The M9/A9 Trunk Road (Bardrill Junction) (Prohibition of Specified Turns) Order 2010 (S.S.I. 2010 No. 269)
- The Criminal Legal Assistance (Fees) (Scotland) Regulations 2010 (S.S.I. 2010 No. 270)
- The Smoke Control Areas (Authorised Fuels) (Scotland) Regulations 2010 (S.S.I. 2010 No. 271)
- The Smoke Control Areas (Exempt Fireplaces) (Scotland) Order 2010 (S.S.I. 2010 No. 272)
- The Less Favoured Area Support Scheme (Scotland) Regulations 2010 (S.S.I. 2010 No. 273)
- The Additional Support Needs Tribunals for Scotland (Practice and Procedure) Amendment (No. 2) Rules 2010 (S.S.I. 2010 No. 274)
- The Additional Support for Learning (Co-ordinated Support Plan and Dispute Resolution) (Scotland) Amendment Regulations 2010 (S.S.I. 2010 No. 275)
- The Additional Support for Learning (Appropriate Agencies and Sources of Information) (Scotland) Amendment of Commencement Dates Order 2010 (S.S.I. 2010 No. 276)
- The Education (Additional Support for Learning) (Scotland) Act 2009 (Commencement No. 2) Order 2010 (S.S.I. 2010 No. 277 (C. 14))
- The Dormant Bank and Building Society Accounts (Scotland) Order 2010 (S.S.I. 2010 No. 278)
- Act of Sederunt (Sheriff Court Rules) (Miscellaneous Amendments) 2010 (S.S.I. 2010 No. 279)
- The Town and Country Planning (Fees for Applications and Deemed Applications) (Scotland) Amendment (No. 2) Regulations 2010 (S.S.I. 2010 No. 280)
- The A82/A85 Trunk Road Crianlarich (30 mph Speed Limit) and Crianlarich Primary School (Part-time 20 mph Speed Limit) Order 2010 (S.S.I. 2010 No. 281)
- The Budget (Scotland) Act 2010 Amendment Order 2010 (S.S.I. 2010 No. 282)
- The National Health Service (Reimbursement of the Cost of EEA Treatment) (Scotland) Regulations 2010 (S.S.I. 2010 No. 283)
- The A7 Trunk Road (High Street and Townhead, Langholm) (Special Event)(Temporary Prohibition of Traffic) Order 2010 (S.S.I. 2010 No. 284)
- The M8/A8 Trunk Road (Secondary Carriageway, Junction 21, Paisley Road) (Temporary Prohibition of Traffic) Order 2010 (S.S.I. 2010 No. 285)
- The A96 Trunk Road (Allanfearn to Smithton) (Temporary Prohibition of Specified Turns) Order 2010 (S.S.I. 2010 No. 286)
- The Charities Accounts (Scotland) Amendment Regulations 2010 (S.S.I. 2010 No. 287)
- The South West Unit Trunk Roads Area (Temporary Prohibitions of Traffic, Temporary Prohibitions of Overtaking and Temporary Speed Restrictions) (No.7) Order 2010 (S.S.I. 2010 No. 288)
- The South East Unit Trunk Roads Area (Temporary Prohibitions of Traffic, Temporary Prohibitions of Overtaking and Temporary Speed Restrictions) (No.7) Order 2010 (S.S.I. 2010 No. 289)
- The North West Unit Trunk Roads Area (Temporary Prohibitions of Traffic, Temporary Prohibitions of Overtaking and Temporary Speed Restrictions) (No.7) Order 2010 (S.S.I. 2010 No. 290)
- The North East Unit Trunk Roads Area (Temporary Prohibitions of Traffic, Temporary Prohibitions of Overtaking and Temporary Speed Restrictions) (No. 7) Order 2010 (S.S.I. 2010 No. 291)
- The M8/A8 and A737/A738 Trunk Roads (White Cart Viaduct)(Temporary Prohibition of Traffic, Temporary Prohibition of Overtaking and Temporary Speed Restriction) Order 2010 (S.S.I. 2010 No. 292)
- The A77 Trunk Road (Vicarton Street, Girvan) (Prohibition of Waiting, Loading and Unloading) Order 2010 (S.S.I. 2010 No. 293)
- The A725/A726 Trunk Road (Strathclyde Business Park) (Prohibition of Specified Turns) Order 2010 (S.S.I. 2010 No. 294)
- The M876 (Glenbervie Connecting Roads) Side Roads Order 2010 (S.S.I. 2010 No. 295)
- The M876 (Glenbervie Connecting Roads) Special Road Scheme 2010 (S.S.I. 2010 No. 296)
- The Criminal Justice and Licensing (Scotland) Act 2010 (Commencement No. 1) Order 2010 (S.S.I. 2010 No. 297 (C. 15))
- The A96 Trunk Road (Cawdor Castl) Concert) (Temporary Restriction of Speed ) Order 2010 (S.S.I. 2010 No. 298)
- The A76 Trunk Road (Sanquhar) (Restricted Road) Order 2010 (S.S.I. 2010 No. 299)
- The Education (Treatment of Student Loans on Sequestration) (Scotland) Regulations 2010 (S.S.I. 2010 No. 300)

== 301-400 ==
- The A82 Trunk Road (Aonachan West, Spean Bridge) (Stopping Up) Order 2010 (S.S.I. 2010 No. 301)
- The South West Unit Trunk Roads Area (Temporary Prohibitions of Traffic, Temporary Prohibitions of Overtaking and Temporary Speed Restrictions) (No.8) Order 2010 (S.S.I. 2010 No. 302)
- The South East Unit Trunk Roads Area (Temporary Prohibitions of Traffic, Temporary Prohibitions of Overtaking and Temporary Speed Restrictions) (No.8) Order 2010 (S.S.I. 2010 No. 303)
- The North West Unit Trunk Roads Area (Temporary Prohibitions of Traffic, Temporary Prohibitions of Overtaking and Temporary Speed Restrictions) (No.8) Order 2010 (S.S.I. 2010 No. 304)
- The North East Unit Trunk Roads Area (Temporary Prohibitions of Traffic, Temporary Prohibitions of Overtaking and Temporary Speed Restrictions) (No. 8) Order 2010 (S.S.I. 2010 No. 305)
- The A83 Trunk Road (Rest and Be Thankful) (Temporary Prohibition of Traffic) Order 2010 (S.S.I. 2010 No. 306)
- The Nutrition and Health Claims (Scotland) Amendment Regulations 2010 (S.S.I. 2010 No. 307)
- The Addition of Vitamins, Minerals and Other Substances (Scotland) Amendment Regulations 2010 (S.S.I. 2010 No. 308)
- Act of Adjournal (Criminal Procedure Rules Amendment No. 2) (Presentation of Conviction Appeals in Writing) 2010 (S.S.I. 2010 No. 309)
- Act of Sederunt (Lands Valuation Appeal Court) 2010 (S.S.I. 2010 No. 310)
- The Knife Dealer's Licence (Miscellaneous) (Scotland) Order 2010 (S.S.I. 2010 No. 311)
- The Criminal Legal Assistance (Fees) (No. 2) (Scotland) Regulations 2010 (S.S.I. 2010 No. 312)
- The M77/A77 Trunk Road (Junction 2 (Barrhead Road) to Plantation) (Temporary Prohibition of Traffic) Order 2010 (S.S.I. 2010 No. 313)
- The Home Owner and Debtor Protection (Scotland) Act 2010 (Commencement) Order 2010 (S.S.I. 2010 No. 314 (C. 16))
- The Equality Act 2010 (Qualifications Body Regulator and Relevant Qualifications) (Scotland) Regulations 2010 (S.S.I. 2010 No. 315)
- The Home Owner and Debtor Protection (Scotland) Act 2010 (Transitional and Saving Provisions) Order 2010 (S.S.I. 2010 No. 316)
- The Applications by Creditors (Pre-Action Requirements) (Scotland) Order 2010 (S.S.I. 2010 No. 317)
- The Home Owner and Debtor Protection (Scotland) Act 2010 (Consequential Provisions) Order 2010 (S.S.I. 2010 No. 318)
- The National Health Service (Travelling Expenses and Remission of Charges) (Scotland) Amendment (No. 2) Regulations 2010 (S.S.I. 2010 No. 319)
- The Police Pensions (Additional Voluntary Contributions) Amendment (Scotland) Regulations 2010 (S.S.I. 2010 No. 320)
- The Public Services Reform (Scotland) Act 2010 (Commencement No. 2) Order 2010 (S.S.I. 2010 No. 321 (C. 17))
- The Public Services Reform (Scotland) Act 2010 (Ancillary Provisions) Order 2010 (S.S.I. 2010 No. 322)
- The European Fisheries Fund (Grants) (Scotland) Amendment Regulations 2010 (S.S.I. 2010 No. 323)
- Act of Sederunt (Sheriff Court Rules) (Enforcement of Securities over Heritable Property) 2010 (S.S.I. 2010 No. 324)
- The Education (Fees and Awards) (Scotland) Amendment Regulations 2010 (S.S.I. 2010 No. 325)
- The Education (Lower Primary Class Sizes) (Scotland) Amendment Regulations 2010 (S.S.I. 2010 No. 326)
- The Materials and Articles in Contact with Food (Scotland) Regulations 2010 (S.S.I. 2010 No. 327)
- The Food Irradiation (Scotland) Amendment Regulations 2010 (S.S.I. 2010 No. 328)
- The Contaminants in Food (Scotland) Regulations 2010 (S.S.I. 2010 No. 329)
- The Beef and Pig Carcase Classification (Scotland) Regulations 2010 (S.S.I. 2010 No. 330)
- The M8/A8 Trunk Road (Westbound Secondary Carriageway Junction 21, Carnoustie Street to Junction 21 Seaward Street) (Temporary Prohibition of Traffic) Order 2010 (S.S.I. 2010 No. 331)
- The Firefighters’ Pension Scheme Amendment (Scotland) (No. 2) Order 2010 (S.S.I. 2010 No. 332)
- The Firefighters’ Pension Scheme (Scotland) Order 2007 Amendment (No. 2) Order 2010 (S.S.I. 2010 No. 333)
- The Sea Fishing (EU Recording and Reporting Requirements) (Scotland) Order 2010 (S.S.I. 2010 No. 334)
- The South West Unit Trunk Roads Area (Temporary Prohibitions of Traffic, Temporary Prohibitions of Overtaking and Temporary Speed Restrictions) (No. 9) Order 2010 (S.S.I. 2010 No. 335)
- The South East Unit Trunk Roads Area (Temporary Prohibitions of Traffic, Temporary Prohibitions of Overtaking and Temporary Speed Restrictions) (No. 9) Order 2010 (S.S.I. 2010 No. 336)
- The North West Unit Trunk Roads Area (Temporary Prohibitions of Traffic, Temporary Prohibitions of Overtaking and Temporary Speed Restrictions) (No. 9) Order 2010 (S.S.I. 2010 No. 337)
- The North East Unit Trunk Roads Area (Temporary Prohibitions of Traffic, Temporary Prohibitions of Overtaking and Temporary Speed Restrictions) (No. 9) Order 2010 (S.S.I. 2010 No. 338)
- The Criminal Justice and Licensing (Scotland) Act 2010 (Commencement No. 2) Order 2010 (S.S.I. 2010 No. 339 (C. 18))
- Act of Sederunt (Sheriff Court Rules) (Equality Act 2010) 2010 (S.S.I. 2010 No. 340)
- The Special Restrictions on Adoptions from Haiti (Scotland) Order 2010 (S.S.I. 2010 No. 341)
- The Plant Health (Scotland) Amendment (No. 2) Order 2010 (S.S.I. 2010 No. 342)
- The Animals and Animal Products (Import and Export) (Scotland) Amendment Regulations 2010 (S.S.I. 2010 No. 343)
- The Protection of Vulnerable Groups (Scotland) Act 2007 (Commencement No. 4) and the Criminal Justice and Licensing (Scotland) Act 2010 (Commencement No. 3) Order 2010 (S.S.I. 2010 No. 344 (C. 19))
- The Tobacco and Primary Medical Services (Scotland) Act 2010 (Commencement No. 1, Consequential and Saving Provisions) Order 2010 (S.S.I. 2010 No. 345 (C. 20))
- The Protection of Vulnerable Groups (Scotland) Act 2007 (Corresponding Disqualifications) Order 2010 (S.S.I. 2010 No. 346)
- The Loch Lomond and The Trossachs National Park Designation, Transitional and Consequential Provisions (Scotland) Order 2002 Modification Order 2010 (S.S.I. 2010 No. 347)
- The Cairngorms National Park Designation, Transitional and Consequential Provisions (Scotland) Order 2003 Modification Order 2010 (S.S.I. 2010 No. 348)
- The Cairngorms National Park Elections (Scotland) Amendment Order 2010 (S.S.I. 2010 No. 349)
- The Regulation of Investigatory Powers (Prescription of Offices, etc. and Specification of Public Authorities) (Scotland) Order 2010 (S.S.I. 2010 No. 350)
- The Public Appointments and Public Bodies etc. (Scotland) Act 2003 (Treatment of Office or Body as Specified Authority) (No. 2) Order 2010 (S.S.I. 2010 No. 351)
- The M8 Motorway (Junction 20, West Street, to Junction 24, Helen Street) (Temporary 50 mph Speed Limit) Order 2010 (S.S.I. 2010 No. 352)
- The East Dunbartonshire Council Area and Glasgow City Council Area (Princes Gate and Greenacres by Robroyston) Boundaries Alteration Order 2010 (S.S.I. 2010 No. 353)
- The Feed (Sampling and Analysis and Specified Undesirable Substances) (Scotland) Regulations 2010 (S.S.I. 2010 No. 354)
- The Foodstuffs Suitable for People Intolerant to Gluten (Scotland) Regulations 2010 (S.S.I. 2010 No. 355)
- The Mental Welfare Commission for Scotland (Qualifications, Training and Experience of Medical Visitors) Regulations 2010 (S.S.I. 2010 No. 356)
- The Sexual Offences (Scotland) Act 2009 (Commencement No. 1) and the Criminal Justice and Licensing (Scotland) Act 2010 (Commencement No. 4) Order 2010 (S.S.I. 2010 No. 357 (C. 21))
- The M80/A80 Trunk Road (Lowwoods Southbound On Slip) (Temporary 30 mph Speed Restriction) Order 2010 (S.S.I. 2010 No. 358)
- Climate Change (Annual Targets) (Scotland) Order 2010 (SSI 2010/359)
- The A90 Trunk Road (A932 Lochlands Junction, Forfar) (Prohibition of Specified Turns) Order 2010 (S.S.I. 2010 No. 360)
- The A1 Trunk Road (Spott Roundabout to Skateraw Railway Overbridge)(Temporary Prohibition of Specified Turns) Order 2010 (S.S.I. 2010 No. 361)
- The South East Unit Trunk Roads Area (Temporary Prohibitions of Traffic, Temporary Prohibitions of Overtaking and Temporary Speed Restrictions) (No.10) Order 2010 (S.S.I. 2010 No. 362)
- The South West Unit Trunk Roads Area (Temporary Prohibitions of Traffic, Temporary Prohibitions of Overtaking and Temporary Speed Restrictions) (No.10) Order 2010 (S.S.I. 2010 No. 363)
- The North West Unit Trunk Roads Area (Temporary Prohibitions of Traffic, Temporary Prohibitions of Overtaking and Temporary Speed Restrictions) (No.10) Order 2010 (S.S.I. 2010 No. 364)
- The North East Unit Trunk Roads Area (Temporary Prohibitions of Traffic, Temporary Prohibitions of Overtaking and Temporary Speed Restrictions) (No. 10) Order 2010 (S.S.I. 2010 No. 365)
- The National Health Service (Charges for Drugs and Appliances) (Scotland) Amendment (No. 2) Regulations 2010 (S.S.I. 2010 No. 366)
- The Bankruptcy (Scotland) Amendment Regulations 2010 (S.S.I. 2010 No. 367)
- The Education (Additional Support for Learning) (Scotland) Act 2009 (Commencement No. 3) Order 2010 (S.S.I. 2010 No. 368 (C. 22))
- The National Health Service (Superannuation Scheme, Pension Scheme, Injury Benefits and Additional Voluntary Contributions) (Scotland) Amendment (No. 2) Regulations 2010 (S.S.I. 2010 No. 369)
- The Sexual Offences Act 2003 (Remedial) (Scotland) Order 2010 (S.S.I. 2010 No. 370)
- The A92/A972 Trunk Road (Private Access-Markinch Roundabout) (Prohibition of Specified Turns) Order 2010 (S.S.I. 2010 No. 371)
- The Tobacco and Primary Medical Services (Scotland) Act 2010 (Commencement No. 2) Order 2010 (S.S.I. 2010 No. 372 (C. 23))
- The Animal Feed (Scotland) Regulations 2010 (S.S.I. 2010 No. 373)
- The Fishing Boats (EU Electronic Reporting) (Scotland) Scheme 2010 (S.S.I. 2010 No. 374)
- The Scallops (Luce Bay) (Prohibition of Fishing) Order 2010 (S.S.I. 2010 No. 375)
- The Legal Profession and Legal Aid (Scotland) Act 2007 (Commencement No. 6) Order 2010 (S.S.I. 2010 No. 376 (C. 24))
- The Criminal Legal Aid (Scotland) Amendment Regulations 2010 (S.S.I. 2010 No. 377)
- The National Health Service (General Ophthalmic Services and General Dental Services) (Scotland) Amendment Regulations 2010 (S.S.I. 2010 No. 378)
- The Scottish Social Services Council (Appointments, Procedure and Access to the Register) Amendment (No. 2) Regulations 2010 (S.S.I. 2010 No. 379)
- The Protection of Vulnerable Groups (Scotland) Act 2007 (Power to Refer) (Information Held by Public Bodies etc.) Order 2010 (S.S.I. 2010 No. 380)
- The Protection of Vulnerable Groups (Scotland) Act 2007 (Prescribed Purposes for Consideration of Suitability) Regulations 2010 (S.S.I. 2010 No. 381)
- The Police Act 1997 (Alteration of the Meaning of Suitability Information relating to Children and Protected Adults) (Scotland) (No. 2) Order 2010 (S.S.I. 2010 No. 382)
- The Police Act 1997 (Criminal Records) (Registration) (Scotland) Regulations 2010 (S.S.I. 2010 No. 383)
- The A96 Trunk Road (Church Road, Keith) (Special Event) (Temporary Prohibition of Traffic) Order 2010 (S.S.I. 2010 No. 384)
- The Criminal Justice and Licensing (Scotland) Act 2010 (Commencement No. 5) Order 2010 (S.S.I. 2010 No. 385 (C. 25))
- Act of Adjournal (Criminal Procedure Rules Amendment No. 3) (Scottish Criminal Cases Review Commission) 2010 (S.S.I. 2010 No. 386)
- The Prohibited Procedures on Protected Animals (Exemptions) (Scotland) Regulations 2010 (S.S.I. 2010 No. 387)
- The Welfare of Farmed Animals (Scotland) Regulations 2010 (S.S.I. 2010 No. 388)
- The Public Finance and Accountability (Scotland) Act 2000 (Economy, efficiency and effectiveness examinations) (Specified bodies etc.) Order 2010 (S.S.I. 2010 No. 389)
- The Cleaner Road Transport Vehicles (Scotland) Regulations 2010 (S.S.I. 2010 No. 390)
- The Non-Domestic Rating Contributions (Scotland) Amendment Regulations 2010 (S.S.I. 2010 No. 391)
- The Ethical Standards in Public Life etc. (Scotland) Act 2000 (Register of Interests) Amendment Regulations 2010 (S.S.I. 2010 No. 392)
- The Fire Safety (Scotland) Amendment Regulations 2010 (S.S.I. 2010 No. 393)
- The National Health Service (General Medical Services Contracts) (Scotland) Amendment Regulations 2010 (S.S.I. 2010 No. 394)
- The National Health Service (Primary Medical Services Section 17C Agreements) (Scotland) Amendment Regulations 2010 (S.S.I. 2010 No. 395)
- The A9 Trunk Road (Bankfoot) (Temporary Prohibition of Specified Turns) Order 2010 (S.S.I. 2010 No. 396)
- The Bankruptcy (Certificate for Sequestration) (Scotland) Regulations 2010 (S.S.I. 2010 No. 397)
- The Protected Trust Deeds (Scotland) Amendment Regulations 2010 (S.S.I. 2010 No. 398)
- The A90 Trunk Road (A932 Lochlands Junction, Forfar) (Prohibition of Specified Turns) (No.2) Order 2010 (S.S.I. 2010 No. 399)
- The Planning etc. (Scotland) Act 2006 (Commencement No. 10) Order 2010 (S.S.I. 2010 No. 400 (C. 26))

== 401-471 ==
- The Flood Risk Management (Scotland) Act 2009 (Commencement No. 2 and Savings Provisions) Order 2010 (S.S.I. 2010 No. 401 (C. 27))
- The Beef and Veal Labelling (Scotland) Regulations 2010 (S.S.I. 2010 No. 402)
- The St. Andrews Harbour Revision (Constitution) Order 2010 (S.S.I. 2010 No. 403)
- The Fees in the Registers of Scotland Amendment Order 2010 (S.S.I. 2010 No. 404)
- The Plant Health (Import Inspection Fees) (Scotland) Amendment Regulations 2010 (S.S.I. 2010 No. 405)
- The Sale of Tobacco (Prescribed Document) Regulations 2010 (S.S.I. 2010 No. 406)
- The Sale of Tobacco (Register of Tobacco Retailers) Regulations 2010 (S.S.I. 2010 No. 407)
- The South West Unit Trunk Roads Area (Temporary Prohibitions of Traffic, Temporary Prohibitions of Overtaking and Temporary Speed Restrictions) (No.11) Order 2010 (S.S.I. 2010 No. 408)
- The South East Unit Trunk Roads Area (Temporary Prohibitions of Traffic, Temporary Prohibitions of Overtaking and Temporary Speed Restrictions) (No.11) Order 2010 (S.S.I. 2010 No. 409)
- The North West Unit Trunk Roads Area (Temporary Prohibitions of Traffic, Temporary Prohibitions of Overtaking and Temporary Speed Restrictions) (No.11) Order 2010 (S.S.I. 2010 No. 410)
- The North East Unit Trunk Roads Area (Temporary Prohibitions of Traffic, Temporary Prohibitions of Overtaking and Temporary Speed Restrictions) (No. 11) Order 2010 (S.S.I. 2010 No. 411)
- The A77 Trunk Road (Dalrymple Street, Girvan) (Special Event) (Temporary Prohibition of Traffic) Order 2010 (S.S.I. 2010 No. 412)
- The Criminal Justice and Licensing (Scotland) Act 2010 (Commencement No. 6, Transitional and Savings Provisions) Order 2010 (S.S.I. 2010 No. 413 (C. 28))
- The M77/A77 Trunk Road (Holmston Roundabout to B7035 St Quivox Junction) (Redetermination of Means of Exercise of Public Right of Passage) Order 2010 (S.S.I. 2010 No. 414)
- The Legal Profession and Legal Aid (Scotland) Act 2007 (Membership of the Scottish Legal Complaints Commission) Amendment Order 2010 (S.S.I. 2010 No. 415)
- Act of Sederunt (Sheriff Court Rules) (Miscellaneous Amendments) (No. 2) 2010 (S.S.I. 2010 No. 416)
- Act of Sederunt (Rules of the Court of Session Amendment No. 5) (Miscellaneous) 2010 (S.S.I. 2010 No. 417)
- Act of Adjournal (Criminal Procedure Rules Amendment No. 4) (Miscellaneous) 2010 (S.S.I. 2010 No. 418)
- The Sheep Scab (Scotland) Order 2010 (S.S.I. 2010 No. 419)
- The Regulation of Investigatory Powers (Scotland) Amendment Order 2010 (S.S.I. 2010 No. 420)
- The Sexual Offences (Scotland) Act 2009 (Supplemental and Consequential Provisions) Order 2010 (S.S.I. 2010 No. 421)
- The Community Health Partnerships (Scotland) Amendment Regulations 2010 (S.S.I. 2010 No. 422)
- The A86 Trunk Road (Manse Road Junction, Kingussie) (Prohibition of Waiting) Order 2010 (S.S.I. 2010 No. 423)
- The Jurors’ Allowances (Scotland) Regulations 2010 (S.S.I. 2010 No. 424)
- The Vegetable Seeds Amendment (Scotland) Regulations 2010 (S.S.I. 2010 No. 425)
- The Flood Risk Management (Flood Protection Schemes, Potentially Vulnerable Areas and Local Plan Districts) (Scotland) Regulations 2010 (S.S.I. 2010 No. 426)
- The Registration Services (Fees) Amendment (Scotland) Regulations 2010 (S.S.I. 2010 No. 427)
- The Registration of Births, Deaths and Marriages (Fees) (Scotland) Order 2010 (S.S.I. 2010 No. 428)
- The Scallops (Luce Bay) (Prohibition of Fishing) Variation Order 2010 (S.S.I. 2010 No. 429)
- The Planning etc. (Scotland) Act 2006 (Commencement No. 11) Order 2010 (S.S.I. 2010 No. 430 (C. 29))
- The Planning etc. (Scotland) Act 2006 (Saving and Transitional Provisions) Order 2010 (S.S.I. 2010 No. 431)
- The Town and Country Planning (Modification and Discharge of Planning Obligations) (Scotland) Regulations 2010 (S.S.I. 2010 No. 432)
- The Town and Country Planning (Modification and Discharge of Good Neighbour Agreement) (Scotland) Regulations 2010 (S.S.I. 2010 No. 433)
- The Town and Country Planning (Tree Preservation Order and Trees in Conservation Areas) (Scotland) Regulations 2010 (S.S.I. 2010 No. 434)
- Waste Information (Scotland) Regulations 2010 (SSI 2010/435)
- The Housing (Scotland) Act 2006 (Commencement No. 9) Order 2010 (S.S.I. 2010 No. 436 (C. 30))
- The Crofting Reform (Scotland) Act 2010 (Commencement, Saving and Transitory Provisions) Order 2010 (S.S.I. 2010 No. 437 (C. 31))
- The Wild Birds (Special Protection in Severe Weather) (Scotland) (No. 2) Order 2010 (S.S.I. 2010 No. 438)
- The Flavourings in Food (Scotland) Regulations 2010 (S.S.I. 2010 No. 439)
- The Non-Domestic Rates (Levying) (Scotland) (No. 2) Regulations 2010 (S.S.I. 2010 No. 440)
- The Non-Domestic Rates (Levying) (Scotland) (No. 3) Regulations 2010 (S.S.I. 2010 No. 441)
- The Regulation of Care (Social Service Workers) (Scotland) Amendment Order 2010 (S.S.I. 2010 No. 442)
- The Regulation of Care (Fitness of Employees in Relation to Care Services) (Scotland) (No. 2) Amendment Regulations 2010 (S.S.I. 2010 No. 443)
- The Housing (Scotland) Act 2010 (Commencement No. 1) Order 2010 (S.S.I. 2010 No. 444 (C. 32))
- The Budget (Scotland) Act 2010 Amendment (No. 2) Order 2010 (S.S.I. 2010 No. 445)
- The Protection of Vulnerable Groups (Scotland) Act 2007 (Miscellaneous Provisions) Order 2010 (S.S.I. 2010 No. 446)
- The M8, M73, M74 (Network Improvements) Special Road (Redetermination of Means of Exercise of Public Right of Passage) Order 2010 (S.S.I. 2010 No. 447)
- The Official Statistics (Scotland) Amendment Order 2010 (S.S.I. 2010 No. 448)
- The Number of Inner House Judges (Variation) Order 2010 (S.S.I. 2010 No. 449)
- The Eggs and Chicks (Scotland) Amendment Regulations 2010 (S.S.I. 2010 No. 450)
- The M8, M73, M74 (Network Improvements) Special Road Scheme 2010 (S.S.I. 2010 No. 451)
- The M8, M73, M74 (Network Improvements) Special Road (Side Roads) Order 2010 (S.S.I. 2010 No. 452)
- The M74 Special Road (Junction 5, Raith) Appropriation Order 2010 (S.S.I. 2010 No. 453)
- The M74 Special Road, (Junction 5, Raith) Special Road Scheme 2010 (S.S.I. 2010 No. 454)
- The M74 Special Road (Junction 5, Raith) (Redetermination of Means of Exercise of Public Right of Passage) Order 2010 (S.S.I. 2010 No. 455)
- The M74 Special Road (Junction 5, Raith)(Side Roads) Order 2010 (S.S.I. 2010 No. 456)
- The Non-Domestic Rate (Scotland) (No. 2) Order 2010 (S.S.I. 2010 No. 457)
- The A830 Trunk Road (Banavie Swing Bridge) (Temporary Width Restriction) Order 2010 (S.S.I. 2010 No. 458)
- Act of Sederunt (Rules of the Court of Session Amendment No. 6) (Terrorist Asset-Freezing etc. Act 2010) 2010 (S.S.I. 2010 No. 459)
- The National Scenic Areas (Consequential Modifications) (Scotland) Order 2010 (S.S.I. 2010 No. 460)
- The Civil Legal Aid (Scotland) Amendment Regulations 2010 (S.S.I. 2010 No. 461)
- The Advice and Assistance (Scotland) Amendment Regulations 2010 (S.S.I. 2010 No. 462)
- The South West Unit Trunk Roads Area (Temporary Prohibitions of Traffic, Temporary Prohibitions of Overtaking and Temporary Speed Restrictions) (No. 12) Order 2010 (S.S.I. 2010 No. 463)
- The South East Unit Trunk Roads Area (Temporary Prohibitions of Traffic, Temporary Prohibitions of Overtaking and Temporary Speed Restrictions) (No. 12) Order 2010 (S.S.I. 2010 No. 464)
- The North West Unit Trunk Roads Area (Temporary Prohibitions of Traffic, Temporary Prohibitions of Overtaking and Temporary Speed Restrictions) (No. 12) Order 2010 (S.S.I. 2010 No. 465)
- The North East Unit Trunk Roads Area (Temporary Prohibitions of Traffic, Temporary Prohibitions of Overtaking and Temporary Speed Restrictions) (No. 12) Order 2010 (S.S.I. 2010 No. 466)
- The Town and Country Planning (Determination of Appeals by Appointed Persons) (Prescribed Classes) (Scotland) Regulations 2010 (S.S.I. 2010 No. 467)
- The Limitation on Right to Purchase (Form of Notice) (Scotland) Regulations 2010 (S.S.I. 2010 No. 468)
- The Housing (Scotland) Act 2010 (Consequential Amendment) Order 2010 (S.S.I. 2010 No. 469)
- The Wild Birds (Special Protection in Severe Weather) (Scotland) (No. 3) Order 2010 (S.S.I. 2010 No. 470)
- The Lerwick Harbour Revision Order 2010 (S.S.I. 2010 No. 471)
