= HMS Zephyr (1895) =

Fervent-class destroyer

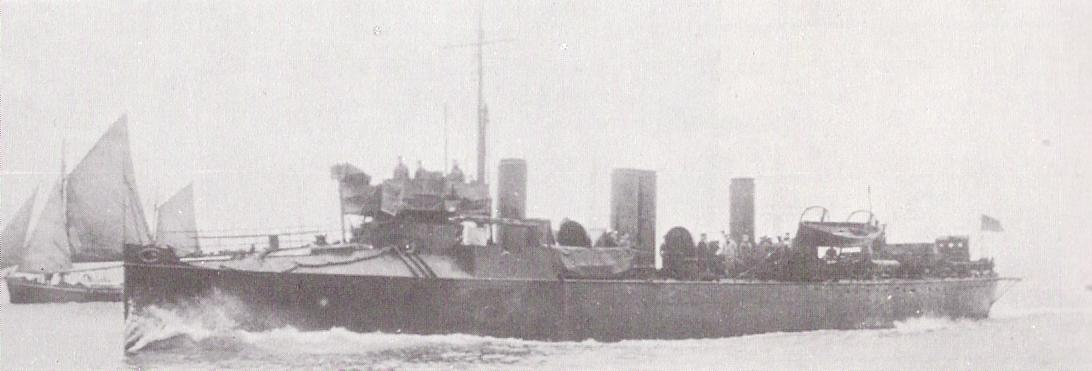
- HMS Zephyr with four funnels, after reboilering and the addition of three funnels.

History

United Kingdom
- Name: HMS Zephyr
- Builder: Hanna, Donald & Wilson, Paisley
- Laid down: 23 April 1894
- Launched: 10 May 1895
- Completed: July 1901
- Fate: Scrapped 1920

General characteristics
- Class & type: Fervent-class destroyer
- Displacement: 275 tons light; 320 tons full load
- Length: 200 ft (61 m) pp; 204 ft 6 in (62.33 m) oa
- Beam: 19 ft (5.8 m)
- Draught: 7 ft 3 in (2.21 m)
- Installed power: 4,000 ihp (3.0 MW)
- Propulsion: Triple expansion steam engine; two shafts
- Speed: 26 knots (48 km/h)
- Armament: 1 × 12-pounder gun; 5 × 6-pounder guns; 2 × 18 in (450 mm) torpedo tubes

HMS Zephyr was one of two Fervent-class destroyers which served with the Royal Navy. She was launched on 10 May 1895 from Hanna, Donald & Wilson at Paisley, Scotland. She served in home waters, and was sold in 1920.

== Construction and design ==
HMS Zephyr was one of two "twenty-seven knotter" torpedo boat destroyers ordered from the Scottish shipyard Hanna, Donald & Wilson on 7 November 1893 as part of the Royal Navy's 1893–1894 construction programme. (Note: In total, 36 destroyers were ordered as part of this programme.) The Admiralty laid down broad requirements for the destroyers, including a speed of 27 knots (50 km/h; 31 mph) on sea trials, a "turtleback" forecastle and armament, which was to vary depending on whether the ship was to be used in the torpedo boat or gunboat role. As a torpedo boat, the planned armament was a single QF 12 pounder 12 cwt (3 in (76 mm) calibre) (Note: "Cwt" is the abbreviation for hundredweight, 12cwt referring to the weight of the gun.) gun on a platform on the ship's conning tower (in practice the platform was also used as the ship's bridge), together with a secondary gun armament of three 6-pounder guns, and two 18 inch (450 mm) torpedo tubes. As a gunboat, one of the torpedo tubes could be removed to accommodate a further two six-pounders. (Note: In practice, by 1908, most twenty-seven knotters, including Zephyr, carried both the full torpedo and gun armaments at the same time.) Detailed design was left to the builders (although all designs were approved by the Admiralty), resulting in each of the builders producing different designs rather the ships being built to a standard design.

Zephyr was 204 feet 6 inches (62.33 m) long overall and 200 feet 0 inches (60.96 m) between perpendiculars, with a beam of 19 feet 0 inches (5.79 m) and a draught of 7 feet 3 inches (2.21 m). Displacement was 275 long tons (279 t) normal and 320 long tons (330 t) full load. As originally built, the ship was powered by two triple expansion steam engines rated at 4,000 indicated horsepower (3,000 kW), fed from two locomotive boilers, with the boilers' outtakes ducted together into a single funnel. (Note: The Fervent class were the only contemporary destroyers to be built with a single funnel.)

Zephyr was laid down at Hanna, Donald & Wilson's Paisley yard on 23 May 1894 and launched on 10 May 1895. The fire-tube locomotive boilers chosen by Hanna, Donald & Wilson, and the two ships were unable to reach the required speed. In August 1897, it was agreed to replace the locomotive boilers with four Reed water tube boilers, which resulted in the ships' single funnels being removed and replaced by four funnels. Despite the revised machinery, Zephyr and sister ship Fervent were still unable to reach the contract speed of 27 knots, but were eventually accepted into service, with Zephyr completing in July 1901, the last of the "twenty-seven knotters" to enter service with the Royal Navy.

== Service history ==
Zephyr took part in the Naval Manoeuvres in July 1901. In August 1901, Zephyr was commissioned at Devonport by the officers and crew of the destroyer Decoy, whose place she took as instructional tender to Cambridge, gunnery school ship, and took part in the 1901 Naval Manoeuvres. Although contemporary reports suggested that Zephyr and her sister would be allocated to the Australian station, the two ships served their whole career in British waters. Zephyr served in the Portsmouth instructional flotilla until she was paid off at Portsmouth in April 1902, and docked to be strengthened, after she and her sister suffered hull damage below the waterline while being driven into a head sea in heavy weather in the English Channel. She took part in the fleet review held at Spithead on 16 August 1902 for the coronation of King Edward VII. Two years later, on 18 August 1904 Zephyr was rammed by Torpedo Boat No. 68 in Portsmouth Harbour and holed below the waterline by the torpedo boat's ram, flooding Zephyr's engine room. The torpedo boat was undamaged. Zephyr was involved in another collision on 4 February 1908 when she struck the Cricket-class coastal destroyer TB 2 in Portsmouth harbour, holing TB 2' s hull and forcing her to be docked for repair.

Between 1910 and 1912, Zephyr served as part of the Sixth Destroyer Flotilla based at The Nore. On 14 June 1911 Zephyr collided with the destroyer Zebra during night exercises off the mouth of the River Thames. One of Zebra's six-pounder guns and two of her boats were knocked into the sea, but no crew were injured. After repair, Zephyr was attached to the Harwich submarine flotilla, relieving the destroyer Porcupine. On 30 August 1912 the Admiralty directed all destroyers were to be grouped into classes designated by letters based on contract speed and appearance. After 30 September 1913, as a 27-knotter, Zephyr was assigned to the A class.

By February 1913, Zephyr was not part of an active flotilla, but was attached as a tender to the torpedo school at Chatham, with a nucleus crew, although she was in full commission by May 1913. She remained part of the torpedo school based at Chatham on the eve of the outbreak of the First World War.

Zephyr joined the Nore Local Defence Flotilla on the outbreak of war, remaining a part of that formation in August 1916, and after a break, from November that year. Zephyr underwent a long refit in the summer of 1917, remaining as part of the Nore Local Defence Flotilla, until February 1918, when she joined the Irish Sea Flotilla. Zephyr continued operations in the Irish Sea, based at Kingstown (now Dún Laoghaire) in the south of Ireland, until the end of the war.

She was sold on 10 February 1920 to the ship breakers Thos. W. Ward at their Rainham yard.
