= HMS Electra (1896) =

Destroyer of the Royal Navy

History

United Kingdom
- Name: Electra
- Ordered: 1895 – 1896 Naval Estimates
- Builder: J & G Thompson, Clydebank
- Laid down: 18 October 1895
- Launched: 14 July 1896
- Commissioned: July 1900
- Out of service: Laid up in reserve 1919
- Fate: 29 April 1920 sold to Barking Ship Breaking Company for breaking

General characteristics
- Class & type: Clydebank three-funnel, 30-knot destroyer
- Displacement: 380 long tons (386 t) standard; 425 long tons (432 t) full load; 214 ft (65 m) o/a; 20 ft (6.1 m) Beam; 8 ft 6 in (2.59 m) Draught
- Propulsion: 4 × Thornycroft water tube boiler; 2 × Vertical Triple Expansion (VTE) steam engines driving 2 shafts producing 5,800 shp (4,300 kW)
- Speed: 30 kn (56 km/h)
- Range: 80 tons coal; 1,465 nmi (2,713 km) at 11 kn (20 km/h; 13 mph)
- Complement: 63 officers and men
- Armament: 1 × QF 12-pounder 12 cwt Mark I L/40 naval gun on a P Mark I Low angle mount; 5 × QF 6-pdr 8 cwt naval gun L/40 Naval gun on a Mark I* low angle mount; 2 × single tubes for 18-inch (450mm) torpedoes

Service record
- Operations: World War I 1914 – 1918

HMS Electra was a Clydebank-built, three-funnelled, 30-knot destroyer ordered by the Royal Navy under the 1895–1896 Naval Estimates. She was the fourth ship to carry this name since it was introduced in 1806 for a 16-gun brig-sloop.

In 1913 she was grouped along with similar vessels as a C-class destroyer.

== Construction ==
She was laid down as yard number 289 on 18 October 1895, at J & G Thompson shipyard in Clydebank, and launched on 14 July 1896. During her builder's trials, she had problems attaining her contract speed. Her hull was lengthened by 4 feet (1 m), then she made her contract speed of 30 knots (56 km/h; 35 mph). She was completed and accepted by the Royal Navy in July 1900.

== Service ==
After commissioning Electra was assigned to the Chatham Division of the Harwich Flotilla. She was deployed in home waters for her entire service life. On 1 January 1901 she was commissioned by Lieutenant Bertram Sutton Evans as part of the Portsmouth instructional flotilla, taking the place and crew from HMS Star, but he was succeeded in command only two weeks later by Lieutenant Cecil Dacre Staveley Raikes. In June 1902 she took the place of HMS Fervent in the Portsmouth instructional flotilla, under the command of Lieutenant Rowland Henry Bather, but he transferred to HMS Lightning after two months. The destroyer took part in the fleet review held at Spithead on 16 August 1902 for the coronation of King Edward VII.

On 30 August 1912 the Admiralty directed all destroyer classes were to be designated by letters. Since her design speed was 30 knots (56 km/h; 35 mph) and she had three funnels, she was assigned with vessels built to the same specification as the C class. After 30 September 1913, she was known as a C-class destroyer and had the letter ‘C’ painted on the hull below the bridge area and on either the fore or aft funnel.

In 1914 she was in active commission at the Nore based at Sheerness tendered to HMS Actaeon, a Royal Navy training establishment. With the outbreak of hostilities in August 1914 she was assigned to the Nore Local Flotilla. Her duties included anti-submarine and counter-mining patrols in the Thames Estuary.

In 1919 she was paid off and laid-up in reserve awaiting disposal. She was sold on 29 April 1920 to Barking Ship Breaking Company for breaking.

== Pennant numbers ==
Pennant Number	From	To
N55	6 Dec 1914	1 Sep 1915
D52	1 Sep 1915	1 Jan 1918
D31	1 Jan 1918	29 Apr 1920

== Bibliography ==
- Chesneau, Roger & Kolesnik, Eugene M., eds. (1979). Conway's All The World's Fighting Ships 1860–1905. London: Conway Maritime Press. ISBN 0-85177-133-5.
- Colledge, J. J.; Warlow, Ben (2006) [1969]. Ships of the Royal Navy: The Complete Record of All Fighting Ships of the Royal Navy from the 15th Century to the Present (3rd Rev ed.). London: Chatham Publishing. ISBN 978-1-86176-281-8. OCLC 67375475.
- Dittmar, F. J. & Colledge, J. J. (1972). British Warships 1914–1919. Shepperton, UK: Ian Allan. ISBN 0-7110-0380-7.
- Friedman, Norman (2009). British Destroyers: From Earliest Days to the Second World War. Barnsley, UK: Seaforth Publishing. ISBN 978-1-84832-049-9.
- Gardiner, Robert & Gray, Randal, eds. (1985). Conway's All The World's Fighting Ships 1906–1921. London: Conway Maritime Press. ISBN 0-85177-245-5.
- Lyon, David (2001) [1996]. The First Destroyers. London: Caxton Editions. ISBN 1-84067-3648.
- Manning, T. D. (1961). The British Destroyer. London: Putnam & Co. OCLC 6470051.
- March, Edgar J. (1966). British Destroyers: A History of Development, 1892–1953; Drawn by Admiralty Permission From Official Records & Returns, Ships' Covers & Building Plans. London: Seeley Service. OCLC 164893555.
