= HMS Fervent (1895) =

Fervent-class destroyer

History

United Kingdom
- Name: HMS Fervent
- Builder: Hanna, Donald & Wilson, Paisley
- Launched: 20 March 1895
- Fate: Sold for scrap, 29 April 1920

General characteristics
- Class & type: Fervent-class destroyer
- Displacement: 275 long tons (279 t)
- Length: 200 ft (61 m)
- Propulsion: 3,850 shp (2,871 kW)
- Speed: 27 knots (50 km/h; 31 mph)
- Complement: 53
- Armament: 1 × 12 pounder gun; 2 × torpedo tubes

HMS Fervent was a Fervent-class destroyer which served with the Royal Navy. Fervent was launched on 28 March 1895 at Paisley.

== Construction and design ==
HMS Fervent was one of two "twenty-seven knotter" torpedo boat destroyers ordered from the Scottish shipyard Hanna, Donald & Wilson on 7 November 1893 as part of the Royal Navy's 1893–1894 construction programme. (Note: In total, 36 destroyers were ordered as part of this programme.) The Admiralty laid down broad requirements for the destroyers, including a speed of 27 knots (50 km/h; 31 mph) on sea trials, a "turtleback" forecastle and armament, which was to vary depending on whether the ship was to be used in the torpedo boat or gunboat role. As a torpedo boat, the planned armament was a single QF 12 pounder 12 cwt (3 in (76 mm) calibre) (Note: "Cwt" is the abbreviation for hundredweight, 12cwt referring to the weight of the gun.) gun on a platform on the ship's conning tower (in practice the platform was also used as the ship's bridge), together with a secondary gun armament of three 6-pounder guns, and two 18 inch (450 mm) torpedo tubes. As a gunboat, one of the torpedo tubes could be removed to accommodate a further two six-pounders. (Note: In practice, by 1908, most twenty-seven knotters, including Fervent, carried both the full torpedo and gun armaments at the same time.) Detailed design was left to the builders (although all designs were approved by the Admiralty), resulting in each of the builders producing different designs rather the ships being built to a standard design.

Fervent was 204 feet 6 inches (62.33 m) long overall and 200 feet 0 inches (60.96 m) between perpendiculars, with a beam of 19 feet 0 inches (5.79 m) and a draught of 7 feet 3 inches (2.21 m). Displacement was 275 long tons (279 t) normal and 320 long tons (330 t) full load. As originally built, the ship was powered by two triple expansion steam engines rated at 4,000 indicated horsepower (3,000 kW), fed from two locomotive boilers, with the boilers' outtakes ducted together into a single funnel. (Note: The Fervent class were the only contemporary destroyers to be built with a single funnel.)

Fervent was laid down at Hanna, Donald & Wilson's Paisley yard on 27 March 1894 and launched on 20 March 1895, with construction being slowed by the unusually cold winter of 1894–1895. The fire-tube locomotive boilers chosen by Hanna, Donald & Wilson were prone to leaks in their copper water-jacketed fireboxes, and the two ships were unable to reach the required speed. In August 1897, it was agreed to replace the locomotive boilers with four Reed water tube boilers, which resulted in the ships' single funnels being removed and replaced by four funnels. Despite the revised machinery, Fervent and sister ship Zephyr were still unable to reach the contract speed of 27 knots, with Fervent only make 26.7 knots (49.4 km/h) at her trials, but were eventually accepted into service, with Fervent completing in June 1901.

== Service ==
Fervent served in home waters after belatedly leaving her builders, Hanna, Donald & Wilson, in 1901, six years after she was launched. The ship took part in the 1901 Naval Manoeuvres. Lieutenant Cecil Halsted France-Hayhurst was appointed in command in March 1902, but the ship was temporarily paid off at Portsmouth the following month to be strengthened, after she and her sister suffered hull damage below the waterline while being driven into a head sea in heavy weather in the English Channel. With France-Hayhurst transferred to attend a signal course, Lieutenant Walter Reginald Glynn Petre was appointed in command of Fervent on 21 June 1902, when she joined the Portsmouth instructional flotilla.

Between 1910 and 1912, Fervent served as part of the Sixth Destroyer Flotilla based at The Nore. Fervent ran aground on the Maplin Sands on 26 November 1910. Her commanding officer was reprimanded in the resulting Court Martial. On the way to the Court Martial, Fervent ran into a mooring buoy in Sheerness harbour, damaging her stem so that she had to go into dry dock for repair. On 9 August 1912 a cutter carrying 23 Boy Scouts capsized off the Isle of Sheppey, with nine boys drowned. Fervent ferried the bodies of eight of the dead back to London. On 30 August 1912 the Admiralty directed all destroyers were to be grouped into classes designated by letters based on contract speed and appearance. After 30 September 1913, as a 27-knotter, Fervent was assigned to the A class.

By February 1913, Fervent was not part of an active flotilla, but was attached as a tender to the torpedo school at Chatham, with a nucleus crew, although she was in full commission by May 1913. She remained part of the torpedo school based at Chatham on the eve of the outbreak of the First World War.

By February 1915, Fervent was listed as part of the Local Defence Flotilla based at The Nore. The destroyer was still a member of the Nore Defence Flotilla at the end of the war in November 1918.

In January 1919, Fervent was listed as being temporarily at the Nore, and not part of any flotilla. Fervent, along with the destroyers Cygnet, Cynthia and Electra, was paid off at Chatham on 26 April 1919. Fervent was offered for sale in April 1920, and sold to Thos. W. Ward for scrapping at their Rainham works on 29 April 1920.

== Pennant numbers ==
Pennant number	From	To
N17	1914	September 1915
D97	September 1915	January 1918
D39	January 1918	-
