= Cecil Dacre Staveley Raikes =

Vice-Admiral Cecil Dacre Staveley Raikes, CBE (29 May 1874 – 15 February 1947) was a Royal Navy officer.

== Biography ==
The son of the Conservative politician Henry Cecil Raikes, he entered the Royal Navy in 1888. He was promoted to lieutenant in 1895. His first command came on 15 January 1901, when he was appointed to the destroyer HMS Electra, serving in the Portsmouth instructional flotilla. On 5 December 1901 he was appointed to command of HMS Thrasher, set to serve as tender to the battleship Formidable on the Mediterranean station, for which she left Devonport in January the following year. While at Malta the Thrasher was in May 1902 involved in a collision with the destroyer Coquette, and had her stern damaged. Raikes was found at fault and warned to be more cautions in the future, but continued in command of the ship.

During the First World War, Raikes saw action in Gallipoli, in the Red Sea, and in East African waters.

Appointed CBE in 1923, he was promoted to rear-admiral and retired in 1924. He was promoted to vice-admiral on the Retired list on 23 May 1929.
