= Bertram Evans =

English cricketer

Captain Bertram Evans MVO
- Born: Bertram Sutton Evans; 17 December 1872; Godalming, Surrey, England
- Died: 2 March 1919 (aged 46); Paris, France
- Burial place: Paris; 48.9044°N 2.4102°E
- Military career
- Allegiance: United Kingdom
- Branch: Royal Navy
- Service years: 1892–1919
- Rank: Captain
- Commands: HMS Star; HMS Pandora; HMS Minerva; HMS Europa; HMS Macedonia; HMS Implacable
- Conflicts: First World War; Battle of the Falkland Islands
- Awards: Royal Victorian Order
- Cricket career

Cricket information
- Batting: Right-handed

Domestic team information
- Years: Team
- 1900–1909: Hampshire

Career statistics
Competition	First-class
Matches	5
Runs scored	67
Batting average	31.40
100s/50s	–/–
Top score	18
Catches/stumpings	2/–
- Source: Bertram Evans at Cricinfo

Bertram Sutton Evans MVO (17 December 1872 — 2 March 1919) was an English first-class cricketer and Royal Navy officer. He was commissioned into the Royal Navy from the Britannia Royal Naval College. Evans would hold a number of commands throughout his career, which was not without controversy, with him being reprimanded by the Admiralty on three occasions. He would see action in the First World War and was present at the Battle of the Falkland Islands commanding the armed merchant cruiser HMS Macedonia. In addition to his naval career, Evans was also a first-class cricketer, representing Hampshire on five occasions between 1900 and 1909.

== Life and naval career ==
The son of an assistant-master at Charterhouse School, he was born in school grounds in December 1872. Evans attended the Britannia Royal Naval College, entering in 1886. After graduating, he was confirmed in the rank of sub-lieutenant in May 1893, antedated to February 1892. He was promoted to lieutenant in June 1894 and was lieutenant in command of HMS Star as part of the Portsmouth instructional flotilla until she paid off at Portsmouth on 31 December 1900, and on the following day he and the crew transferred to HMS Electra. It was in 1900, that Evans made his debut in first-class cricket for Hampshire, with him playing two matches in the County Championship against Warwickshire and Sussex at Portsmouth. He had previously played minor matches for the Royal Navy and the United Services. It was noted by Wisden that his cricket was restricted by his naval career.

Evans was promoted to commander in June 1905. In September 1902, he was posted to the Naval School of Telegraphy at HMS Victory for a signals course, and from 12 November 1902 he was posted as first lieutenant on the battleship HMS Venerable on her first commission, to the Mediterranean Fleet. He resumed playing first-class cricket for Hampshire in 1909, making three appearances, which included playing against the touring Australians at Southampton. In five first-class matches, he scored 67 runs at an average of 11.16, with a highest score of 18 not out. In January 1910, he was placed in command of HMS Pandora at Cape of Good Hope Station. He was appointed a Fourth Class Member of the Royal Victorian Order in January 1911, in recognition of his role in the visit to South Africa by the Duke of Connaught, who opened the 1st South African Parliament at Cape Town in November 1910; upon the opening, Pandora, commanded by Evans, fired a salute.

Evans was the subject of a number of reprimands during his naval career. The first of these happened in early 1912, when he was chastised after a bad gun layer's test on Pandora manifested a "want of supervision of training and organisation for war disclosed in report." He was returned to the United Kingdom aboard SS Themistocles to explain himself before the Admiralty, sending a letter of explanation ahead. It was the view of the Admiralty that the explanation offered in the letter did not fully exonerate him. Despite this, he was placed in command of HMS Minerva in July 1912, however this appointment was superseded in August by his attendance of a war course which ran until December 1912. Evans was promoted to captain in June 1913, and was appointed in command of HMS Europa. Only a matter of months into his command, Evans was reprimanded in the name of the Board of Admiralty and placed on half-pay for twelve months after a report on the "unsatisfactory manner in which he performed executive duties in Europa".

Evans served in the First World War, being appointed captain of the armed merchant cruiser HMS Macedonia in August 1914. The ship later took part in the Battle of the Falkland Islands on 8 December 1914. From March 1917, he commanded the battleship HMS Implacable, until she returned to the United Kingdom and paid off in July 1917 at Portsmouth to provide crews for anti-submarine vessels. From April 1918, he was appointed to command HMS Leviathan. In October 1918, there was a mutiny of sorts aboard the ship when large numbers of her crew disembarked without orders; Evans was adjudged to have been to blame for the incident and was relieved of his command two months later. After a period commanding the naval base at Moudros, he was reappointed as captain of Europa in January 1919; however, whilst undertaking his journey to the ship to take command, Evans was afflicted by Spanish flu and succumbed to the disease at a Paris hospital on 2 March 1919. He is buried at the City of Paris Cemetery.
