= Fervent-class destroyer =

Subclass of the A-class destroyers

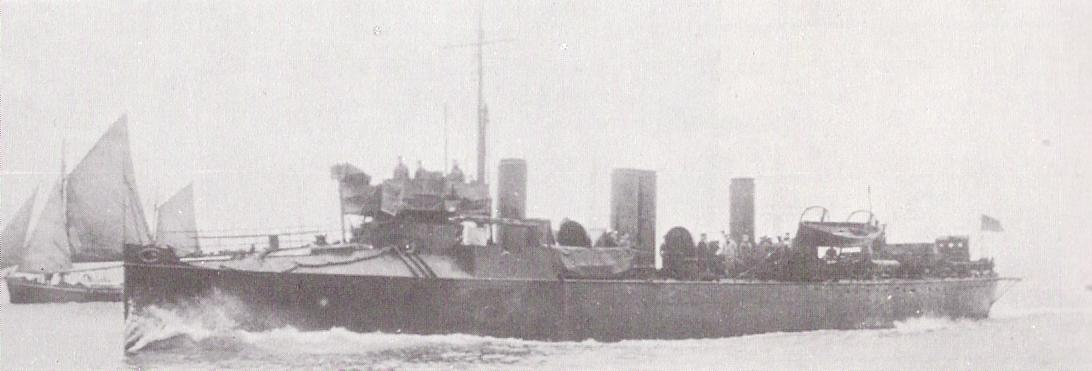
- HMS Zephyr with four funnels, after reboilering and the addition of three funnels.

Class overview
- Name: Fervent class
- Builders: Hanna, Donald & Wilson, Paisley
- Operators: Royal Navy
- Preceded by: Banshee class
- Succeeded by: Conflict class
- Built: 1895
- In commission: 1901–1920
- Completed: 2
- Scrapped: 2

General characteristics
- Type: Torpedo Boat Destroyer
- Displacement: 275 long tons (279 t)
- Length: 200 ft (61 m)
- Propulsion: 3,850 shp (2,871 kW)
- Speed: 27 knots (50 km/h; 31 mph)
- Complement: 53
- Armament: 1 × 12-pounder gun; 2 × torpedo tubes

Two Fervent-class destroyers served with the Royal Navy.

Under the 1893–1894 Naval Estimates, the British Admiralty placed orders for 36 torpedo-boat destroyers, all to be capable of 27 knots (50 km/h; 31 mph), the "27-knotters", as a follow-on to the six prototype "26-knotters" ordered in the previous 1892–1893 Estimates. As was typical for torpedo craft at the time, the Admiralty left detailed design to the builders, laying down only broad requirements.

HMS Fervent and HMS Zephyr were designed and built by Hanna Donald in 1895. The ships displaced 275 tons and were 200 feet (61 m) long. Their locomotive (later Reed) boilers generated 3,850 shp (2,870 kW) which produced a top speed of between 26 and 27 knots. As was usual with ships of their type, they carried one 12-pounder, two torpedo tubes and had a complement of 53 officers and men.

Both ships served in home waters. They originally were designed with one funnel but when they failed to reach their contract speed they were reboilered with four funnels. Due to these problems, the ships did not leave their builders until 1901.

In September 1913 the Admiralty re-classed all the surviving 27-knotter destroyers, including Fervent and Zephyr as A Class destroyers.

== See also ==
- A-class destroyer (1913)
