= Abbey Bridge =

Bridge in Paisley, Scotland

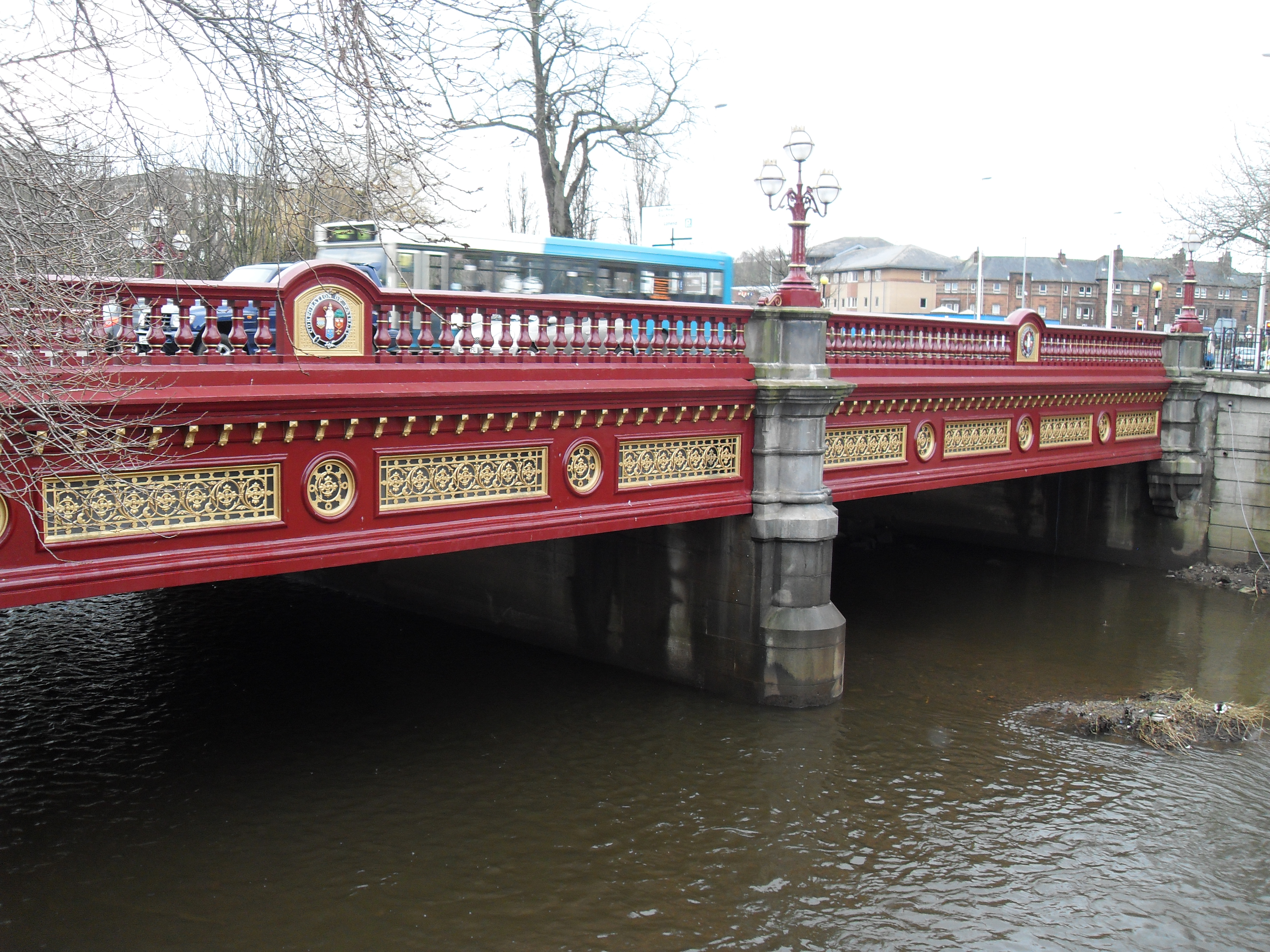
- The current 1879 Abbey Bridge after its 2009 refurbishment
- Coordinates: 55.84385°N 4.42064°W
- OS grid reference: NS 48528 63823
- Crosses: White Cart Water
- Locale: Renfrewshire

Characteristics
- Design: Beam
- Material: Steel
- No. of spans: 2

History
- Built: 1879
- Replaces: Stone bridge c. 1763

Listed Building – Category B
- Official name: Abbey Bridge
- Designated: 27 March 1985
- Reference no.: LB38907

Location
- Interactive map of Abbey Bridge

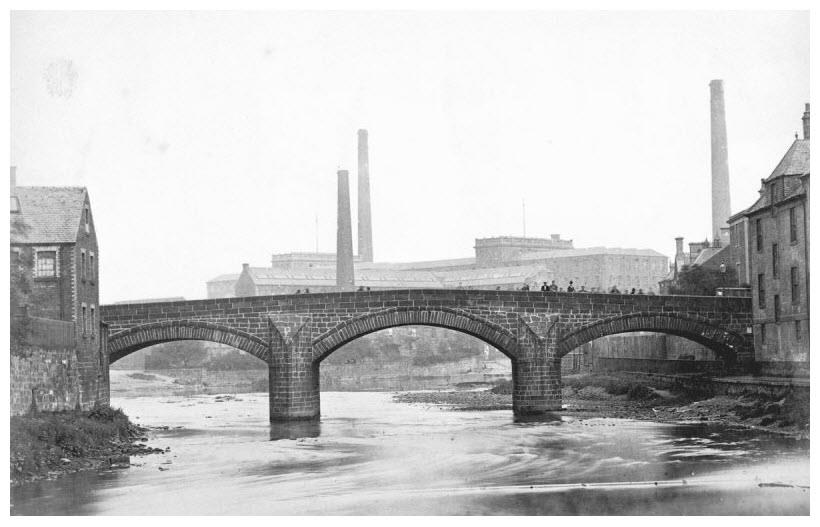
The c.1763 Abbey Bridge

Abbey Bridge is grade B listed road-bridge over the White Cart Water in the centre of Paisley in Scotland. It was erected in 1879, widened in 1933, and comprehensively restored in 2009.

== Description ==
Abbey Bridge connects the south of central Paisley with the area around Paisley Abbey, carrying Bridge Street over the White Carr Water to connect with Cotton Street. It is a beam bridge having two 16.5 meters (54 ft) spans resting at each extreme on masonry-faced concrete abutments, and supported in the centre by a slender masonry pier. The roadway superstructure comprises six steel-plate girders, whilst the footpaths are supported by Warren trusses originally of wrought iron, but latterly of steel plate. The bridge has ornamented parapets incorporating polychrome reliefs of the town’s arms; and facias, originally of cast iron, but latterly replaced by ductile iron cast from the patterns of the originals, on which are mounted gothic lamps manufactured by the Saracen Foundry.

The current Abbey Bridge replaces a 3-arch stone-built bridge dating to around 1763. The new bridge was manufactured by a local shipbuilding company, Hanna, Donald & Wilson and erected in 1879; in 1933 it was widened. In 2009 it was refurbished in a £1.5 million, 6-month project by Raynesway Construction Ltd., involving replacement of the truss sections, parapets and fascias in modern materials, but faithful to the original design; and blast-cleaning and painting of the original superstructure. The re-opened bridge, incorporating programmable-colour architectural lighting, has been painted red with gilt highlighting to replace a prior uniform grey colour scheme.

The bridge is classed by Historic Environment Scotland as a Grade B structure, denoting "buildings of regional or more than local importance, or major examples of some particular period, style or building type which may have been altered."

== See also ==
- List of listed buildings in Paisley, Renfrewshire
- List of bridges in Scotland
