= Hanna, Donald & Wilson =

Scottish engineering and shipbuilding firm

Hanna, Donald and Wilson
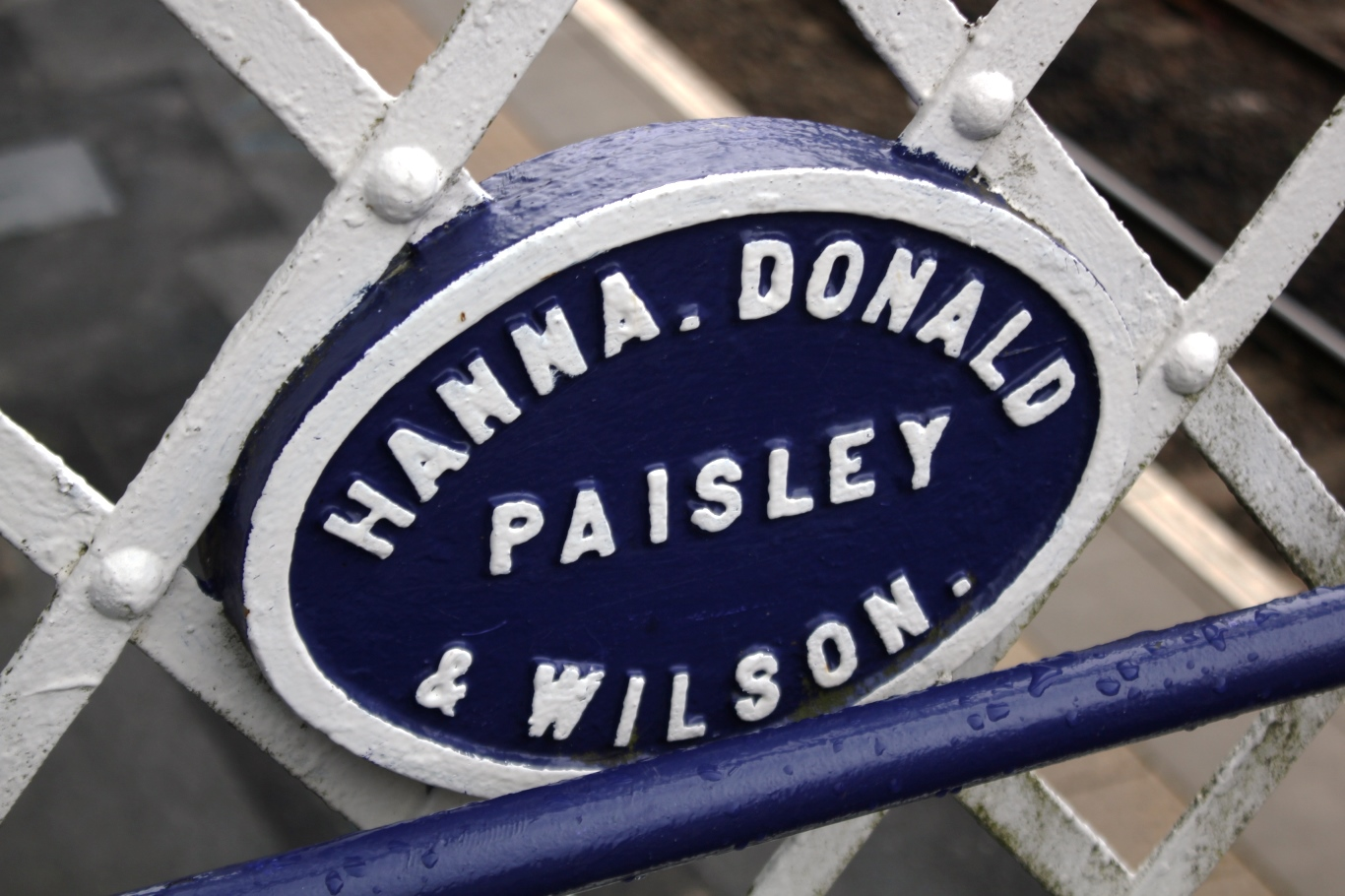
- Manufacturer's plate on a pedestrian bridge at Pitlochry railway station
- Industry: Engineering, shipbuilding
- Founded: 1816 as Reid & Hanna
- Defunct: 1920
- Headquarters: Paisley, Scotland, UK

Hanna, Donald and Wilson were a Scottish engineering and shipbuilding firm which flourished in the Victorian era.

== Reid & Hanna ==
The general engineering firm of Reid & Hanna was founded in 1816 in Paisley, Scotland. Paisley had become an important industrial town in the late 18th century. By the mid-19th century weaving would become the town's principal industry. Of course the textile industry created opportunities for local machine factories and / or repair shops. Reid & Hanna might have been a company that just catered to the needs of the local textiles industry.

Paisley was also a traditional center for shipbuilding. It is connected to the Clyde by the modest River Cart. When ships became too big for the River Cart, the local maritime industry adapted to building small vessels, specialising, or building "knock down" vessels. In July 1834 Reid & Hanna were reported to have finished a very beautiful sheet iron gig for use on the Paisley Canal, together with Walker firm. Two others were under construction for Dublin. In late 1834 the company launched a 70 feet boat with an unloaded draught of 6 inches, for trade on the canals. Due to the bends in the canal it could not be launched at Reid & Hanna's. The two parts were assembled and launched at Saucel wharf, also in Paisley.

Reid & Hanna built 9 boats between about 1832 and 1849; from 1833 to 1836 they were built at their Bay of Quick Yard.

== Hanna & Donald ==
James Donald became a partner in the firm in 1851, and so the firm incorporated his name and became Hanna & Donald.

== Hanna, Donald & Wilson ==
William Donald was a younger brother of James Donald, and built ships in the firm of Donald & MacFarlane, later Donald & Co in Glasgow. That business failed in 1868, and Hanna & Donald acquired their Atlas works in Paisley. The same year saw the company commence its shipbuilding operations along with the Abercorn Shipbuilding Co., Paisley. In 1870 the business changed its name to Hanna, Donald & Wilson, and moved its center of operations to the Abercorn Foundry and Abbey Works in Paisley.

In the second half of the nineteenth century the company offered its services as gas and water engineers, iron founders and boiler makers. It supplied civil and mechanical engineering services to a wide range of European countries and countries in the British Empire or Commonwealth across the world as far afield as South East Asia, Canada and Australia.

=== Ships ===
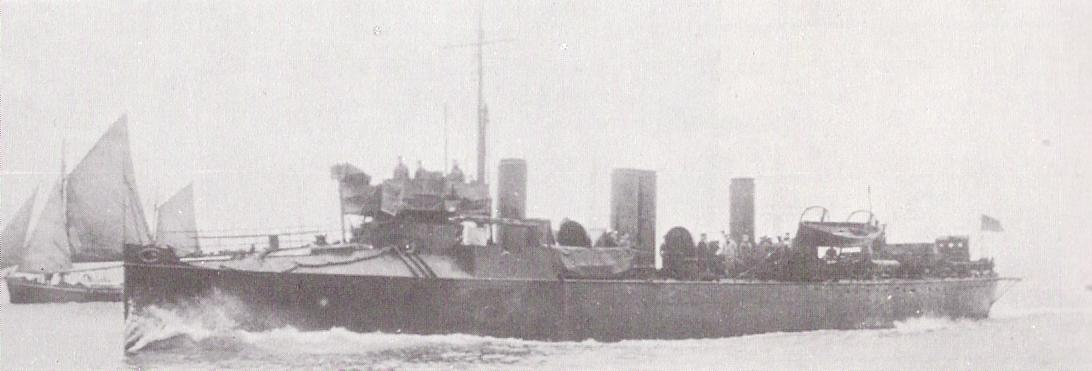
Fervent-class destroyer

Operating from a landlocked site, the shipbuilding department of the company specialized in shallow draught boats for inland waters. Other vessels were delivered to customers in prefabricated sections and reassembled on site. Volharding Dock was a floating dry dock which had her hull finished in Scotland. She left for Java as a sailing ship on 21 July 1875, and arrived there after a journey of 341 days. Batavia Dock of 354 ft (107.9 m) was built in Scotland and re-assembled in the Dutch East Indies. She was launched there, but sank when she was lowered for a test, probably because of the lack of skill and experience in the riveting which was required to properly assemble such a structure.

The company also built high speed naval vessels, including two Fervent-class destroyers, for the Royal Navy and similar boats for the Greek Navy. The Fervent-class destroyers would land the company in big trouble, because it was not able to give these the required speed.

At least 114 ships were built at the yard, 4 by Donald & McFarlane in 1867, 4 by Hanna & Donald between 1868 and 1869, 8 by Hanna, Donald & Wilson between 1869 and 1874 and 98 by Abercorn Shipbuilding Co between 1874 and 1913.

=== Bridges ===
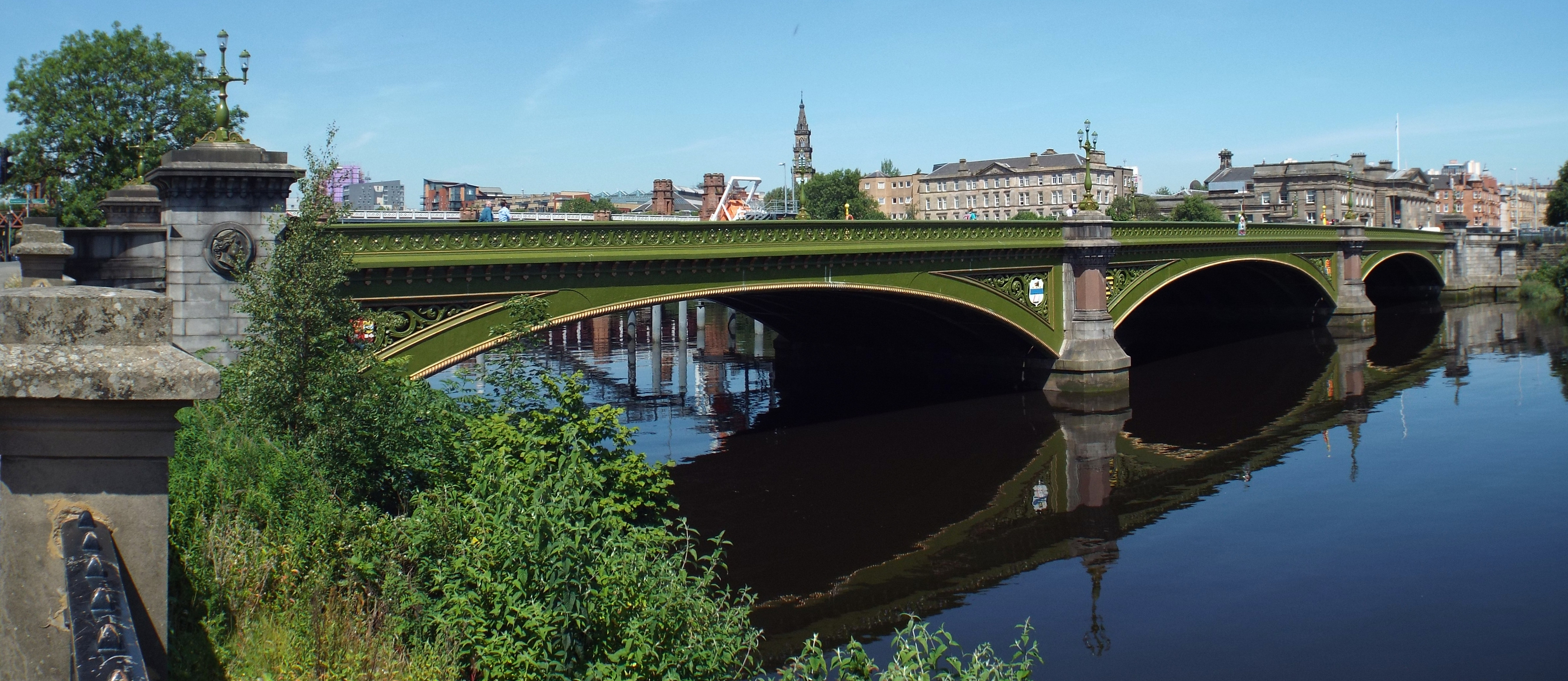
Albert bridge, Glasgow

The company also built many bridges and similar structures. Examples of bridges built by the company are Albert Bridge, Glasgow, Abbey Bridge in its hometown Paisley, the pedestrian bridge at the former Strathbungo railway station (now in Glasgow), and a pedestrian bridge at Pitlochry railway station.

=== Roofing ===
Hanna, Donald & Wilson worked on many iron and steel roofs for railway stations and other large structures. Hanna built the Mavisbank shed in Glasgow Harbor, the roofs for the Elphinstone docks in Mumbai, and that of St Enoch Station in Glasgow.

The glass roof of Waverley Station in Edinburgh was a special case. When it was built it spanned two areas. One was of 6,288 square yards, and the other of 6,840 square yards, which was immense for the time. At about the same time a nearby vegetable market was spanned by a roof of 393 feet by 150 feet. The glass roof of the station was later changed and extended. In 2010-2012, the surface was 34,000 m2 (370,000 sq ft). In these years the glazing of the station roof was entirely replaced with new strengthened clear glass panels.

=== Gasworks and gas services ===
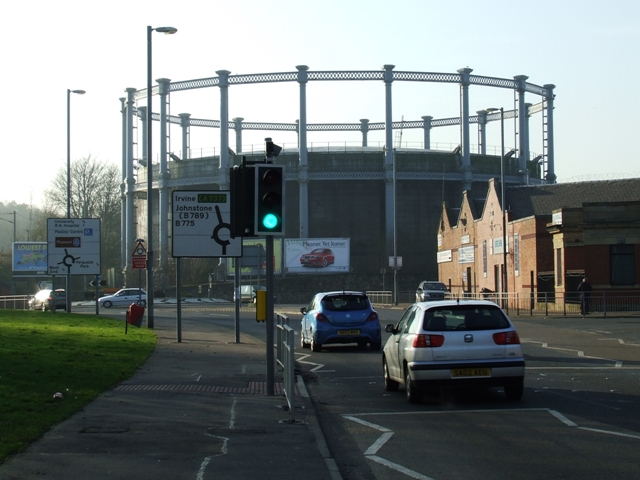
The gas holder in Paisley

The international character of the company especially applied to the construction of gasworks. For the Continental Union Gas Company Hanna built gas works in 13 cities, mainly in Italy. For the European Gas Company Hanna built in Le Havre, Rouen and Caen. For the Malta and Mediterranean Gas company in Valetta, Trapani, Corfu and Marsala. Hanna was also involved or built gasworks in Amsterdam, Bucharest, Kharkiv, Brisbane and Melbourne.

In Britain the company did work for the Crystal Palace Gas Works Company, the Royal Arsenal at Woolwich, the Military College at Sandhurst, and some 50–60 other towns in the United Kingdom. In Scotland itself Hanna, Donald & Wilson was involved in Glasgow, Paisley, Greenock, Aberdeen, Edinburgh and Leith. For the Glasgow Gas Works Hanna built four gas holders of a capacity of 1,250,000 cubic feet (35,000 m^{3}) of gas.

The Gasholder in its home town Paisley was also built by Hanna, and completed in 1890. The tank was built by James Goldie and Son of Glasgow. It had a 1,390,000 ft^{3} (39,000 m^{3}) capacity, and is held by 18 cast iron columns 75 feet 6 inches (23.01 m) in height and 5 ft 0 in (1.52 m) at the base. The structure is now a listed building Paisley, Well Street, Gasholder. This was not the first gasometer in Paisley, because in 1853, the company had also opened such a work.

== The end ==
When William Donald decided to pursue a career in medicine the company came to an end. The engineering and shipbuilding companies were wound up in the 1910s. The last asset, the Abercorn ship yard, was sold off in 1920.
