= Ferret-class destroyer =

Subclass of the A-class destroyers

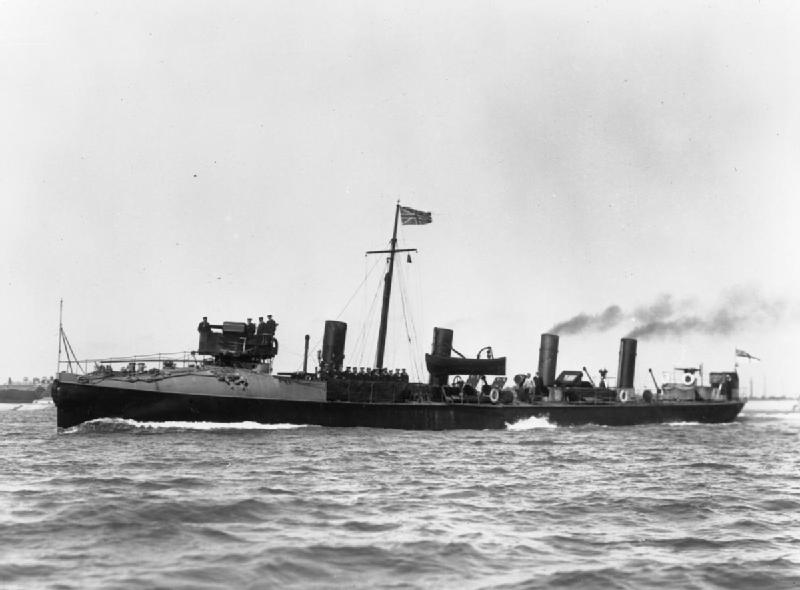
- Ferret

Class overview
- Builders: Cammell Laird
- Operators: Royal Navy
- Preceded by: Havock-class destroyer
- Succeeded by: Ardent-class destroyer
- Built: 1893–1894
- In commission: 1893–1912
- Completed: 2
- Scrapped: 2

General characteristics
- Type: Torpedo boat destroyer
- Displacement: 280 long tons (284 t)
- Length: 199 ft (61 m) overall; 195 ft (59 m) between perpendiculars
- Beam: 19 ft 3 in (5.87 m)
- Propulsion: 2 sets triple expansion
- Speed: 26 knots contract (27 actual)
- Complement: 42 (later 53)
- Armament: 1 × 12 pounder gun; 3 × 6-pounder guns; 3 (later 2) × 18-inch torpedo tubes

Two Ferret-class destroyers served with the Royal Navy. Ferret and Lynx were built by Laird, displaced 280 tons and were 199 feet (61 m) in overall length.

== Armament ==
They were armed with one 12-pounder and three 6-pounder guns, and three torpedo tubes (two on deck mounts and one fixed bow tube). The bow tube was soon removed, and provision was made for removing the deck tubes and substituting two extra 6-pounder guns. They carried a complement of 42 (later raised to 53).

== Background ==
The invention of the self-propelled torpedo in the 1860s, combined with the introduction of small fast torpedo boats posed a threat to battleships: large numbers of torpedo boats could overwhelm a battleship's defences and sink it, or distract the battleship and make it vulnerable to opposing capital ships. Torpedo boats proved devastatingly effective in the 1891 Chilean Civil War.

The defence against torpedo boats was clear: small warships accompanying the fleet that could screen and protect it from attack by torpedo boats. Several European navies developed vessels variously known as torpedo boat "catchers", "hunters" and "destroyers", while the Royal Navy itself operated torpedo gunboats. However, the early designs lacked the range and speed to keep up with the fleet they were supposed to protect. In 1892, the Third Sea Lord, Rear Admiral Jackie Fisher ordered the development of a new type of ships equipped with the then novel water-tube boilers and quick-firing small calibre guns.

== Orders ==
Six ships to the specifications circulated by the Admiralty were ordered initially, comprising three different designs each produced by a different shipbuilder:

- HMS Havock and HMS Hornet from Yarrow (the Havock class).
- HMS Daring and HMS Decoy from John I. Thornycroft & Company (the Daring class)
- HMS Ferret and HMS Lynx from Laird, Son & Company .

== Design ==
These boats all featured a turtleback (i.e. rounded) forecastle that was characteristic of early British TBDs. All six of them were removed from service and disposed of by the end of 1912, and thus were not affected by the Admiralty decision in 1913 to group all the surviving 27-knot and 30-knot destroyers (which had followed on these six 26-knot vessels) into four heterogeneous classes, labelled "A", "B", "C" and "D" classes.

The Ferret-class destroyers were followed by the larger Banshee class which were built by Lairds less than a year later.

== Bibliography ==
- Chesneau, Roger & Kolesnik, Eugene M., eds. (1979). Conway's All The World's Fighting Ships 1860–1905. London: Conway Maritime Press. ISBN 0-85177-133-5.
- Colledge, J. J.; Warlow, Ben (2006) [1969]. Ships of the Royal Navy: The Complete Record of All Fighting Ships of the Royal Navy from the 15th Century to the Present (3rd Rev ed.). London: Chatham Publishing. ISBN 978-1-86176-281-8. OCLC 67375475.
- Friedman, Norman (2009). British Destroyers: From Earliest Days to the Second World War. Barnsley, UK: Seaforth Publishing. ISBN 978-1-84832-049-9.
- Gardiner, Robert & Gray, Randal, eds. (1985). Conway's All The World's Fighting Ships 1906–1921. London: Conway Maritime Press. ISBN 0-85177-245-5.
- Lyon, David (2001) [1996]. The First Destroyers. London: Caxton Editions. ISBN 1-84067-364-8.
- Manning, T. D. (1961). The British Destroyer. Putnam & Co. OCLC 6470051.
- March, Edgar J. (1966). British Destroyers: A History of Development, 1892–1953; Drawn by Admiralty Permission From Official Records & Returns, Ships' Covers & Building Plans. London: Seeley Service. OCLC 164893555.
