= HMS Hornet =

Ten ships and one shore establishment of the British Royal Navy have been named HMS Hornet, after the insect:

- HMS Hornet (1745), a 14-gun sloop launched in 1745. She was in French hands between 1746 and 1747, and was sold in 1770.
- HMS Hornet (1763), a 16-gun cutter purchased in 1763 and sold in 1772.
- HMS Hornet (1776), a 14-gun sloop launched in 1776 and sold in 1791.
- HMS Hornet (1794 sloop-of-war), a 16-gun sloop launched in 1794, hospital ship from 1805 to 1811, and sold in 1817.
- HMS Hornet (1794 gunvessel), a 4-gun Dutch hoy purchased as a gunvessel in 1794 and broken up in 1795.
- HMS Hornet (1831), a 6-gun schooner launched in 1831 and completed as a brigantine. She was broken up in 1845.
- HMS Hornet (1854), a wooden Cruizer-class screw sloop, initially ordered as a schooner, launched in 1854 and broken up in 1868.
- HMS Hornet (1868), a composite Beacon-class screw gunvessel launched in 1868 and sold in 1889.
- HMS Hornet (1893), a Havock-class destroyer launched in 1893 and broken up in 1909.
- HMS Hornet (1911), an Acheron-class destroyer launched in 1911 and broken up in 1921.
- HMS Hornet (shore establishment), a stone frigate, a Coastal Forces Base at Gosport formed around 1941 and disbanded in 1956.
