= Three-drum boiler =

Compact furnace with two side water drums and one steam drum above

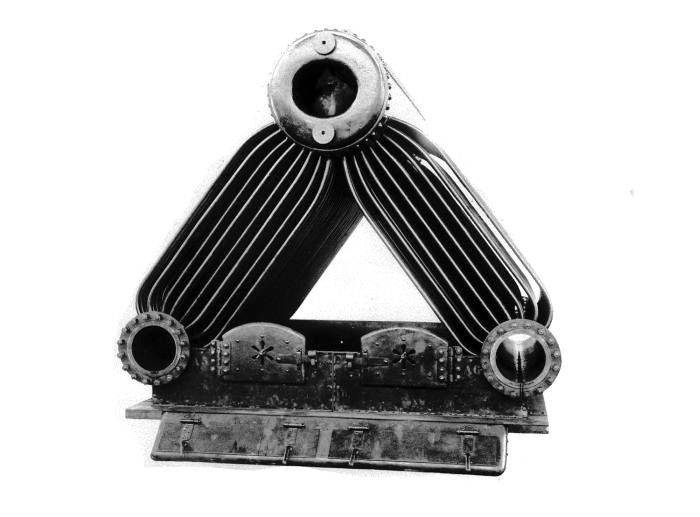
Three-drum boiler, casing removed

Three-drum boilers are a class of water-tube boiler used to generate steam, typically to power ships. They are compact and of high evaporative power, factors that encourage this use. Other boiler designs may be more efficient, although bulkier, and so the three-drum pattern was rare as a land-based stationary boiler.

The fundamental characteristic of the "three-drum" design is the arrangement of a steam drum above two water drums, in a triangular layout. Water tubes fill in the two sides of this triangle between the drums, and the furnace is in the centre. The whole assembly is then enclosed in a casing, leading to the exhaust flue.

Firing can be by either coal or oil. Many coal-fired boilers used multiple firedoors and teams of stokers, often from both ends.

== Development ==
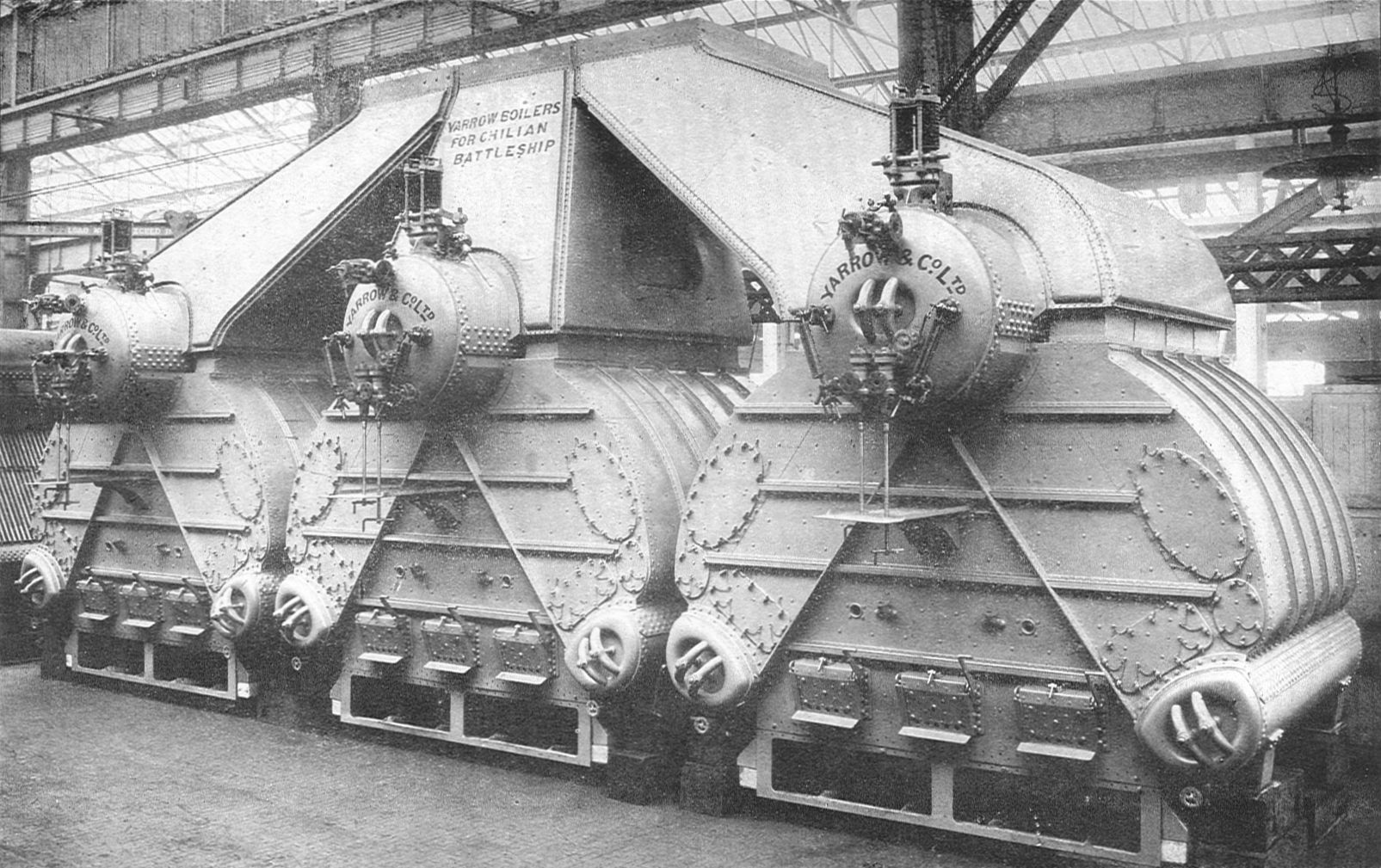
A flat of three Yarrow boilers

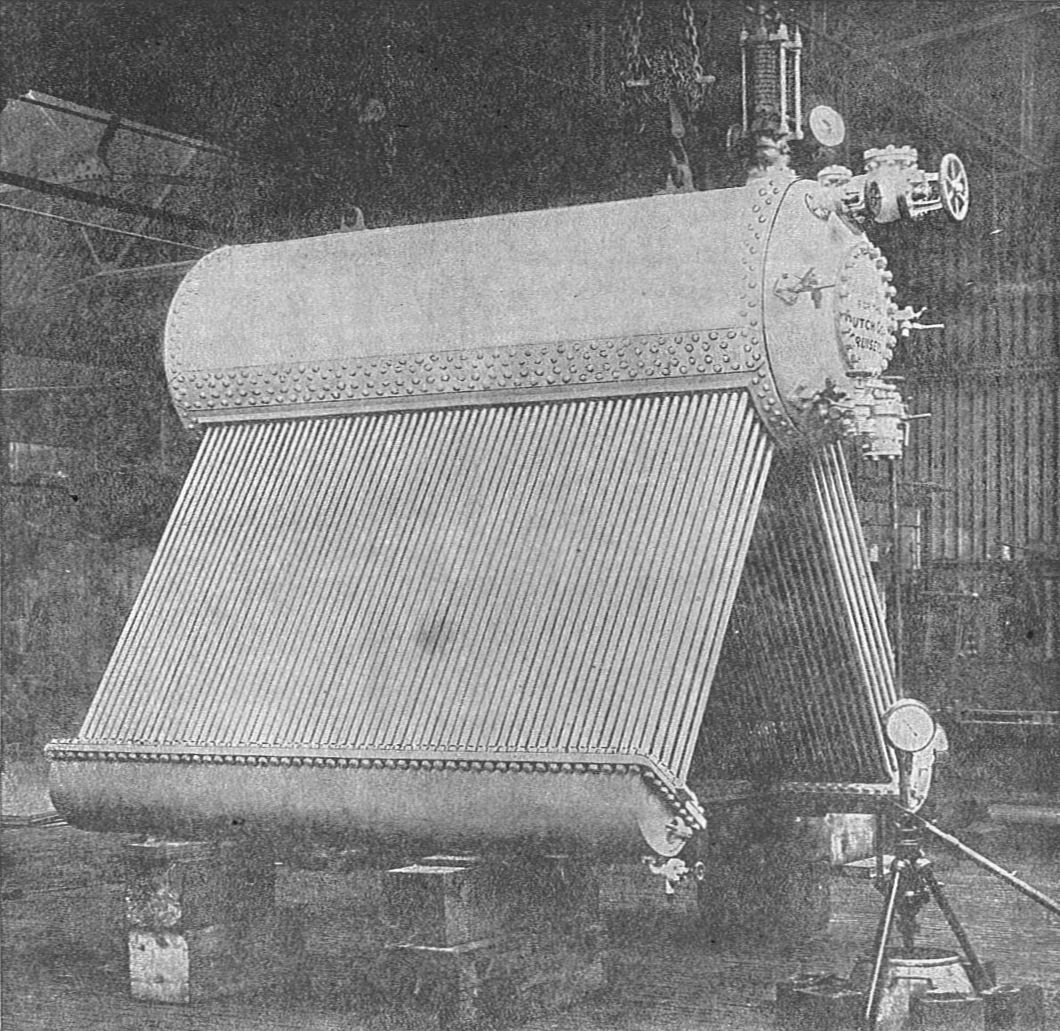
A Yarrow boiler, with the casing removed

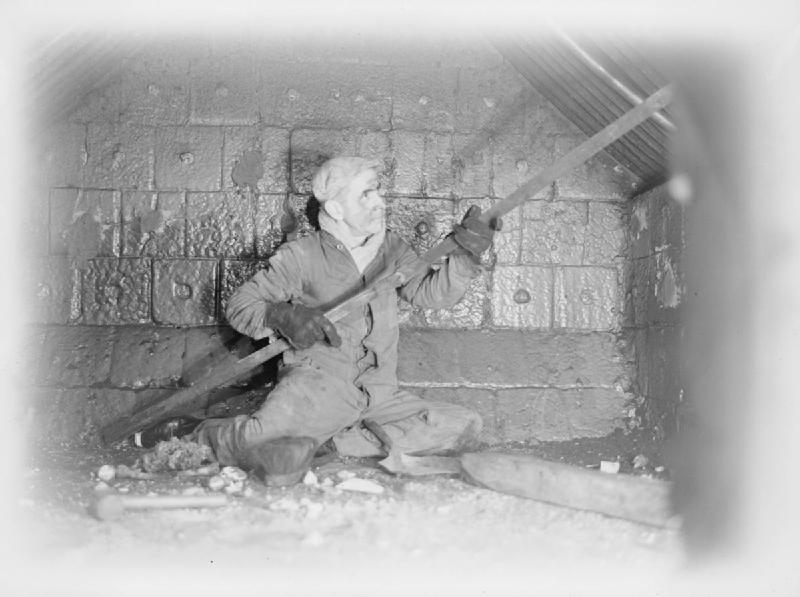
A Royal Navy sailor cleans the water tubes inside a ship's boiler with a ribbon brush, c. 1939–1945.

Development of the three-drum boiler began in the late 19th century, with the demand from naval ships that required high power and a compact boiler. The move to water-tube boilers had already begun, with designs such as the Babcock & Wilcox or the Belleville. The three-drum arrangement was lighter and more compact for the same power.

The new generation of "small-tube" water-tube boilers used water-tubes of around 2 inches (5 cm) diameter, compared to older designs of 3 or 4 inches. This gave a greater ratio of tube surface heating area to the tube volume, thus more rapid steaming. These small-tube boilers also became known as "express" boilers. Although not all of these were three-drum designs (notably the Thornycroft), most were some variation of this. As the tubes of the three-drum are close to vertical (compared to the Babcock & Wilcox), this encourages strong circulation by the thermosyphon effect, further encouraging steaming.

The development of the three-drum pattern was generally one of simplification, rather than increasing complexity or sophistication. Even the first boilers packed a large heating area into a compact volume, their difficulty was in manufacturing and particularly for their maintenance on-board ship.

=== Tubes ===
The convoluted tubes of early designs such as the du Temple and Normand were the first to go. A multi-row bank of tubes could provide adequate heating area, without this complexity. Tubes also became straighter, mostly to ease their cleaning. Yarrow had demonstrated that straight tubes did not cause any problems with expansion, but circular drums and perpendicular tube entry were both valuable features for a long service life. Where tubes entered drums at an angle, heating and cooling tended to bend the tube back and forth, leading to leaks. A perpendicular entry was easier to expand the tubes for a reliable seal and to avoid these sideways stresses. It was worth the compromise of the Admiralty boiler's bent tube ends to keep these two features, and these tubes were still simple enough in shape to clean easily.

Some of the first boiler tubes, particularly the du Temple with its sharp corners, could not be cleaned of scale internally. Tubes were later cleaned internally by attempting to pass a hinged rod through, with a brush at the end. For the curved tube designs, often only part of the tube could be reached. Another method was to pass a chain down the tube from above, pulling a brush behind it, although this was unworkable for boilers like the Thornycroft where the tubes first travelled horizontally or upwards. The eventual method was to use 'bullet' brushes that were fired from one drum into the other by use of compressed air. Sets of brushes were used, one for each tube, and they were carefully numbered and counted afterwards to ensure that none had been left behind, blocking a tube.

=== Downcomers ===
Separate downcomers were used by most designs, even after Yarrow's experiments had demonstrated that circulation could still take place amongst the heated tubes alone. Again, the Admiralty boiler (which omitted downcomers) was the culmination of this approach, placing the superheater within the tube bank, so as to encourage the necessary temperature difference.

=== Furnaces ===
The Admiralty boiler is usually considered to be a direct evolution of the Yarrow, although the White–Forster also had an influence, probably as a result of the large number in service with the Royal Navy. The circular water drums, and their raising above the furnace floor, are White–Forster features. The first reduces the risk of grooving, the latter is appropriate for oil firing.

== Types ==
=== du Temple boiler ===
The Du Temple was an early naval water-tube boiler, patented in 1876. It was invented by Félix du Temple in France and was tested in a Royal Navy torpedo gunboat. Water tubes were convoluted, arranged in four rows to a bank, and S-shaped with sharp right angle bends. This packed a large tube heating area into a small volume, but made tube cleaning impractical. The drums were cylindrical, with perpendicular tube entry and external downcomers between them.

=== White–Forster boiler ===
The White–Forster was of simple construction, with tubes that had only a gentle curvature to them. This was sufficient to allow them to be replaced in-situ, working through the manhole at the end of the large steam drum. Each tube was sufficiently curved to allow it to be extracted through the steam drum, but sufficiently straight that a single tube could be replaced from a tube bank, without requiring other tubes to be removed so as to permit access. This was one of many features of the White–Forster intended to make it reliable in naval service and easy to maintain. These tubes were of particularly small diameter, only 1 inch (2.5 cm) and especially numerous, a total of 3,744 being used in some boilers. The tubes were arranged in 24 rows to a bank, each requiring a different length of tube, and 78 rows per drum. All tubes were curved to the same radius, facilitating repair and replacement on board, but requiring the tube holes in the drums to be reamed to precise angles on a jig during manufacture. This small tube diameter gave a high heating surface, but probably too much: the ratio of surface to volume became excessive and gas flow through the tube banks was affected, giving the boiler furnaces something of a reputation as poor burners.

Downcomers were used, either the usual two large pipes, or an unusual but characteristic arrangement of four small 4-inch (10 cm) tubes to each drum. This was a feature intended to improve survivability after damage, when used on-board warships. The boiler could remain in service with a damaged downcomer tube plugged.

The mud drums were raised above the floor of the furnace on steel girder stools, increasing the furnace volume available for combustion. This feature was intended to encourage the use of oil burning, an innovation on warships around this time. The general appearance of the White–Forster is similar to that of the later Admiralty pattern. Features such as the raised mud drums and the shape of the tubes were an influence.

White–Forster boilers were introduced into the Royal Navy from 1906, for light cruisers and torpedo boat destroyers.

=== Normand boiler ===
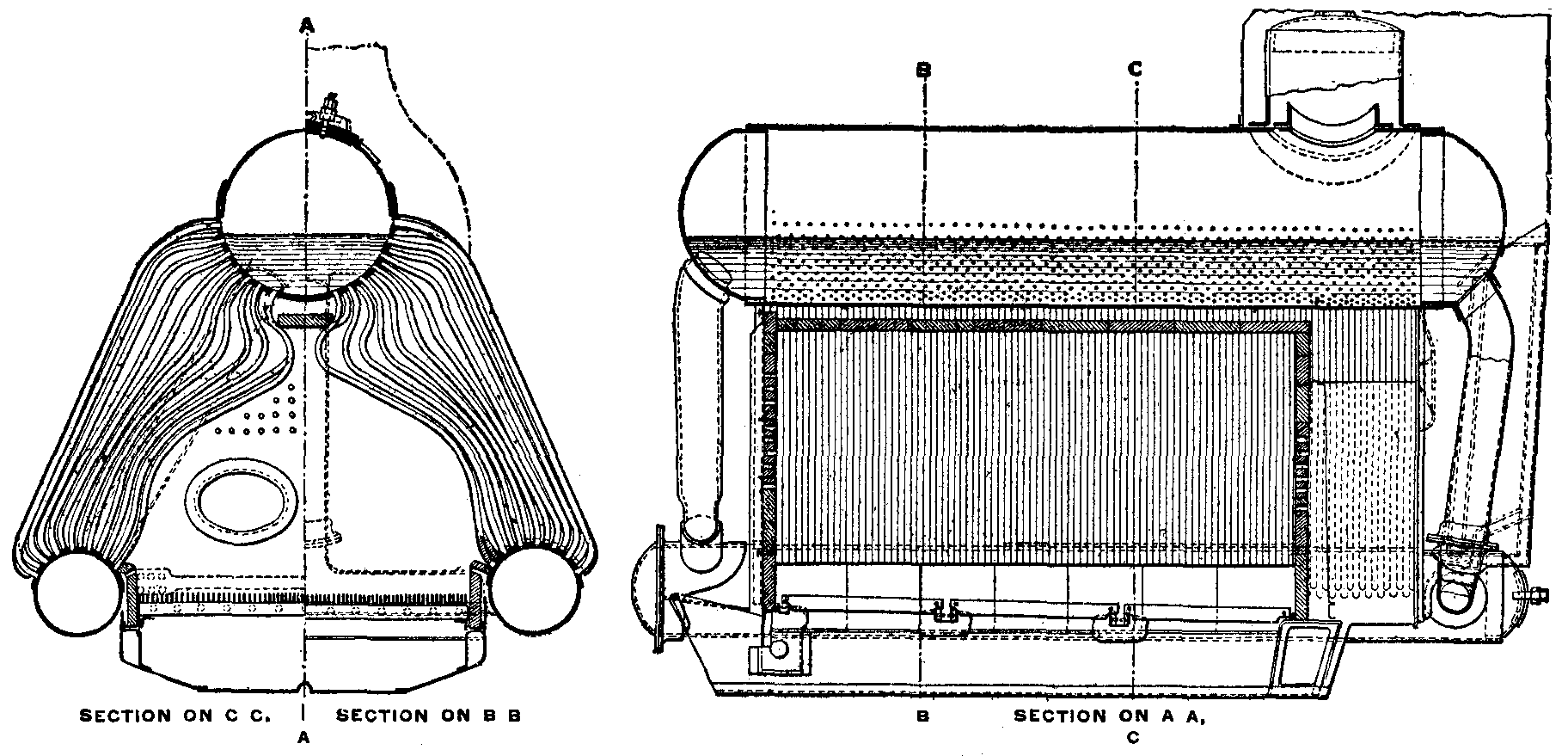
Normand boiler

The Normand boiler was developed by the French Normand shipyard of Le Havre. It was used by the navies of several nations, notably those of France, Russia, Britain and United States. In 1896, the Royal Navy had them installed in twenty-six boats, more than any other water-tube design.

Initial design of the Normand boiler was as a development of the Du Temple, with the sharp corners of the tubes replaced by a smooth radiused bend, but still retaining the S shape.

The design of the Normand gave a particularly large heating area (tube surface area) in relation to the grate area. The cost of this was a dense nest of tubes, where each of the numerous rows of tubes was bent into a different and complex shape. Tube ends entered the cylindrical drums perpendicularly, for good sealing. The space needed for all these tubes filled the entire lower half of the steam drum, requiring both a large drum and a separate steam dome from which to collect dry steam. The external boiler casing entered the flue uptake at one end, usually enclosing this dome. The ends of the drums extended outside the casing as hemispherical domes. Cold downcomers outside the casing linked these drums, providing a path for the return circulation of cold water.

A further development was the Normand-Sigaudy, where two Normand boilers were coupled back-to-back, for use in large ships. This effectively gave a double-ended Normand (as was later common with the Yarrow) that could be fired from both ends.

=== Reed boiler ===
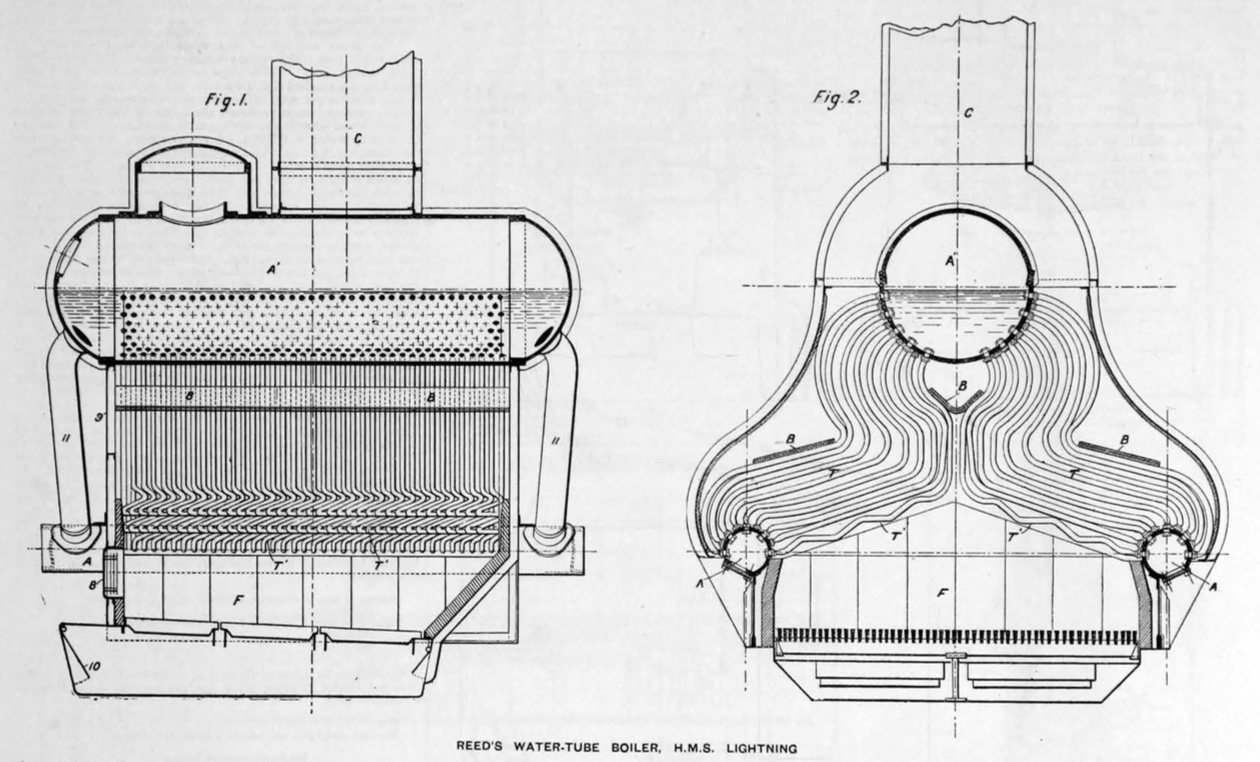
Reed boiler

The Reed boiler was used by Palmers of Jarrow. It was similar to the Normand, with downcomers and curved tubes that entered cylindrical drums perpendicularly.

=== Thornycroft boiler ===
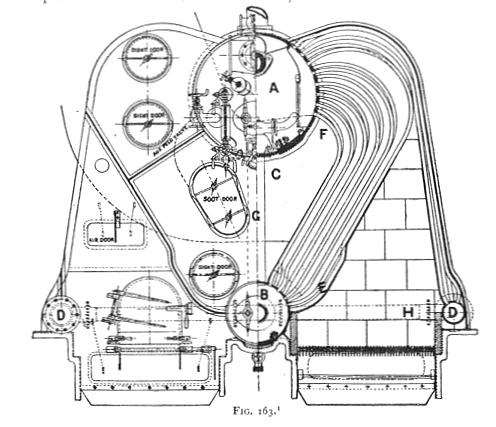
Thornycroft boiler

The Thornycroft boiler is a variant that splits the usual central furnace into two. There are four drums: two main drums vertically in the centre – a steam and a water drum – also two wing drums at the outside edges of the furnace. The design was notable for its early use of the water-wall furnace. The outer bank of tubes was shallow, consisting of only two rows of tubes. These rows were spaced closely, so that the tubes formed a solid wall, without gasflow between them. The inner bank of tubes was similar: the two rows of tubes closest to the furnace formed a similar water wall. These tubes were splayed apart at their base, so as to provide space for gasflow between them. Within the tube bank, gas flow is mostly parallel to the tubes, similar to some early designs, but contrary to the crossflow design of later three-drum boilers. The exhaust gas emerged into the heart-shaped space below the upper central drum, exiting to the funnel through the rear wall.

The steam drum is circular, with perpendicular tube entry. The tube ends span a considerable circumference of the drum, so that the upper tubes enter above the water level. They are thus 'non-drowned' tubes.

The upper and lower central drums are linked by downcomers. Unusually these are internal to the boiler and are heated, although not strongly, by the exhaust gases. They are formed as several (eight or nine) 4-inch (10 cm) vertical tubes on the centreline of the boiler. They are formed into a shallow S-shape to give a little flexibility against thermal expansion. The small wing drums are connected to the lower central drum alone, by large external pipes outside the rear casing of the boiler.

Owing to its early use in the Thornycroft-built destroyer HMS Daring of 1893, this design became known as the 'Daring' boiler.

A small single-sided version of this boiler was also produced for launches. The first small version of this also dispensed with the wing drum, the water-wall tubes bending at right angles and passing back to the central water drum, the tubes also forming the grate to support the fire.

==== Thornycroft–Schulz boiler ====
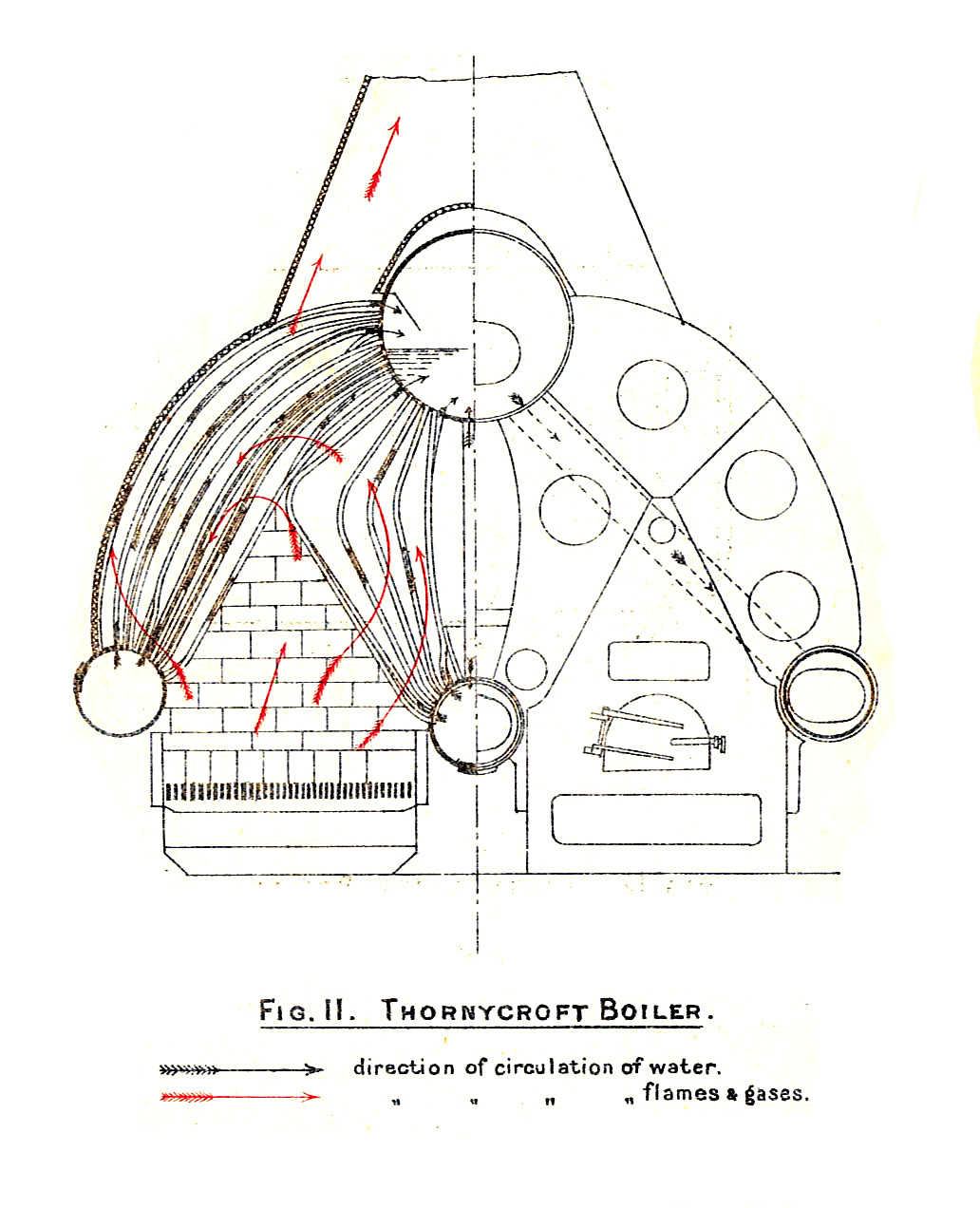
Thornycroft–Schulz boiler

Later designs, the Thornycroft–Schulz pattern, made the outer wings more important. The number of their tubes was increased, such that they became the majority of the heating surface and the main gas path for the exhaust gases. The wing drums became large enough to permit a man access inside, for cleaning and expanding new tubes into place.

The earlier Thornycroft–Marshall design of water-tube boiler used horizontal hairpin water-tubes fitted into sectional headers. It has little relation to the types described here.

=== Yarrow boiler ===
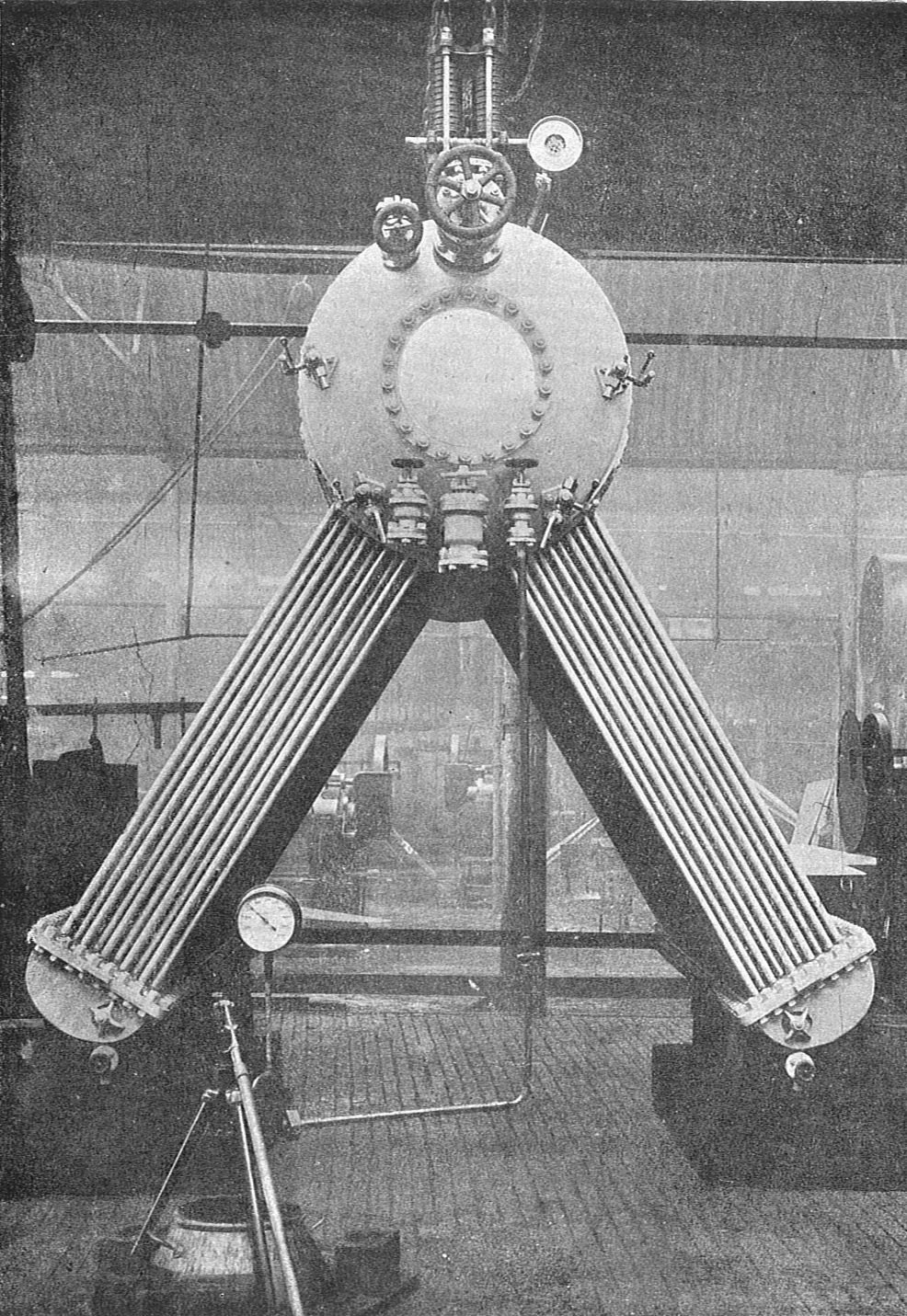
Early Yarrow boiler

The Yarrow boiler design is characterised by its use of straight water-tubes, without downcomers. Circulation, both upwards and downwards, occurs within this same tube bank.

Alfred Yarrow developed his boiler as a response to other water-tube designs, and his perception in 1877 that Yarrow & Co were lagging behind other shipbuilders. His initial thoughts already defined the key features of the design, a three-drum boiler with straight tubes, yet it took ten years of research before the first boiler was supplied for a torpedo boat of 1887.

==== Straight tubes ====
Early water-tube designers had been concerned with the expansion of the boiler's tubes when heated. Efforts were made to permit them to expand freely, particularly so that those closest to the furnace might expand relatively more than those further away. Typically this was done by arranging the tubes in large looping curves. These had difficulties in manufacturing and required support in use.

Yarrow recognised that the temperature of the water-tubes was held relatively low and was consistent amongst them, provided that they remained full of water and boiling was not allowed to occur within the tubes themselves, i.e. they would remain as drowned tubes. High temperatures and variations only arose when tubes became steam filled, which also disrupted circulation.

His conclusion was thus that straight water-tubes were acceptable, and these would have obvious advantages for manufacture and cleaning in service.

==== Yarrow's circulation experiments ====
It was already recognised that a water-tube boiler relied on a continuous flow through the water-tubes, and that this must be by a thermosyphon effect rather than requiring an impractical pump. Forced-circulation boilers with pumps, such as the Velox, did not appear for another thirty years and even then they were initially unreliable. The assumption was that flow through the water-tubes would be upwards, owing to their heating by the furnace, and that the counterbalancing downward flow would require external unheated downcomers.

Alfred Yarrow conducted a famous experiment where he disproved this assumption. A vertical U-shaped tube was arranged so that it could be heated by a series of Bunsen burners on each side.

When only one side of the U was heated, there was the expected upward flow of heated water in that arm of the tube.

When heat was also applied to the unheated arm, conventional theory predicted that the circulatory flow would slow or stop completely. In practice, the flow actually increased. Provided that there was some asymmetry to the heating, Yarrow's experiment showed that circulation could continue and heating of the cooler downcomer could even increase this flow.

The Yarrow boiler could thus dispense with separate external downcomers. Flow was entirely within the heated watertubes, upwards within those closest to the furnace and downwards through those in the outer rows of the bank.

==== Later evolution in design ====
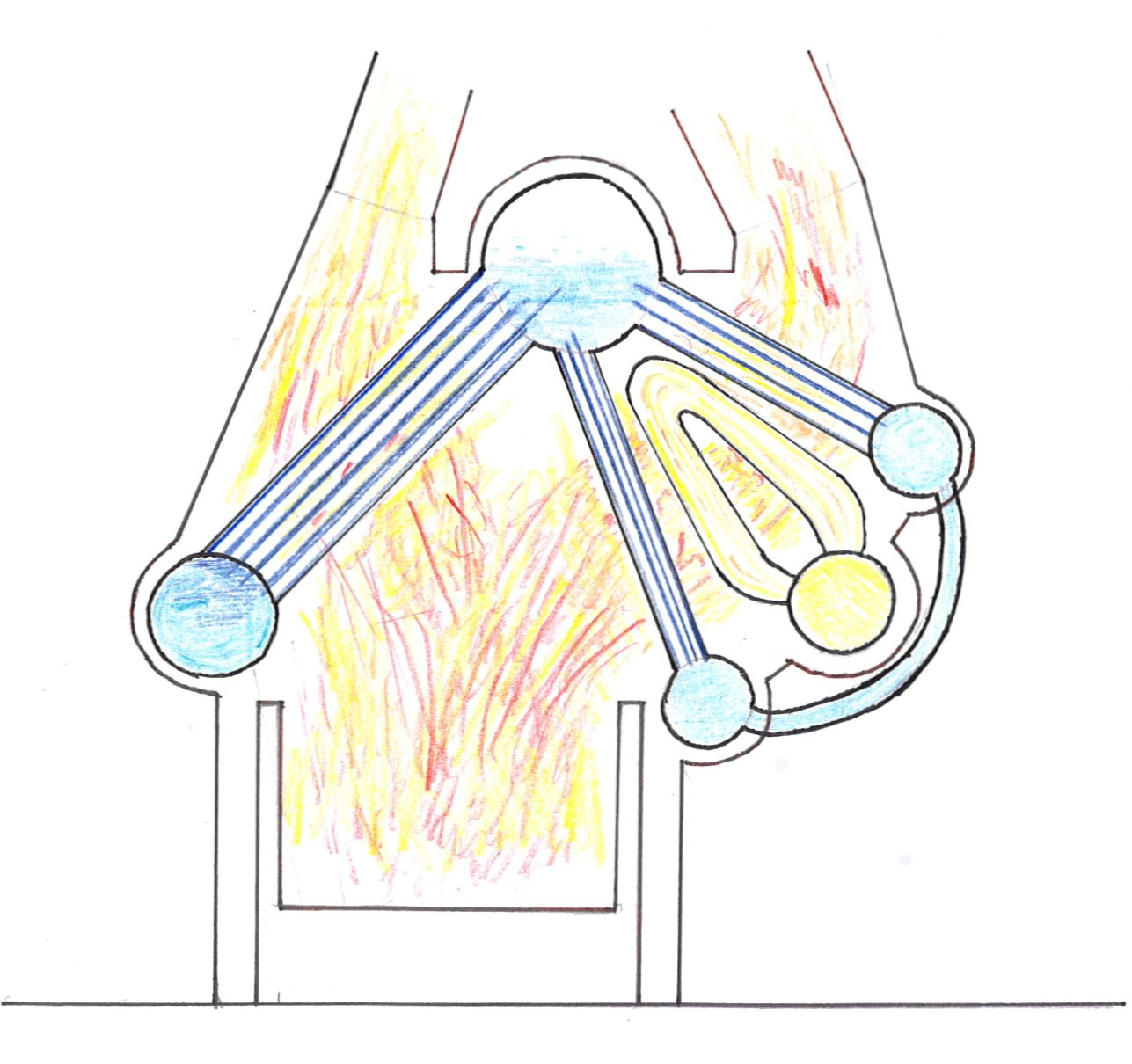
Asymmetric Yarrow boiler, with superheater

===== Water drums =====
The first Yarrow water drums or "troughs" were D-shaped with a flat tubeplate, so as to provide an easy perpendicular mounting for the tubes. The tubeplate was bolted to the trough and could be dismantled for maintenance and tube cleaning.

This D shape is not ideal for a pressure drum though, as pressure will tend to distort it into a more circular section. This flexing led to leakage where the water tubes entered the drum; a problem, termed 'wrapperitis', which was shared with the White–Forster. Experience of boiler explosions had shown that sharp internal corners inside boilers were also prone to erosion by grooving. Later boilers used a more rounded section, although still asymmetrical rather than fully cylindrical.

===== Downcomers =====
The circulation in a Yarrow boiler depended on a temperature difference between the inner and outer tube rows of a bank, and particularly upon the rates of boiling. Whilst this is easy to maintain at low powers, a higher pressure Yarrow boiler will tend to have less temperature difference and thus will have less effective circulation. Some later and higher-pressure boilers were fitted with external downcomers, outside the heated flue area.

===== Superheaters =====
When superheating was adopted, primarily for use with steam turbines after 1900, the first Yarrow boilers placed their superheater coil outside the main tube bank. Later designs became asymmetrical, with the tube bank on one side doubled and a hairpin-tube superheater placed between them.

==== Adoption by the Royal Navy ====
HMS Havock, the lead ship of the Havock class destroyers, was built with the then current form of locomotive boiler; its sister ship HMS Hornet with a Yarrow boiler for comparison. The trials were successful and the Yarrow boiler was adopted for naval service, particularly in small ships. In time the Navy would develop its own Admiralty pattern of three-drum boiler.

=== Mumford boiler ===
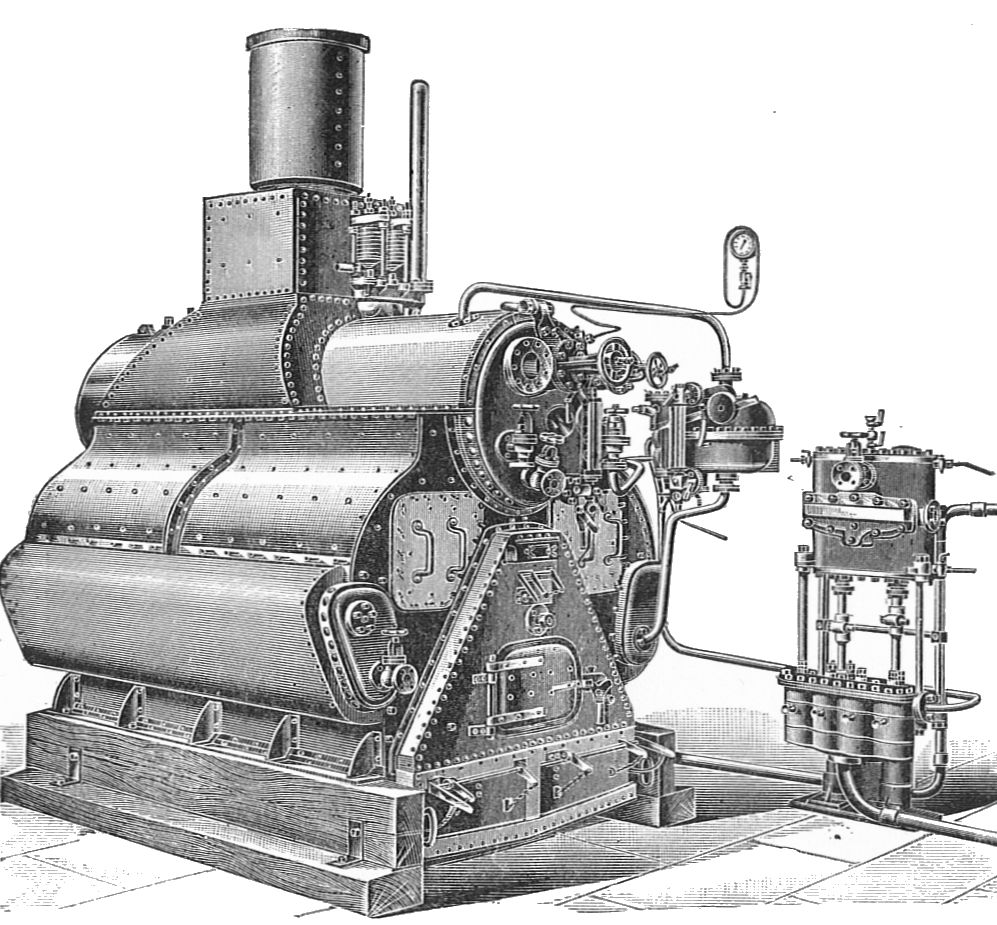
Mumford boiler

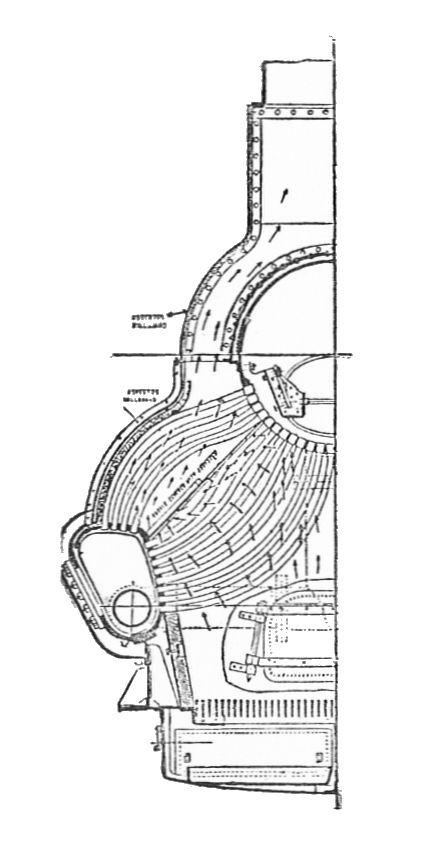
Mumford boiler, half-section showing the shape of the lower water drum

The Mumford boiler was a variety built by the boilermakers Mumford of Colchester, intended for use in smaller boats. The tube banks separated into two groups, with the short tubes slightly curved away from each other. Entry into the lower water drum was perpendicular, requiring an almost rectangular drum with the tubes entering on separate faces. The mechanical weakness of such a shape was acceptable in this small size, but limited the boiler's potential. The casing was small and only enclosed part of the upper steam drum, leading directly to a funnel. A single inverted tee-shaped downcomer linked the drums at the rear of the boiler.

=== Woolnough boiler ===
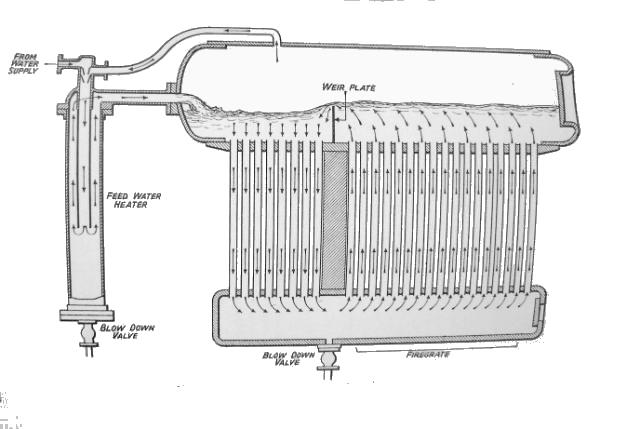
Woolnough boiler, as used by Sentinel

The Woolnough design was used by Sentinel for their larger railway locomotives. It resembled most other three-drum designs, having almost-straight tubes. Its distinguishing feature was a firebrick wall two-thirds of the way down the furnace. The furnace grate was on the longer side of this, with the combustion gases passing out through the tube bank, along inside a steel outer casing, then back within the shorter tube bank. Coiled tube superheaters were placed in the gas flow outside the tubes. The combustion gases thus passed through the tube bank twice, once outwards and then again inwards. A single central chimney exhausted from the centre of the far end, not as usual from outside the tubes. The relative temperature difference between gas passage through the two sections of the bank led to a circulation current that was upwards through the first, hotter, part of the bank and downwards through the further, less hot, bank. Circulation was also controlled by an internal weir plate within the upper water drum, so as to keep a depth of water above the ends of the hotter tubes, thus avoiding overheating of dry tubes.

Sentinel used the Woolnough boiler on a number of their larger locomotives, instead of their usual small vertical boiler. These included railcars for the LNER and LMS. Sentinel's best-known use of the Woolnough was for the 'Colombian' articulated locomotives. These were a series of four, metre gauge locomotives of Co-Co wheel arrangement, built in 1934. They ran at the unusually high pressure of 550 psi (3.8 MPa) and each axle was driven by a separate steam motor, designed by Abner Doble. The first was supplied to Belgian Railways, the following three were built for the Société National des Chemins de Fer en Colombe of Colombia, but first shipped to Belgium for testing. Most photographs that exist of these locomotives were taken in Belgium. Little is known of their history after arrival in Colombia.

=== Admiralty boiler ===
Admiralty three-drum boiler

A later development of the Yarrow was the Admiralty three-drum boiler, developed for the Royal Navy between the First and Second World Wars. Much of the design work was conducted at Admiralty Fuel Experimental Station (Note: initially the "Admiralty Liquid Fuel Experimentation Station", later the Admiralty Marine Engineering Establishment) at Haslar and the first boilers were installed in three of the A class destroyers of 1927. These boilers established new Royal Navy standard operating conditions for boilers of 300 psi (2.0 MPa) / 600 °F (316 °C).

The design was broadly similar to later high-pressure and oil-fired versions of the Yarrow. The waterdrums were cylindrical and downcomers were sometimes, but not always, used. The only major difference was in the tube banks. Rather than straight tubes, each tube was mostly straight, but slightly cranked towards their ends. These were installed in two groups within the bank, so that they formed a gap between them within the bank. Superheaters were placed inside this gap and hung by hooks from the steam drum. The advantage of placing the superheaters here was that they increased the temperature differential between the inner and outer tubes of the bank, thus encouraging circulation. In the developed form, the boiler had four rows of tubes on the furnace-side of the superheater and thirteen for the outer-side.

==== Feedwater ====
The first boilers suffered problems with the superheaters and with poor circulation for the tube rows in the centre of the bank, leading to overheating and tube failure. The circulation problems were addressed by re-arranging the feedwater pipes and by placing baffles inside the steam drum, so as to give a more clearly defined circulation. A circulation augmenter, a steel trough, was placed over the tops of the furnace-side tubes, encouraging a single central upwelling flow to above the water level, encouraging steam bubbles to escape and acting as a steam separator before the water re-circulated down the outer-side tubes. In a manner similar to work taking place around the same time on the LMS railway and the development of top feed for steam locomotives, the feedwater was also routed upwards through 'spray pots' and thus passed through the steam space as droplets. The cold feedwater was thus heated to the same temperature as the boiler water before mixing with it, avoiding disturbance to the circulation path. (Note: Although there is no record of any shared development here, between the Royal Navy and the LMS railway, the two solutions represent an example of parallel evolution in response to the same problem. As boiler pressure increases, the saturation temperature of wet steam and thus the circulating water increases, making it more sensitive to disruption by cold feedwater.)

==== Superheaters ====
Initial superheat performance was disappointing. Superheat at full power was limited deliberately to 100 °F (37.8 °C) so as to avoid reliability problems, which then meant that it was ineffective at low powers. Development work by Babcock & Wilcox resolved this by increasing the steam flow speed through the superheater to 150 ft/s (45.72 m/s), avoiding the problems of tube distortion and metallurgical failure. New boilers for the Nelson-class battleships and the Kent-class cruisers could achieve a superheat of 200–250 °F (93–121 °C) throughout the operating power range at 250 psi (1.7 MPa).

==== Backwall ====
Unlike contemporary American practice, British naval boilers had a large proportion of furnace brickwork, leading to a high temperature within the furnace and consequently a high loading upon the tubes. The use of a water-wall furnace could reduce this.

From 1929, Hawthorn Leslie constructed a trial boiler with a partial water-wall to the rear of the furnace. Unlike other water-wall designs, this additional water drum spanned only the centre of the furnace, the vertical tubes were enclosed in a refractory casing and did not form a closely packed solid wall. The concern was that a full water-wall would unbalance the existing header arrangement of the three-drum boiler, which indeed showed to be the case. Excess steam production at the rear of the steam drum led to disrupted circulation and a problem with priming. The development of water-walls for this type of boiler was abandoned, although trials did continue with HMS Hyperion (H97) which was trialled with a single water-wall Johnson boiler replacing one of its three three-drum boilers.

=== Engine 10000 ===
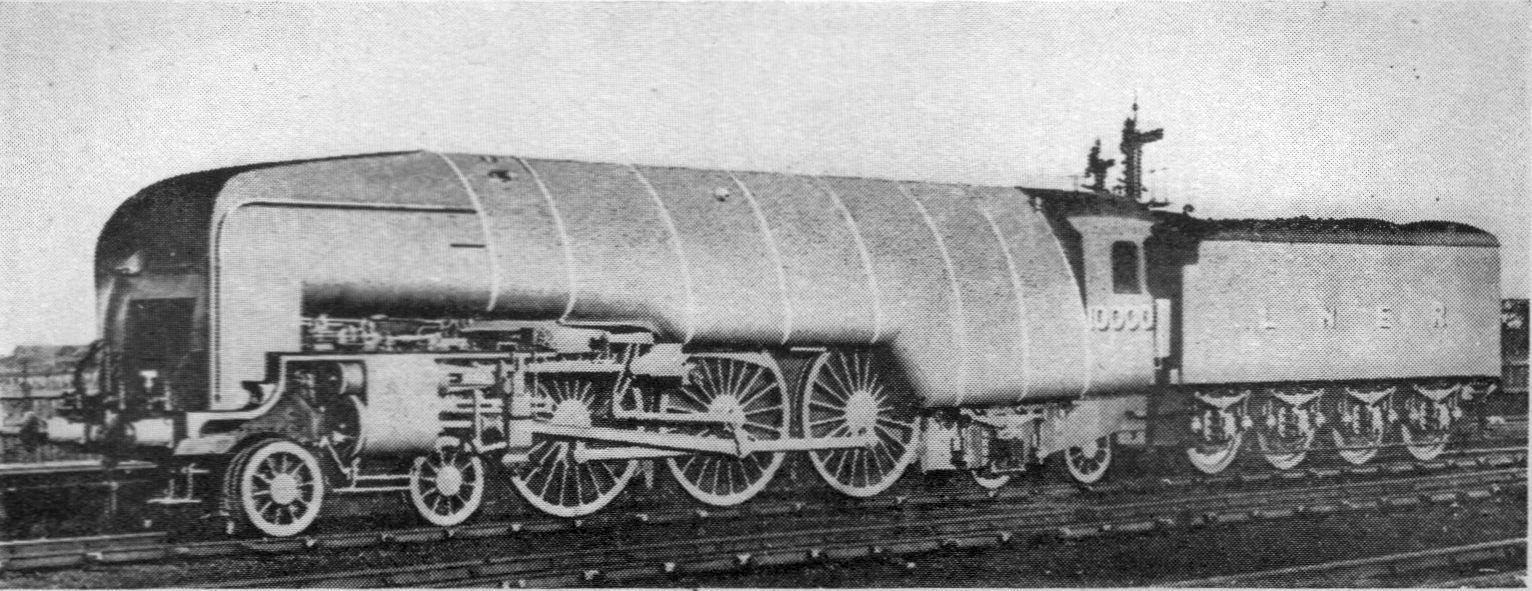
Engine 10000

The only large three-drum boiler used in a railway locomotive was Nigel Gresley's experimental Engine 10000 of 1924 for the LNER company. Having observed the benefits of higher pressures and compound engines in marine practice, Gresley was keen to experiment with this approach in a railway locomotive. As with the land-based boilers, Harold Yarrow was keen to expand the market for Yarrow's boiler.

The boiler was not the usual Yarrow design. In operation, particularly its circulation paths, the boiler had more in common with other three-drum designs such as the Woolnough. It has also been described as an evolution of the Brotan-Deffner water-tube firebox, with the firebox extended to become the entire boiler.

Working pressure was of 450 pounds per square inch (31 bar) as opposed to the 180 pounds per square inch (12 bar) of the contemporary Gresley A1 locomotives.

The boiler resembled two elongated marine Yarrow boilers, placed end to end. Both had the usual Yarrow arrangement of a central large steam drum above two separated water drums, linked by four rows of slightly curved tubes. The upper drum was shared, but the lower water drums were separate. The rearward "firebox" area was wide and spanned the frames, placing the water drums at the limits of the loading gauge. The forward "boiler" region was narrow-set, with its water drums placed between the frames. Although the outer casings were of similar width, the tube banks for the forward section were much closer. The space outboard of the tubes formed a pair of exhaust flues leading forwards. A large space outside these flue walls but inside the boiler casing was used as an air duct from the air inlet, a crude rectangular slot beneath the smokebox door, which had the effect of both pre-heating the combustion air and of cooling the outer casing to prevent overheating. Longitudinal superheater tubes were placed in the central space between the steam generating tubes. The third area forwards contained superheater headers, the regulators and the smokebox, but no deliberate heating surface. The external boiler casing remained at much the same width throughout, giving an overall triangular, but curved, appearance. The lower edge of each section stepped upwards, and was obvious externally.

Firing was with coal, at just one end through a conventional locomotive single firedoor, and a single manual fireman. Owing to the single-ended firing and the predominantly longitudinal gasflow, compared to the Yarrow's normal through-bank gasflow, there was a pronounced temperature difference between the front and back of the boiler. This led to the water circulation currents, especially in the second section, to be longitudinal through the water drums, like the Woolnough, rather than the usual Yarrow. The first section, which included some water-tubes to the rear wall, was radiant heated and effectively a water-wall furnace, without any gas flow through the tube bank. Despite this, it still used four rows of tubes. The second section had its gasflow arranged by steel and firebrick baffles so that the combustion gases entered through the centre and passed through the tube banks into the side flues, giving better convective heat transfer.
