= Daring-class destroyer (1893) =

1895 class of torpedo boat destroyers of the Royal Navy

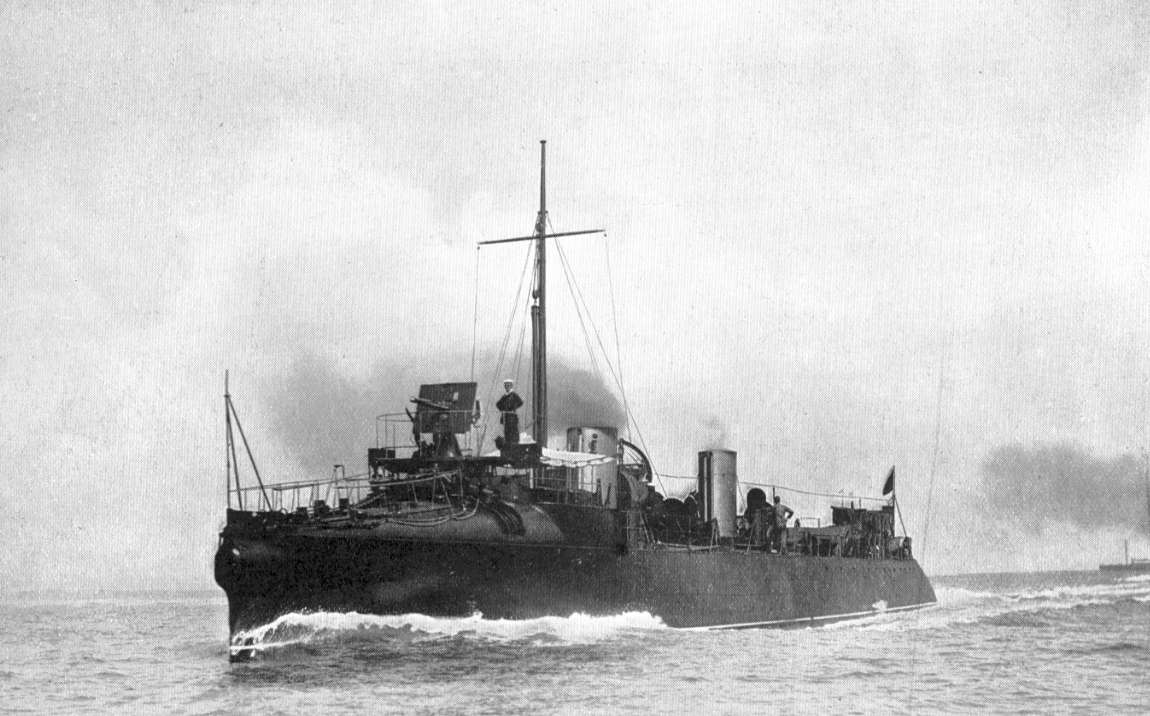
- HMS Daring

Class overview
- Name: Daring class
- Builders: John I. Thornycroft & Company, Chiswick
- Preceded by: None
- Succeeded by: Havock class
- Built: 1892–1894
- In commission: 1895–1912
- Completed: 2
- Lost: 1
- Scrapped: 1

General characteristics
- Type: Torpedo boat destroyer
- Displacement: 260 long tons (264 t) light; 287.8 long tons (292 t) full load
- Length: 185 ft (56 m) oa
- Beam: 19 ft (5.8 m)
- Draught: 7 ft (2.1 m)
- Installed power: 4,200 hp (3,132 kW)
- Propulsion: 2 × triple-expansion steam engines; 2 × water-tube boilers; 2 shafts
- Speed: 27 knots (50 km/h; 31 mph)
- Armament: 1 × 12 pounder gun; 3 (later 5) × 6 pounder guns; 3 (later 2) × torpedo tubes

Two Daring-class destroyers were the very first torpedo boat destroyers ("TBDs") to be ordered for the Royal Navy, the order being placed on 27 June 1892.

== Background ==
The invention of the self-propelled torpedo in the 1860s, combined with the introduction of small fast torpedo boats posed a threat to battleships: large numbers of torpedo boats could overwhelm a battleship's defences and sink it, or distract the battleship and make it vulnerable to opposing capital ships. Torpedo boats proved devastatingly effective in the 1891 Chilean Civil War.

The defence against torpedo boats was clear: small warships accompanying the fleet that could screen and protect it from attack by torpedo boats. Several European navies developed vessels variously known as torpedo boat "catchers", "hunters" and "destroyers", while the Royal Navy itself operated torpedo gunboats. However, the early designs lacked the range and speed to keep up with the fleet they were supposed to protect. In 1892, the Third Sea Lord, Rear Admiral Jackie Fisher ordered the development of a new type of ships equipped with the then novel water-tube boilers and quick-firing small-calibre guns.

== Orders ==
Six ships to the specifications circulated by the Admiralty were ordered initially, comprising three slightly different designs each produced by a different shipbuilder:

- HMS Daring and HMS Decoy from John I. Thornycroft & Company
- HMS Havock and HMS Hornet from Yarrows (the Havock class)
- HMS Ferret and HMS Lynx from Laird, Son & Company (the Ferret class)

== Design ==
These boats all featured a turtleback (i.e. rounded) forecastle that was characteristic of early British TBDs. All six of them were removed from service and disposed of by the end of 1912, and thus were not affected by the Admiralty decision in 1913 to group all the surviving 27-knot and 30-knot destroyers (which had followed on these six 26-knot vessels) into four heterogeneous classes, labelled "A", "B", "C" and "D" classes.

Daring and Decoy were both built by Thornycroft, displaced 260 tons (287.8 tons full load) and were 185 feet (56 m) in length. They were armed with one 12-pounder gun and three 6-pounder guns, with one fixed 18-in torpedo tube in the bow plus two more torpedo tubes on a revolving mount abaft the two funnels. Later the bow torpedo tube was removed and two more 6-pounder guns added instead. They produced 4,200 hp (3,100 kW) from a pair of Thornycroft water-tube boilers, giving them a top speed of 27 knots. In common with subsequent early Thornycroft boats, they had sloping sterns and double rudders.

== Bibliography ==
- Chesneau, Roger & Kolesnik, Eugene M., eds. (1979). Conway's All The World's Fighting Ships 1860–1905. London: Conway Maritime Press. ISBN 0-85177-133-5.
- Colledge, J. J.; Warlow, Ben (2006) [1969]. Ships of the Royal Navy: The Complete Record of All Fighting Ships of the Royal Navy from the 15th Century to the Present (3rd Rev ed.). London: Chatham Publishing. ISBN 978-1-86176-281-8. OCLC 67375475.
- Dittmar, F.J.; Colledge, J.J. (1972). British Warships 1914–1919. Shepperton, UK: Ian Allan. ISBN 0-7110-0380-7.
- Friedman, Norman (2009). British Destroyers: From Earliest Days to the Second World War. Barnsley, UK: Seaforth Publishing. ISBN 978-1-84832-049-9.
- Gardiner, Robert & Gray, Randal, eds. (1985). Conway's All The World's Fighting Ships 1906–1921. London: Conway Maritime Press. ISBN 0-85177-245-5.
- Lyon, David (2001) [1996]. The First Destroyers. London: Caxton Editions. ISBN 1-84067-3648.
- Manning, T. D. (1961). The British Destroyer. London: Putnam & Co. OCLC 6470051.
- March, Edgar J. (1966). British Destroyers: A History of Development, 1892–1953; Drawn by Admiralty Permission From Official Records & Returns, Ships' Covers & Building Plans. London: Seeley Service. OCLC 164893555.
