= HMS Arun (1903) =

Destroyer of the Royal Navy

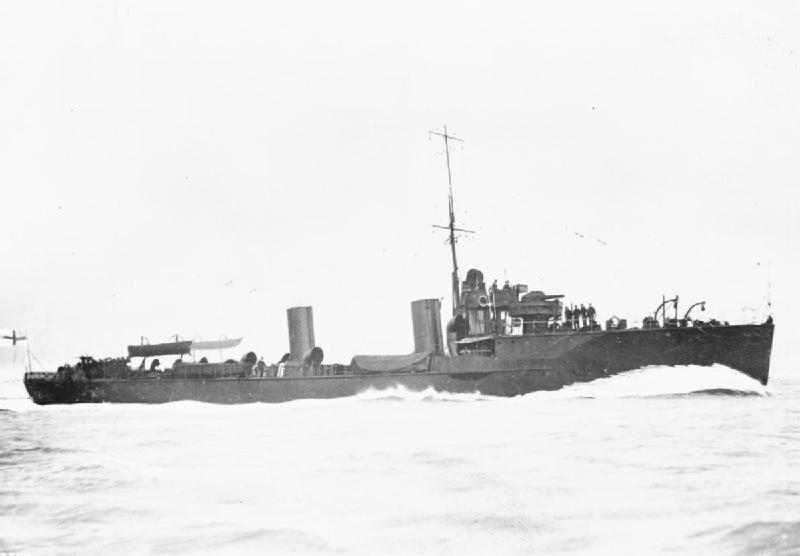
- HMS Arun

History

United Kingdom
- Name: HMS Arun
- Namesake: River Arun
- Ordered: 1902–1903 Naval Estimates
- Builder: Cammell Laird, Birkenhead
- Laid down: 27 August 1902
- Launched: 29 April 1903
- Commissioned: February 1904
- Out of service: Laid up in reserve, 1919
- Fate: Sold to Thos. W. Ward of Sheffield on 30 June 1920 for breaking at Hale, North Cornwall

General characteristics
- Class & type: Laird Type River-class destroyer
- Displacement: 550 long tons (559 t) standard; 625 long tons (635 t) full load
- Length: 226 ft 6 in (69.04 m) o/a
- Beam: 23 ft 9 in (7.24 m)
- Draught: 7 ft 9 in (2.36 m)
- Propulsion: 4 × Yarrow type water tube boiler; 2 × Vertical Triple Expansion (VTE) steam engines driving 2 shafts producing 7,000 shp (5,200 kW) (average)
- Speed: 25.5 kn (47.2 km/h)
- Range: 140 tons coal; 1,870 nmi (3,460 km) at 11 kn (20 km/h)
- Complement: 70 officers and men
- Armament: 1 × QF 12-pounder 12 cwt Mark I, mounting P Mark I; 3 × QF 12-pounder 8 cwt, mounting G Mark I (Added in 1906); 5 × QF 6-pounder 8 cwt (removed in 1906); 2 × single tubes for 18-inch (450mm) torpedoes

Service record
- Part of: East Coast Destroyer Flotilla (1905); 3rd Destroyer Flotilla (Apr 1909); 5th Destroyer Flotilla (1912); Assigned E class (Aug 1912-Oct 1913); 9th Destroyer Flotilla (1914); 5th Destroyer Flotilla (Aug 1915)
- Operations: World War I (1914-1918)

HMS Arun was a Laird Type River-class destroyer ordered by the Royal Navy under the 1902–1903 Naval Estimates. Named after the River Arun in southern England she was the first ship to carry this name in the Royal Navy.

== Construction ==
She was laid down on 27 August 1902 at the Cammell Laird shipyard at Birkenhead and launched on 29 April 1903. She was completed in February 1904. Her original armament was to be the same as the turtleback torpedo boat destroyers that preceded her. In 1906 the Admiralty decided to upgrade the armament by landing the five 6-pounder naval guns and shipping three 12-pounder 8 hundredweight (cwt) guns. Two would be mounted abeam at the foc's'le break and the third gun would be mounted on the quarterdeck.

== Pre-War ==
After commissioning she was assigned to the East Coast Destroyer Flotilla of the 1st Fleet and based at Harwich.

On 13 August 1904, while under the command of Commander Reginald Y. Tyrwhitt, RN, she collided with the destroyer Decoy off the Scilly Islands. Decoy sank.

On 27 April 1908 the Eastern Flotilla departed Harwich for live fire and night manoeuvres. During these exercises the cruiser Attentive rammed and sank the destroyer HMS Gala, then damaged the destroyer HMS Ribble.

In April 1909 she was assigned to the 3rd Destroyer Flotilla of the 1st Fleet on its formation at Harwich. She remained until displaced by a Basilisk-class destroyer by May 1912. She went into reserve assigned to the 5th Destroyer Flotilla of the 2nd Fleet with a nucleus crew.

On 30 August 1912 the Admiralty directed all destroyer classes were to be designated by alpha characters starting with the letter 'A'. The ships of the River class were assigned to the 'E'-class. After 30 September 1913, she was known as an E-class destroyer and had the letter 'E' painted on the hull below the bridge area and on either the fore or aft funnel.

== World War I ==
In early 1914 when displaced by G-class destroyers she joined the 9th Destroyer Flotilla based at Chatham tendered to HMS St George. The 9th Flotilla was a patrol flotilla tasked with anti-submarine and counter mining patrols in the Firth of Forth area. By September 1914, Arun was deployed to the Scapa Flow Local Flotilla under the Commander-in-Chief, Home Fleet tendered to HMS Marlborough. Here she provided anti-submarine and counter mining patrols in defence of the main fleet anchorage.

In August 1915 with the amalgamation of the 7th and 9th Flotillas, she was redeployed to the 5th Destroyer Flotilla in the Mediterranean Fleet based at Alexandria. Here Arun was employed in escort of merchant ships, counter mining patrols and anti-submarine patrols in the Eastern Mediterranean Sea for the remainder of the war.

== Disposition ==
In 1919 Arun returned to Home Waters and was paid off then laid up in reserve awaiting disposal. On 30 June 1920 she was sold to Thos. W. Ward of Sheffield for breaking at Hayle, Cornwall.

She was not awarded a Battle Honour for her service.

== Pennant numbers ==
Pennant Number	From	To
N04	6 December 1914	1 September 1915
D11	1 September 1915	1 January 1918
D07	1 January 1918	13 September 1918

== Bibliography ==
- Chesneau, Roger & Kolesnik, Eugene M., eds. (1979). Conway's All The World's Fighting Ships 1860–1905. London: Conway Maritime Press. ISBN 0-85177-133-5.
- Colledge, J. J.; Warlow, Ben (2006) [1969]. Ships of the Royal Navy: The Complete Record of All Fighting Ships of the Royal Navy from the 15th Century to the Present (3rd Rev ed.). London: Chatham Publishing. ISBN 978-1-86176-281-8. OCLC 67375475.
- Dittmar, F.J.; Colledge, J. J. (1972). British Warships 1914–1919. Shepperton, UK: Ian Allan. ISBN 0-7110-0380-7.
- Friedman, Norman (2009). British Destroyers: From Earliest Days to the Second World War. Barnsley, UK: Seaforth Publishing. ISBN 978-1-84832-049-9.
- Gardiner, Robert & Gray, Randal, eds. (1985). Conway's All The World's Fighting Ships 1906–1921. London: Conway Maritime Press. ISBN 0-85177-245-5.
- Manning, T. D. (1961). The British Destroyer. London: Putnam & Co. OCLC 6470051.
- March, Edgar J. (1966). British Destroyers: A History of Development, 1892–1953; Drawn by Admiralty Permission From Official Records & Returns, Ships' Covers & Building Plans. London: Seeley Service. OCLC 164893555.
