= Yarrow boiler =

Obsolete class of water-tube boilers widely used on ships

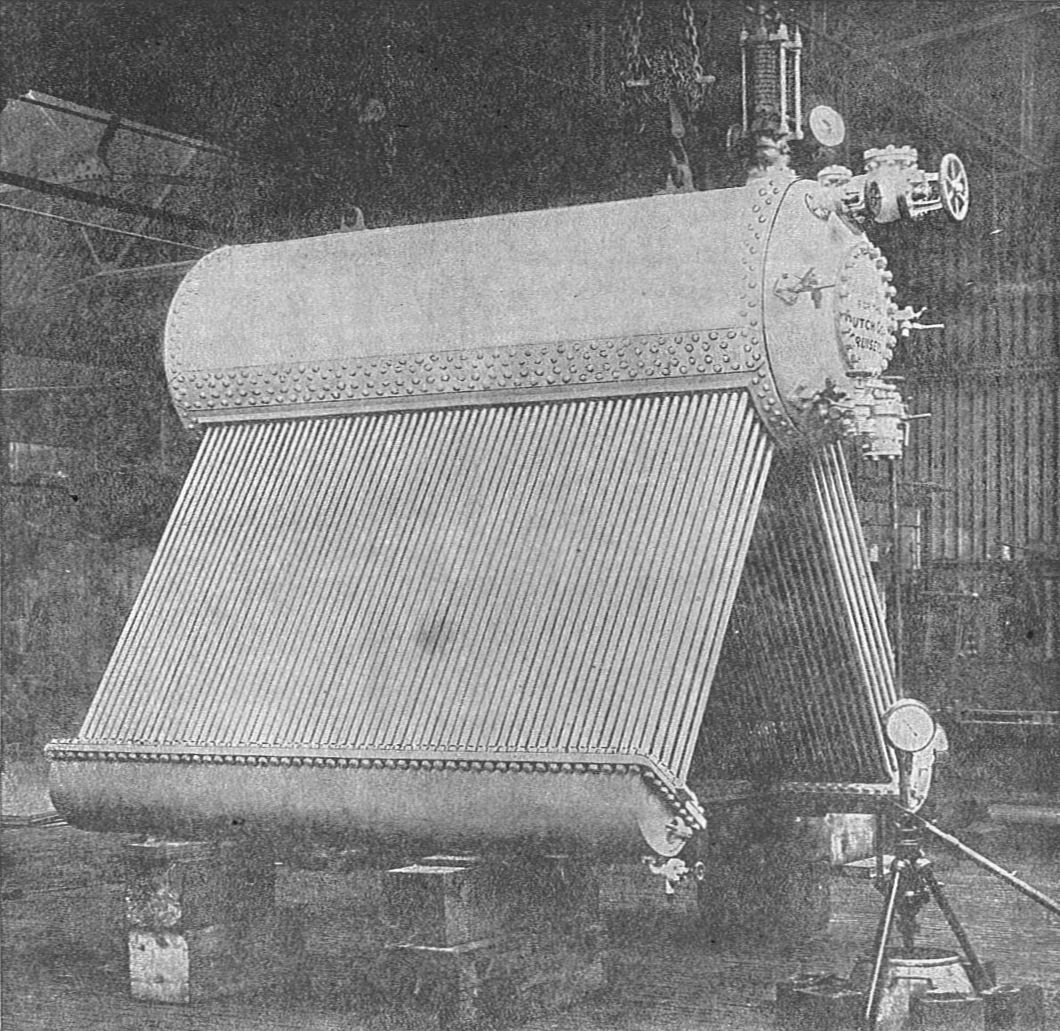
Yarrow boiler, with the flue and outer casing removed

Yarrow boilers are an important class of high-pressure water-tube boilers. They were developed by Yarrow & Co. (London), Shipbuilders and Engineers and were widely used on ships, particularly warships.

The Yarrow boiler design is characteristic of the three-drum boiler: two banks of straight water-tubes are arranged in a triangular row with a single furnace between them. A single steam drum is mounted at the top between them, with smaller water drums at the base of each bank. Circulation, both upwards and downwards, occurs within this same tube bank. The Yarrow's distinctive features were the use of straight tubes and also circulation in both directions taking place within the tube bank, rather than using external downcomers.

== Early watertube boilers ==
Early use of the water-tube boiler within the Royal Navy was controversial at times, giving rise to the 'Battle of the Boilers' around 1900. These first boilers, such as the Belleville and Niclausse, were large-tube designs, with simple straight tubes of around 4" diameter, at a shallow angle to the horizontal. These tubes were jointed into cast iron headers and gave much trouble with leakage at these joints. At the time, an assumption was that thermal expansion in these straight tubes was straining the joints. These boilers were also large, and although fitted to many pre-dreadnought battleships, could not be fitted to the small torpedo boats and the early destroyers then under very active development.

To provide a lighter boiler for smaller vessels, the 'Express' types were developed. These used smaller water-tubes of around 2" diameter, giving a greater ratio of heating area to volume (and weight). Most of these were of the three-drum pattern, particularly of the Du Temple and Normand designs. This gave a more vertical arrangement of the water-tubes, thus encouraging thermosyphon circulation in these narrow tubes. The previous problems of tube expansion were still a theoretical concern and so the tubes were either curved, or even convoluted into hairpins and S shapes, so as to increase heating area. In practice these shapes gave rise to two more practical problems: difficulty in cleaning the tubes and also difficulty in forming a reliable joint into the water drums, particularly where tubes entered the drum at a variety of angles.

== Yarrow's water-tube boiler ==
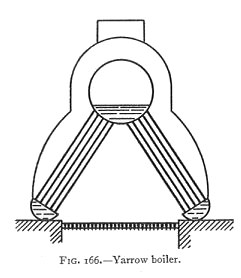

Alfred Yarrow developed his boiler as a response to others that had already developed water-tube boilers. This was a long process based on theoretical experiment rather than evolution of practical boilers. Work began in 1877 and the first commercial boiler was not supplied until 10 years later, a torpedo boat of 1887.

Despite this long gestation, the boiler's origins appear to have been most direct. Yarrow's initial conversation with William Crush, head of the boiler department, is recorded to have included a rather direct approach and Yarrow's statements, "We must wake-up about water-tube boilers", "Why not a boiler like this?" (placing his fingers together as if praying), and "Straight tubes?" already expressed two of the boiler's three basic design principles.

== Straight tubes ==
Early water-tube designers had been concerned with the expansion of the boiler's tubes when heated. Efforts were made to permit them to expand freely, particularly so that those closest to the furnace might expand relatively more than those further away. Typically this was done by arranging the tubes in large looping curves, as for the Thornycroft boiler. These had difficulties in manufacturing and required support in use.

Yarrow recognised that the temperature of a water-filled tube was held relatively low and was consistent amongst them, provided that they remained full of water and boiling was not allowed to occur within the tubes themselves. High temperatures and variations only arose when tubes became steam filled, which also disrupted circulation.

His conclusion was thus that straight water-tubes were acceptable, and had obvious advantages for manufacture and cleaning in service.

Obtaining tubes capable of withstanding the increasing boiler pressures was difficult and most makers had already experienced problems with the welds in the tubes. A less obvious benefit of straight tubes was that they could make use of the newly developed seamless-drawn tubes now being produced for bicycle manufacture.

== Yarrow's circulation experiments ==
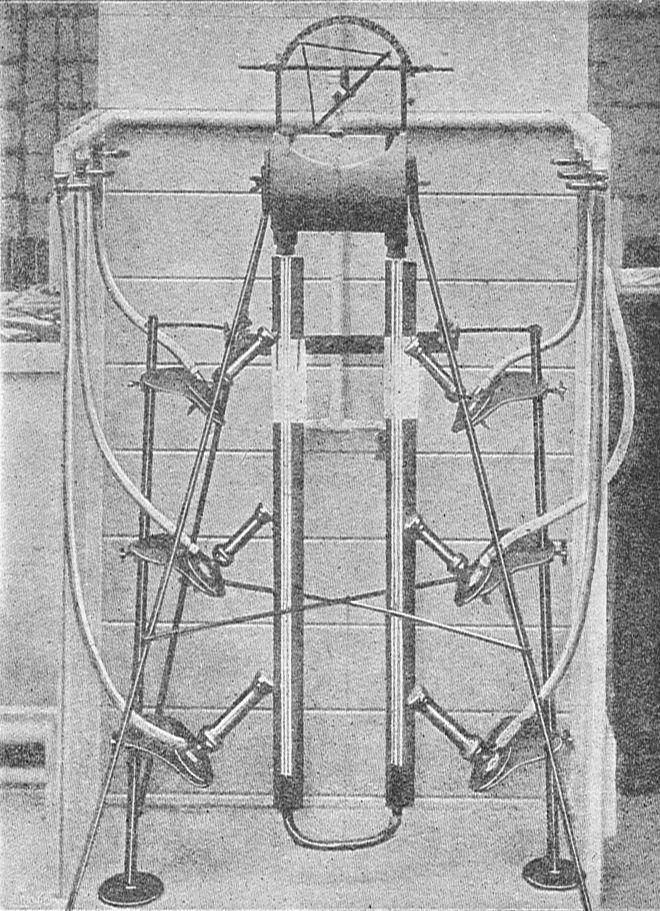
Yarrow's U-tube circulation experiment

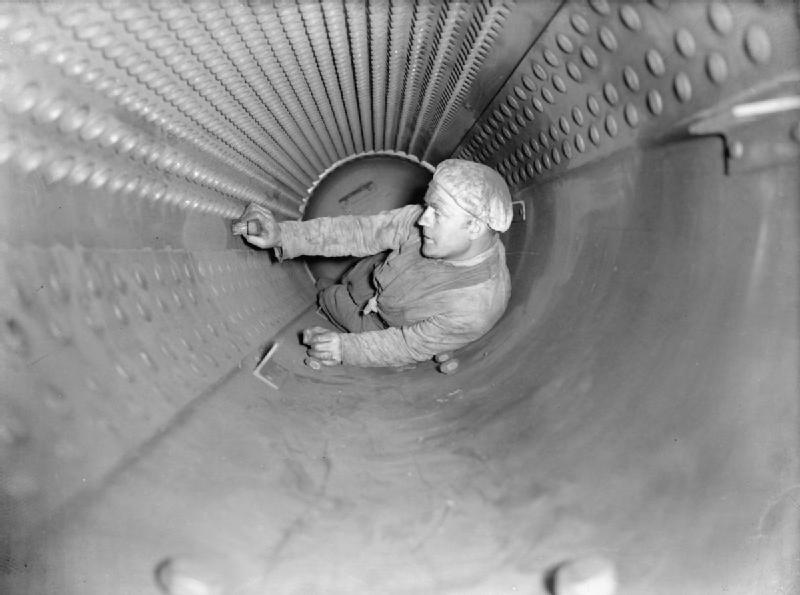
Cleaning a Yarrow boiler

It was already recognised that a water-tube boiler relied on a continuous flow through the water-tubes, and that this must be by a thermosyphon effect rather than impractically requiring a pump.

The heated water-tubes were a large number of small diameter tubes mounted between large drums: the water drums below and steam drums above. Fairbairn's studies had already showed the importance of tube diameter and how small diameter tubes could easily withstand far higher pressures than large diameters. The drums could withstand the pressure by virtue of their robust construction. Manholes fitted to them allowed regular internal inspection.

The assumption was that flow through the water-tubes would be upwards, owing to their heating by the furnace, and that the counterbalancing downward flow would require external unheated downcomers. In most water-tube designs these were a few large-diameter external pipes from the steam drum to the water drum. These large-diameter pipes were thus a problem for reliability owing to their rigidity and the forces upon them.

Alfred Yarrow conducted a famous experiment where he disproved this assumption. Sources are unclear as to whether he discovered this during the experiment, or conducted the experiment merely to demonstrate a theory that he already held.

A vertical U-shaped tube was arranged so that it could be heated by a series of Bunsen burners on each side. A simple flow meter indicated the direction and approximate strength of any flow through the tank at the top linking the two arms of the U.

When only one side of the U was heated, there was the expected upward flow of heated water in that arm of the tube.

When heat was also applied to the unheated arm, conventional theory predicted that the circulatory flow would slow or stop completely. In practice, the flow actually increased. Provided that there was some asymmetry to the heating, Yarrow's experiment showed that circulation could continue and heating of the cooler downcomer could even increase this flow.

Yarrow then repeated the experiment, first with the U-tube at a shallow angle to the horizontal, finally with the entire system under pressure. The results were the same and circulation was maintained.

The Yarrow boiler could thus dispense with separate external downcomers. Flow was entirely within the heated watertubes, upwards within those closest to the furnace and downwards through those in the outer rows of the bank.

== Description ==
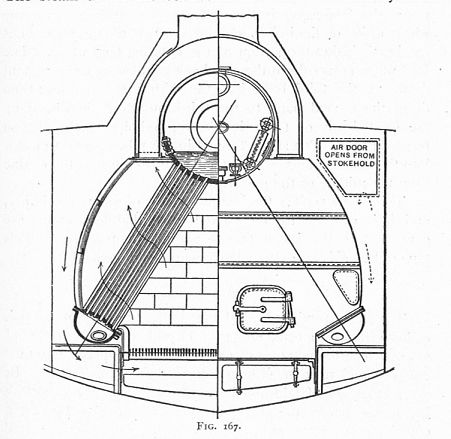
End half-section of a boiler, showing the enclosing furnace and flue

Yarrow's production boiler had a simple and distinctive design that remained broadly unchanged afterwards. Three drums were arranged in a triangular formation: a single large steam drum at the top and two smaller water drums below. They were linked by straight watertubes in a multi-row bank to each water drum.

The furnace was placed in the space between the tube banks. Early boilers were manually coal fired, later oil fired. The boiler was enclosed in a sealed casing of steel, lined with firebricks. Brick-lined end walls to this casing housed the firedoors or oil burner quarls, but had no heating surface. The uptake flue from the boiler was in the centre top of the casing, the exhaust gases passing around the steam drum. To reduce corrosion from flue gases over the drum, it was sometimes wrapped in a simple deflector shroud. Usually the lower part of the water drums were exposed outside the casing, but only the ends of the steam drum emerged. The water level was at around one-third of the steam drum diameter, enough to cover the ends of the submerged water-tubes.

The weight of the boiler rested on the water drums, and thus on supports from the firing flat's deck. The steam drum was only supported by the watertubes and was allowed to move freely, with thermal expansion. If superheated, the superheater elements were hung from this drum. Compared to the earlier Scotch and locomotive boilers, water-tube boilers with their reduced water volumes were considered lightweight and didn't require extensive supports.

=== Later evolution in design ===
==== Water drums ====
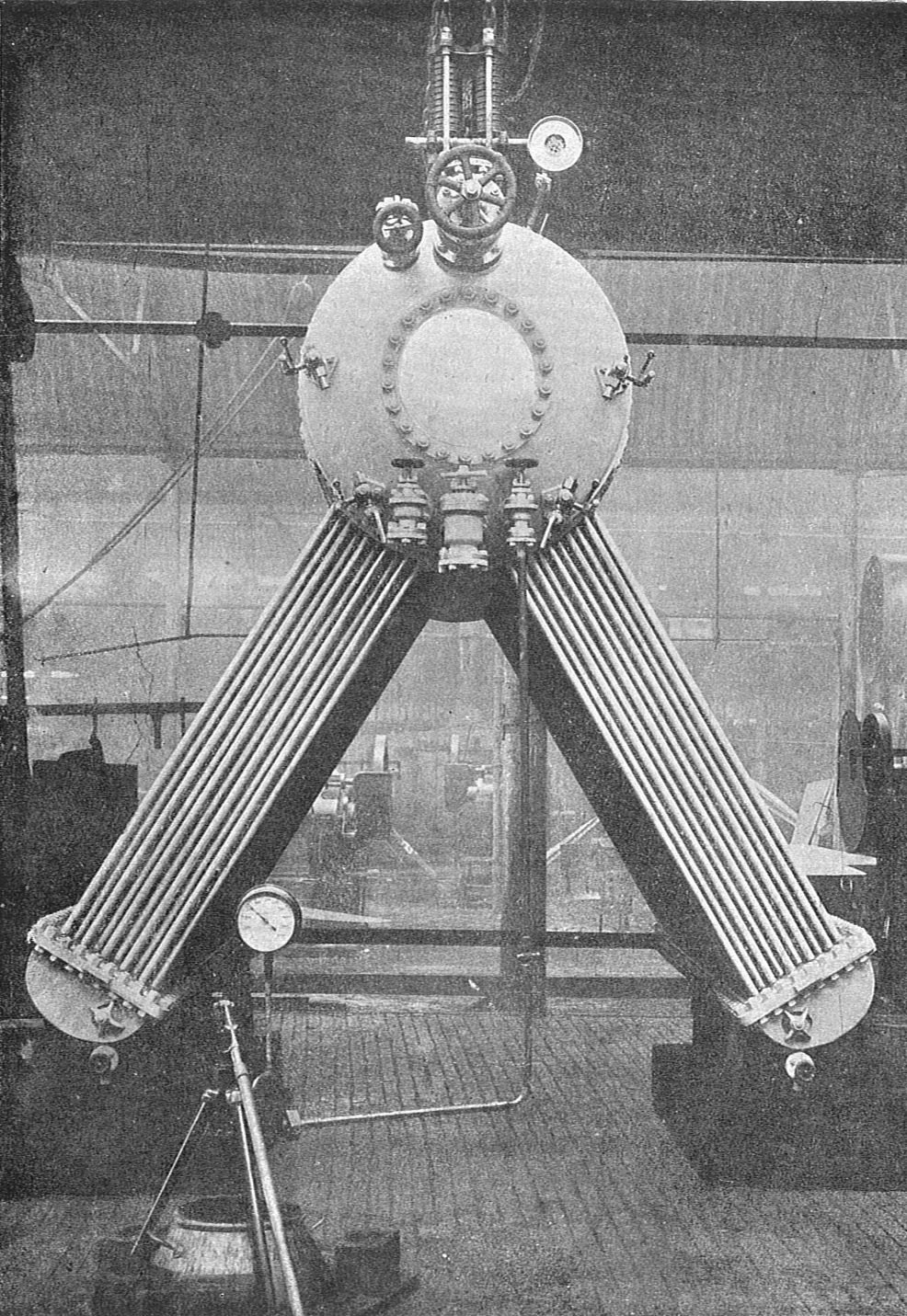
Early Yarrow boiler, showing the D-shaped water troughs

The first Yarrow water drums or "troughs" were D-shaped with a flat tubeplate, so as to provide an easy mounting for the tubes. The tubeplate was bolted to the trough and could be dismantled for maintenance and tube cleaning.

This D shape is not ideal for a pressure drum though, as pressure will tend to distort it into a more circular section. Experience of boiler explosions had shown that sharp internal corners inside boilers were also prone to erosion by grooving.

Later boilers used a more rounded section, despite the difficulty of inserting and sealing the tube ends when they were no longer perpendicular. These later drums had a manhole in the ends for access.

==== Downcomers ====
The circulation in a Yarrow boiler depended on a temperature difference between the inner and outer tube rows of a bank, and particularly upon the rates of boiling. Whilst this is easy to maintain at low powers, a higher pressure Yarrow boiler will tend to have less temperature difference and thus will have less effective circulation. This effect can be counteracted by providing external downcomers, outside the heated flue area.

Although most Yarrow boilers did not require downcomers, some were fitted with them.

==== Double-ended boilers ====
The first double-ended boiler was built in 1905 for the Spanish government. The design was already well-suited to being fired from both ends and it was discovered that double-ended boilers were slightly more efficient in use.

Yarrow's shipyard was always restricted in the size of ships that it could build. Many of their boilers were intended for larger warships and Yarrow supplied these as components to the building yards with larger slipways.

=== Superheaters ===
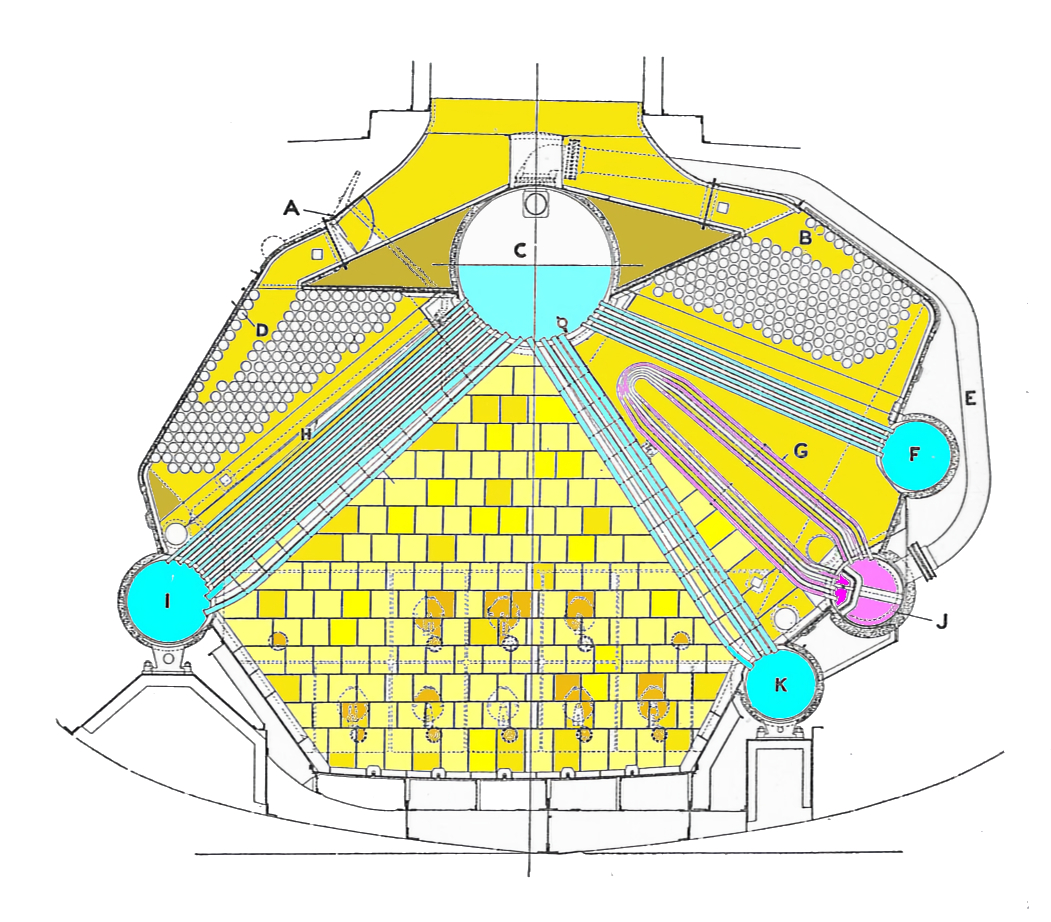
Asymmetric 'double-flow' Yarrow boiler, with superheater

Early Yarrow boilers were not superheated, but with the introduction of steam turbines, there was a demand for increasingly higher steam temperatures. Turbines are not tolerant of liquid water droplets, and superheating avoided the problem of steam condensing in the turbine (or piping leading to the turbine).

==== Asymmetric boilers ====
The Yarrow superheater consisted of hairpin tubes, parallel to the existing steam generator tubes. One bank of the generator tubes was separated in two, with individual lower water drums for them. The superheater was placed in the gap formed between these, with both ends of its tubes connected to a single superheater header drum, and an internal baffle to separate wet and dry steam.

A secondary effect of the superheater was to increase the temperature differential between inner and outer tubes of the bank, thus encouraging circulation. The two water drums were often linked by unheated downcomers, to allow this flow between the drums. This effect was later encouraged in the Admiralty boiler, where the tubes of a bank were curved apart to leave space for a superheater, whilst retaining the single water drum.

==== Controlled flow ====
Only a single superheater was ever installed, on just one side of the boiler. The simplest, and smallest, boilers moved their exhaust flue to this side, passing all of the exhaust through the bank with the superheater. The now-asymmetric boiler could pass all of its exhaust gas through the superheated side as the single flow type. The other bank remained in use for purely radiative heating, often with fewer rows of tubes.

Alternatively the 'double flow' boiler retained full gas flow through both sides, although only one of these contained a superheater. A controllable baffle on the non-superheated side could be closed to increase flow through the superheater. These boilers usually incorporated additional feedwater heaters in the updraught above these baffles.

=== Admiralty three-drum boiler ===
A later development from the Yarrow was the Admiralty three-drum boiler, developed for the Royal Navy between the wars.

This was broadly similar to later, high-pressure and oil-fired, versions of the Yarrow. The waterdrums were cylindrical and downcomers were sometimes, but not always, used. The only major difference was in the tube banks. Rather than straight tubes, each tube was mostly straight, but cranked towards their ends. These were installed in two groups within the bank, so that they formed a gap between them within the bank. Superheaters were placed inside this gap. The advantage of placing the superheaters here was that they increased the temperature differential between the inner and outer tubes of the bank, thus encouraging circulation.

== Marine use ==
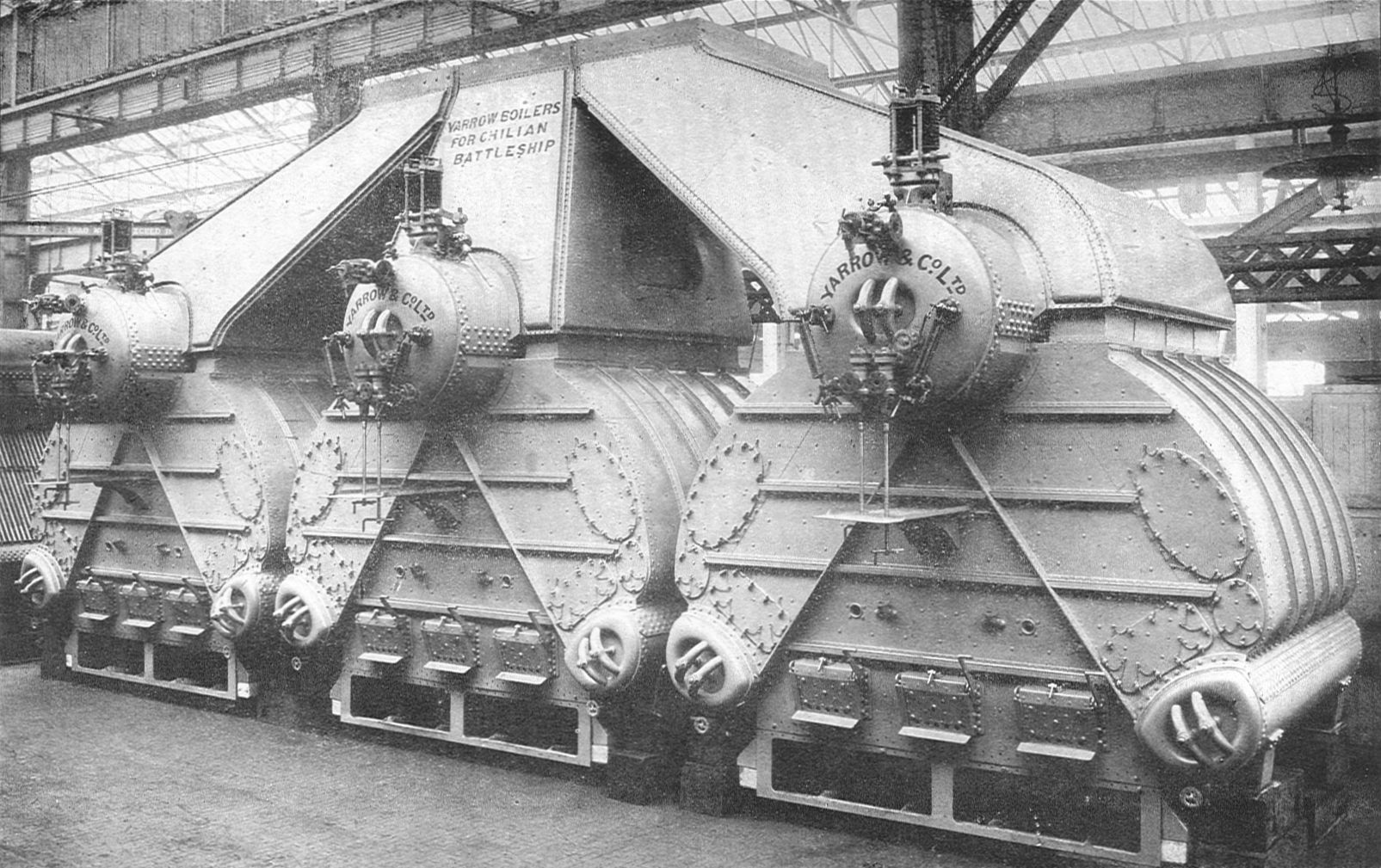
Triple group of boilers for a Chilean battleship

HMS Hornet (1893), a Havock class destroyer. HMS Havock (1893), the lead ship of the class, was built with the then current form of locomotive boiler, Hornet with a Yarrow boiler for comparison.

The first Yarrow boilers were intended for small destroyers and filled the entire width of the hull. In the early classes, three boilers were used arranged in tandem, each with a separate funnel. The later sets supplied for capital ships used multiple boilers and these were often grouped into sets of three, sharing an uptake.

== Land-based boilers ==
In 1922, Harold Yarrow decided to exploit the increasing boom for electricity generation as a market for Yarrows to build land-based boilers. The first boilers, at Dunston Power Station and Brighton, were of the same marine pattern. As for their naval success, they were recognised for having a large radiant heating area and being quick to raise steam.

Large land-based turbines required high efficiency and increased superheat, so the marine pattern was revised to the distinctive land-based Yarrow boiler. This became asymmetrical. One wing was enlarged and received most of the gas flow. The inner tube banks remained and received radiant heat from the furnace, but the gases then flowed through one of them, over a superheater bank, then through an additional third bank to increase the heat extracted.

Working pressures also increased. From a working pressure of 575 psi in 1927, by 1929 an experimental boiler was operated at 1,200 psi.

== Engine 10000 ==
Only one "Yarrow" boiler was used in a railway locomotive, Nigel Gresley's experimental Engine 10000 of 1924 for the LNER company. Having observed the benefits of higher pressures and compound engines in marine practice, Gresley was keen to experiment with this approach in a railway locomotive. As with the land-based boilers, Harold Yarrow was keen to expand the market for Yarrow's boiler.

The boiler was not the usual Yarrow design. In operation, particularly its circulation paths, the boiler had more in common with other three-drum designs such as the Woolnough. It has also been described as an evolution of the Brotan-Deffner water-tube firebox, with the firebox extended to become the entire boiler.
