= Havock-class destroyer =

Subclass of the A-class destroyers

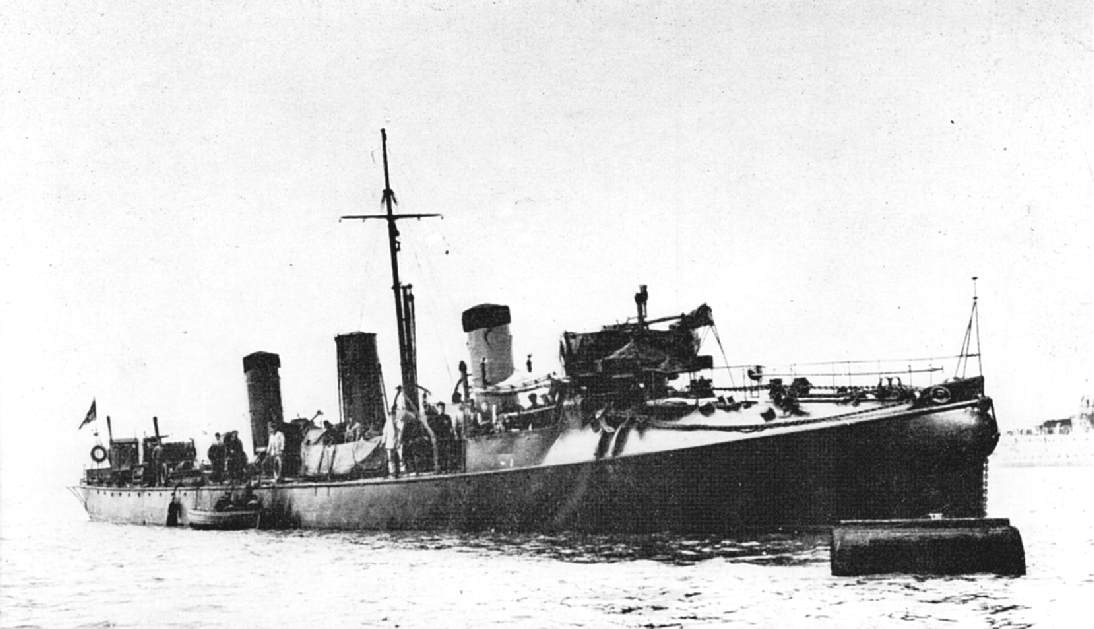
- HMS Havock

Class overview
- Name: Havock class
- Builders: Yarrow & Company, London
- Operators: Royal Navy
- Preceded by: Daring class
- Succeeded by: Ferret class
- Cost: £66,948 for 2 ships
- Built: 1893
- In commission: 1893–1912
- Planned: 2
- Completed: 2
- Retired: 2

General characteristics
- Type: Torpedo boat destroyer
- Displacement: 240 long tons (244 t) light; 275 long tons (279 t) full load
- Length: 185 ft (56.4 m) oa; 180 ft (54.9 m) pp
- Beam: 18 ft 6 in (5.64 m)
- Draught: 7 ft 6 in (2.29 m)
- Installed power: c. 3,700 ihp (2,800 kW)
- Propulsion: 8 × Yarrow water-tube boilers (Hornet); 2 × locomotive boilers (Havock); 2 × triple-expansion steam engines; 2 shafts
- Speed: 26.78 knots (49.60 km/h; 30.82 mph)
- Range: 3,000 nmi (5,600 km)
- Complement: 46
- Armament: 1 × 12-pounder gun; 3 × 6-pounder guns; 3 (later 2) × torpedo tubes (1 bow, 2 beam)

The Havock class was a class of torpedo boat destroyer (TBD) of the British Royal Navy. The two ships, Havock and Hornet, built in London in 1893 by Yarrow & Company, were the first TBDs to be completed for the Royal Navy, although the equivalent pair from J.I. Thornycroft, Daring and Decoy, were ordered five days earlier.

== Background ==
The invention of the self-propelled torpedo by Robert Whitehead and Austrian Navy Captain Giovanni Luppis in 1866, combined with the introduction of small fast torpedo boats, posed a threat to battleships: large numbers of torpedo boats could overwhelm a battleship's defences and sink it, or distract the battleship and make it vulnerable to opposing capital ships. Torpedo boats proved devastatingly effective in the 1891 Chilean Civil War.

The defence against torpedo boats was clear: small warships accompanying the fleet which could screen and protect it from attack by torpedo boats. Several European navies developed vessels variously known as torpedo boat "catchers", "hunters", and "destroyers"; while the Royal Navy itself operated torpedo gunboats. However, the early designs lacked the range and speed to keep up with the fleet they were supposed to protect. In 1892, the Third Sea Lord, Rear Admiral Jackie Fisher, ordered the development of a new type of ships equipped with the then novel water-tube boilers and quick-firing small calibre guns.

== Orders ==
Six ships to the specifications circulated by the Admiralty were ordered initially, comprising three different designs each produced by a different shipbuilder:

- HMS Havock and HMS Hornet from Yarrows.
- HMS Daring and HMS Decoy from John I. Thornycroft & Company (the Daring class).
- HMS Ferret and HMS Lynx from Laird, Son & Company (the Ferret class).

== Design ==
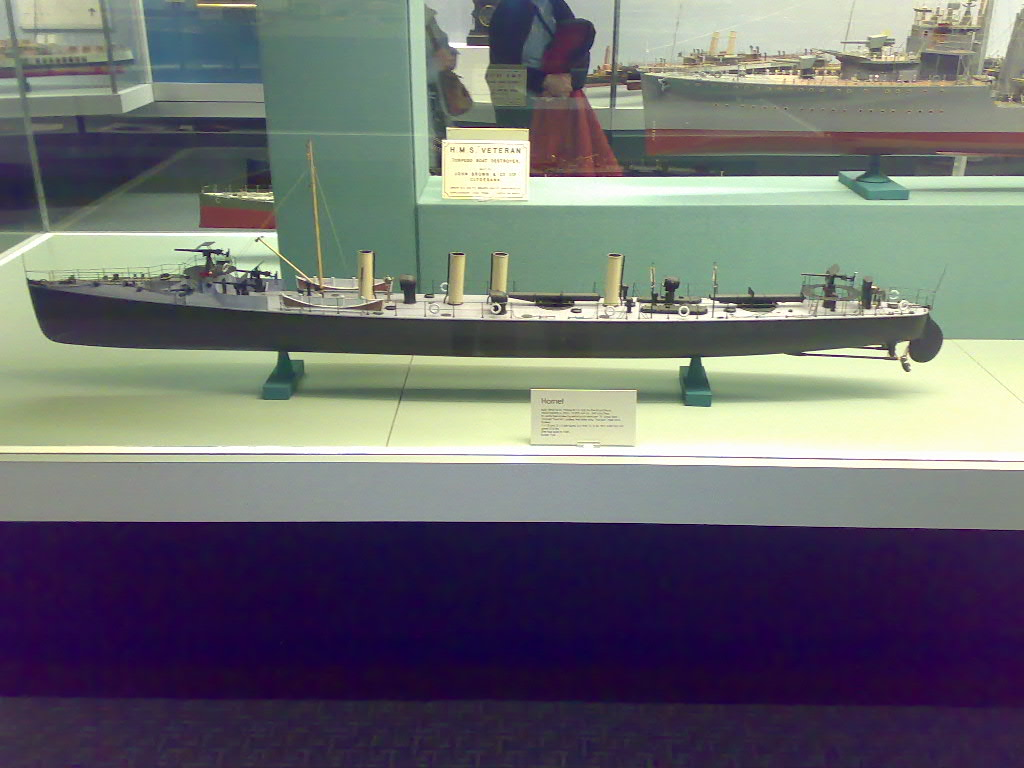
A model of Hornet (Glasgow Museum of Transport)

Havock was built with conventional locomotive boilers (giving her two closely spaced funnels) while Hornet was provided with 8 water tube boilers (giving her 4 widely spaced funnels). In other respects they were largely identical.

All the boats featured a turtleback (i.e. rounded) forecastle, characteristic of early British TBDs. All six were removed from service and disposed of by the end of 1912, and thus were not affected by the Admiralty decision in 1913 to group all the surviving 27-knot and 30-knot destroyers, which had followed the six 26-knot vessels, into four heterogeneous classes, labelled "A", "B", "C" and "D".

The design of the Russian Sokol-class destroyers was strongly influenced by the Havock-class.

== Construction and trials ==
Havock was launched first, on 12 August 1893. Her sea trials on 28 October 1893 were successful, her top speed indicating that she was capable of keeping up with battleships. However, her bow torpedo tube proved to be useless as the ship would usually outrun her own torpedo. It also tended to cause the bows to dig into the sea, resulting in a very wet turtleback. As such it (and later, the turtleback) was absent in later destroyers.

Havock "behaved well" on trials. It was noted that Hornet "steers readily and well" but her coal consumption trial revealed that she used considerably more fuel than her sister.

== Ships ==
| Name | Ship Builder | Laid down | Launched | Completed | Fate |
|---|---|---|---|---|---|
| Havock | Yarrow & Company | 1 July 1892 | 12 August 1893 | January 1894 | Sold 14 May 1912 |
| Hornet | Yarrow & Company | 1 July 1892 | 13 December 1893 | July 1894 | Sold 12 October 1909 |

Four other boats based on the Havock class, the Corrientes-class torpedo boat destroyers, were built for the Argentine Navy:

| Name | Ship Builder | Launched | Fate |
|---|---|---|---|
| Corrientes | Yarrow & Company | 1897 | Scrapped 1930 |
| Misiones | Yarrow & Company | 1897 | Scrapped 1930 |
| Entre Ríos | Yarrow & Company | 1896 | Scrapped 1930 |
| Santa Fe | Yarrow & Company | 1896 | Sunk in Uruguay 1897 |

== Royal Naval Service ==
Both ships served in home waters, although Hornet was briefly in the Mediterranean in 1909. Havock had her locomotive boilers replaced with water-tube boilers in 1899–1900, altering her appearance to a more standard 3-funnel arrangement.

== Fate ==
Havock and Hornet did not survive to see World War I, being broken up in 1912 and 1909 respectively. With the exception of ARA Santa Fe (sunk 1897), three Argentine Corrientes Class boats served until 1930.

== Bibliography ==
- Chesneau, Roger & Kolesnik, Eugene M., eds. (1979). Conway's All The World's Fighting Ships 1860–1905. London: Conway Maritime Press. ISBN 0-85177-133-5.
- Colledge, J. J.; Warlow, Ben (2006) [1969]. Ships of the Royal Navy: The Complete Record of All Fighting Ships of the Royal Navy from the 15th Century to the Present (3rd Rev ed.). London: Chatham Publishing. ISBN 978-1-86176-281-8. OCLC 67375475.
- Friedman, Norman (2009). British Destroyers: From Earliest Days to the Second World War. Barnsley, UK: Seaforth Publishing. ISBN 978-1-84832-049-9.
- Gardiner, Robert & Gray, Randal, eds. (1985). Conway's All The World's Fighting Ships 1906–1921. London: Conway Maritime Press. ISBN 0-85177-245-5.
- Lyon, David (2001) [1996]. The First Destroyers. London: Caxton Editions. ISBN 1-84067-364-8.
- Manning, T. D. (1961). The British Destroyer. Putnam & Co. OCLC 6470051.
- March, Edgar J. (1966). British Destroyers: A History of Development, 1892–1953; Drawn by Admiralty Permission From Official Records & Returns, Ships' Covers & Building Plans. London: Seeley Service. OCLC 164893555.
