= HMS Hornet (1794 gunvessel) =

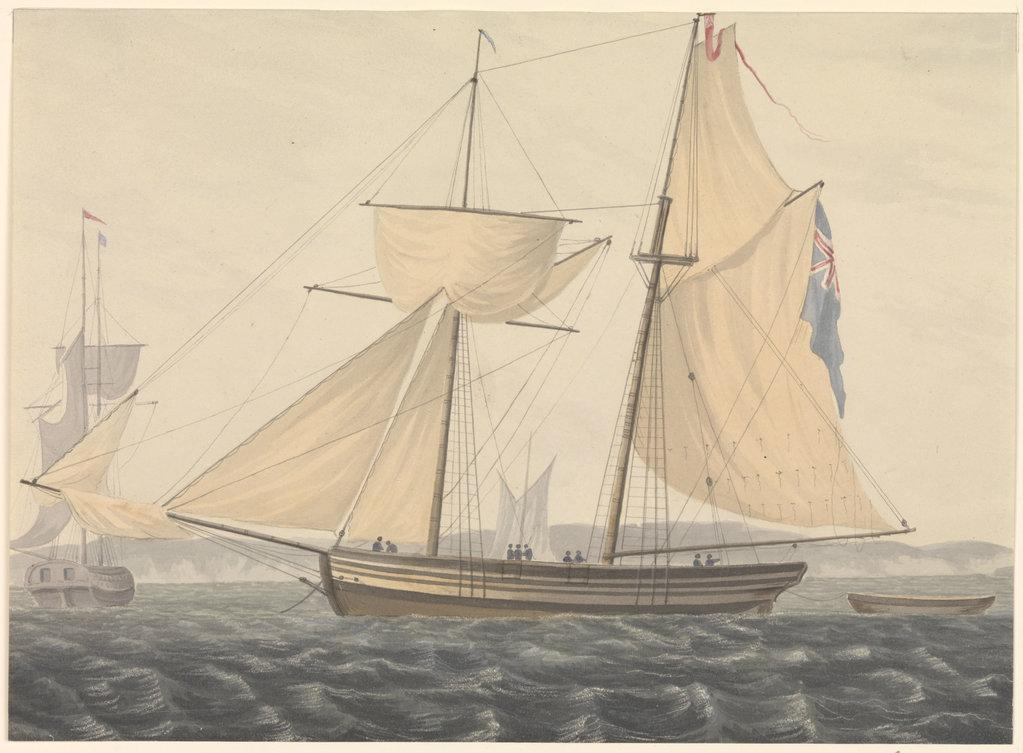
- HMS Hornet, 4 guns, a watercolour by John Thomas Serres

History

Great Britain
- Name: HMS Hornet
- Acquired: 3 February 1794 by purchase
- Fate: Broken up July 1795

General characteristics
- Type: Hoy
- Tons burthen: 60 bm
- Length: 63 ft 6 in (19.4 m) (overall); 55 ft 11 1/2 in (17.1 m) (keel)
- Beam: 14 ft 3 in (4.3 m)
- Depth of hold: 5 ft 11 in (1.8 m)
- Propulsion: Sails
- Complement: 30
- Armament: 1 × 24-pounder gun + 3 × 32-pounder carronades

HMS Hornet was a former Dutch hoy of 60 tons that the British Admiralty purchased in 1794 for service with the Royal Navy. After the Admiralty purchased Hornet she underwent fitting between March and 18 April at Deptford. Lieutenant Robert Bayley commissioned her in April. She was paid off a year later in April 1795, sold in July, and broken up at Sheerness the same year.
