= HMS Daring (1893) =

Daring-class destroyer

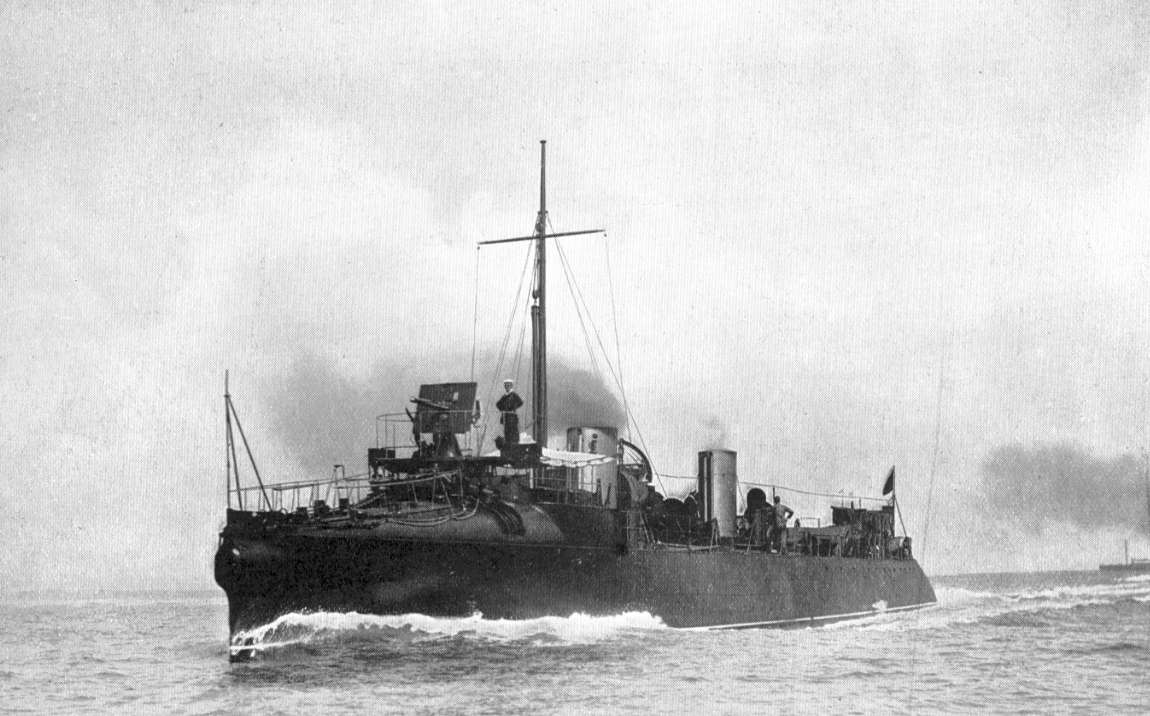
- HMS Daring

History

United Kingdom
- Name: Daring
- Builder: John I. Thornycroft & Company
- Cost: c.£36,000
- Yard number: 287
- Laid down: July 1892
- Launched: 25 November 1893
- Commissioned: February 1895
- Decommissioned: 1912
- Motto: Splendide audax; ("Finely Daring")
- Fate: Sold and broken up

General characteristics
- Class & type: Daring-class torpedo boat destroyer
- Displacement: 260 long tons (264 t) light; 287.8 long tons (292 t) full load
- Length: 185 ft (56 m) oa
- Beam: 19 ft (5.8 m)
- Draught: 7 ft (2.1 m)
- Installed power: 4,200 hp (3,132 kW)
- Propulsion: 2 Thornycroft water-tube boilers; 2 × triple-expansion steam engines; 2 shafts
- Speed: 28 knots (52 km/h)
- Complement: 46 - 53
- Armament: 1 × QF 12 pounder 12 cwt naval gun; 3 (later 5) × 6 pounder QF guns; 2 × 18 inch (450 mm) torpedo tubes; 1 × 18-inch bow torpedo tube (later removed)

HMS Daring and HMS Decoy together made up the Daring class of torpedo boat destroyers which served with the Royal Navy during the turn of the 19th and 20th centuries. On trial she made headlines as the 'Fastest Boat Ever'. The introduction of steam turbines after 1897 quickly made her and her sisters obsolete and she was sold off in 1912.

== Construction ==
The ship was laid down as yard number 287 at the Thornycroft yard at Chiswick in July 1892. She was launched on 25 November 1893 following the naming ceremony by Mrs Thornycroft, the wife of the company founder John Isaac Thornycroft. When Daring failed the sea trial cavitation was analyzed more deeply for the first time. Thornycroft records suggest that Decoy and Daring together cost £66,948, but a letter to the Austrian Naval Attaché stated that the vessels had cost the Admiralty of £36,840 per vessel. Daring commenced her trials off Gravesend on 17 January 1894 and soon moved to the measured mile at Maplin Sands near Southend. On 19 July she managed a speed of 28.21 knots over the measured mile, exceeding her design speed and earning her the sobriquet of the 'Fastest Boat Ever'. Her coal consumption trial on 18 September showed that on one ton of coal she could travel nearly 38 nautical miles at 10 knots on one boiler. She was completed in February 1895.

== Service history ==
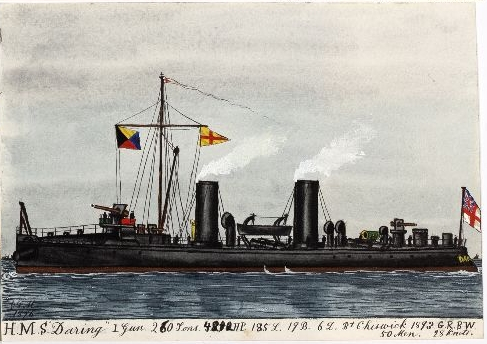
HMS Daring, by James Scott Maxwell

Daring appears to have served in home waters between 1895 and 1912. She was commissioned at Portsmouth on 23 February 1900 as tender to HMS Excellent, gunnery school situated on Whale Island near Portsmouth. In early June 1901 a boiler explosion occurred on board Daring at anchor off Portsmouth, causing the death of a crew-member and injuring several others. An inquiry showed that some tubes were blown out of the lower drum, thus freeing a flood of scalding water and steam. She was passed into the Fleet reserve at Portsmouth in early June 1902, and later the same month joined the instructional flotilla at Plymouth. Lieutenant A. S. Susmann was appointed in command on 8 August 1902, and the following month she became tender to HMS Cambridge, gunnery school ship off Plymouth. Later in September 1902, however, she was reported to be part of a squadron visiting Nauplia and Souda Bay at Crete in the Mediterranean Sea. On 26 October 1907 a minor collision took place between Daring and the destroyer Starfish at Devonport, both ships' hulls being dented. Daring was sold on 10 April 1912.

== Bibliography ==
- Chesneau, Roger & Kolesnik, Eugene M., eds. (1979). Conway's All The World's Fighting Ships 1860–1905. London: Conway Maritime Press. ISBN 0-85177-133-5.
- Colledge, J. J.; Warlow, Ben (2006) [1969]. Ships of the Royal Navy: The Complete Record of All Fighting Ships of the Royal Navy from the 15th Century to the Present (3rd Rev ed.). London: Chatham Publishing. ISBN 978-1-86176-281-8. OCLC 67375475.
- Friedman, Norman (2009). British Destroyers: From Earliest Days to the Second World War. Barnsley, UK: Seaforth Publishing. ISBN 978-1-84832-049-9.
- Gardiner, Robert & Gray, Randal, eds. (1985). Conway's All The World's Fighting Ships 1906–1921. London: Conway Maritime Press. ISBN 0-85177-245-5.
- Li, Shengcai; Brennan, Christopher E.; Matsumoto, Yoichiro (6 October 2015). "Introduction for amazing (cavitation) bubbles". Interface Focus. 5 (5). doi:10.1098/rsfs.2015.0059. ISSN 2042-8901. PMC 4549851.
- Lyon, David (2001) [1996]. The First Destroyers. London: Caxton Editions. ISBN 1-84067-364-8.
- Manning, Thomas Davys (1961). The British Destroyer. Putnam & Co. OCLC 6470051.
- March, Edgar J. (1966). British Destroyers: A History of Development, 1892–1953; Drawn by Admiralty Permission From Official Records & Returns, Ships' Covers & Building Plans. London: Seeley Service. OCLC 164893555.
