= HMS Hornet (1893) =

Havock-class destroyer

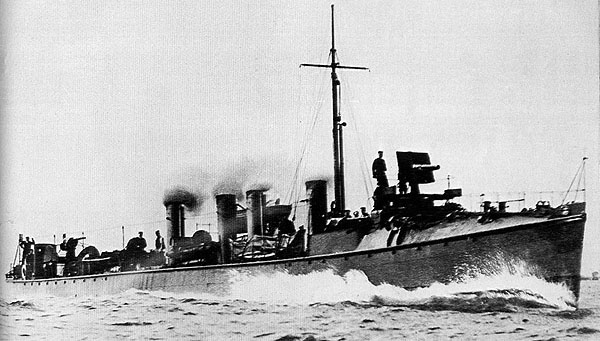
- HMS Hornet

History

United Kingdom
- Name: HMS Hornet
- Builder: Yarrow & Company, Poplar, London
- Cost: £ 36,112
- Laid down: 1 July 1892
- Launched: 23 December 1893
- Completed: July 1894
- Fate: Sold 12 October 1909 for scrapping.

General characteristics
- Class & type: Havock-class torpedo boat destroyer
- Displacement: 240 long tons (240 t) light; 275 long tons (279 t) full load
- Length: 185 ft (56 m) oa; 180 ft (55 m) pp
- Beam: 18 ft 6 in (5.64 m)
- Draught: 7 ft 6 in (2.29 m)
- Installed power: 3,700 ihp (2,800 kW)
- Propulsion: 8 × Yarrow water-tube boilers (Note: These 8 boilers were very small examples, mounted side-by-side in pairs and feeding the 4 funnels. Lyon queried this number as a possible misreading for a figure 3 although the original drawings show 8 boilers. This 8 Yarrow boiler layout would also be used in the Sunfish class of 1894 but later TBDs with Yarrow boilers, such as the Greyhounds of 1899 used 4 larger boilers, one abreast.); 2 × triple-expansion steam engines; 2 shafts
- Speed: 27 kn (50 km/h; 31 mph)
- Range: 47 tons of coal carried
- Complement: 46
- Armament: 1 × 12-pounder gun; 3 × 6-pounder guns; 3 × torpedo tubes (2 later removed)

HMS Hornet was a Havock-class torpedo boat destroyer of the British Royal Navy. She was launched in 1893 and sold in 1909 for scrapping. Although the Daring-class torpedo boat destroyers were ordered first, Havock and Hornet were completed faster, making them the first destroyers ever built.

== Design and construction ==
In April 1892, the British Admiralty sent out a request to several shipbuilders for designs and tenders for "large sea going torpedo boats", or what later became known as "torpedo boat destroyers". In July 1892, it was decided to place an order with the two specialised torpedo-boat builders, Yarrows and Thornycroft for two ships each, with Yarrows' two ships named Havock and Hornet. While both Yarrow ships were powered by triple-expansion steam engines driving two shafts, they differed in the boilers used, with Havock using 2 conventional locomotive-type fire-tube boilers while Hornet used 8 Yarrow water tube boilers. (This resulted in Havock having 2 funnels while Hornet was fitted with 4 funnels). Gun armament consisted of a single 12 pounder (3 in (76 mm)) gun, three 6 pounder (57 mm) guns, while torpedo armament consisted of three 18 in (450 mm) torpedo tubes, with one fixed bow tube and two deck mounted tubes, with the two deck-mounted tubes in a single rotating mounting, pointing in opposite directions, so that enemies on either beam could be attacked at the same time.

== History ==
Hornet was laid down at Yarrow's Poplar, London yard on 1 July 1892. Hornet's water tube boilers meant that it took longer to build than Havock, launching on 23 December 1893 and completed in July 1894. The ship's performance during trials was generally successful, with only slight vibration noted and the ship steering well, and an average speed of 27.6 knots (51.1 km/h; 31.8 mph) being made over a three-hour trial. (Note: Speeds recorded during trials of early torpedo craft were significantly faster than obtainable during normal use as the trials were run in an unrepresentative light condition, without armament, ammunition or stores carried, and with hand-picked stokers.)

Hornet served almost all her service life in Home waters, although she did serve briefly in the Mediterranean in 1900. Hornet's bow structure was strengthened in 1901. While the bow torpedo tube was found to be of little use, as it adversely affected seakeeping and restricted space forward, with fears that the ship could over-run a torpedo fired from the bow tube, Hornet retained the bow tube, while the two deck mounted tubes were removed by 1902. In February 1902 she was ordered to replace Zebra as tender to Wildfire, special service vessel, for duties in connection with the Sheerness School of Gunnery. She took part in the Coronation Review for King Edward VII on 16 August 1902, with Lieutenant W. B. W. Grubb temporarily in command from 8 August. In late October 1902 she was at Sheerness dockyard for a refit.

== Fate ==
A survey in February 1909 found that Hornet's hull was in poor condition, with buckling of the hull plating and estimated repair costs of £4,050. She was sold on 12 October 1909 for scrapping.
