= HMS Decoy (1894) =

Daring-class destroyer

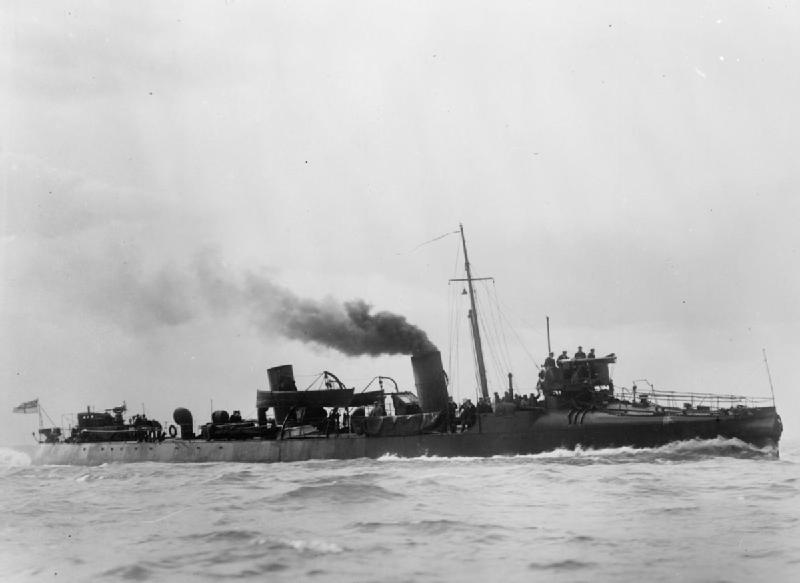
- Decoy

History

United Kingdom
- Name: Decoy
- Builder: John I. Thornycroft & Company, Chiswick
- Cost: c.£36,000
- Yard number: 288
- Laid down: July 1892
- Launched: 7 February 1894
- Completed: June 1895
- Fate: Sunk in collision, 13 August 1904

General characteristics
- Class & type: Daring-class torpedo boat destroyer
- Displacement: 260 long tons (264 t) light; 287.8 long tons (292 t) full load
- Length: 185 ft (56 m) oa
- Beam: 19 ft (5.8 m)
- Draught: 7 ft (2.1 m)
- Installed power: 4,200 hp (3,100 kW)
- Propulsion: 2 Thornycroft water-tube boilers; 2 × triple-expansion steam engines; 2 shafts
- Speed: 27 kn (31 mph; 50 km/h)
- Crew: 46-53
- Armament: 1 × QF 12 pounder 12 cwt naval gun; 3 × 6 pounder QF guns; 3 × 18 inch (450mm) torpedo (Note: British "18-inch torpedoes" were 450mm (17.72 inches) in diameter.) tubes

HMS Decoy was a Daring-class torpedo boat destroyer which served with the Royal Navy in home waters. She was launched in 1895 and sunk in a collision with the destroyer HMS Arun in 1904.

== Construction ==
She was built by John I. Thornycroft & Company at Chiswick and was launched on 7 February 1894.

Although fitted with multiple torpedo tubes, her bow tube proved useless in practice as — while running at high attack speeds — the ship was prone to overtake its own torpedo. The clumsy tube also reduced living quarters and made the bridge very prone to flooding.

== Service ==
Decoy took part in the 1896 British Naval Manoeuvres, attached to the Channel Fleet operation from Berehaven in southern Ireland. She served as instructional tender to Cambridge, a gunnery school ship, until August 1901. Lieutenant Cyril Asser was appointed in command in February 1902, when she was based at Plymouth as part of the Devonport instructional flotilla, and was succeeded by Lieutenant Henry Ralph Heathcote on 1 July the same year. Heathcote transferred to Contest the following month, and was succeeded in command by Lieutenant L. J. I. Hammond on 8 August 1902. She took part in the fleet review held at Spithead on 16 August 1902 for the coronation of King Edward VII. She acted temporary as tender to Cambridge again from late August, when her crew transferred to HMS Ostrich, which took her place in the flotilla. The following month she was reported to be back in the instructional flotilla.

Decoy was lost in a collision with the destroyer Arun off the Scilly Islands on 13 August 1904. while taking part in night exercises. One man was killed while the remaining 40 members of the crew were rescued by Arun and Sturgeon. Courts martial regarding the sinking were subsequently assembled aboard the battleship Conqueror. The first, on 22 August, attributed blame to the commander of Arun, Reginald Tyrwhitt. The second, an appeal, was held on 30 August, and dismissed the charge of neglect but confirmed the charge of hazarding both vessels.

== Bibliography ==
- Brassey, T.A. (1897). The Naval Annual 1897. Portsmouth, UK: J. Griffin and Co.
- Chesneau, Roger & Kolesnik, Eugene M., eds. (1979). Conway's All The World's Fighting Ships 1860–1905. London: Conway Maritime Press. ISBN 0-85177-133-5.
- Colledge, J. J.; Warlow, Ben (2006) [1969]. Ships of the Royal Navy: The Complete Record of All Fighting Ships of the Royal Navy from the 15th Century to the Present (3rd Rev ed.). London: Chatham Publishing. ISBN 978-1-86176-281-8. OCLC 67375475.
- Dittmar, F. J.; Colledge, J. J. (1972). British Warships 1914–1919. Shepperton, UK: Ian Allan. ISBN 0-7110-0380-7.
- Friedman, Norman (2009). British Destroyers: From Earliest Days to the Second World War. Barnsley, UK: Seaforth Publishing. ISBN 978-1-84832-049-9.
- Kemp, Paul (1999). The Admiralty Regrets: British Warship Losses of the 20th Century. Sutton Publishing Ltd. ISBN 0-7509-1567-6.
- Lyon, David (2001) [1996]. The First Destroyers. London: Caxton Editions. ISBN 1-84067-364-8.
- Manning, Thomas Davys (1961). The British Destroyer. Putnam & Co. OCLC 6470051.
- March, Edgar J. (1966). British Destroyers: A History of Development, 1892–1953; Drawn by Admiralty Permission From Official Records & Returns, Ships' Covers & Building Plans. London: Seeley Service. OCLC 164893555.
