= HMS Havock (1893) =

Havock-class destroyer

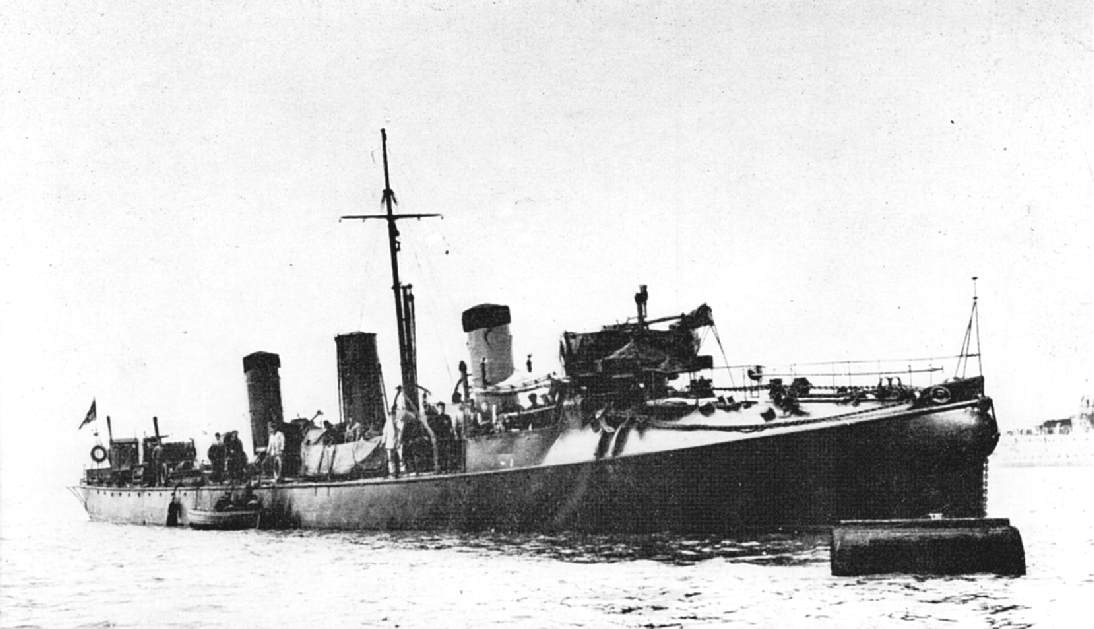
- HMS Havock

History

United Kingdom
- Name: HMS Havock
- Ordered: 2 July 1892
- Builder: Yarrow & Company, Cubitt Town, London
- Cost: £36,526
- Laid down: 1 July 1892
- Launched: 12 August 1893
- Commissioned: January 1894
- Out of service: 1911
- Fate: Sold 14 May 1912

General characteristics
- Class & type: Havock-class destroyer
- Displacement: 240 long tons (244 t) light; 275 long tons (279 t) full load
- Length: 185 ft (56.4 m) oa; 180 ft (54.9 m) pp
- Beam: 18 ft 6 in (5.64 m)
- Draught: 7 ft 6 in (2.29 m)
- Installed power: c. 3,700 ihp (2,800 kW)
- Propulsion: 2 × locomotive boilers; 2 × triple-expansion steam engines; 2 shafts
- Speed: 27 knots (50 km/h)
- Range: 3,000 nautical miles (5,600 km) (5,600 km)
- Complement: 46
- Armament: 1 × 12-pounder gun; 3 × 6-pounder guns; 3 (later 2) × 18-inch (450mm) torpedo tubes (Note: British "18-inch torpedoes" were 450mm (17.72 inches) in diameter.)

HMS Havock was a Havock-class torpedo boat destroyer of the British Royal Navy built by the Yarrow shipyard. She was one of the first destroyers ordered by the Royal Navy, and the first to be delivered.

== Design and construction ==
Havock had a full load displacement of 275 tons and a speed of 27 knots (50 km/h). She differed from her sister ship in having 2 locomotive boilers placed end-to-end, while Hornet had 8 water tube boilers. This resulted in an obvious external difference, since Hornet had 4 funnels (with the centre pair close together) while Havock had 2 closely spaced funnels. She was launched on 12 August 1893.

== Armament ==
Havock had a single 12-pounder gun mounted on a pedestal at the conning position, an exposed location that was extremely wet in even moderately rough weather. Three 6 pounder QF guns were mounted, with two either side of, and slightly abaft of, the conning position, and the third placed near the stern just aft of the torpedo tubes. Three 18-inch (450mm) torpedo tubes were fitted, with two in a turntable towards the stern, able to fire on either side. The third torpedo tube was fitted at the bow, with the torpedo ejected from the tube by a gunpowder charge. This fitting was later removed, as it was found that the fitting was extremely exposed, and the boat had a tendency to outpace its own torpedo when running at high speed.

== Career ==
Havock "behaved well" on trials in late 1893, with her top speed indicating that she was capable of keeping up with battleships. It was noted that her trial demonstrated better fuel efficiency than her sister, Hornet.

In 1896 Havock was in reserve at Portsmouth. In 1899–1900 she was re-boilered with conventional ship water tube boilers, changing her silhouette to have three funnels, with the centre one somewhat thicker than the others. By this period such a layout was considered standard for torpedo boat destroyers.

Havock's career was spent entirely around the British Isles.

Lieutenant H. C. J. R. West was appointed in command on 1 March 1902, and shortly thereafter commissioned her for service with the Medway Instructional Flotilla. Her officers and crew were transferred to the destroyer Haughty in early May 1902, and she was commissioned on 8 May as tender to Wildfire, the shore establishment at Sheerness. She took part in the Coronation Review for King Edward VII on 16 August 1902, with Lieutenant L. T. Jones temporarily in command from 8 August.

== Fate ==
Havock was sold on 14 May 1912 and was broken up.

== Bibliography ==
- Chesneau, Roger & Kolesnik, Eugene M., eds. (1979). Conway's All The World's Fighting Ships 1860–1905. London: Conway Maritime Press. ISBN 0-85177-133-5.
- Colledge, J. J.; Warlow, Ben (2006) [1969]. Ships of the Royal Navy: The Complete Record of All Fighting Ships of the Royal Navy from the 15th Century to the Present (3rd Rev ed.). London: Chatham Publishing. ISBN 978-1-86176-281-8. OCLC 67375475.
- Friedman, Norman (2009). British Destroyers: From Earliest Days to the Second World War. Barnsley, UK: Seaforth Publishing. ISBN 978-1-84832-049-9.
- Gardiner, Robert & Gray, Randal, eds. (1985). Conway's All The World's Fighting Ships 1906–1921. London: Conway Maritime Press. ISBN 0-85177-245-5.
- Lyon, David (2001) [1996]. The First Destroyers. London: Caxton Editions. ISBN 1-84067-364-8.
- Manning, T. D. (1961). The British Destroyer. Putnam & Co. OCLC 6470051.
- March, Edgar J. (1966). British Destroyers: A History of Development, 1892–1953; Drawn by Admiralty Permission From Official Records & Returns, Ships' Covers & Building Plans. London: Seeley Service. OCLC 164893555.
