= Great Gold Robbery =

1855 British train heist

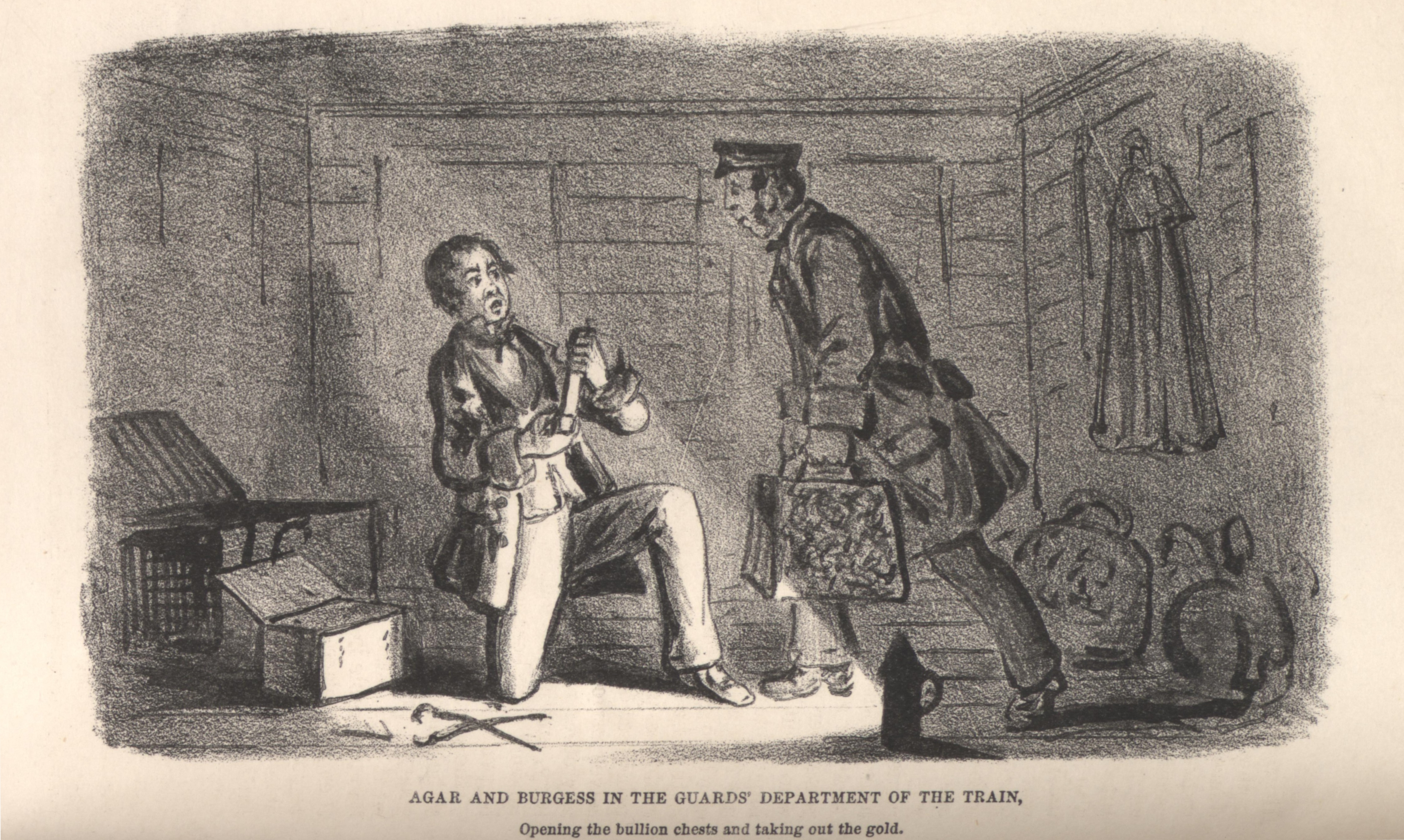
Contemporary news illustration of Agar and Burgess in the guard's van, emptying the safes of the gold

The Great Gold Robbery took place on the night of 15 May 1855, when a routine shipment of three boxes of gold bullion and coins was stolen from the guard's van of the service between London Bridge station and Folkestone while it was being shipped to Paris. The robbers comprised four men, two of whom—William Tester and James Burgess—were employees of the South Eastern Railway (SER), the company that ran the rail service. They were joined by the planners of the crime: Edward Agar, a career criminal, and William Pierce, a former employee of the SER who had been dismissed for being a gambler.

During transit, the gold was held in "railway safes", which needed two keys to open. The men took wax impressions of the keys and made their own copies. When they knew a shipment was taking place, Tester ensured Burgess was on guard duty, and Agar hid in the guard's van. They emptied the safes of 224 pounds (102 kg) of gold, valued at the time at £12,000 (approximately equivalent to £1,117,000 in 2025), then left the train at Dover. The theft was not discovered until the safes arrived in Paris. The police and railway authorities had no clues as to who had undertaken the theft, and arguments ensued as to whether it had been stolen in England, on the ship crossing the English Channel, or on the French leg of the journey.

When Agar was arrested for another crime, he asked Pierce to provide Fanny Kay—his former girlfriend—and child with funds. Pierce agreed and then reneged. In need of money, Kay went to the governor of Newgate Prison and told him who had undertaken the theft. Agar was questioned, admitted his guilt and testified as a witness. Pierce, Tester and Burgess were all arrested, tried and found guilty of the theft. Pierce received a sentence of two years' hard labour in England; Tester and Burgess were sentenced to penal transportation for 14 years.

The crime was the subject of a television play in 1960, with Colin Blakely as Pierce. The Great Train Robbery, a novel by the writer and director Michael Crichton, was published in 1975. Crichton adapted his work into a feature film, The First Great Train Robbery, with Sean Connery portraying Pierce.

== Background ==
=== South Eastern Railway ===
South Eastern Railway (SER)

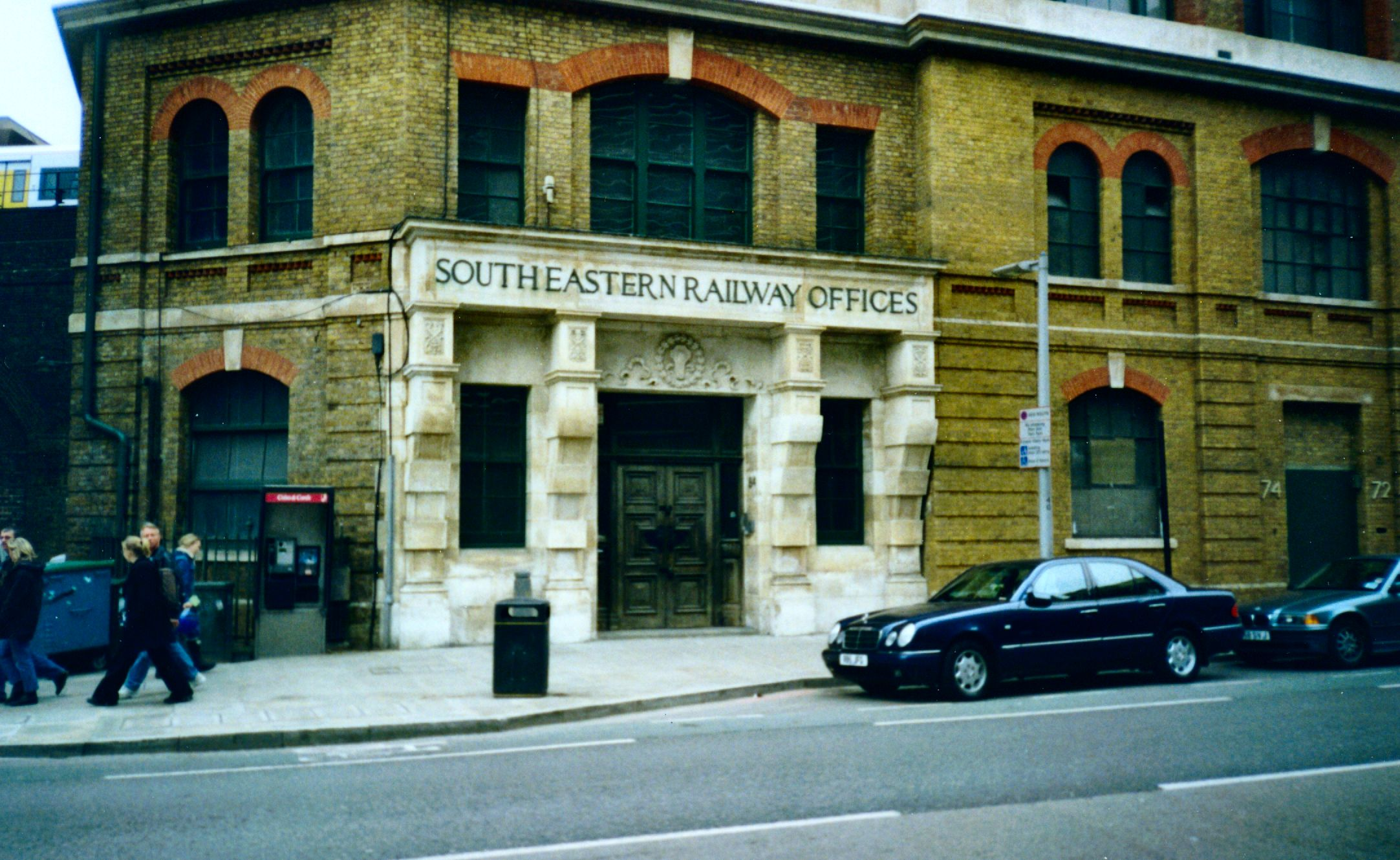
Headquarters of the SER, near London Bridge station

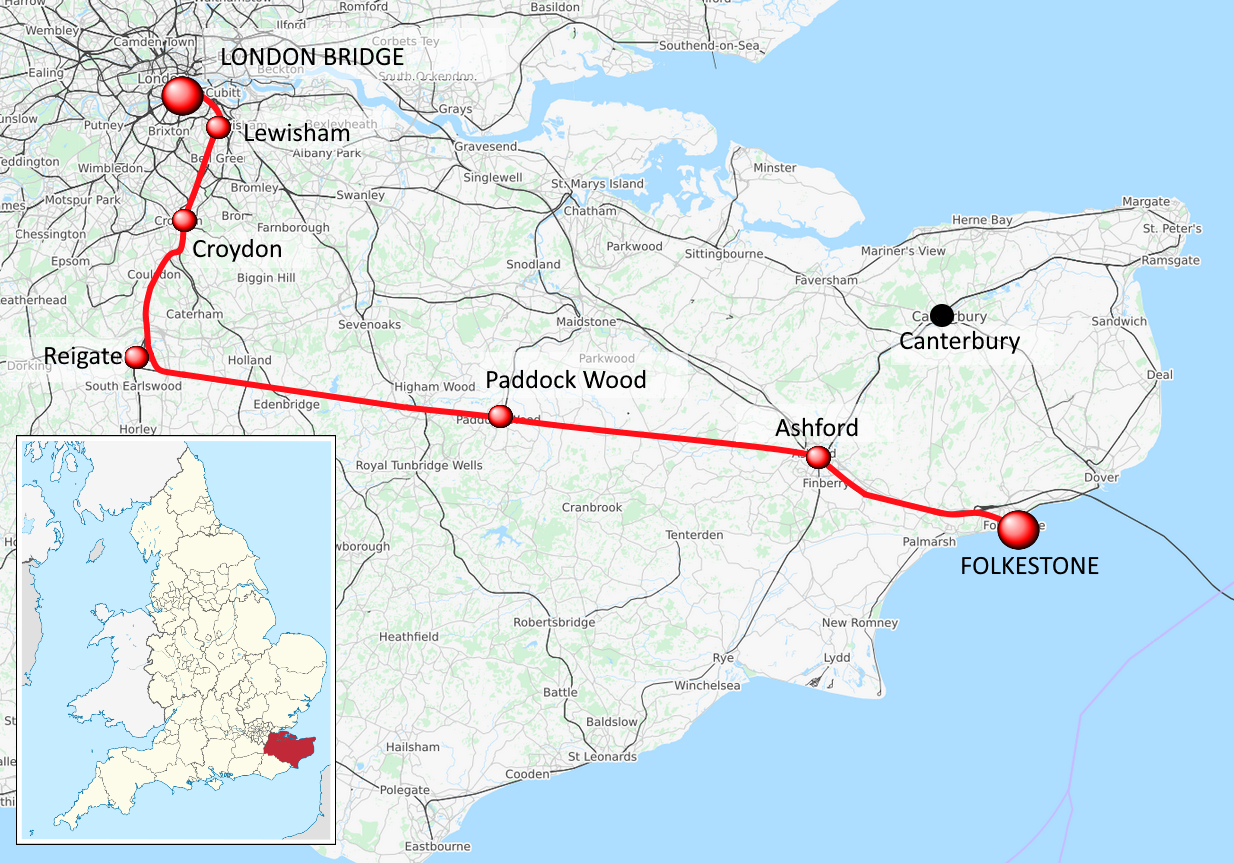
Route of the SER, from London Bridge to Folkestone

In 1855 the South Eastern Railway (SER) ran a boat train service between London Bridge station and Folkestone, on the south coast of England. It provided part of the main route to Paris at the time, with a railway steamer from Folkestone to Boulogne-sur-Mer, northern France, and a train to complete the journey direct to Paris. The service ran at 8:00 am, 11:30 am and 4:30 pm; there was also an overnight mail service that left at 8:30 pm and a tidal ferry service. Periodically the line would carry shipments of gold from bullion merchants in London to their counterparts in Paris; these could be several hundredweights at a time. The bullion would be packed into wooden boxes, bound with iron hoops and with a wax seal bearing the coat of arms of the bullion dealers in question: Abell & Co, Adam Spielmann & Co and Messrs Bult & Co. The agents who arranged the carriage of the gold, including collecting the bullion from the three companies and delivering it to London Bridge, were Chaplin & Co. The gold shipments always went on the 8:30 pm train. At Boulogne the bullion boxes were collected by the French agents Messageries impériales before being transported by train to the Gare du Nord and then to the Bank of France.

As a security measure, the boxes were weighed when they were loaded onto the guard's van, at Folkestone, on arrival at Boulogne and then again on arrival in Paris. The company's guard's vans were fitted with three patented "railway safes" provided by Chubb & Son. These had three-foot (0.91 m) sides and were made of one-inch-thick (2.5 cm) steel. Access to the safe was through its lid, which was hinged for access; the exterior had two keyholes, high on the front. Each of the three safes had the same pair of locks, meaning that only two keys were needed to open all three safes. Copies of the keys were held separately by SER officials at London Bridge and Folkestone, and the company ensured no individual could hold both keys at the same time.

=== Participants ===
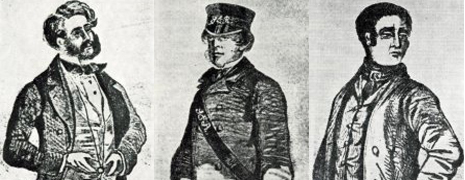
William Tester, James Burgess and Edward Agar in court

The originator of the plan was William Pierce, a 37-year-old former employee of the SER who had been dismissed from its service after it was found that he was a gambler; he worked as a ticket printer in a betting shop after leaving the company. According to the historian Donald Thomas, Pierce was "a large-faced and rather clumsy man with a taste for loud waistcoats and fancy trousers. ... he was described as 'imperfectly educated'. The turf was his true schooling".

The burglar and safe-cracker Edward Agar was just under 40 at the time of the robbery and had been a professional thief since he was 18. He returned to the UK in 1853 after ten years spent in Australia and the US. He had £3,000 in government consol bonds and lived in the fashionable area of Shepherd's Bush, London. (Note: £3,000 in 1853 equates to approximately £330,000 in 2025, according to calculations based on the Consumer Price Index measure of inflation.) According to Thomas, the robbery "grew almost entirely from the absolute self-confidence and mental ability" of Agar.

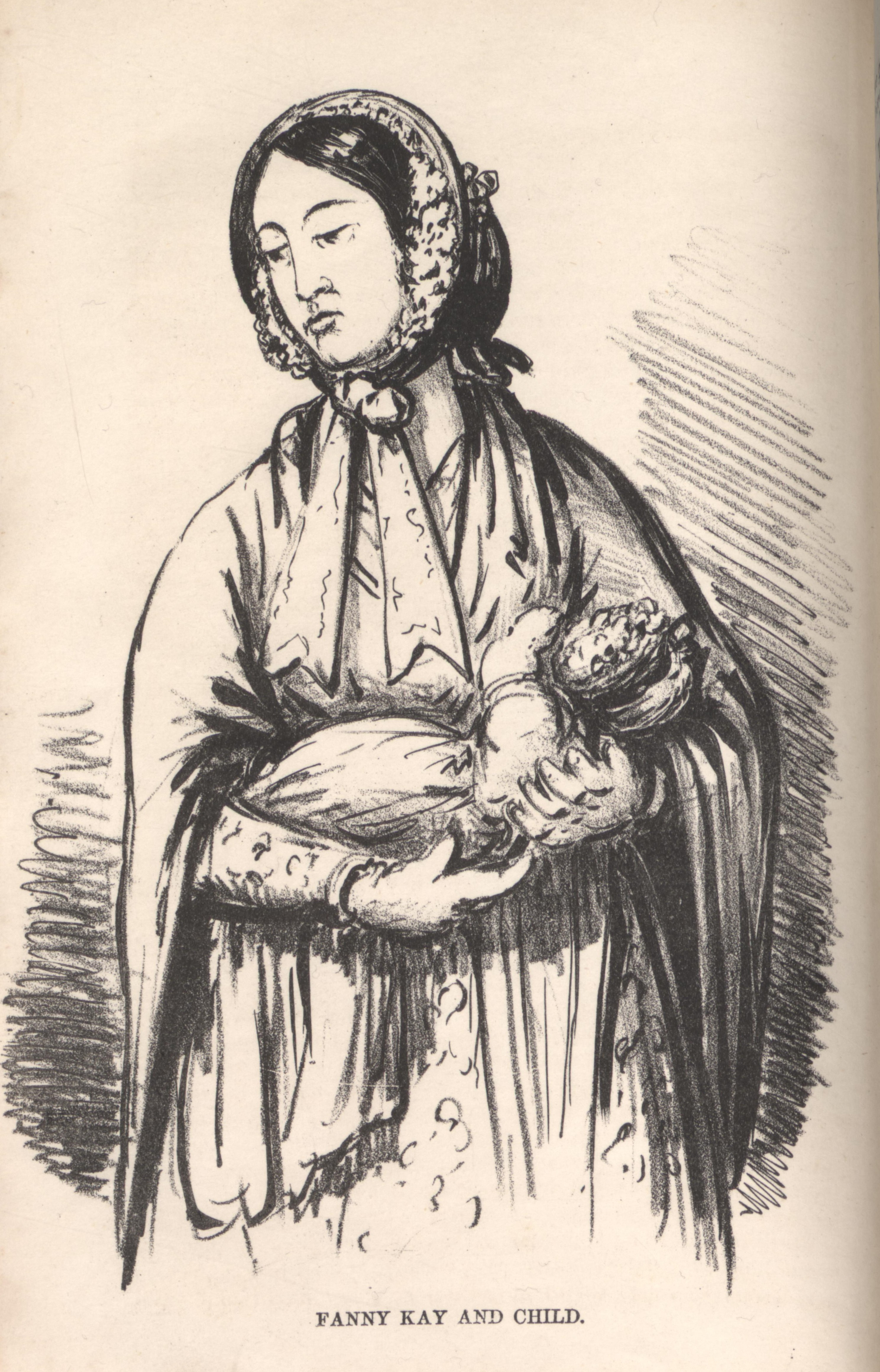
Fanny Kay—Agar's partner—with their child

James Burgess was a married, thrifty and respectable man who had worked at the SER since it had started running the Folkestone line in 1843. He worked for the company as a guard, and was often in charge of the trains that carried the bullion. As with many railwaymen of the time, Burgess's wages had been reduced as the railway boom had passed.

Fanny Kay, aged 23 in 1855, was Agar's partner and lived with him at his house, Cambridge Villa, in Shepherd's Bush. She had previously been an attendant at Tunbridge railway station and had been introduced to Agar by Burgess in 1853. She had a child with Agar and moved in with him in December 1854.

William Tester was a well-educated man who wore a monocle and had a desire to improve his position; he was briefly employed after the robbery as a general manager for a Swedish railway company. He worked in the traffic department at London Bridge station as the assistant to the superintendent, which gave him access to information about the carriage of valuable goods and the guards' rota.

James Townshend Saward, also known as Jim (or Jem) the Penman, was a barrister and special pleader at the Inner Temple. His activities were described by contemporary sources as "planning and perfecting schemes of fraud, the bold audacity of which is equalled only by their success". He was the head of a forgery gang who had been practising cheque fraud for several years.

== Planning and preparation ==
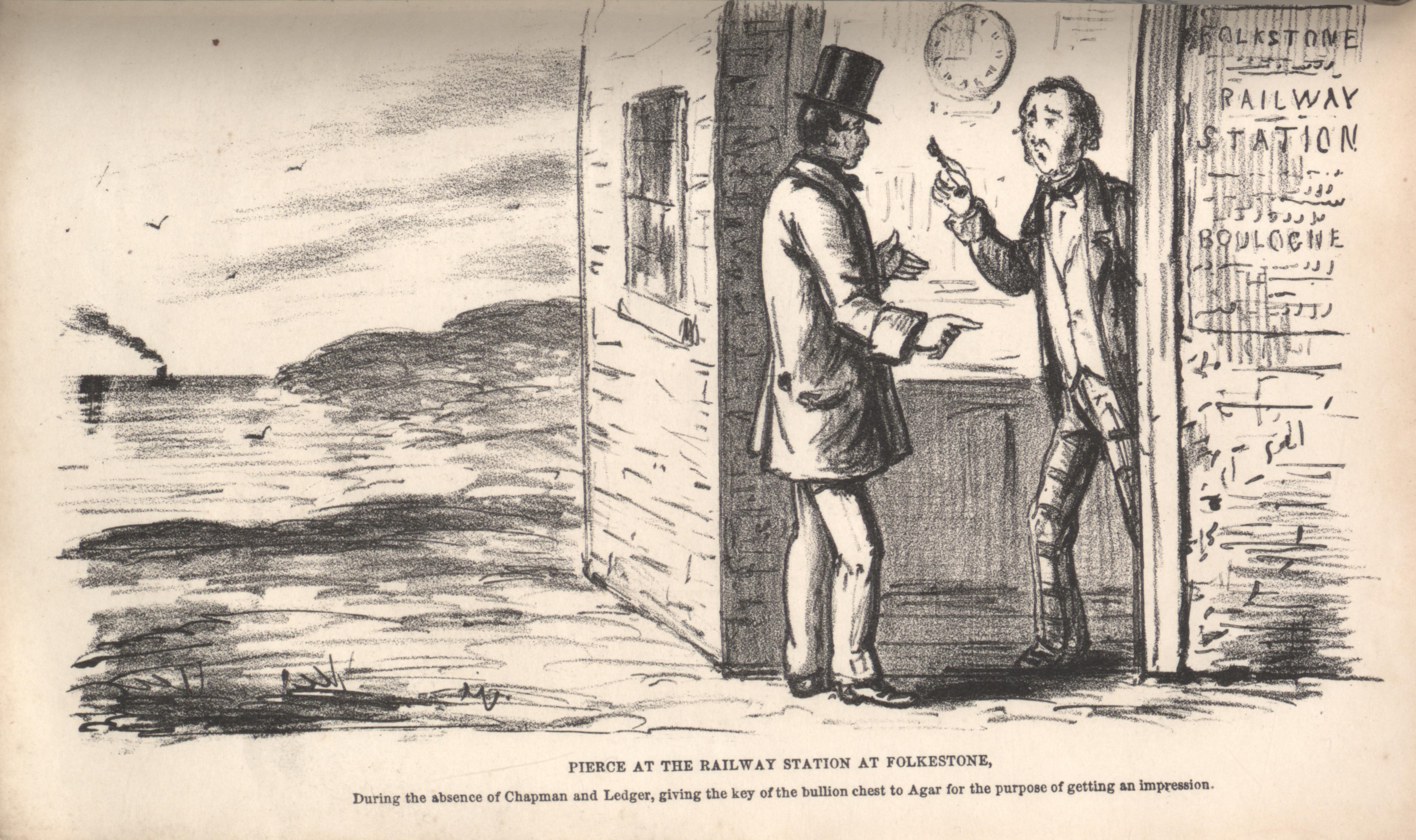
Pierce giving a Chubb key to Agar at the Folkestone railway station

After being dismissed from the SER, Pierce continued to drink in the pubs and beer shops around London Bridge in which railway employees also drank. Over time he picked up detailed information about the gold shipments to Paris, while he watched and planned. He concluded that a theft would only be possible if he obtained copies of the keys to the safe. He relayed his thoughts to Agar before the latter's visit to the US; at the time Agar declined to take part, telling his friend the scheme was impracticable. When Agar returned to Britain, the two discussed the possibility again and Agar said that "it would be impossible to do it unless an impression of the keys could be procured". Pierce said he thought he knew how that could be arranged. They realised that for any theft to succeed, they needed the assistance of a guard travelling in the van with the safes, and an official with access to the staff rotas and who knew when the bullion shipments were to be made. It was at this stage that Pierce recruited Burgess and Tester to join the group.

In May 1854 Pierce and Agar travelled to Folkestone to watch the process involved at that end of the line, particularly the location and security surrounding the keys. They spent so long, and were so obvious, in their surveillance that they came to the notice of the SER's own police force and the Folkestone Borough Police. As a result, Pierce returned to London and left Agar to watch alone. As part of his intelligence gathering, Agar drank in the Rose Inn, a public house near the pier, where railway staff also drank. The pair concluded that one of the keys was carried by the superintendent of the Folkestone end of the line; the other was locked in a cabinet at the railway offices on Folkestone pier.

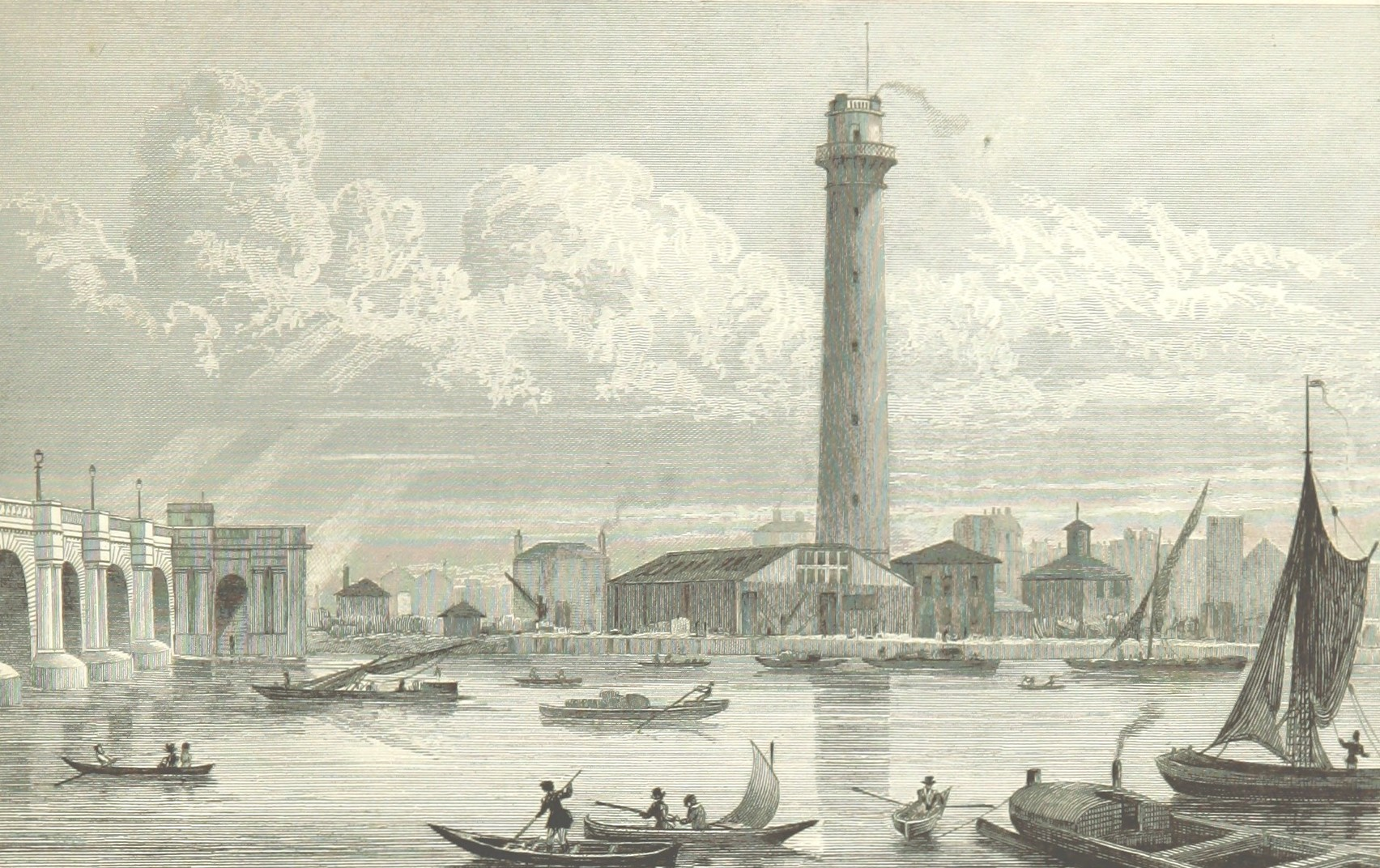
The Shot Tower, Lambeth, in 1828

One of the keys held at Folkestone was lost in July 1854 by Captain Mold of the steamship company. (Note: Mold was dismissed by the company for this error, so seriously was it taken.) The SER sent the safes back to Chubb for the locks to be reconditioned and new keys issued. The clerk involved in corresponding with the company was Tester. By October, Chubb's work had been completed and the keys sent to the SER. Tester was able to smuggle them out of the office briefly, and met Pierce and Agar in a beer house on Tooley Street, London, where Agar made an impression of them in green wax. Tester was so nervous when he removed the keys, that he brought two identical ones with him, rather than one for each lock; the plotters were still missing one of the keys. Agar, using the false name of E. E. Archer, used his own funds to send £200 of gold sovereigns on the SER line. (Note: £200 in 1854 equates to approximately £19,000 in 2025, according to calculations based on Consumer Price Index measure of inflation.) The box of bullion, labelled "E. R. Archer, care of Mr. Ledger, or Mr. Chapman", was sent through to Folkestone where Agar would collect it. Agar collected the package from the SER office and watched while the company's superintendent retrieved the safe key from a cupboard at the back of the room. Knowing where the keys were stored, the following weekend Agar and Pierce stayed in nearby Dover and walked to Folkestone. When the boat arrived from Boulogne, both members of the SER staff left the office to meet it; they left the door unlocked when they left. Pierce entered the office while Agar waited at the door on lookout. Pierce opened the cupboard and took the safe key to Agar who made a wax impression. The key was returned, and the two men returned to London via Dover.

Over the following months Pierce and Agar created rough keys from the impressions they had taken. In April and May 1855 Agar would travel along the Folkestone route when Burgess was on duty—seven or eight trips in total—and would hone the keys until they worked smoothly and without effort. Pierce and Agar then separately visited the Shot Tower, Lambeth, where they obtained two long hundredweight (220 lb; 100 kg) of lead shot. They also obtained courier bags, which could be strapped under a cloak, and carpet bags: these were to carry the lead shot onto the train, and the gold off it.

By May 1855 the men were now ready to carry out the robbery, and only needed to wait for a day when a gold shipment was taking place. Tester altered the staff rosters to ensure Burgess was working on the evening mail service for the month to ensure Agar had access to the safe. A signal was arranged whereby either Agar or Pierce would wait outside London Bridge station every day; if a shipment was being made, Burgess would walk out of the station and wipe his face with a white handkerchief to alert them. At the same time, Tester would travel to Redhill railway station and await the first stop of the train. He would take one of the bags of gold and return to London.

== Robbery: 15 May 1855 ==
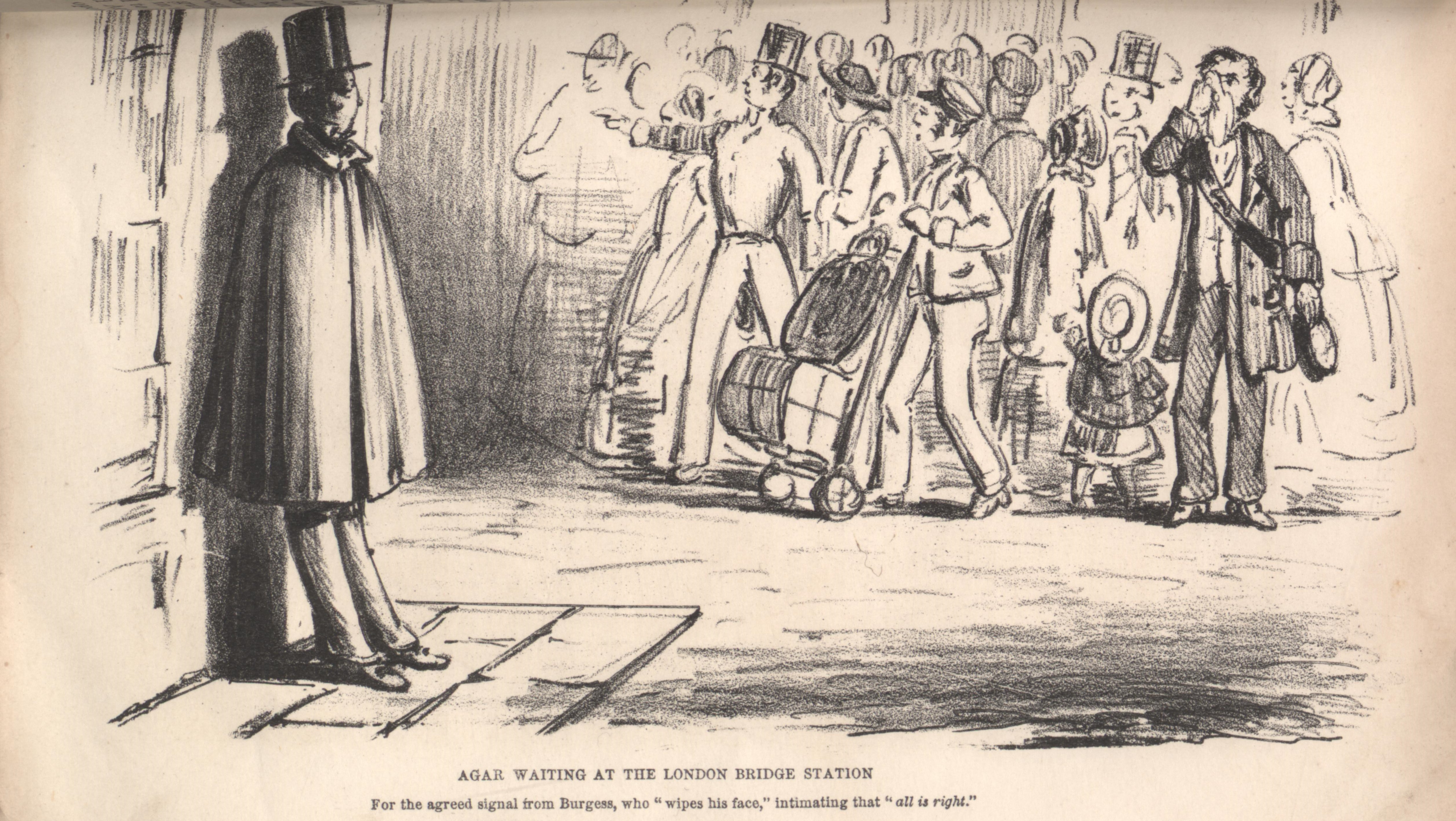
Agar waiting at the London Bridge Station for news of the train

On 15 May 1855, while Agar was waiting outside London Bridge station, Burgess came out of the station, wiped his face with his handkerchief and went back inside. Agar notified Pierce and the two men purchased first-class tickets for the journey to Folkestone. They gave their bags to Burgess for storage in the guard's van during the journey and, just before the train was due to leave, Pierce took his seat in the compartment, and Agar slipped into the guard's van and hid in the corner, covered by Burgess's overalls.

As soon as the train departed the station, Agar began work. Only one of the locks was secured—an SER employee later reported that typically only one lock was used—and Agar soon had the bullion boxes out of the safe. Instead of opening the box through the front, he used pincers to pull the rivets out of the iron bands that bound the box, and used wedges in the reverse of the box to open the lid without too much visible damage. He removed gold bars from inside the box from Abell & Co, (Note: Agar, in his testimony, refers to four gold bars; David Hanrahan, in his history of the robbery, states it was six bars.) weighed them with the scales he was carrying in the bag, and put the same weight of lead shot back into the box. He nailed the bars back around the box, then resealed a wax seal on the front, using a die he had made himself, rather than one of the official seals of the bullion dealers. He deduced—correctly—that on the poorly lit station at Folkestone, a cursory glance at the seals would not show any change. He managed to do this before the train arrived at Redhill, which was a 35-minute journey from London Bridge. When it arrived at Redhill, Agar again hid, while Tester was handed the bag containing some of the gold. He returned to the SER offices in London, as arranged, so that he could be seen by colleagues and give himself an alibi for later. Pierce took the opportunity to leave his carriage and join his confederates in the guard's van.

The other two boxes were examined after the train left Redhill. The box from Adam Spielmann & Co contained hundreds of American gold eagles worth $10 each; (Note: $10 in 1855 equates to approximately $350 in 2025, according to calculations based on Consumer Price Index measure of inflation.) these were weighed and lead shot was again left in their place before the box was resealed. The final box, from Messrs Bult & Co, contained more gold bars. These weighed more than the remaining lead they had left and many of the ingots were left behind to ensure there were no major differences in the weights of the boxes when they were later weighed. When they replaced the bands on the final box, it was damaged, but they repaired it as best they could and replaced it in the safe. The three men then cleared away the mess they had made—mostly splinters and drops of wax—and prepared themselves by strapping on the courier bags beneath their cloaks. When the train arrived in Folkestone at about 10:30 pm, Pierce and Agar hid in the van while the safes were removed by staff. They then left the van and entered the main part of the train, passing through until they reached first class, where they sat until it arrived in Dover. When the train reached Dover, Pierce and Agar alighted, collected their carpet bags full of gold from the guard's van, then went to a nearby hotel for supper. Agar threw the keys and tools into the sea before the two men returned to London on the 2:00 am train, which arrived at around 5:00 am. In total they had stolen 224 pounds (102 kg) of gold, valued at the time at £12,000. (Note: £12,000 in 1855 equates to approximately £1,117,000 in 2025, according to calculations based on Consumer Price Index measure of inflation.)

== Immediate aftermath ==
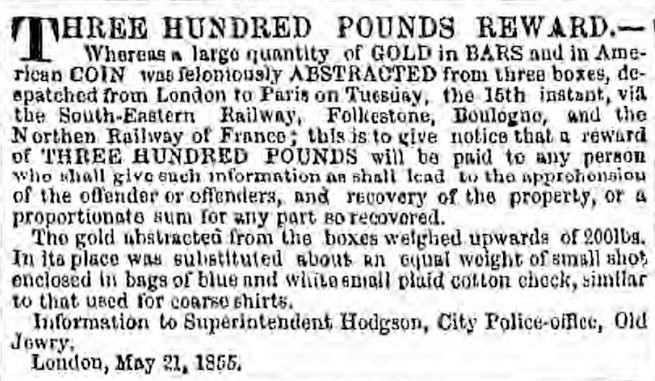
£300 reward notice, published in several newspapers

When the steamer carrying the gold arrived in Boulogne, one of the crew saw that the bullion boxes were damaged, but, as staff at Folkestone had not mentioned it, saw no cause for concern. The boxes were weighed on arrival at Boulogne where the box from Abell was found to be 40 pounds (18 kg) lighter than it had been in London, whereas the other boxes both weighed more. They were transported to Paris, where they were weighed again, with the same results as at Boulogne. When they were opened the lead shot was found and the news relayed back to London.

When the working day began on 16 May, Pierce and Agar went to a money-changer's shop with some of the American eagles and obtained £213 for them; at a second such shop, they exchanged 200 of them to get a cheque for just over £203. (Note: £200 in 1855 equates to approximately £22,000 in 2025, according to calculations based on the Consumer Price Index measure of inflation. The journalist Fergus Linnane states that £200 at the time was enough to buy a suburban villa.)

The three bullion merchants demanded recompense for the lost gold—most of Abell's gold was insured through the SER, but the company denied any culpability, claiming that the robbery must have taken place in France. The French authorities pointed out that as the weights of the boxes in France both matched, and differed from that in England, it must have occurred in the UK; both the French and British companies stated "that the crime was an impossibility", according to Thomas. (Note: An additional pointer, to the French authorities, was that the lead pellets were soft when bitten; British lead was known to be slightly softer than the French equivalent.) Newspapers reported that "It is supposed that so well planned a scheme could not have been executed in the rapid passage by railway from London to Folkestone". Burgess was examined, but not deemed a suspect because of his 14 years of service to the company. Tester had been seen at the SER offices while the train was still en route to Folkestone, so was also discounted as a potential thief. A reward of £300 was soon advertised in several newspapers for information regarding the case. (Note: £300 in 1855 equates to approximately £28,000 in 2025, according to calculations based on Consumer Price Index measure of inflation.) (Note: This included in The Times, The Morning Chronicle, The Morning Post and The Shipping and Mercantile Gazette.)

== Discovery, investigation and arrest ==
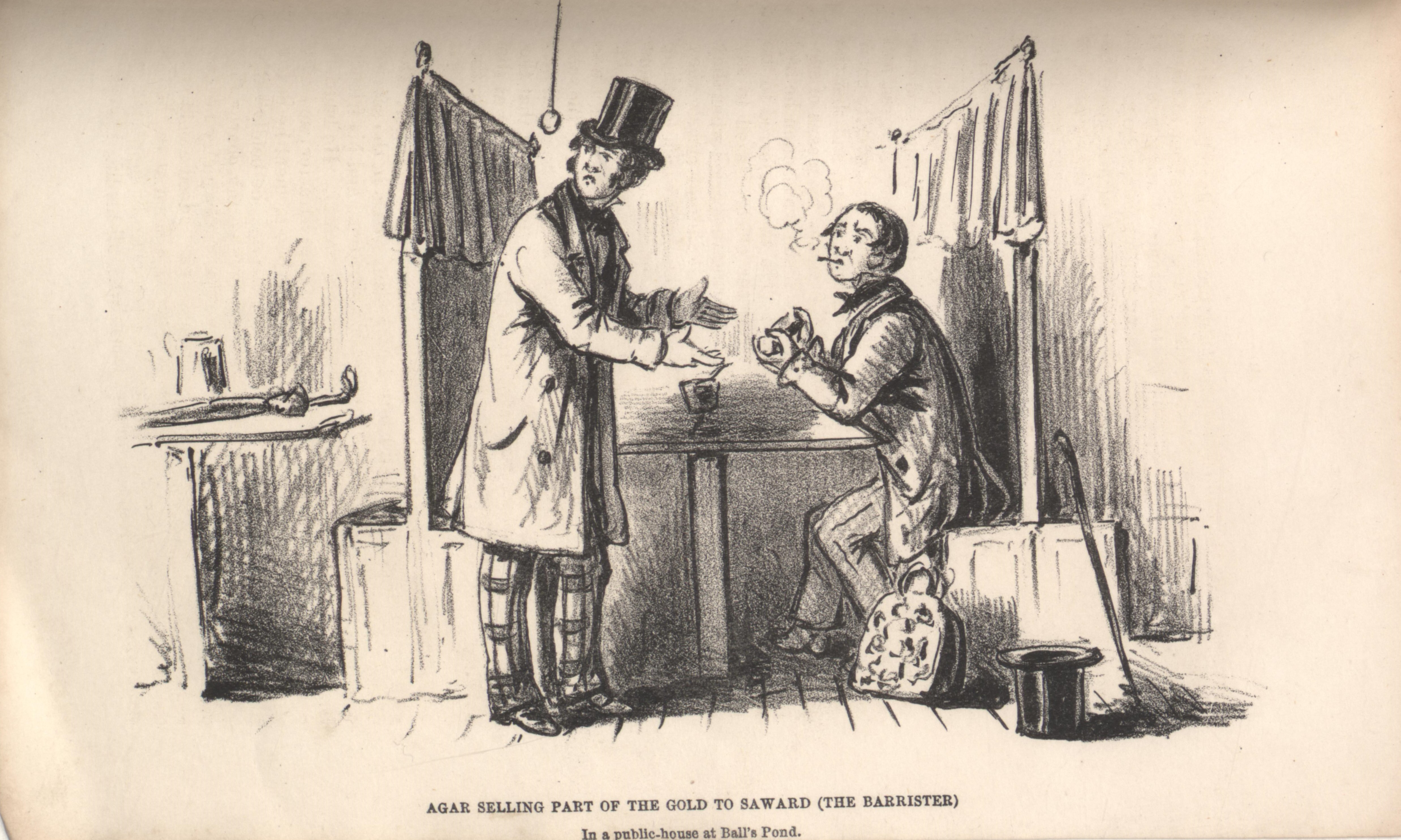
Agar selling part of the gold to Saward

Pierce and Agar began to melt down the bars to create new, smaller bars of 100 ounces (2.8 kg), although they briefly set fire to the floor of Cambridge Villa when one of the crucibles cracked, spilling molten gold. Relations between Agar and Kay deteriorated around this time, and he moved out of their house to stay with Pierce while they continued to process and dispose of the bullion.

£2,500 of bullion was sold to Saward, acting as a fence, and the proceeds split evenly between Agar, Pierce, Tester and Burgess. (Note: £2,500 in 1855 equates to approximately £233,000 in 2025, according to calculations based on Consumer Price Index measure of inflation.) Burgess invested his earnings in Turkish bonds, and shares in the brewing company Reid & Co; Pierce opened a betting shop near Covent Garden, telling friends he had won the capital by betting on Saucebox in the St Leger Stakes horse race at long odds. Tester put his money into Spanish Active bonds. That September he left the SER and became the general manager of a Swedish railway company.

At around the time Agar had separated from Kay, he met Emily Campbell, a 19-year-old prostitute, and the two began a relationship; Campbell's pimp, William Humphreys, took umbrage at the loss of her earnings. To overcome any problems, Agar lent Humphreys £235. When he went to collect the repaid money, he was arrested as one of Humphreys' associates passed him a bag of coins. Police stated that this was the proceeds of a cheque fraud in which he was involved and he was charged accordingly; Agar stated he knew nothing of the fraud, and he was trying to collect the money he had lent. Appearing at the Old Bailey in September 1855 on the charge of "feloniously forging and uttering an order for the payment of 700L [£700], with intend to defraud", (Note: £700 in 1855 equates to approximately £65,000 in 2025, according to calculations based on Consumer Price Index measure of inflation.) Agar was found guilty and sentenced to penal transportation for life. Awaiting transportation in Pentonville Prison, Agar arranged for his solicitor, Thomas Wontner, to use the £3,000 Agar had in his bank account, and give it to Pierce with instructions that it should be used to support Kay and their child. Pierce agreed, then reneged around mid-1856. Desperate for money, Kay went to see John Weatherhead, the governor of Newgate Prison, and told him that she knew who was involved in the SER bullion robbery. An investigation was undertaken at Cambridge Villa; the Metropolitan Police found evidence that corroborated her story, including the burnt floorboards, small specks of gold in the fireplace and under the floorboards, and evidence that the fireplace had been used at a very high temperature.

The Great Gold Robbery, in The Chronicles of Newgate

Agar was interviewed in October 1856, while still in Pentonville, by John Rees, the company solicitor for the SER; Agar refused to answer any questions, and so Rees returned around two weeks later and tried again. In the interim, Agar had heard that Pierce had not kept his word and so, angered by the deceit of his erstwhile partner, he turned Queen's evidence and gave Rees the full details of the crime. Pierce and Burgess were arrested on 5 November. As Tester was living in Sweden he could not be arrested, but he was informed that the police wanted to interview him. He voluntarily returned to England on 10 December and gave himself up to the Lord Mayor.

== Legal process ==
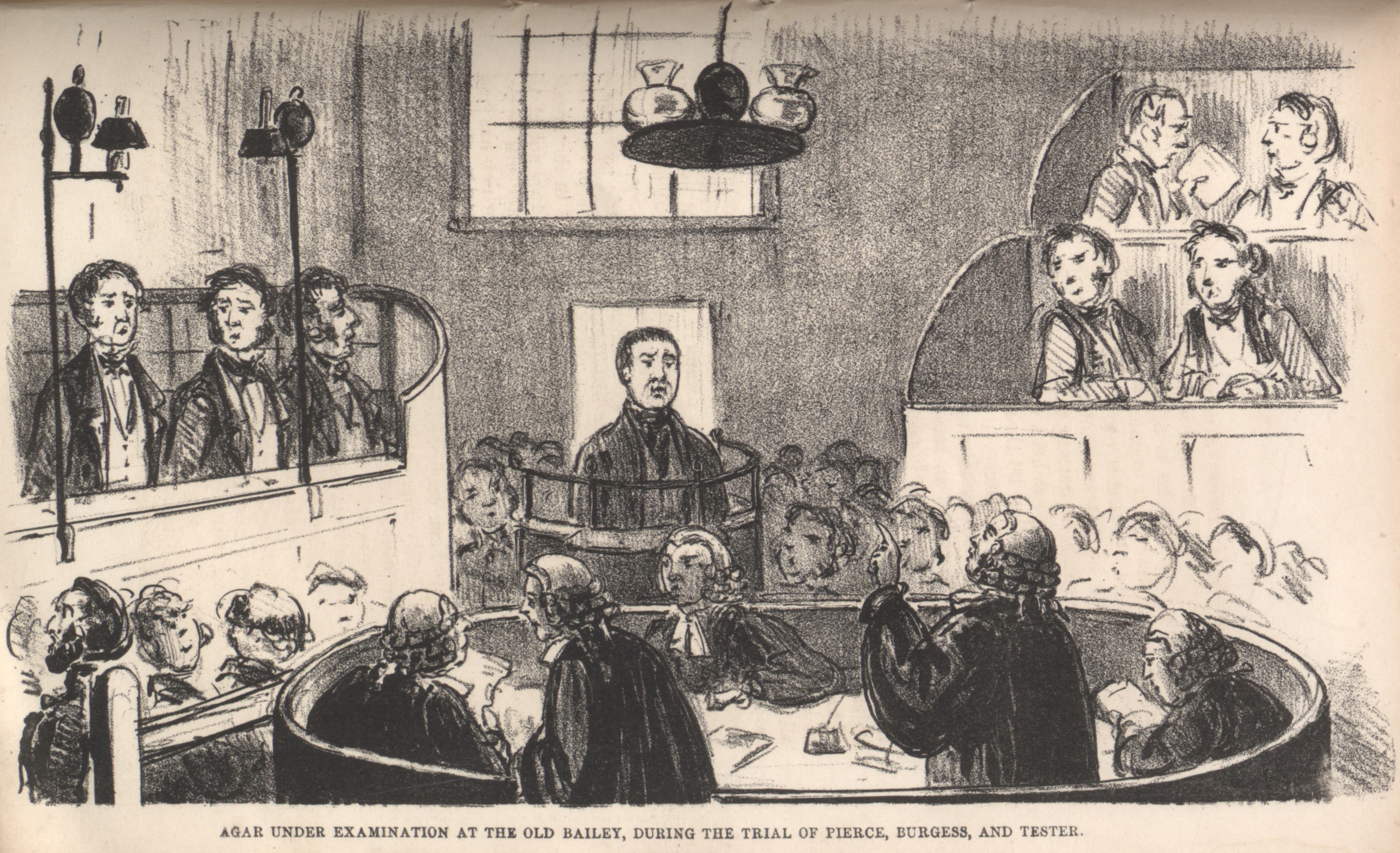
Agar under examination at the Old Bailey

In November and December 1856 hearings took place at the Mansion House, presided over by the Lord Mayor of London in his role as the Chief Magistrate of the City of London. (Note: The hearings were spread over several days: 6, 12, 13, 17 and 24 November, and 2, 10, 13 and 20 December 1856 and judgement on 24 December. They were held in front of two Lord Mayors, Sir David Salomons and his successor, Thomas Quested Finnis.) For the first two hearings, Agar was not present, but was brought to the court on the third day. When questioned, he confirmed the story he had given to the police, and identified pieces of evidence that had been gathered. On 10 December Tester appeared in court, having been dismissed from his position with the Swedish company. When the Lord Mayor gave his decision on 24 December that the three men were to stand trial for the robbery, Pierce said "I have nothing at all to say. I reserve my defence." Burgess and Tester both stated "I am not guilty".

The trial took place at the Old Bailey between 13 and 15 January 1857, and received wide coverage in newspapers across Britain. Burgess, Tester and Pierce all pleaded not guilty. Agar gave evidence against his former colleagues again, and told the court he was, in Thomas's words, "a self-confessed professional criminal who had not made an honest living since the age of eighteen". Witnesses included the locksmith John Chubb, the bullion dealers, transportation agents, SER staff, the station staff of London Bridge and Folkestone, a customs officer from Boulogne, railway police, taverners and hotel keepers. All corroborated Agar's story that the four men knew each other, and were present together at various stages of the planning and execution of the crime.

It took the jury ten minutes to decide on the guilt of the three men, Pierce of larceny, Burgess and Tester of larceny as a servant. The judge, Sir Samuel Martin, showed what the journalist Fergus Linnane calls "a grudging admiration" for Agar during his summing up:

The man Agar is a man who is as bad, I dare say, as bad can be, but that he is a man of most extraordinary ability no person who heard him examined can for a moment deny. ...
Something has been said of the romance connected with that man's character, but let those who fancy that there is anything great in it consider his fate. It is obvious ... that he is a man of extraordinary talent; that he gave to this and, perhaps, to many other robberies, an amount of care and perseverance one-tenth of which devoted to honest pursuits must have raised him to a respectable station in life, and considering the commercial activity of this country during the last twenty years, would probably have enabled him to realise a large fortune.

Burgess and Tester were both sentenced to penal transportation for 14 years. Pierce, as he was not a member of SER staff, was given the lighter sentence of two years' hard labour in England, three months of which would be in solitary confinement.

== Later ==
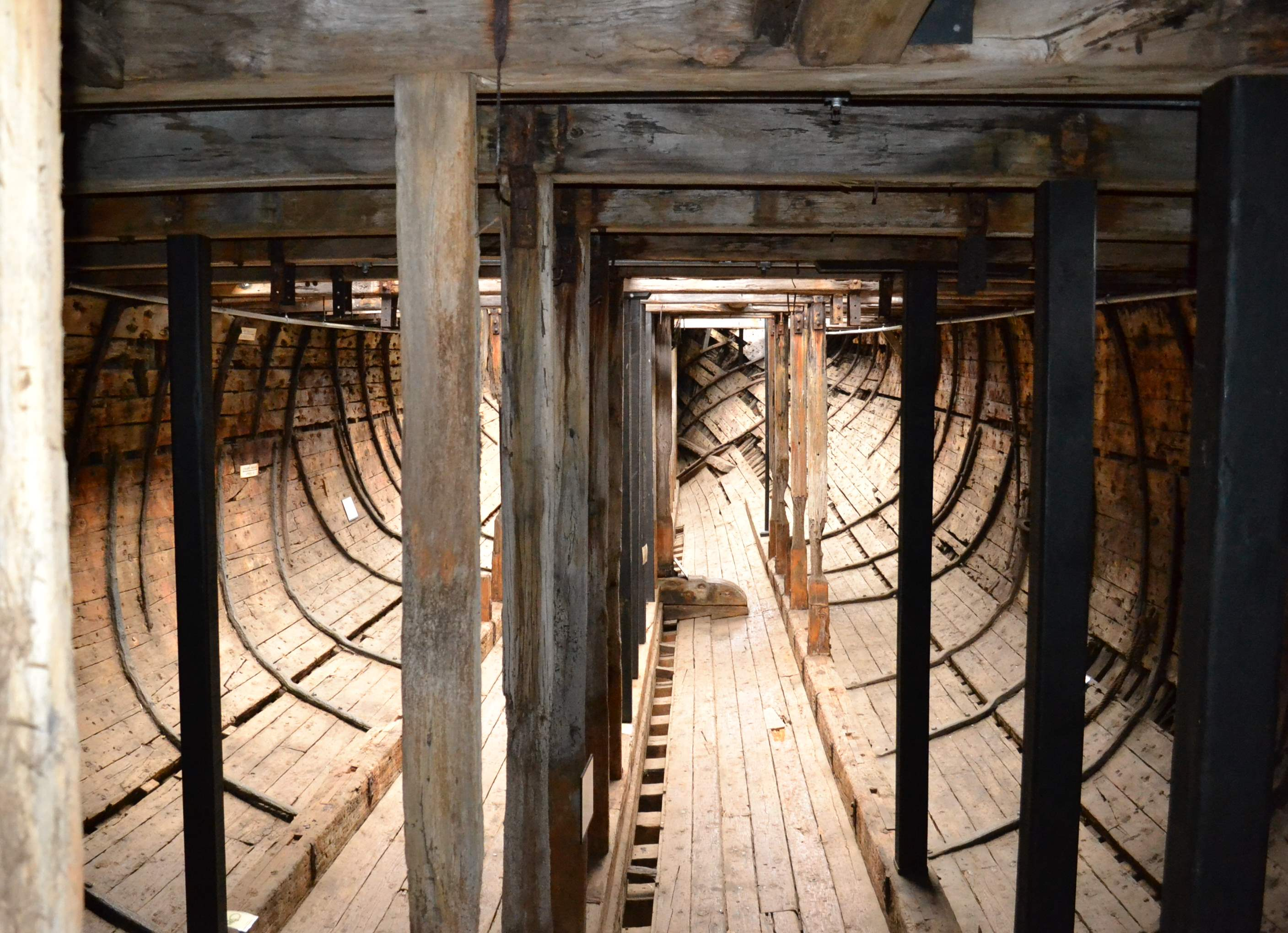
The interior of the Edwin Fox, listed by Heritage New Zealand in 1999

Tester and Burgess were transported on board the Edwin Fox convict ship on 26 August 1858; the destination was the Swan River Colony in Western Australia. Burgess was given a ticket of leave in December 1859 and a conditional pardon in March 1862. (Note: A "ticket of leave" was given to convicts for good behaviour. It allowed them to live independently of the prison system and take employment, but only within a limited geographical area. Their behaviour was still scrutinised and the ticket could be withdrawn if the conditions were infringed. A "conditional pardon" gave freedom to a convict, but not the permission to return to the UK.) Tester received his ticket of leave in July 1859 and a conditional pardon in October 1861. He left Australia in 1863. Agar remained in England for a little longer; he is known to have been held in Portland Prison in February 1857, before being transported to Australia on 23 September 1857. He was given his ticket of leave in September 1860, and a conditional pardon in September 1867. He left Australia to travel to Colombo, in British Ceylon, in 1869.

An account of the trial was published in 1857, with illustrations by Percy Cruikshank, the eldest son of the caricaturist Isaac Robert Cruikshank. The history of the robbery can be found in The First Great Train Robbery, written by David C. Hanrahan in 2011. In the May 1955 issue of The Railway Magazine the railway historian Michael Robbins wrote an article on the robbery; in November 1980 the Journal of the Railway and Canal Historical Society carried an account written by the historian John Fletcher.

On 25 December 1960 the television anthology series Armchair Theatre dramatised the crime under the title The Great Gold Bullion Robbery. Adapted by Malcolm Hulke and Eric Paice from a play by the lawyer Gerald Sparrow, and directed by John Llewellyn Moxey, it starred Colin Blakely as Pierce, James Booth as Agar, Henry McGee as Tester and Leslie Weston as Burgess.

The writer and director Michael Crichton produced his novel The Great Train Robbery in 1975; his introduction reads "The Great Train Robbery was not only shocking and appalling, but also 'daring', 'audacious' and 'masterful'." A feature film based on the novel, The First Great Train Robbery (1978), presents a highly fictionalised version of the event, portraying Pierce (played by Sean Connery), as a gentleman master criminal who eventually escapes from the police. The robbery also featured as one of the themes in the 2006 mystery novel Kept by D. J. Taylor.

== See also ==
- List of heists in the United Kingdom
- Train robbery

== Notes and references ==
=== Sources ===
==== Books ====
- "The Great Banking Forgeries". The Bankers' Magazine, and Journal of the Money Market. XVII. London: Richard Groombridge. 1857.
- Bradley Hirst, John (2008). Freedom on the Fatal Shore: Australia's First Colony. Melbourne, Victoria: Black Inc. ISBN 978-1-86395-207-1.
- Crichton, Michael (1995). The Great Train Robbery. London: Arrow. ISBN 978-0-0994-8241-3.
- Cruikshank, Percy (1856). A Full Report of the Great Gold Robbery. London: H. Vickers. OCLC 86086166. (subscription required)
- Evans, D. Mourier (1859). Facts, Failures and Frauds: Revelations, Financial, Mercantile, Criminal. London: Groombridge & Sons. OCLC 898881745.
- Griffiths, Arthur (1899). Mysteries of Police and Crime. Vol. I. London: Cassell & Co. OCLC 847151446.
- Hanrahan, David (2011). The First Great Train Robbery. London: Robert Hale. ISBN 978-0-7090-9040-3.
- Linnane, Fergus (2004). London's Underworld: Three Centuries of Vice and Crime. London: Robson. ISBN 978-1-8610-5742-6.
- Shore, Heather (2015). London's Criminal Underworlds, c. 1720 – c. 1930: A Social and Cultural History. Basingstoke, Hampshire: Palgrave Macmillan UK. ISBN 978-1-137-31391-1.
- Storey, Neil (2007). London: Crime, Death and Debauchery. Stroud, Gloucestershire: Sutton Publishing. ISBN 978-0-7509-4624-7.
- Thomas, Donald (1998). The Victorian Underworld. New York: New York University Press. ISBN 978-0-8147-8238-5.

==== Journals and magazines ====
- Cordery, Simon (2013). "The First Great Train Robbery, by David C. Hanrahan". Railroad History (208): 106–107. JSTOR 43524697.
- Fletcher, John (November 1980). "The First Great Train Robbery". Journal of the Railway and Canal Historical Society. XXVI (3): 77–81. ISSN 0033-8834.
- Matlock, Daniel (26 March 2018). "Dr. Smiles and the 'Counterfeit' Gentlemen: Self-Making and Misapplication in Mid-Nineteenth-Century Britain". Victorian Literature and Culture. 46 (1): 83–94. doi:10.1017/S106015031700033X.
- Robbins, Michael (May 1955). "The Great South-Eastern Bullion Robbery". The Railway Magazine. 101 (649): 315–317.

==== News sources ====
- "The Bullion Robbery". London Evening Standard. 22 May 1855. p. 1.
- "The Bullion Robbery". The Times. 18 November 1856. p. 11.
- "The Bullion Robbery". The Times. 11 December 1856. p. 8.
- "The Bullion Robbery". The Times. 25 December 1856. p. 9.
- "The Bullion Robbery on the South-Eastern Railway". The Times. 14 January 1857. pp. 7–8.
- Andrews, Peter (22 June 1975). "The Great Train Robbery". The New York Times. p. 236.
- Hill, Susan (11 February 2006). "Review: Kept: A Victorian Mystery by DJ Taylor". The Guardian.
- "Police". The Times. 8 September 1855. p. 9.
- Richman, Darren (6 December 2015). "No 45: The First Great Train Robbery; Take Two: Movies Not to be Missed". The Independent. p. 10.
- "Three Hundred Pounds Reward". The Morning Chronicle. 21 May 1855. p. 1.
- "Three Hundred Pounds Reward". The Morning Post. 21 May 1855. p. 1.
- "Three Hundred Pounds Reward". The Shipping and Mercantile Gazette. 21 May 1855. p. 5.
- "Three Hundred Pounds Reward". The Times. 22 May 1855. p. 8.

==== Websites ====
- Clark, Gregory (2020). "The Annual RPI and Average Earnings for Britain, 1209 to Present (New Series)". MeasuringWorth.
- "Convicts and the British colonies in Australia". Australian Government. Archived from the original on 1 January 2016.
- "Edward Agar". Old Bailey Proceedings Online. October 1855.
- "Edwin Fox Hull and Anchor Windlass". Heritage New Zealand.
- "The Great Gold Robbery, 1855". British Transport Police. Archived from the original on 25 June 2020.
- "The Great Gold Bullion Robbery (1960)". British Film Institute. Archived from the original on 17 May 2022.
