= Frederick George Beale =

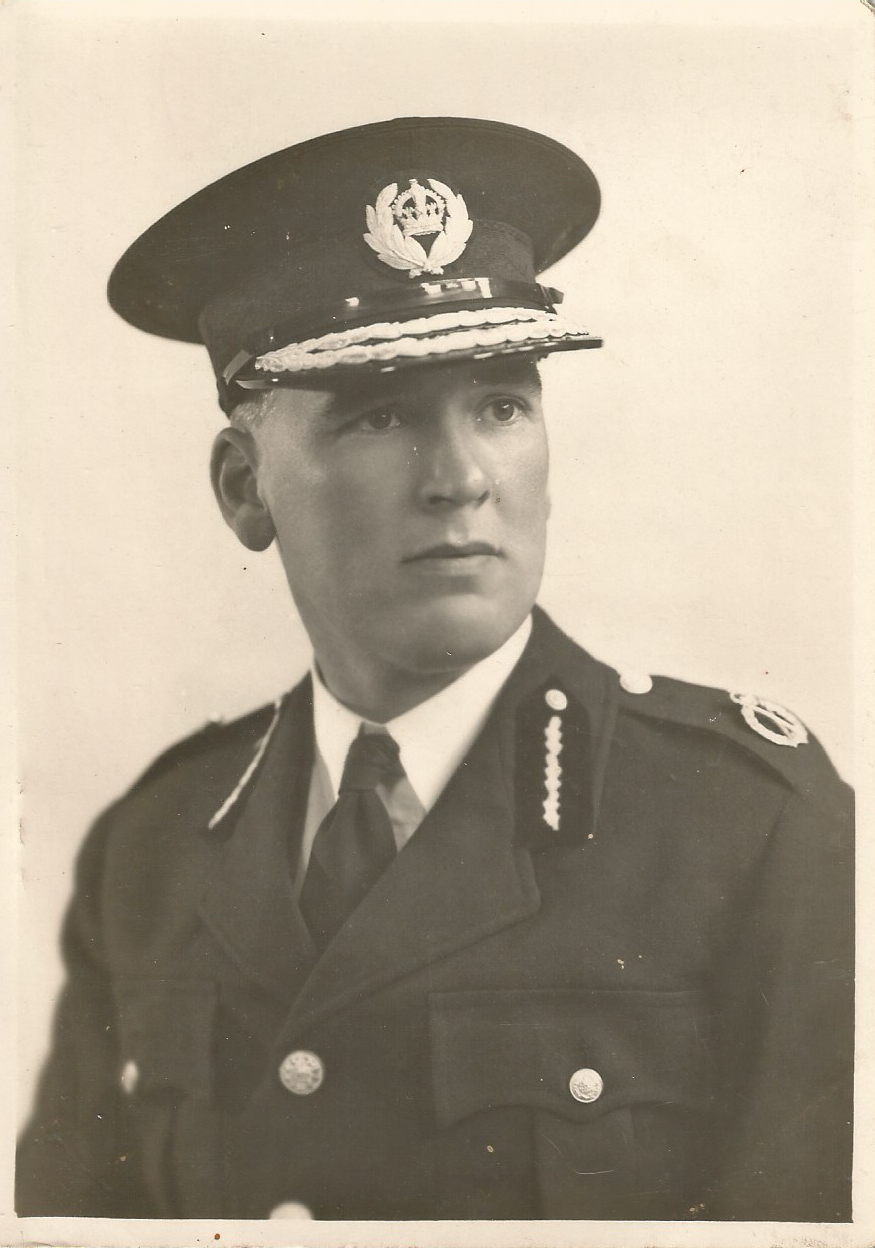
Frederick George Beale

Frederick George Beale (16 November 1906 – 22 January 1986) was a British police officer and Chief Constable.

== Early life ==
Beale was born in Crosskeys, Monmouthshire, Wales in 1906, the son of Frederick Charles Beale, a coal miner, and Edith Terrell. He was schooled at West Monmouth Grammar School until aged 17, and later studied at the South Wales School of Mines until aged 22. He received three awards for distinction and a diploma in mining engineering, later becoming an Associate of the South Wales Institute of Engineers.

== Police career ==
=== Brighton Borough Police ===
Beale joined the Brighton Borough Police in 1929 and performed commendable duties across multiple departments, eventually transferring to police headquarters in 1932, first as Aliens Officer and later in the same year a clerk to the chief officer, whilst still a Police Constable. In March 1933 he passed the qualifying examinations to earn the promotion of Sergeant, scoring a top score of 91% and a transfer to the St Helens Police.

=== St. Helens County Borough Police ===
From 1933 to 1935, Beale was a staff officer to the Chief Constable of St Helens Police, and performed clerical duties and taking of charges. In 1934 he took an examination with the City of Liverpool Police and qualified for the rank of Inspector.

=== King's Lynn Borough Police ===
On 2 May 1935 he transferred to the King's Lynn Borough Police in Norfolk and became the deputy to the Chief Constable of the force, which consisted of 43 regulars and 120 members of the Special Constabulary. He also performed the duties required of him as an Inspector of Weights & Measures. In July 1938 he undertook a course in Air Raid Precautions at the Home Office School at Falfield, and in July 1939 he took a course in incendiary bomb control at the Home Office School in Nottingham. In August 1940 he took a course of instruction for operational control in air raid incidents, and was subsequently a qualified instructor in Air Raid Precautions. Amongst other qualifications, Beale was certified by the St John Ambulance Association and the Royal Life Saving Society.

=== Penzance Borough Police ===
In October 1941, the Chief Constable of Penzance Borough Police, Robert Cyril Morton Jenkins, resigned to take a post at the Folkestone Borough Police. Six candidates were reviewed by the Penzance Police Watch Committee, those being Inspector Beale, Inspector Butcher of Ramsgate, Inspector Cargill of Liverpool, Inspectors Yeoman and Hargreaves of Blackpool and Inspector Maxwell of Preston. Candidates were balloted, with numbers whittled down to three, with Beale getting the highest number of votes during the second round of balloting.

Beale led the force throughout the final years of the Second World War, although would be required to defer the running of the force to Cornwall Constabulary in 1943, as per the terms of the Defence (Amalgamation of Police) Act 1942, which was a temporary measure by the Home Office to allow the military to deal more easily with a smaller number of police forces. By 1946 though, the arrangement was still in effect, and on 1 April 1947 borough forces were abolished altogether with the passing of the 1946 Police Act.

=== Cornwall County Constabulary ===
Beale remained in charge of the Penzance district of the Cornwall County Constabulary, taking the rank of Superintendent.

Beale died in Sussex in 1986.
