= HMS Lynx =

Ten Royal Navy ships have been named HMS Lynx after the wild cat:

- HMS Lynx (1761) was a 10-gun sloop launched in 1761 and sold in 1777.
- HMS Lynx (1777) was a 16-gun sloop launched in 1777. Converted to a hospital ship in 1780, the ship was sold in 1783.
- HMS Lynx (1794) was a 16-gun sloop launched in 1794 and sold in 1813.
- Lynx was to have been an 18-gun Cruizer-class brig-sloop. Originally ordered in 1812 as HMS Pandora she was renamed Lynx. However construction was canceled in 1818.
- HMS Lynx (1833) was a Cherokee-class brig-sloop launched in 1833 and broken up in 1845.
- HMS Lynx (1854) was an Arrow-class wooden screw gunvessel launched in 1854 and sold in 1862.
- HMS Lynx (1868) was a Beacon-class gunboat launched in 1868 and sold in 1888.
- HMS Lynx (1894) was a Ferret-class destroyer launched in 1894 and sold in 1912.
- HMS Lynx (1913) was an Acasta-class destroyer launched in 1913 and sunk by a mine in the Moray Firth in 1915.
- HMS Lynx (F27) was a Type 41 (or Leopard-class) frigate launched in 1955, sold to Bangladesh in 1982 and renamed Abu Bakr.
- HMS Lynx (shore establishment) was also a shore establishment at Dover commissioned in 1939 and paid off in 1946.
