= Harry Kenyon (police officer) =

British police officer

Chief Constable Harry Kenyon

Harry Kenyon (1871–1955) was a British police officer and Chief Constable, and served in the Oldham, Burnley and Penzance Borough Police forces from 1893 to 1937.

== Early life and family ==
Harry Kenyon was born in 1871, in Ashton-Under-Lyne, Lancashire, England, to John Alfred Kenyon, a cotton drawer-in, and Emma Jones. As a young man Kenyon followed in his father's footsteps and worked as a drawer-in at a cotton mill, organising the pattern of threads under the supervision of a "reacher" in the reaching room.

In 1903 he married Margaret Ann Barker in Burnley, Lancashire, and with her had two children, Bernard and Lionel. They lived together at 18 Tolver Road in Penzance, Cornwall.

== Police career ==
=== Oldham Borough Constabulary ===
Kenyon began his police career in November 1893, joining the Oldham Borough Constabulary as a Third-Class Constable. He was noted for showing tact and vigilance early on in his career, with the arrest of a large number of prolific offenders. He was a constable for four and a half years before taking a sergeant's exam, and scored the highest marks out of 156 candidates. On becoming a sergeant he was also appointed an inspector of weights and measures, common lodging houses, hackney carriages and explosives. He also regulated business at the Quarter Sessions and annual Brewster Sessions. Kenyon was noted for being an effective organiser of crowd control, demonstrating his skills during elections, trades disputes, strikes and Royal visits. During his career as a sergeant he also passed the Board of Trade exam for full qualification as an Inspector of Weights and Measures.

=== Burnley Borough Police ===
In November 1898, Kenyon applied for the position of Inspector at the Burnley Borough Police. He was successful, and a large number of duties came under his control at his new appointment, including the training of recruits, taking and preparing evidence, and book-keeping. Common with police forces of the era, Kenyon was also held the dual role of Superintendent of the Burnley Fire Brigade. Whilst at Burnley, he traveled to London to undertake a course in fingerprint identification at Scotland Yard.

=== Penzance Borough Police ===
In 1908, Kenyon successfully attained the post of Head Constable of the Penzance Borough Police, succeeding Superintendent Richard Nicholas, who had retired. Kenyon used his previous experience as a director of fire-fighting to good use, no less in 1936 when the village of Newlyn suffered a series of thatched-roof fires. During the First World War he enforced offences under the Defence of the Realm Act 1914, including the prosecution of military men caught drunk when off duty (which was prohibited under the Act) and cases of sailors absent without leave, which would cause vital disruption to military operations on the sea.

On 8 February 1917, Solly Tiskofsky, a Russian-born British soldier, handed himself in at the Penzance police station and notified them he was an absentee. Tiskofsky had absconded from the Army and stowed away on the SS Crown Point, which was subsequently torpedoed. Having landed with the survivors at Penzance, he had nowhere else to go, and so turned himself in. Head Constable Kenyon handed him over to the military authorities.

In the inter-war years, Kenyon inaugurated a period of growth and organisation for the force, with Kenyon becoming a well-respected member in society and a keen socialite. He became known for hosting lavish Charity Balls in the concert hall at St. John’s Hall.

On 29 June 1929, Kenyon was assaulted whilst off duty by Penzance resident Charles Lavers. On the evening of the 29th, Kenyon was playing bowls with some friends when he was approached on the bowling green by Lavers, who shouted he (Kenyon) was wanted by "the Queen's Shades." Kenyon told Lavers to go away and said he would speak to him after the game had finished, but Lavers set upon Kenyon quite violently, with both men struggling to the ground. Bystanders came to the assistance of the Head Constable and assisted him in binding Lavers' hands and feet with rope. Such was his struggling that they kept him bound and conveyed him to the police station in a wheelbarrow. Lavers was charged in court with assault and sentenced to two months imprisonment.

From May to September 1934, Kenyon noticed amounts of money disappearing from a drawer in his office. The money was stored in the drawer and logged in a book whenever a member of the public handed in found cash to the police station, and had been disappearing ten shillings at a time. Kenyon noticed that the cash had been signed out by one of his officers, a Police Constable Henry Palmer, with the name and address of the owner of the money entered into the book. Kenyon queried the log book entries and discovered that false owner details had been entered.

Mr Palmer was questioned as to these discrepancies and admitted he had taken the money, and entered false details into the book, including the forging of signatures. He was dismissed from his job, and charged with five counts of larceny in court. Based on Palmer's honesty in admitting the crime, and the hardship he had suffered since losing his job, Kenyon pleaded for leniency and suggested he be spared prison and fined instead. The jury imposed a £30 fine on Mr Palmer and he was released on bail, with a seven-day deadline for paying the fine, or he would be sent to prison.

On 14 December 1934, Kenyon's men seized fifty cars in the district as the result of a round-up of a gang of car thieves who were operating from London.

== Later career & death ==
Kenyon retired on 31 December 1936, and was succeeded by Robert Cyril Morton Jenkins, former Inspector of the Canterbury City Police. Kenyon remained deeply involved with the police in his retirement, acting as a mentor to the new Chief Constable when there was cause to attend the scene of a fire. He also continued in his role as Inspector of Weights and Measures. In December 1937, Kenyon encouraged Chief Constable Jenkins to host a charity ball at St John's Hall, the headquarters of the Penzance Borough Police. Whilst Jenkins and his wife Ethel acted as hosts, Kenyon chaired a popular whist drive with prizes handed out by Mrs Jenkins.

Kenyon died in 1955, aged 83.
