= Newlyn riots =

1896 riots in Cornwall

The Newlyn riots occurred in Newlyn, Cornwall, UK in May 1896. Cornish fishermen did not believe in landing fish on a Sunday, so other fleets exploited their opportunity. Locals retaliated by seizing non-Cornish vessels and throwing their catch overboard. This led to three days of rioting, quelled only by the intervention of a naval destroyer.

== Background ==
In the late 19th century the fishing port of Newlyn was home to one of the UK's largest fishing fleets, and was also the regular landing port for many other fishing vessels operating off the Cornish coast. At the time Newlyn was also the home to as many as five Methodist and Non-Conformist religious groups, whose congregations included the local fishermen, most of whom practised a ban on fish being landed on the Sabbath. The non-Cornish fishing crews, largely from Lowestoft and northern English ports, did not hold the same opinions about Sabbath observation, and would frequently land fish on a Sunday attracting higher prices for their fish than those sold on a weekday.

== Early clashes ==
The riots began in the early morning of Monday 18 May when a group of up to 40 Newlyn fishermen, supported by a mob of around 1,000 others, boarded the boats of "East" (of Cornwall) fishermen moored in Newlyn Harbour and destroyed their catches. By mid-morning some 16 boats had been seized and approximately 100,000 mackerel thrown overboard. By midday messages were sent to the fishing communities of St Ives, Mousehole and Porthleven for help in intercepting the further 100 non-Cornish fishing vessels still at sea in the area.

== Police mobilisation ==
Within minutes of the riot's beginning, a message was sent to the county police station at Chyandour in Penzance asking for assistance, and by mid-morning a large number of police had assembled from all parts of west Cornwall. Since an estimated 100 Lowestoft vessels were still at sea a small steamer was dispatched, containing the Newlyn harbour master, to advise them of the situation; the steamer was duly chased by a local trawler. By late afternoon the Porthleven fleet arrived in support of the Newlyn men.

== Rioting ==
The next day the police and local fisherman exchanged in a number of violent encounters around Newlyn Harbour. The only recorded injury was to local Police Inspector Matthews, who was knocked on the head by a fish box. As the rioting continued seven "Yorkie" vessels were sighted making for Penzance harbour to land their catches there. Around 300 of the rioters then made for that harbour and were met by a detachment of the Penzance Borough Police, supported by a group of local Penzance youths. The strong resistance met on arrival in Penzance forced the rioters to return to Newlyn.

== Military arrival ==
By mid-afternoon the situation had become so serious that the local authorities asked for military assistance. At 6:00 pm 400 soldiers from the Royal Berkshire Regiment under Major Massard arrived by train at Penzance railway station and made for temporary barracks in Penzance to await orders.

== Rioting spreads ==
Around 8:00 pm a considerable riot broke out between the Newlyn, Porthleven and St Ives men, and the men of Penzance supported by the men of Lowestoft, who had by this time managed to land their catches. Around 100 police of both the Penzance and Cornwall forces attempted to intervene but were beaten back, this leading the police to summon the assistance of the military recently stationed in Penzance. The soldiers immediately made for Newlyn, again joined by several hundred Penzance men, and, upon crossing Newlyn bridge, were met with stone throwing. The soldiers then made for the Harbour and occupied the piers. While this was occurring the torpedo boat destroyer HMS Ferret entered the harbour. The arrival of the military calmed the rioters, and by midnight that day they had largely dispersed.
