= Penzance Borough Police =

Former police force for Penzance, Cornwall

Agency overview
- Formed: 1836
- Dissolved: 1947
- Superseding agency: Cornwall County Constabulary

Jurisdictional structure
- Operations jurisdiction: England, UK
- Legal jurisdiction: England & Wales
- Governing body: Police Watch Committee
- Constituting instrument: Municipal Corporations Act 1835
- General nature: Civilian police

Operational structure
- Overseen by: Her Majesty's Inspectorate of Constabulary
- Headquarters: St. John's Hall, Alverton Street, Penzance (1868–1947)
- Agency executive: Frederick G. Beale (1947 at dissolution), Chief Constable

Facilities
- Stations: 1

Penzance Borough Police was the police force for the borough and corporate town of Penzance, Cornwall, from 1836 to 1947. It was formed following the passing of the Municipal Corporations Act 1835, which reformed all UK boroughs, and stipulated that each appoint a Watch Committee to oversee a police force. The police force formed part of the commonality of the town's government, led by an elected Mayor, six aldermen and eighteen councillors.

== Pre-formation ==
Prior to 1835, law and order in Penzance was enforced by a Parish Constable appointed by a Justice of the Peace, under supervision of the Lord Lieutenant, a tradition begun in the 13th century during the reign of Edward I. Parish Constables were part-time and unpaid. Justices of the Peace were also unpaid members of the local gentry deemed to be "good and lawful," and were able to hold courts of Petty Sessions to deal with minor misdemeanours. In Penzance, Petty Sessions were held on the second and fourth Monday in the month at 11am, first at Penzance Grammar School and later at the newly constructed Guildhall. The first Petty Sessions of the new borough took place on Monday 18 July 1836. Serious matters of theft, criminal damage, trespass and infringement were dealt with by the Justice at Quarter Sessions, held four times a year. Petty and Quarter Sessions were retained following the formation of the Borough Police. The title of Parish Constable was abolished in favour of the title of Head Constable.

== Governance ==
The Penzance Borough Police was governed by a Police Watch Committee, the body itself led by a town councillor responsible for appointing a Head Constable who held the rank of Superintendent. Watch Committees granted strong autonomy for police forces, resulting in regional variations in organisation and decision-making. The offices of the force were housed within St John's Hall, built in 1867–68, on Alverton Street, which also contained the Police Court. In 1895 a County police station was erected at Chyandour. There were also County stations in Nancherrow and Charles Hill, containing a sergeant and one constable, in St. Just. The County stations formed part of the larger Cornwall County Constabulary, and were not directly related to the borough. The force was led by a Head Constable from its inception, a term that fell out of use in the early twentieth century in favour of the title (and rank) of Chief Constable.

In 1937 plans were made by the Borough Council to relocate the police to a proposed new building on the site of the Penalverne car park. The matter of relocating the police was raised to "reclaim" St John's Hall as a fully "public" building, which the police occupied at the time along with the courts and council chambers, albeit in the basement level. In light of the cost of the new build, and the outbreak of World War 2, these plans were dropped and St John's Hall remained the headquarters of the Penzance Borough Police until 1947.

In 1927 the force's gross expenditure was recorded as approximately £5,454 with a government subsidy provided to the force of £2,542.

== Early activities ==
The first chief officer is recorded as Head Constable Pascoe, and early newspaper excerpts from the West Briton newspaper indicate that police were normally committed with dealing with thieves, robbers and vagrants, with one recorded instance of a Spanish soldier apprehended for vagrancy in the first week of October 1836. Punishment in the early nineteenth century normally involved imprisonment, fines, public humiliation and hard labour, and for this vagrant it would be eight hours on the "treadwheel" at Penzance Prison. Penzance, like many other towns of the era, had problems of infanticide amongst its poorer residents, with many recorded examples of parents murdering their newborns through stress, diminished responsibility and criminal intentions. The police were not always able to prove murder in many cases however, as it was often difficult to prove whether the infant, when discovered deceased, was born alive in the first place. So rife was infanticide that where a death was accidental, some parents were wrongfully arrested and tried for murder. An example can be evidenced from a report in the West Briton newspaper on 9 August 1839, when police arrested work-house employee Charlotte Galloway for the murder of her three-week-old child. Despite testimony that she was seen to neglect the child, murder charges were not brought as the coroner could not determine whether the child's death by suffocation was accidental, even though evidence was found that the mother had tried to dispose of the body.

=== Newlyn riots ===
On 18 May 1896 a major civil disturbance occurred in Newlyn, which was at the time a major fishing port. Newlyn was home to a large number of Methodist and Non-Conformist religious groups, some of whom practised a ban on fishing on the day of the Sabbath. Non-Cornish fisherman, largely from Lowestoft and other English ports, did not hold the same opinions about observing the Sabbath, and so continued to fish on a Sunday, which would attract higher prices for their fish than sold on a weekday. On the morning of the 18th, a group of 40 fishermen bolstered by a mob of roughly a thousand supporters, boarded a number of non-Cornish fishing boats moored in the harbour and destroyed their catches. Police were alerted and arrived on the scene within a few hours, although they numbered only eight, supported by Cornwall County officers Superintendent Richard Nicholas and Inspector Matthews. Out at sea, over 100 Lowestoft vessels were approached by a small steamer piloted by the Newlyn harbour master, warning them of the situation. The harbour master himself was pursued by a local trawler, and by late afternoon a fleet of vessels from Porthleven had arrived in support of the mob. The following morning, police clashed with rioters around Newlyn Harbour, with Inspector Matthews severely injured by a fish box which was thrown at him, cutting his head and breaking his finger. During the chaos, seven "Yorkie" vessels were spotted making for Penzance to land their catches, and over 300 rioters made for Penzance harbour. Police intercepted the group at Penzance, and, backed by a large number of local youths, managed to deter them from attack. By mid afternoon the situation was out of control, and the police called in the military. At 6pm 400 soldiers from the Royal Berkshire Regiment under Major Massard arrived by train at Penzance and took temporary billets in the town, remaining on standby until the police required them. Two hours later, a large riot broke out between Newlyn, Porthleven and St Ives fishermen. Police were beaten back when they tried to intervene, giving them cause to call upon the assistance of the army who had arrived earlier. The police and army joined and were met with stone-throwing as they crossed the Newlyn Bridge, but were able to occupy the piers long enough to see in the arrival of HMS Ferret. The presence of the military on land and sea was enough to calm the rioters, and by midnight the disturbance was over.

== Presentation ==
Uniform bore the insignia of the head of St. John the Baptist, located on the helmet plate, belt buckle and buttons. In 1938 the helmet plate was changed to the Penzance Borough crest, one of many forces to do so in an attempt to adopt and reflect unique coats of arms. These were later replaced by the standard royal cipher, a step seen as detrimental to individual identity by serving officers. During the Second World War, those employed as War Reserves wore the letters WR on their collars, and routinely carried gas masks in a carryall. Members of the Special Constabulary wore striped arm bands along with the standard uniform.

== Strength ==
The early strength of the Penzance Borough Police was very small, with only two officers and two gaolers in 1856. In 1882 there were eleven men and records from 1883 to 1893 suggest the force rarely numbered more than thirteen men until the First World War when numbers were boosted by Special Constables. In 1927 there were approximately 40 members of the Penzance Special Constabulary, and no women constables. A report by the Inspector of Constabulary noted, in that year, there was one Police Constable for every 775 persons of a population of 12,087 In 1883 the force consisted of two sergeants and eight constables led by Head Constable John Olds. In 1893 the force numbered two sergeants and ten constables led by Head Constable Richard Nicholas. During the Newlyn Riots of 1896 the force numbered only eight. The 1911 Census records Head Constable Harry Kenyon, two sergeants, and twelve constables. In 1914 there were two sergeants and thirteen constables. A photograph taken in 1936 shows a strength of twenty, and by 1939 twenty-five. The force would boast its highest number of recruits during World War II, when its regulars were supported by Special Constables and a large number of specially employed War Reserves. The addition of a criminal investigations department and a motor patrol between 1937 and 1941 by Chief Constable Robert Cyril Morton Jenkins boosted numbers further, although exact numbers are unknown. The historic reference to Inspectors and Superintendents in Penzance, relate to officers of the Cornwall County Constabulary covering the Penzance District, which in 1893 were Superintendent John Coombe, based in Camborne, and Inspector Edward Matthews, based in Chyandour.

The Penzance Special Constabulary grew in number considerably during the Second World War, and when war was declared the swift actions of the Chief Constable and a Sergeant Hancock ensured that every member had reported for duty within five hours. In 1941 Chief Constable Jenkins paid tribute to the Special Constabulary, and he in turn was presented with the gift on an inscribed silver plate and the promise of a group photograph. Many members of the Penzance Special Constabulary would go on to serve as regulars in the force.

== Chief constables ==
The first Head Constable of the force was Mr Pascoe in 1836, who was succeeded by John Martins. Sergeant John Olds was made Joint Head Constable along with Sergeant William Wallis, an unusual arrangement for a borough force. When Mr Martins decreased his duties owing to age, John Olds became the sole Head Constable from 1853 until 1886, with William Wallis becoming Olds' deputy. Olds was succeeded by Richard Nicholas, who held the post for 42 years until his retirement in 1908. Burnley Borough Police Inspector Harry Kenyon took over from 1908 and served until 1937, when he was succeeded by RCM Jenkins. Jenkins had a short tenure and departed for Folkestone in 1941, with Frederick George Beale taking over until the force was abolished in 1943.

Messrs Olds, Nicholas and Kenyon had the dual role of Inspectors of Weights and Measures, an arrangement which ended when RCM Jenkins was sworn in. Kenyon continued on as Inspector of Weights & Measures into his retirement, although with the swearing in of Frederick Beale, the role defaulted back to the incumbent Chief Constable. Historically the term Head Constable referred to the officer's role, not his rank, and from 1836 to 1937 the chief officer was invariably referred to as both the Head Constable and Superintendent. RCM Jenkins was the first chief officer of the force to hold the rank of Chief Constable.

== First World War ==
Three officers of the Penzance Borough force are listed as resigning their posts and going to war, and all of them returned.

Chief Constable Kenyon regularly prosecuted offenders under the Defence of the Realm Act 1914. In July 1915 the police court saw numerous cases of military men drunk whilst off duty (which was prohibited under the Act) and sailors absent without leave. Naval trawlers would not leave port without their full crew complement, which would cause considerable delay and disruption to military movements.

On 8 February 1917 Solly Tiskofsky, a Russian-born British soldier, handed himself in at the Penzance police station and notified them he was an absentee. Tiskofsky had absconded from the Army and stowed away on the SS Crown Point, which was subsequently torpedoed. Having landed with the survivors at Penzance, he had nowhere else to go, and so turned himself in. Chief Constable Kenyon handed him over to the military authorities.

== Interwar years ==
The interwar years were ones of growth and organisation for the force, with the incumbent Chief Constable Harry Kenyon becoming a well-respected member in society and a keen socialite. Kenyon became known for hosting lavish Charity Balls in the concert hall at St. John's Hall, a tradition continued by his successor R.C.M. Jenkins.

On 14 December 1934 police seized fifty cars in the district as the result of a round-up of a gang of car thieves who were operating from London.

== Second World War ==
During the Second World War, Chief Constable Jenkins was responsible for building up the force's War Reserves and Special Constabulary, as well overseeing the growth of the Auxiliary Fire Service and the ARP. The Home Guard also had a strong presence in Penzance, although frequently found themselves at odds with the police and the ARP, with many of them failing to take their responsibilities seriously.

On Sunday 17 March 1940, RCM Jenkins led a large-scale practice run for the Penzance ARP. Numbering over 260 volunteers, the drill was overseen by the ARP County Controller, Major G.H. Johnstone, and Chief Warden Mr F.S Shaw. In an operation that was hailed as a rousing success, Jenkins supervised twenty incidents, including a mock rescue operation at a ruined building on Coinagehall Street, an oil fire at Taylor's Garage and various demolition and decontamination exercises at sundry points.

Equipment involved included two fire engines, eight AFS pumps, four ambulances, five cars for treating casualties, a mobile first-aid post and three mobile water vans. ARP personnel engaged included twenty umpires, twenty control room operators, over one hundred members of the Auxiliary Fire Service, seventy “casualties,” ten decontaminators, ten paramedics, ten demolition workers, twenty messengers and a large number of police officers, Boy Scouts and Air Cadets.

Penzance town was bombed by Nazi Germany's Luftwaffe between 1940 and 1942, with a total of 867 bombs dropped, killing 16 persons (including a police sergeant) and injuring 115 others; 48 houses were completely destroyed, 157 seriously damaged, and 3,752 damaged. Total 3,957.

== Abolition ==
Penzance Borough was absorbed into the Cornwall Constabulary on 1 April 1943 as part of a temporary countrywide measure to reduce the number of police forces the military had to deal with during the war. The decision to merge, even temporarily, was unpopular and in 1942 the Mayor of Penzance, Alderman C.E. Harvey, travelled to London to speak to the Home Secretary Herbert Morrison in person about the issue, and made recommendations against it. The amalgamation with Cornwall Constabulary created the "Penzance Division," with Chief Constable Beale appointed Superintendent. By 1947, the government passed the 1946 Police Act which abolished borough police forces altogether. Further reform in 1967 saw the Cornwall Constabulary merge with the Devon & Exeter and Plymouth City forces to become the Devon & Cornwall Constabulary.

== Legacy ==
No public tributes are known to exist, a common theme with borough forces which in the 21st Century are largely forgotten. Historian and former Devon & Cornwall police officer Simon Dell has written a number of books on policing in Cornwall.

In the will of former Chief Constable Jenkins [d. 1973] it was requested that a painting of Jenkins by the artist Stanhope Forbes be donated to Devon & Cornwall Constabulary as a tribute to Penzance Borough Police.

Penzance Borough Police was one of the more successful borough forces, compared to others in the region which had been severely criticized for inefficiency, insubordination and corruption. Neighbouring St Ives Borough Police was deemed, following an inspection by Her Majesty's Inspectorate of Constabulary, to be "too small an inefficient to be worthy of keeping." On 10 November 1941, Mr F.S. Shaw, then Chairman of the Police Watch Committee, addressed the Town Council and declared "there was no force in the country working greater efficiency than the Penzance Borough Force."
