= HMS Ferret (1893) =

Ferret-class destroyer

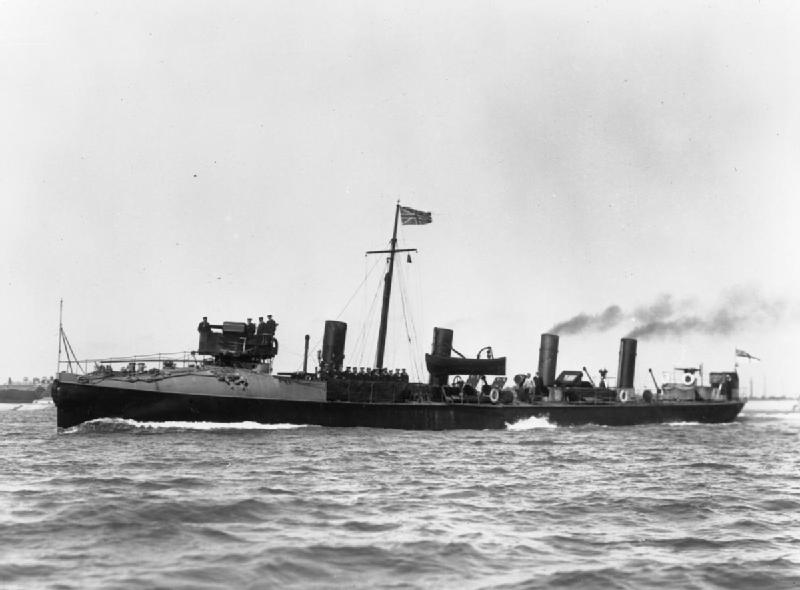
- HMS Ferret

History

United Kingdom
- Name: HMS Ferret
- Builder: Laird, Son & Co., Birkenhead
- Laid down: July 1893
- Launched: 9 December 1893
- Completed: March 1895
- Fate: Sunk as target, 1911

General characteristics
- Class & type: Ferret-class destroyer
- Displacement: 280 long tons (284 t)
- Length: 199 ft (60.7 m)
- Beam: 19.25 ft (5.9 m)
- Draught: 9 ft (2.7 m)
- Propulsion: Vertical triple-expansion steam engines; Coal-fired Normand boilers; 4,475 hp (3,337 kW)
- Speed: 27 knots (50 km/h; 31 mph)
- Complement: 42 (later 53)
- Armament: 1 × QF 12-pounder gun; 2 × 18 inch (450 mm) torpedo tubes

HMS Ferret was a Ferret-class destroyer which served with the Royal Navy from 1893 and was sunk in 1911.

== Construction ==
Ferret was armed with one 12-pounder and three 6-pounder guns, and three torpedo tubes (two on deck mounts and one fixed bow tube). The bow tube was soon removed, and provision was made for removing the deck tubes and substituting two extra 6-pounder guns. She carried a complement of 42 (later raised to 53). Later in her career she was fitted out for boom breaking as an experiment. Her forebridge, gun and bow tube were removed and the turtle backed forecastle was strengthened for this purpose.

== Service history ==
Ferret was launched on 9 December 1893 and completed in 1895.

She served in the Devonport instructional flotilla, when in early February 1900 she was transferred to become tender to HMS Cambridge, gunnery ship off Plymouth.

She underwent repairs to re-tube her boilers during Spring 1902, following which she was in July that year transferred to succeed HMS Lynx as tender to HMS Defiance, torpedo school ship at Devonport.

She took part in the Coronation Review for King Edward VII on 16 August 1902, with Lieutenant Arthur William Tomlinson temporarily in command from 8 August.

She was sunk as a target in 1911.

== Bibliography ==
- Chesneau, Roger & Kolesnik, Eugene M., eds. (1979). Conway's All The World's Fighting Ships 1860–1905. London: Conway Maritime Press. ISBN 0-85177-133-5.
- Colledge, J. J.; Warlow, Ben (2006) [1969]. Ships of the Royal Navy: The Complete Record of All Fighting Ships of the Royal Navy from the 15th Century to the Present (3rd Rev ed.). London: Chatham Publishing. ISBN 978-1-86176-281-8. OCLC 67375475.
- Friedman, Norman (2009). British Destroyers: From Earliest Days to the Second World War. Barnsley, UK: Seaforth Publishing. ISBN 978-1-84832-049-9.
- Gardiner, Robert & Gray, Randal, eds. (1985). Conway's All The World's Fighting Ships 1906–1921. London: Conway Maritime Press. ISBN 0-85177-245-5.
- Lyon, David (2001) [1996]. The First Destroyers. London: Caxton Editions. ISBN 1-84067-364-8.
- Manning, T. D. (1961). The British Destroyer. Putnam & Co. OCLC 6470051.
- March, Edgar J. (1966). British Destroyers: A History of Development, 1892–1953; Drawn by Admiralty Permission From Official Records & Returns, Ships' Covers & Building Plans. London: Seeley Service. OCLC 164893555.
