= Folkestone Borough Police =

Police force of Folkestone, Kent

- Common name: Folkestone Police

Agency overview
- Formed: 1851
- Dissolved: 1943

Jurisdictional structure
- Operations jurisdiction: ENG
- Legal jurisdiction: Folkestone

Operational structure
- Headquarters: Town Hall, Rendezvous Street, Folkestone
- Agency executives: James Steer, Superintendent (1851–1857); Robert Cyril Morton Jenkins, Chief Constable (1941–1943)
- Parent agency: Merged into Kent County Constabulary (1943)

Folkestone Borough Police was the territorial police force responsible for policing the borough of Folkestone, Kent, England, from 1851 until its merger with the Kent County Constabulary in 1943. The force was established under the provisions of the Municipal Corporations Act 1835 and operated from Folkestone Town Hall for most of its existence.

Folkestone Borough Police was the borough police force for the town of Folkestone in Kent. It was formed in 1851 under the terms of the Municipal Corporations Act 1835.

== Early history ==
The force was formed in 1851 under the command of Superintendent James Steer. They operated out of the basement in the Town Hall. On 9 June 1851 Mr Steer arrested James Johnson, a member of the Teetotal Society of Hastings, for being drunk and disorderly in a public place. On locking him up in a police cell, Steer gave him bread and water, and returned a short time later to check on him to find that he had hung himself. Steer cut him down immediately, but he was declared deceased. In 1857 the Folkestone Police Watch Committee made an application to the London Metropolitan Police for the appointment of a police detective to the ranks. This would be William Martin, who succeeded Steer as chief officer in July 1857. Martin led the force until 1872 when he died after a short illness, and was succeeded by John Moulden Wilshire, another London officer. Wilshire was thought to have been an alcoholic, and died in 1880 aged only 39. His successor was Samuel Rutter, and later, John Taylor from 1883. In 1899 the head of the force was renamed Chief Constable.

== Twentieth century ==
In 1900 Inspector Harry Reeve was appointed Chief Constable. The force's numbers began to grow, forcing their council counterparts at the Town Hall to seek an alternative base of operation. In 1908, Constable Frederick Nash was killed by an upturned horse-drawn carriage which had been in collision with a motor vehicle. Mr Reeve did not see the force's large contingent of Special Constables as useful, and in 1911 pressed the Home Office for additional recruitment of permanent police officers.

=== World War One ===
As a consequence of the war, Folkestone employed its first women constables in 1914 to perform extraneous duties on the Folkestone coast. The decision to employ women officers was not popular with the Police Watch Committee, who thought the move to have been "unnecessary," however the Borough Council supported Mr Reeve's initiative and overturned attempts by the Police Watch Committee to dismiss them. In 1916 Folkestone became overwhelmed by the influx of French and Belgian refugees displaced by the war.

=== Scandal ===
In 1922, Harry Reeve was forced to retire owing to ill health, with reports he had become sick from the "strain caused by war work." He was succeeded by Alfred Beesley, a former Scotland Yard detective. Beesley was hugely unpopular with the Police Watch Committee and his subordinates. He stubbornly refused to wear uniform, whether in the execution of his duty, at court or at official functions, and was incredibly difficult to get on with. In 1941, Beesley was reported to the Police Watch Committee by one of his own Sergeants for a number of transgressions in office. In a written statement, the officer accused Beesley of misusing police-owned vehicles, issuing petrol coupons to unauthorised persons, using police-owned fuel for unofficial purposes and for allowing an Inspector to take a vehicle out of the force area when on leave. Lack of evidence meant that no charges or disciplinary action was taken against Beesley, who became infuriated at the claims and started a personal vendetta against his accuser. Beesley reported the officer for misuse of a police car and for making fraudulent entries in a log book, allegations which were not upheld by the Committee. A short time after, the Sergeant reported Beesley for coming into work drunk, an allegation which was again dismissed because it could not be proven. Beesley dismissed the officer, but the Watch Committee intervened and reinstated him.

In 1935, Police Constable Eric Morgan was, although unknown at the time, committing crimes of theft and burglary whilst on duty. This would not come to be realised until 1942 when Morgan was caught and sentenced to nine months in prison. During the trial, Morgan's wife accused thirteen other Folkestone officers of committing similar crimes. This sent the whole force into disarray, and Beesley was asked to resign. Despite his insubordination, he was allowed to claim his police pension. The Folkestone Town Council showed no restraint in declaring their relief at Beesley's resignation. As a consequence of the accusations, and Beesley's departure, the Watch Committee required a new Chief Constable to lead the force and chair an inquiry. That man would be Robert Cyril Morton Jenkins, who was drafted in from Penzance. Jenkins' investigation was assisted by two officers from Scotland Yard, and at its conclusion five constables made written statements admitting their involvement and were dismissed. These were A.H. Nicholls, D.L. Langford, C.H. Woodgate, T. Osborne and H.J. Crowhurst. A Sergeant denied his involvement but was found unfit to perform his duty and asked to resign. Other accused officers remained in their posts in light of insufficient evidence. The scandal left the force demoralised at a time when it should have been focusing on the war that raged in the skies above the country.

== World War Two ==
Chief Constable Jenkins led the force from 1941 to 1943 and brought his experience of collaborating with the Auxiliary Fire Service and Home Guard with the Penzance Borough Police to his new command. The county of Kent, including Folkestone, was heavily bombed during the war, with ordnance coming in the form of bombs dropped by the Luftwaffe, artillery shells launched by the Germans from across the English Channel and later the V-1 rocket known as the "doodle-bug." In Crete Road West a POW camp was constructed for captured Italian soldiers; however, these soldiers were said to have had relative freedom and often left the camp and interacted with the townsfolk.

At the Town Hall on Rendezvous Street, a "Report & Control Centre" was set up in the basement and was run by the police, fire and air raid precaution services. The room was invariably led by the Chief Constable Mr Jenkins or Police Inspector Butcher.

In 1942 the Ministry of Food made a complaint to the Police Watch Committee that meals at the Folkestone Police canteen were not being properly recorded under rationing rules. The complaint was not upheld.

== Abolition ==
Folkestone Borough Police was merged with the Kent County Constabulary in 1943 under the Defence (Amalgamation of Police Forces) Regulations 1942 (SR&O 1942/1443), as a temporary measure to reduce the number of police forces the military had to deal with. By 1946 though the government had abolished borough forces and Folkestone never regained its autonomy. Chief Constable Jenkins was made Assistant Chief Constable of Kent County Constabulary.
