= Shot Tower, Lambeth =

Former shot tower in Lambeth, London, England

Coordinates: 51°30′24″N 0°7′0″W

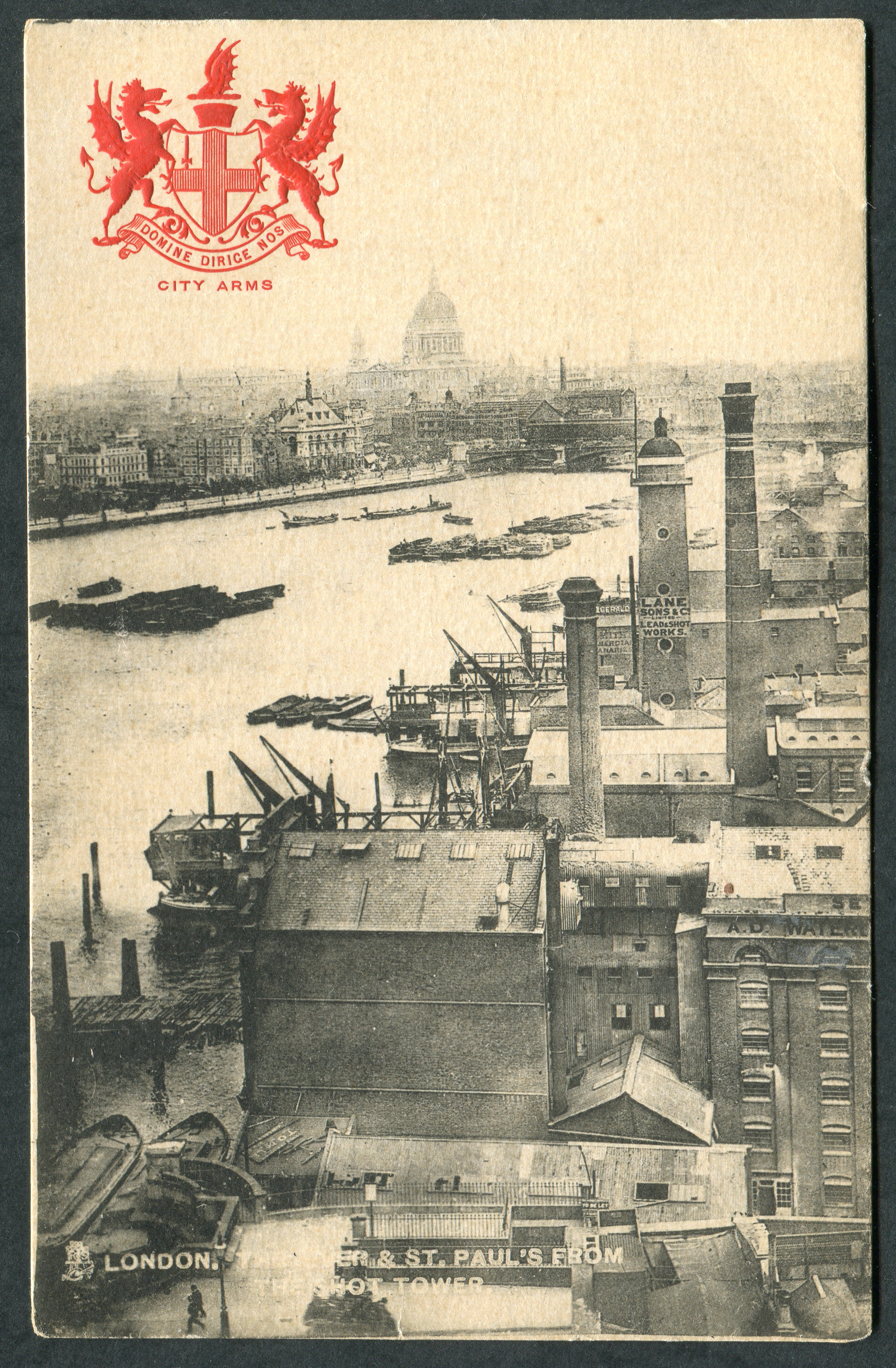
View from the Shot Tower to the Square Shot Tower and St. Paul's Cathedral; Raphael Tuck & Sons postcard, Series 2174 ″London Heraldic View″

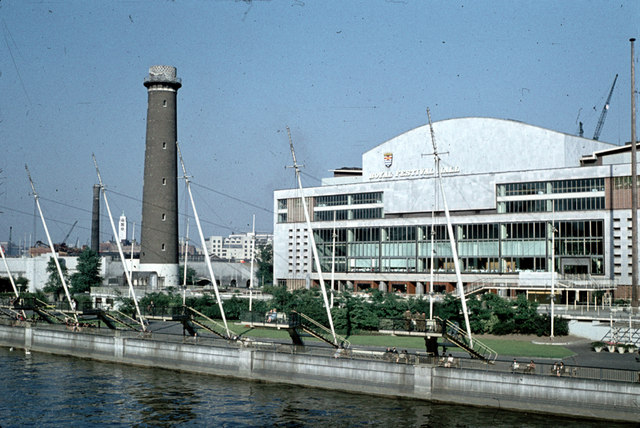
Shot tower on the left next to the Royal Festival Hall in 1959

The Shot Tower at the Lambeth Lead Works was a shot tower that stood on the South Bank of the River Thames in London, England, between Waterloo Bridge and Hungerford Bridge, on the site of what is now the Queen Elizabeth Hall. It was a prominent landmark on the river and featured in a number of paintings, including by J. M. W. Turner.

== History ==
The Shot Tower was built in 1826 for Thomas Maltby & Co., to a design by David Riddal Roper. In 1839 it was taken over by Walkers, Parker & Co., which also operated the square shot tower to the east of Waterloo Bridge. They operated the tower until 1949. Shortly after that it was featured near the end of the film Night and the City (1950). In 1950 the gallery chamber at the top of the tower was removed and a steel-framed superstructure was added instead, providing a radio beacon for the Festival of Britain held in 1951. The tower was the only existing building to be retained on the site for the Festival. The tower was demolished in 1962 to make way for the Queen Elizabeth Hall, which opened in 1967.

== Description ==
The tower was brick-built, with a slight taper. At the base it was 30 feet (9.1 m) in diameter, with 3-foot (0.91 m) thick walls. At the gallery located at the top, it was 20 feet (6.1 m) in diameter with 18-inch (460 mm) walls. The gallery chamber was surrounded by a cornice and parapet, with an iron balustrade. The gallery was 163 feet (50 m) high and was reached by a spiral staircase attached to the inside face of the wall. Halfway up there was a floor for making small lead shot. The gallery level at the top was used for making large shot.

In a lecture given in 1991 (now preserved in the British Library Sound Archive) Hugh Casson, who had been the Director of Architecture for the Festival of Britain in 1951, called the tower "an extraordinary device", and explained:

It's a factory chimney, with a staircase inside it, and you take hot lead up to the top, and you drop it down, in drops, and the drops don't make tears as you'd expect, to get thicker as they go, they're absolutely perfect globes, and they're tiny, you see, as you know, I mean, they're absolutely wee, like the shot you get inside a cartridge. And there were two old men, one at the bottom and one at the top. The one at the top was the one with the hot lead, and he dropped it down into a cold bucket at the bottom, and it cooled it off at once, and then it was taken away and sold. And these two old boys were rather like two old fishermen in a boat, they'd been there for years. And they didn't speak, most of the time they were separated by 150 feet of shaft.
