= R. C. M. Jenkins =

British police officer (1898–1973)

Robert Cyril Morton (RCM) Jenkins
- Born: 16 May 1898
- Died: 18 March 1973 (aged 74)
- Occupation: Police Officer
- Employer(s): Canterbury City Police; Penzance Borough Police; Folkestone Borough Police; Kent County Constabulary
- Spouse: Ethel M Jordan (m. 1919)
- Children: Marjorie V Jenkins; Donald B Jenkins; Roy C Jenkins

Robert Cyril Morton Jenkins, OBE, KPM, OStJ (1898–1973) was a senior British police officer. He served his entire working career in the force, save for a spell in the Army Infantry in the First World War, where he was a member of the Royal West Kent Regiment. Upon his retirement from the police in 1963, he had served 44 years. He was notable for opening an inquiry into serious allegations of misconduct by a number of officers of the Folkestone Borough Police at a time when Britain was suffering heavy bombing by the Luftwaffe and cross-channel shelling from occupied France.

== Early life ==
Jenkins was born Robert Cyril Morton Flint to medical student Isabella Murray Morton Flint, and was adopted by William and Bertha Jenkins circa 1898. Much of his childhood life is undocumented however he was recorded as Robert Morton Jenkins in the 1911 census, aged 13, as a school boy. He attended school in Stalisfield Green. William Jenkins was a woodcutter and farmer, and lived with Bertha and Robert at Darby’s Court in Stalisfield, near Faversham, Kent.

== Military service ==
Jenkins served in the First World War in the Royal East and West Kent Regiments, starting on 15 September 1914, seeing active service in France. From 1914 to 1916 he served with the 2/1 Royal East Kent Mounted Rifles Division as a Trooper, later serving as a Private with the 11th (Lewisham) and 8th Battalions of the Royal West Kent Regiment. In 1918 he was recommended for commission but was wounded before the arrangements could be made. He was released from the army in February 1919, his service at the front entitling him to the Victory Medal and the British War Medal. Jenkins contributed anecdotes of his time at war in France in the 1934 book 'The History of the 11th (Lewisham) Battalion' by Captain O.S. Russell. He was mentioned in dispatches by Field Marshall Sir Douglas Haig and the certificate issued in March 1919 is signed by Winston Churchill, Secretary of State for War at the time.

== Police career ==
=== Canterbury ===
He began his career as a Constable in 1919 with the Canterbury City Police and was the first post-war recruit for the Canterbury Force. The small force consisted of only 35 officers: a Chief Constable (CC), two Inspectors, five Sergeants and 27 Constables. During his probation he was tutored by PC Bertie Inge (known as Frank.) On 16 February 1919 he saw his first patrol on the Wincheap beat, which was a night shift. Jenkins gained his experience by observing and heeding the advice of his more seasoned colleagues, notably George Smith, Harry Robinson and the aforementioned Bertie Inge. He had attained the rank of Sergeant on 24 March 1924, and became an Inspector on 18 July 1928. In 1927 he travelled to London for training with the Metropolitan Police, where he learned criminal investigations. Upon returning to Canterbury he led the Criminal Investigations Department for the force. In 1931 he made an application for the post of Chief Constable of the Rochester City Police after the then CC Arnold retired due to ill-health after 52 years of service. Due to the sheer volume of applicants, he was not successful, with Herbert Allen of the Gravesend Borough Police attaining the appointment. Allen, however, only stayed in the post for two years, when Jenkins once again applied for the position in 1933, again unsuccessfully, losing out to Inspector H.P. Hind from Nottingham.

=== Penzance ===
In November 1936 he successfully applied for the position of Chief Constable of the Penzance Borough Police, taking over on 1 January 1937 from Chief Constable Harry Kenyon who had retired. Jenkins was appointed following a unanimous decision by the Penzance Police Watch Committee, and was secured a salary of £360 per annum, plus an additional £45 per annum for responsibilities required of him as the Inspector of Weights & Measures. Jenkins remained in Penzance until 8 December 1941 when he was appointed Chief Constable of Folkestone Borough Police at the height of the Second World War. Jenkins spent his time in Penzance expanding the small borough force, introducing a motor patrol and criminal investigations department. He would also build a successful Auxiliary Fire Service and co-operated successfully with the ARP and Home Guard in a series of drills. On his departure he was commended by the Police Watch Committee for transforming the borough police force into a highly efficient organisation, and it was stated that no other borough force in the country was as well-organised as Penzance. In 1939 the artist Stanhope Forbes was commissioned to paint a portrait of Jenkins on oil and canvas. This painting was left on the death of his wife to his grandson P.B.Jenkins who when informed of his grandfather's original wish that it should go to Devon and Cornwall police he transferred it to them accordingly. This painting still adorns a wall at the Devon & Cornwall Police Headquarters at Middlemoor, Exeter. In early 2015 the painting was cleaned up and restored thanks to a grant from the Heritage Lottery Fund.

=== Folkestone ===
His appointment was Chief Constable of Folkestone Borough Police Force, under collar number 4, later becoming Assistant Chief Constable (ACC) in the East Kent area on 1 April 1943 following the wartime amalgamation of the Folkestone force with the Kent County Constabulary. He was appointed Deputy Chief Constable (DCC) of the Kent County Constabulary on 22 April 1947, following the death in service of the incumbent. His decision to return to Kent is believed to have been at the behest of his wife Ethel; however other sources, such as the reference book Policing Kent 1800–2000, state that Jenkins was drafted in from Penzance by the Folkestone Police Watch Committee to sort out serious issues of integrity. He arrived at Folkestone during a time of significant scandal and very low morale amongst the ranks. In 1941, whilst Jenkins was still in Penzance, the then CC of Folkestone Alfred Beesley was under investigation for certain irregularities involving the unofficial use of police vehicles, using police-purchased petrol for personal use and for supplying fuel coupons to unauthorised persons. These allegations were made by one of his watchful officers, a Sergeant Floydd, who later suffered the wrath of Mr Beesley when he accused Floydd of making false entries in a patrol car’s log book. The charge was not upheld by the Watch Committee. A month later, Floydd reported Beesley for being drunk on his way to work, however Beesley was found not guilty. Beesley dismissed Floydd from the force, however the Police Watch Committee (the equivalent of the modern office of the Police Crime Commissioner) refused to ratify the punishment. The austere Mr Beesley was already unpopular even before his integrity was brought into question due to his dogmatic nature and difficulty in getting on with his colleagues. In 1942 Beesley’s position became untenable when one of his men, a PC Eric Morgan, was charged with 32 accounts of burglary to domestic and business premises. A handful of Morgan’s colleagues were also accused. With Beesley’s subsequent resignation, in stepped RCM Jenkins to sort out the mess. In the reference book The Gentleman at War, Jenkins is described by the author as a ‘strict but fair disciplinarian.’ In 1942 he set up an inquiry into the crimes of the aforementioned PC Morgan. At his trial, Morgan’s wife asked loudly ‘what about the others?’ and alleged that an additional 13 officers in the force were guilty of similar crimes dating back to 1935. The inquiry was assisted by two detectives from Scotland Yard, and it was determined that due to the large timeframe of the alleged crimes, bringing sufficient evidence to charge them and/or issue disciplinary action would be extremely difficult. Therefore, it was recommended that the accused officers should be dismissed from the force. Eventually, five constables made statements admitting their involvement and were dismissed. A sergeant denied involvement but was subsequently found unfit to continue and was instructed to resign. Others thought to have been involved were ultimately allowed to continue service in the absence of sufficient evidence. This scandal left the force utterly demoralised at a time when the town was being subject to heavy bombing by the Luftwaffe, and cross-channel shelling from mainland France. Folkestone’s amalgamation into the new County Constabulary was, according to the author of Policing Kent 1800–2000, the saving grace for the remaining officers, as it made it possible to bring in outside men and ‘dilute’ the officer pool. Ultimately this would make steps towards raising the morale and improving the reputation of the police in Folkestone. In 1944, he was transferred to the police headquarters in Maidstone following further reshuffling of the new force’s command structure. Whilst at Kent, he served under Chief Constables Sir Percy Sillitoe KBE, Major Sir John Ferguson and Colonel Geoffrey White. Sillitoe is notable for his service as Director General of MI5 from 1946 to 1953, and for introducing the advent of portable police radios, civilian police roles and the compulsory retirement rule after 30 years service. Sillitoe also introduced the chequered band that now adorns the standard UK police flat cap (to distinguish the mid-twentieth century bobby from postmen and bus drivers.)

In November 1942 Jenkins was injured during an air raid.

== World War II ==
During the conflict, it was the responsibility of local police forces to document every bomb site, something which he and his staff kept detailed records of. Unfortunately these records were destroyed after he retired. Kent was an important county during the war, and was thought to be a probable avenue for invasion by Germany. Even before Jenkins’ arrived at Folkestone, Germany had attempted to land spies in the county in preparation for invasion, which by 1940 had been well-planned by Hitler. Herne Bay in Kent was used for test trials of the "bouncing bomb" eventually to be deployed during Operation Chastise by No. 617 Squadron RAF – better known as "The Dambusters." A colleague of Jenkins, an Inspector Setterfield, was responsible for overseeing the bomb trials in the county. The police had the unenviable task of training up the local Home Guard, managing the disorder caused by visiting allied troops and dealing with the aftermath of German air raids. The officers of Kent, and indeed other towns targeted by the Germans, were the only persons obliged to perform such tasks as ensuring all lights were switched off during a raid (even going so far as snuffing out the odd offending light bulb with an air rifle) and pulling civilians from the wreckage of their own bombed homes. Captured German pilots were often thrown into the same cells as the common miscreant, with one recorded example of four enemy prisoners rounded up and taken back to an officer’s house, where the officer told his wife to make sure they didn’t leave. With the war also came a period of amalgamation for local police forces, with many of the smaller ones absorbed and reformed into larger organisations. Folkestone became part of Kent County Constabulary in 1943, with Jenkins taking the post of ACC No. 3 District, based in Folkestone. Other boroughs and cities ordered to merge were Canterbury, Tunbridge Wells, Rochester, Ramsgate and Margate. The order to merge was made on 1 April 1943 and although compulsory was touted as a temporary measure. Post-war though, these forces never regained their autonomy. The 1946 Police Act saw further reform, with his former force in Penzance absorbed into the Cornwall County Constabulary. Between 1940 and 1944, many Kent officers were killed during air raids. Amongst those killed included members of the Kent Special Constabulary, some of whom had served in World War 1 and had offered their services to the county irrespective of age or infirmity. On 1 January 1946 Jenkins, and a number of senior British police officers in England and Wales, received the King’s Police and Fire Services Medal for Distinguished Service. Details of the honours were listed in the Supplement to the London Gazette. In 1949 he received the King’s Police Medal for Conspicuous Dedication to Duty.

== Later career and death ==
RCM Jenkins was the Chairman of the Kent County Constabulary Sports Club and regularly played in the Kent Police Bowls Division. He was made a serving Brother of the Venerable Order of Saint John on 1 January 1950. In 1951 his force saw the murder of one of their own when PC Alan George Baxter was shot dead by army deserter Alan Poole. The subsequent operation to apprehend Poole was attended in person by CC John Ferguson. The siege ended with Poole’s death when he was shot in the chest by a police marksman. In 1952, he was seconded to Newport Borough Police to see the force through a period of upheaval when its Chief Constable Clifford Montague Harris was reprimanded for a number of indiscretions in office.

Jenkins was bestowed an OBE in the 1953 New Year Honours. He assumed the position of Acting Chief Constable in 1962 when CC Geoffrey White collapsed and died at an ACPO dinner. White was a comparatively young man who was said to have fired the force with his enthusiasm, a starkly different man than his decidedly austere predecessor. His death was a shock to all. He retired on 16 May 1963 aged 65, after 44 years and 89 days of service, with an exemplary record. In his retirement he wrote articles for local newspapers, including a piece for the Kentish Gazette in 1964, in which he reminisced about his time at the Canterbury City Police, almost fifty years after his tenure at the small force. Jenkins died of a heart condition on 18 March 1973 at his home in Bearsted, and was survived by his wife Ethel. According to his relatives, knowledge of Jenkins’ ailment was kept secret from Ethel until his death. His funeral took place at Bearsted Church near Maidstone in 1973 and was organised by the Kent police. One of the uniformed pallbearers in attendance was his great-nephew, also a police officer at the time. Ethel died in 1987, and the house they shared, custom-built according to Jenkins' specification, was later demolished.

== Family and personal life ==
Whilst at Canterbury, before he was married, he took lodgings at 8 New Street, St. Dunstan’s, the marital home of his colleague and mentor PC Bertie Inge, and his wife Julia [nee Jordan] and their three children. Jenkins had served in the same trench as Frank Jordan in France in the First World War, and sent letters to Frank's family on his behalf, as Frank could not read or write. Frank's sister Ethel replied for the family, and post-war Robert and Ethel would meet and eventually marry. They wed on 30 September 1919 at St Werburgh’s Anglican Church in Hoo, Kent. Robert and Ethel had three children; two sons Roy and Donald, and a daughter, Marjorie. Marjorie married, but would suffer tragedy when her husband Roy Taylor perished in the 1957 Lewisham rail crash. Roy married Kitty (Kathleen Ann nee Delaney) and became a fruit farmer at Court Lane Farm, Hadlow, Kent. Donald married Effie (née James) in 1944 and had two sons Barrie and Peter. Donald became The Engineer and Surveyor of Dartford Council, then became The Planning Officer at Sevenoaks council. Jenkins and his wife Ethel backed their son Roy in a fruit growing venture and were founder members of R.C.Jenkins Limited. The company purchased a block of orchards at Hadlow, Kent in 1957 named Court Lane Farm. The 63 acres of orchards were planted with culinary and dessert apples. Roy had trained at the Kent Farm Institute and worked in the fruit industry and it was his ambition to become a fruit grower. Jenkins was involved in the enterprise and dealt with administrative matters leaving Roy to manage the business. During the 1960s the farm was developed with the building of a farmhouse and range of farm buildings including cold storage facilities. In 1969 Roy became ill and died as a result of a heart attack on 20 December leaving Kitty a widow and three school-age children. Jenkins now took on the management of the enterprise to ensure its survival until Roys eldest son Paul was able to take over. During the next three years, Jenkins oversaw significant improvements in the enterprise including a major investment in grubbing old orchards and planting modern intensive orchards on dwarf rootstocks and mechanisation of plant and machinery. Jenkins proved himself a capable fruit farmer and by the time of his death, the farm and enterprise were in good heart. Many of Jenkins’ relatives serve or have served in the police, in Coventry, Wales and Kent from 1901 to the present day. Jenkins' tenure in Penzance left its mark, he loved Cornwall and holidayed there many times after he transferred to Kent. Jenkins was a man of smart bearing and always dressed immaculately whether in or out of uniform. Habitually when off duty he would wear a smart suit and a brown trilby hat. He was highly dedicated and put everything into his work. When at home he would spend a lot of his time in his private study or associating with friends. He lived with Ethel at 109 Ashford Road in Bearsted, Maidstone, until his death. Although his given name was Cyril, he was affectionately referred to by those close to him as "Jenks."
