= HMS Lynx (1894) =

Ferret-class destroyer

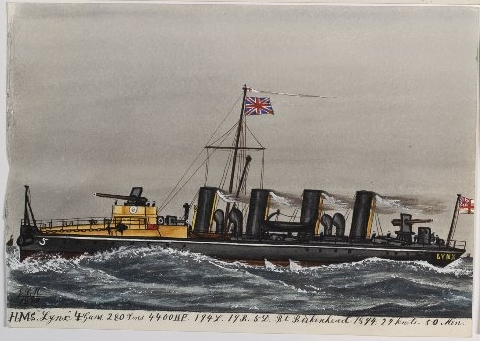
- Lynx

History

United Kingdom
- Name: HMS Lynx
- Builder: Laird, Son & Co., Birkenhead
- Laid down: July 1893
- Launched: 9 December 1893
- Completed: March 1895
- Fate: Scrapped, 1912

General characteristics
- Class & type: Ferret-class destroyer
- Displacement: 199 long tons (202 t)
- Length: 210 ft (64 m)
- Beam: 19.25 ft (5.9 m)
- Draught: 9 ft (2.7 m)
- Propulsion: Vertical triple-expansion steam engines; Coal-fired Normand boilers; 4,000 hp (2,983 kW)
- Speed: 26 knots (48 km/h; 30 mph)
- Armament: 1 × QF 12-pounder gun; 3 × 6-pounder guns; 3 × 18 inch (450 mm) torpedo tubes

HMS Lynx was a Ferret-class destroyer which served with the Royal Navy. She was launched in 1894 and sold in 1912.

== Construction ==
In April 1892, the British Admiralty sent out a request to several shipbuilders for designs and tenders for "large sea going torpedo boats", or what later became known as "Torpedo Boat Destroyers", to be built under the 1892–1893 shipbuilding programme. In January 1893, an order was placed for two ships with Laird & Co., following on from orders placed in July the previous year with the specialist torpedo boat builders Yarrows and Thornycroft.

The Admiralty did not specify a standard design for destroyers, laying down broad requirements, including a trial speed of 27 knots (31 mph; 50 km/h), a "turtleback" (Note: A fore deck with exaggerated camber designed to throw off sea water at high speeds.) forecastle and armament, which was to vary depending on whether the ship was to be used in the torpedo boat or gunboat role. Laird's design was 199 feet 0 inches (60.66 m) long overall and 195 feet 0 inches (59.44 m) between perpendiculars, with a beam of 19 feet 8 inches (5.99 m) and a draught of 9 feet 0 inches (2.74 m). Displacement was 280 long tons (280 t) normal and 350 long tons (360 t) deep load. Four Normand Normand water-tube boilers fed steam to 2 three-cylinder triple-expansion steam engines rated at 4,475 indicated horsepower (3,337 kW). Four funnels were fitted.

As a torpedo boat, the planned armament was a single QF 12 pounder 12 cwt (3 in (76 mm) calibre) gun on a platform on the ship's conning tower (in practice the platform was also used as the ship's bridge) and one six-pounder (57mm) gun aft, with a single fixed 18 inch (450 mm) torpedo tube in the ship's bow and two more 18 inch tubes on a rotating mount. As a gunboat, the two swivelling torpedo tubes could be removed to accommodate a further two six-pounders.

Lynx was laid down at Laird's Birkenhead shipyard on 1 July 1893 as yard number 597 and was launched on 24 January 1894. She carried out sea trials in August 1894, successfully reaching the contract speed of 27 knots, but had problems steering when running astern, and was not completed until August 1895.

== Service history ==
On 26 December 1894, Lynx ran aground off the coast of Cornwall, receiving serious damage. Lynx took part in the Royal Navy's annual manoeuvres in July 1896. On 26 June 1897 she was present at the Jubilee Fleet Review at Spithead. On 30 September 1897, Lynx and the destroyer Thrasher ran aground in thick fog off Dodman Point in Cornwall. A steam main aboard Thrasher ruptured as a result of the impact, killing four stokers, with Lynx less badly damaged. Both ships were refloated, with Lynx sailing to Devonport for repair. While Thrasher's commanding officer was severely reprimanded for "reckless navigation" in the resulting Court Martial, Lynx's commanding officer was acquitted.

Lynx served in the Devonport instructional flotilla, when in early February 1900 she was transferred to become tender to the torpedo school ship HMS Defiance off Devonport. In 1902 she served in the Channel Squadron, underwent repairs to re-tube her boilers in May, and took part in the Coronation Review for King Edward VII in August.

In February 1908, inspection revealed that Lynx's deck plating and bulkheads were rusting through. On 10 April 1912, she was sold for scrap to Ward's of Preston.

== Sources ==
- Brassey, T. A., ed. (1897). The Naval Annual 1897. Portsmouth, UK: J Griffin and Co.
- Brassey, T. A., ed. (1898). The Naval Annual 1898. Portsmouth, UK: J Griffin and Co.
- Chesneau, Roger; Kolesnik, Eugene M. (1979). Conway's All The World's Fighting Ships 1860–1905. London: Conway Maritime Press. ISBN 0-85177-133-5.
- Friedman, Norman (2009). British Destroyers: From Earliest Days to the Second World War. Barnsley, UK: Seaforth Publishing. ISBN 978-1-84832-049-9.
- Gardiner, Robert; Lambert, Andrew, eds. (1992). Steam, Steel & Shellfire: The Steam Warship 1815–1905. Conway's History of the Ship. London: Conway Maritime Press. ISBN 0-85177-564-0.
- Lyon, David (2001) [1996]. The First Destroyers. London: Caxton Editions. ISBN 1-84067-3648.
