= List of shipwrecks in September 1871 =

The list of shipwrecks in September 1871 includes ships sunk, foundered, grounded, or otherwise lost during September 1871.

== 1 September ==
In the whaling disaster of 1871, 32 American whaling ships – one of them registered in the Kingdom of Hawaii – were trapped in pack ice in the Chukchi Sea in a line about 60 miles (97 km) south of Point Franklin, Department of Alaska, and abandoned between 1 and 14 September. All 1,219 people aboard the ships were rescued by seven other whaling ships – Arctic, Chance, Daniel Webster, Europa, Lagoda, Midas, and Progress – that had not become trapped. One trapped vessel, Minerva was discovered intact in 1872 and returned to service, but the other ships were crushed in the ice, sank, wrecked on the coast, or were stripped of wood or burned by the local Inupiat people. Details of each wreck are below.

List of shipwrecks: 1 September 1871
Ship	State	Description
Arrow	United Kingdom	The ship departed from Sierra Leone on this date. No further trace, presumed foundered with the loss of all hands.
George	United Kingdom	The ship sprang a leak and was beached at Campbeltown, Argyllshire.
Gilbert	United Kingdom	The derelict schooner was discovered in the River Mersey. She was taken in to Liverpool, Lancashire.
John	United Kingdom	The steam barge exploded and sank off Penarth, Glamorgan with the loss of two of her crew. She was on a voyage from Penarth to Bristol, Gloucestershire.
John Bullock	New South Wales	The schooner was wrecked at the mouth of the Richmond River.
Roman	United States	Illustration of the whaling ships trapped by ice in September 1871 in the whaling disaster of 1871. Whaling disaster of 1871: The 358-ton whaling ship was crushed by ice and lost in the Chukchi Sea off the Seahorse Islands (70°53′N 158°42′W) off the coast of the Department of Alaska near Point Belcher (70°47′40″N 159°39′02″W). Her crew survived.

== 2 September ==
List of shipwrecks: 2 September 1871
Ship	State	Description
Comet	Hawaiian Kingdom	Whaling disaster of 1871: The whaling brig was crushed in ice in the Chukchi Sea off the coast of the Department of Alaska between Point Franklin and the Seahorse Islands. Her crew survived.
Chiozza	Flag unknown	The ship was driven ashore at "Argain".
Emporia	United States	The fishing schooner was lost in a gale on the Georges Bank. Lost with all 9 crewmen.
Henry	United Kingdom	The Thames barge was run into by the steamship Maastroom (Netherlands) and sank in the River Thames.
Miranda	United Kingdom	The yacht was run down and sunk in the Firth of Clyde by the steamship Eagle (United Kingdom) with the loss of one of the three people on board. Survivors were rescued by Eagle.
Mongyne	United Kingdom	The ship foundered in the South China Sea in a typhoon with the loss of 28 lives, 3 crew survived. She was on a voyage from Rangoon, Burma to Fuzhou (Foochow), China.
Montrose	United States	The fishing Schooner sunk in a gale on the Georges Bank. Lost with all 8 hands.
Nonpareil	United Kingdom	The fishing smack foundered in the Irish Sea. Her crew were rescued.
Notre Dame	France	The lugger was driven ashore at Concarneau, Finistère.
Peacock	United Kingdom	The brig capsized at Fjällbacka, Sweden with the loss of all eight crew.
Phœnix	United Kingdom	The brig was driven ashore at Hartlepool, County Durham. She was on a voyage from Gävle, Sweden to Hartlepool. She was refloated the next day and beached.
Ricardo II	Italy	The ship departed from New York, United States for Gloucester, United Kingdom. No further trace, presumed foundered with the loss of all hands.
Roline Maria	Netherlands	The barque was driven ashore in a typhoon and wrecked at Macao, China with the loss of seven of her crew.
T. B. Ord	Netherlands	The ship ran aground in the Scheldt between Brouwershaven and Hellevoetsluis, Zeeland. She was on a voyage from Iquique, Peru to a Dutch port. She was refloated and taken in to Hellevoetsluis.
YC-6	Royal Navy	The yard craft – formerly the Clown-class gunboat HMS Clown – was lost in a typhoon at Hong Kong.
YC-7	Royal Navy	The yard craft – formerly the Albacore-class gunboat HMS Forester – was lost in a typhoon at Hong Kong.

== 3 September ==
List of shipwrecks: 3 September 1871
Ship	State	Description
Atrevida	New South Wales	The brig was driven ashore in a typhoon at Hong Kong.
Colombo	United Kingdom	The ship was abandoned at sea in a typhoon. Her eleven crew survived. She was on a voyage from Saigon, French Indo-China to Hong Kong. On 20 September, she was towed in to Hong Kong, where she sank.
Cornuvia	United Kingdom	The full-rigged ship was damaged in a typhoon at Hong Kong.
Coryphens	United Kingdom	The barque foundered in the Coral Sea. Her crew took to a boat; they were rescued on 1 October by the full-rigged ship Borealis (New South Wales). Coryphens was on a voyage from Fuzhou (Foo Chow Foo), China to Melbourne, Victoria.
Courier	United Kingdom	The brig was driven ashore and severely damaged in a typhoon at Hong Kong.
Edward and Marie	Netherlands	The ship was driven ashore in a typhoon at Hong Kong.
Gaviote	United Kingdom	The schooner was driven ashore in a typhoon at Hong Kong.
Hans	Germany	The full-rigged ship sank in a typhoon with the loss of all but one of her crew. She was on a voyage from Ningbo (Ningpo), China to Hong Kong.
Livonia	United Kingdom	The schooner ran aground on the Pennington Spit, off the coast of Hampshire.
Mexicana	United Kingdom	The brig was wrecked in a typhoon 3 nautical miles (5.6 km) off Lintin Island, Hong Kong with the loss of all but one of those on board. She was on a voyage from Shantou (Swatow), China to Hong Kong.
Nancy	France	The ship was driven out to sea from Hong Kong in a typhoon and foundered with the loss of her captain.
Roline Marie	United Kingdom	The ship sank in a typhoon at Hong Kong.
Selina Jane	United Kingdom	The brig was driven ashore in a typhoon at Hong Kong. She was consequently condemned.
Sylphide	New South Wales	The brig was driven ashore in a typhoon at Hong Kong.
Vistula	El Salvador	The ship sank in a typhoon at Hong Kong.
four unnamed vessels	Flags unknown	The ships were driven ashore in a typhoon at Hong Kong.

== 4 September ==
List of shipwrecks: 4 September 1871
Ship	State	Description
Leander	Russia	The steamship was driven ashore on Naissaar.Her passengers were taken off. She was on a voyage from Riga to Saint Petersburg. She was refloated on 8 September and taken in to Reval.
Nordhavet	United Kingdom	The steamship was driven ashore at North Cape, Prince Edward Island, Canada. She was on a voyage from Shediac, Nova Scotia, Canada to the Bristol Channel. She was later refloated and taken in to Pictou, Nova Scotia, Canada for repairs.
S. D. Richards	United Kingdom	The ship was wrecked on Fernando Po.
Sir George Gray	United Kingdom	The ship was destroyed by fire at Colombo, Ceylon. Her crew were rescued.

== 5 September ==
List of shipwrecks: 5 September 1871
Ship	State	Description
Gitana, and Helene	United Kingdom; Germany	The steamship Helene collided with the steamship Gitana and sank on the Krautsand, in the North Sea. She was on a voyage from Hamburg to Stettin. Gitana was consequently beached on the Krautsand. She was on a voyage from Hartlepool, County Durham to Hamburg. She was refloated and taken in to the Elbe.

== 6 September ==
List of shipwrecks: 6 September 1871
Ship	State	Description
Augusta May	United Kingdom	The barque was wrecked on the Longsand, in the North Sea off the coast of Essex. Her crew were rescued by Deerhound and Increase (both United Kingdom). Augusta May was on a voyage from Grimsby, Lincolnshire to Mauritius.
Caroline Henriette	Germany	The brig was abandoned at sea. Her crew were rescued by Balance (United Kingdom). Caroline Henriette was on a voyage from Riga, Russia to Bo'ness, Lothian, United Kingdom.
City of Venice	United Kingdom	The ship was wrecked on Rodrigues. Her crew survived. She was on a voyage from the Clyde to Bombay, India.
Protégé de Marie	France	The ship was wrecked near Les Sables d'Olonne, Vendée. Her crew were rescued.

== 7 September ==
List of shipwrecks: 7 September 1871
Ship	State	Description
Charger	United Kingdom	The ship ran aground in the River Avon. She was on a voyage from Quebec City, Canada to Bristol, Gloucestershire. Also reported to be ashore at Belfast, County Antrim. She was later refloated and towed in to port.
Copernicus	Germany	The barque was beached at Blackwall, Middlesex, United Kingdom. She was refloated the next day.
Florida	United States	Whaling disaster of 1871: The 470-ton whaling barque was abandoned in ice in the Chukchi Sea off the coast of the Department of Alaska near Point Belcher (70°47′40″N 159°39′02″W). Her crew survived. Her wreck, burned to the waterline, was found aground in the Seahorse Islands in 1872.
Lively	United Kingdom	The ship collided with Magellan (France) in the North Sea. She was taken in to Great Yarmouth, Norfolk in a derelict condition.
Peard	Canada	The brigantine departed from Swansea, Glamorgan, United Kingdom for Saint-Nazaire, Ille-et-Vilaine, France. No further trace, presumed foundered with the loss of all hands.
Phœbus	France	The brig was wrecked at Lagos, Africa. Her crew were rescued.
Victoria	United States	Whaling disaster of 1871: The 149-ton brig was abandoned in ice in the Chukchi Sea off the coast of the Department of Alaska near Point Belcher (70°47′40″N 159°39′02″W). Her crew survived.

== 8 September ==
List of shipwrecks: 8 September 1871
Ship	State	Description
Annsbro'	United Kingdom	The steamship ran aground at Girvan, Ayrshire. She was refloated and beached.
Awashonks	United States	Whaling disaster of 1871: The 376-ton whaling barque was crushed between two ice floes and lost in the Chukchi Sea off the Seahorse Islands (70°53′N 158°42′W) off the coast of the Alaska Territory near Point Belcher (70°47′40″N 159°39′02″W). Her crew survived and was rescued by other whaling ships.
Indiana	United Kingdom	The ship ran aground on the Beaumont Reef. She was on a voyage from Liverpool, Lancashire to Quebec City, Canada. She was refloated on 11 September and taken in to Quebec City.
Phoebus	France	The barque ran aground at Lagos, Africa.
Sachem	United States	The schooner took on water and sank at Georges Bank near Gloucester, Massachusetts. The crew was saved by the schooner Pescador.

== 9 September ==
List of shipwrecks: 9 September 1871
Ship	State	Description
Earl	United Kingdom	The Thames barge collided with a steamship and sank in the Thames Estuary. Her crew were rescued.
Grace	United Kingdom	The ship departed from "Doboy" for Appledore. No further trace, presumed foundered with the loss of all hands.
Good Intent	United Kingdom	The fishing vessel was driven ashore and wrecked at Dornoch, Sutherland. Her crew were rescued. She was on a voyage from Staxigo, Caithness to Inverness.

== 10 September ==
List of shipwrecks: 10 September 1871
Ship	State	Description
John	United Kingdom	The schooner foundered off Newquay, Cornwall. Her crew were rescued.
Margaret Kendall	United Kingdom	The schooner sprang a leak and was beached at Hubberston Pill, Pembrokeshire. She was on a voyage from Barrow-in-Furness, Lancashire to Llanelly, Glamorgan.
Merton	United Kingdom	The schooner was driven ashore at Duporth, Cornwall. Her crew were rescued.
Rose	United Kingdom	The schooner was beached at the Mumbles, Glamorgan. She was on a voyage from Porthcawl, Glamorgan to Porth Navas, Cornwall. She was refloated and taken in to Swansea, Glamorgan in a waterlogged condition.
Star	(United Kingdom of Great Britain and Ireland) Jersey	The smack ran aground on the Bembridge Ledge, off the Isle of Wight and sank. Her crew survived.
Vanderbyl	United Kingdom	The ship ran aground at Airds Point, Dumfriesshire. She was on a voyage from Liverpool, Lancashire to Dumfries. She was refloated and beached at Ketton, Dumfriesshire. Subsequently placed under repair.

== 11 September ==
List of shipwrecks: 11 September 1871
Ship	State	Description
Alfred and Edwin	United Kingdom	The sloop ran aground on the Gat Sand, in the Lynn Deeps. She was refloated with assistance from a smack and taken in to Boston, Lincolnshire.
George	United Kingdom	The schooner collided with the brigantine Magyar (Flag unknown) and sank at the Mumbles, Glamorgan. Her crew were rescued. George was on a voyage from Newport, Monmouthshire to Waterford. She was later refloated.
Grossherzogin Alexandrine	Germany	The ship struck a sunken wreck and foundered in the North Sea. Her crew were rescued. She was on a voyage from Clackmannan, United Kingdom to Danzig.
Neva	United Kingdom	The brigantine ran aground at Warrenpoint, County Antrim.
Princess	United Kingdom	The ship was run ashore at "Port Sussex", Falkland Islands. She was on a voyage from Newport, Monmouthshire to Caldera, Chile.
HMS Racer	Royal Navy	The Racer-class sloop ran aground off Ryde, Isle of Wight. She was refloated with the assistance of a tug and taken in to Portsmouth, Hampshire.
Teresina	Italy	The brig was destroyed by fire 5 nautical miles (9.3 km) off Cagliari, Sardinia. Her crew were rescued. She was on a voyage from Odesa, Russia to Marseille, Bouches-du-Rhône, France.
Trent	United Kingdom	The steamship ran aground in Lake St. Peter. She was on a voyage from Montreal, Quebec, Canada to Dublin. She was refloated on 25 September and taken in to Quebec City.

== 12 September ==
List of shipwrecks: 12 September 1871
Ship	State	Description
Amelia	United Kingdom	The tug collided with Neptune (United Kingdom) and sank off Clevedon, Somerset. Her crew were rescued.
Acadia	United Kingdom	The steamship ran aground on the Meloria Bank, in the Mediterranean Sea. She was on a voyage from Genoa, Italy to New York, United States. She was refloated and taken in to Gibraltar.
Osprey	United Kingdom	The ship foundered off the Craw Rock. Her crew were rescued. She was on a voyage from Swansea, Glamorgan to Dublin.
Talavera	United Kingdom	The ship was driven ashore and wrecked at San Ramon, California. Her crew were rescued. She was on a voyage from Newcastle upon Tyne, Northumberland to San Francisco, California.

== 13 September ==
List of shipwrecks: 13 September 1871
Ship	State	Description
Damrovsky	Russia	The ship collided with Petropavlovsk (Imperial Russian Navy) off Reval and was damaged.
Fiona	United Kingdom	The steamship ran aground in the Argeş River at Olteniţa, Ottoman Empire. She was on a voyage from Liverpool, Lancashire to Galaţi, Ottoman Empire.
Hermann Heinrich	Netherlands	The schooner ran aground near Brielle, South Holland. She was refloated the next day.
Jean	France	The brig struck a floating baulk of timber off the Runnel Stone and sank with the loss of two of her eight crew. Survivors were rescued by the steamship Constance (United Kingdom). Jean was on a voyage from Cardiff, Glamorgan, United Kingdom to Havre de Grâce, Seine-Inférieure.
Mackay	United Kingdom	The barque was driven ashore in Struys Bay. Her crew were rescued. She was on a voyage from Algoa Bay to Table Bay.
Monticello	United States	Whaling disaster of 1871: The 356-ton whaling barque was abandoned in ice in the Chukchi Sea off the coast of the Department of Alaska near Wainwright Inlet. Her crew survived.
N. S. Delle Grazie	Italy	The waterlogged ship was beached at Newcastle, County Down, United Kingdom. She was on a voyage from Glasgow, Renfrewshire, United Kingdom to Savona.

== 14 September ==
List of shipwrecks: 14 September 1871
Ship	State	Description
Berbice	United Kingdom	The barque capsized and sank at Briton Ferry, Glamorgan.
Broedertrouw	Netherlands	The ship ran aground in the Vliedijk. She was on a voyage from Saint Petersburg, Russia to Amsterdam, North Holland. She was later refloated and towed in to Harlingen, Friesland.
Carlotta	United States	Whaling disaster of 1871: The 480-ton whaling barque was abandoned in ice in the Chukchi Sea off the coast of the Department of Alaska near Point Belcher (70°47′40″N 159°39′02″W). Her crew survived.
Champion	United States	Whaling disaster of 1871: The 367-ton full-rigged whaling ship was abandoned in ice in the Chukchi Sea off the coast of the Department of Alaska near Point Belcher (70°47′40″N 159°39′02″W). Her crew survived.
Columbia	United Kingdom	The steamship arrived at Fire Island, New York, United States on fire. She was on a voyage from Glasgow, Renfrewshire to New York City, United States. The fire was extinguished.
Concordia	United States	Whaling disaster of 1871: The 368-ton whaling barque was abandoned in ice in the Chukchi Sea off the coast of the Department of Alaska near Point Belcher (70°47′40″N 159°39′02″W). Her crew survived. Her wreck was found in 1872, destroyed by fire.
Contest	United States	Whaling disaster of 1871: The 341-ton whaling ship – sources differ on whether she was a barque or a full-rigged ship – was abandoned in ice in the Chukchi Sea off the coast of the Department of Alaska near Point Belcher (70°47′40″N 159°39′02″W). Her crew survived.
Esther	United Kingdom	The Mersey Flat collided with Dolbadern Castle and sank at Liverpool, Lancashire. She was on a voyage from Liverpool to Chester, Cheshire.
Elizabeth Swift	United States	Whaling disaster of 1871: The 327-ton whaling barque was abandoned in ice in the Chukchi Sea off the coast of the Department of Alaska near Point Belcher (70°47′40″N 159°39′02″W) near Wainwright Inlet. Her crew survived.
Emily Morgan	United States	Whaling disaster of 1871: The 365-ton whaling barque was abandoned in ice in the Chukchi Sea off the coast of the Department of Alaska near Point Belcher (70°47′40″N 159°39′02″W). Her crew survived.
Eugenia	United States	Whaling disaster of 1871: The 315-ton whaling barque was abandoned in ice in the Chukchi Sea off the coast of the Department of Alaska near Point Belcher (70°47′40″N 159°39′02″W). Her crew survived.
Fanny	United States	Whaling disaster of 1871: The 391-ton whaling barque was abandoned in ice in the Chukchi Sea off the coast of the Department of Alaska near Point Belcher (70°47′40″N 159°39′02″W). Her crew survived.
Farnley Hall	United Kingdom	The steamship caught fire in the English Channel off Portland, Dorset and put in to Portland, Dorset where the fire was extinguished with assistance from HMS Achilles (Royal Navy). Farnley Hall was on a voyage from Huelva, Spain to Harwich, Essex.
Gay Head	United States	Whaling disaster of 1871: The 300-ton whaling barque was abandoned in ice in the Chukchi Sea off the coast of the Department of Alaska near Point Belcher (70°47′40″N 159°39′02″W). Her crew survived. Her wreck was found in 1872, destroyed by fire.
George	United States	Whaling disaster of 1871: The 259-ton whaling barque was abandoned in ice in the Chukchi Sea off the coast of the Department of Alaska near Point Belcher (70°47′40″N 159°39′02″W). Her crew survived.
George Howland	United States	Whaling disaster of 1871: The 361-ton whaling barque was abandoned in ice in the Chukchi Sea off the coast of the Department of Alaska near Point Belcher (70°47′40″N 159°39′02″W). Her crew survived.
Henry Taber	United States	Whaling disaster of 1871: The 296-ton whaling barque was abandoned in ice in the Chukchi Sea off the coast of the Department of Alaska near Point Belcher (70°47′40″N 159°39′02″W). Her crew survived.
Isabella	Netherlands	The schooner was damaged by an onboard explosion at South Shields, County Durham, United Kingdom. Two of her crew were injured.
J. D. Thompson	United States	Whaling disaster of 1871: The 432-ton whaling barque was abandoned in ice in the Chukchi Sea off the coast of the Department of Alaska near Point Belcher (70°47′40″N 159°39′02″W). Her crew survived.
John Wells	United States	Whaling disaster of 1871: The 357-ton whaling barque was abandoned in ice in the Chukchi Sea off the coast of the Department of Alaska near Point Belcher (70°47′40″N 159°39′02″W). Her crew survived.
Julian	United States	Whaling disaster of 1871: The 290-ton full-rigged whaling ship was abandoned in ice in the Chukchi Sea off the coast of the Department of Alaska near Point Belcher (70°47′40″N 159°39′02″W). Her crew survived.
Lion	Canada	The tug ran aground and was wrecked at Richibucto, New Brunswick. Her crew were rescued.
Lord Redhaven	United Kingdom	The schooner was driven ashore at East Wemyss, Fife. She was on a voyage from Cullen, Moray to East Wemyss. She was refloated and found to be severely leaky.
Mary	United States	Whaling disaster of 1871: The 373-ton whaling ship was abandoned in ice in the Chukchi Sea off the coast of the Department of Alaska near Point Belcher (70°47′40″N 159°39′02″W). Her crew survived.
Massachusetts	United States	Whaling disaster of 1871: The 356-ton whaling barque was abandoned in ice in the Chukchi Sea off the coast of the Department of Alaska near Point Belcher (70°47′40″N 159°39′02″W). Her crew survived. Later reports indicate that her wreck eventually drifted around Point Barrow into the Beaufort Sea and was looted by Alaska Natives.
Minerva	United States	Whaling disaster of 1871: The 337-ton whaling barque was abandoned in ice in the Chukchi Sea off the coast of the Department of Alaska near Point Belcher (70°47′40″N 159°39′02″W). By the spring of 1872, she had drifted around to the entrance of Wainwright Inlet. Her crew survived. She was salvaged in 1872.
Navy	United States	Whaling disaster of 1871: The 385-ton whaling barque was abandoned in ice in the Chukchi Sea off the coast of the Department of Alaska near Point Belcher (70°47′40″N 159°39′02″W). Her crew survived.
Oliver Crocker	United States	Whaling disaster of 1871: The 305-ton whaling barque was abandoned in ice in the Chukchi Sea off the coast of the Department of Alaska near Point Belcher (70°47′40″N 159°39′02″W). Her crew survived.
Paiea	United States	Whaling disaster of 1871: The 386-ton barque was abandoned in ice in the Chukchi Sea off the coast of the Department of Alaska near Point Belcher (70°47′40″N 159°39′02″W) near Wainwright Inlet (70°36′N 160°00′W). Her crew survived.
Parthenia	United Kingdom	The brig ran aground on the Grain Spit, off the north Kent coast. She was on a voyage from Danzig, Germany to London. She was refloated with the assistance of a tug and resumed her voyage.
Reindeer	United States	Whaling disaster of 1871: The 332.33-ton wooden ship was abandoned in ice in the Chukchi Sea off the coast of the Department of Alaska near Point Belcher (70°47′40″N 159°39′02″W) and Wainwright Inlet (70°36′N 160°00′W). Her crew survived.
Seneca	United States	Whaling disaster of 1871: The 328-ton whaler was abandoned in ice in the Chukchi Sea off the coast of the Department of Alaska near Point Belcher (70°47′40″N 159°39′02″W). Her crew survived. Her wreck was found during 1872 frozen solidly in the ice with its bowsprit and rudder missing and its bulwarks stove in after being dragged by ice a distance up the coast.
Thomas Dickason	United States	Whaling disaster of 1871: The 461-ton whaler was abandoned in ice in the Chukchi Sea off the coast of the Department of Alaska near Point Belcher (70°47′40″N 159°39′02″W). Her crew survived. Her wreck was found during the summer of 1872 lying on its side on the shore, bilged and full of water.
William Rotch	United States	Whaling disaster of 1871: The 290-ton barque was forced ashore by ice and abandoned without loss of life south of Wainwright Inlet (70°36′N 160°00′W) near Point Barrow, Department of Alaska. Her crew survived.

== 15 September ==
List of shipwrecks: 15 September 1871
Ship	State	Description
Belgiel	Germany	The barque was driven ashore 10 nautical miles (19 km) east of Kolberg. She was on a voyage from Swinemünde to the Gulf of Bothnia. She broke up on 2 October.
Bethel	United Kingdom	The smack was severely damaged by fire at Lowestoft, Suffolk.
Fanny	Russia	The schooner ran aground on Saltholm, Denmark. She was on a voyage from Grimsby, Lincolnshire, United Kingdom to Kronstadt. She was refloated.
Louth	United Kingdom	The ship ran aground on the Goodwin Sands, Kent. She was refloated and taken in to Dover in a leaky condition.
Olga M.	Italy	The ship caught fire at "Kavak", Ottoman Empire and was scuttled. She was on a voyage from Taganrog to a British port. She was consequently condemned.
Prince de Galles	France	The ship was wrecked at "Amaracão, Brazil.
Tallula	United Kingdom	The ship was driven ashore on Double Island. She was on a voyage from Moulmein, Burma to Falmouth, Cornwall. She was refloated and put back to Moulmein, where she arrived on 3 October.

== 16 September ==
List of shipwrecks: 16 September 1871
Ship	State	Description
Angelique	Canada	The ship departed from the Delaware Capes, United States for Antwerp, Belgium. No further trace, presumed foundered with the loss of all hands.
Anna	United Kingdom	The brig was run into by the schooner Sirene (France) and sank at Mullion, Cornwall. Her crew were rescued.
Cynthia	United Kingdom	The brig was wrecked on Ailsa Craig, in the Firth of Forth. Her crew were rescued. She was on a voyage from Troon, Ayrshire to Dublin.
Hans	Germany	The brig collided with Zephyr (Germany) and sank off Anholt, Denmark. Her crew were rescued. Hans was on a voyage from Hull, Yorkshire, United Kingdom to Stettin.
Jeune Auguste	France	The ship foundered off Belle Île, Morbihan. Her crew were rescued.
Messenger	United Kingdom	The schooner was damaged by an onboard explosion at Sunderland, County Durham.
Nord	France	The steamship foundered 7 nautical miles (13 km) north west of the Les Hanois Lighthouse, Guernsey, Channel Islands. Her crew were rescued. She was on a voyage from Bordeaux, Gironde to Dunkirk, Nord.
Phersina	United Kingdom	The yacht was run down and sunk off Gorshill Point, Wigtownshire by the steamship Albion (United Kingdom). All five people on board were rescued by Albion. Phersina was on a voyage from the Clyde to Liverpool, Lancashire.
Robert	United Kingdom	The smack collided with the steamship Black Dwarf (United Kingdom) and sank in the Kyles of Bute. Her crew were rescued. Robert was on a voyage from Glasgow, Renfrewshire to Fort William, Inverness-shire.
Sublime	United Kingdom	The ship was abandoned at in the Atlantic Ocean. Her crew were rescued by Pride of England (United Kingdom). Sublime was on a voyage from Quebec City to Sunderland.
Triton	Norway	The barque was wrecked on the Blacktail Sand, in the Thames Estuary. She was on a voyage from a Baltic port to London, United Kingdom.
Ursa Major	United Kingdom	The steamship caught fire at Dieppe, Seine-Inférieure and was scuttled.
Unnamed	United Kingdom	A Mersey flat collided with the steamship Amelia (United Kingdom) and sank at Liverpool. She was refloated.

== 17 September ==
List of shipwrecks: September 1871
Ship	State	Description
Bouvet	French Navy	The sloop-of-war was wrecked on the La Folle Reef, off Aux Cayes, Haiti. Her crew were rescued.
Danube	United Kingdom	The steamship was damaged by fire. She was on a voyage from London to Singapore, Straits Settlements.
Lord Stanley	United Kingdom	The ship foundered in the Atlantic Ocean. Five of her sixteen crew were rescued by Norske Flag (Norway), the rest were presumed to have drowned, having refused to abandon ship. Lord Stanley was on a voyage from Liverpool to Gaspé, Quebec. She had been reported missing on 22 August.
Oromocto	United Kingdom	The barque foundered in the Atlantic Ocean in position 47.15°N 36.46°W with the loss of her captain and seven of her sixteen crew. She was on a voyage from Quebec City, Canada to Newcastle upon Tyne, Northumberland.
Phasina	United Kingdom	The schooner was run into by the steamship Albion (United Kingdom) and sank near Portpatrick, Wigtownshire. Her crew were rescued.
Samuel Hartley	United States	The schooner sank off LaHave, Nova Scotia, Canada. Her crew were rescued. She was on a voyage from Pictou, Nova Scotia to Galveston, Texas.
Triton	Norway	The barque ran aground on the Blacktail Sand, in the Thames Estuary. She was on a voyage from a Baltic port to London, United Kingdom.

== 18 September ==
List of shipwrecks: 18 September 1871
Ship	State	Description
Harlequin	United Kingdom	The steamship ran aground at Hellevoetsluis, Zeeland, Netherlands. She was on a voyage from Sunderland, County Durham to Rotterdam, South Holland, Netherlands. She was refloated.
Scawfell	United Kingdom	The ship caught fire in the Atlantic Ocean. She subsequently put in tob Saint Helena, where she was scuttled.

== 19 September ==
List of shipwrecks: 19 September 1871
Ship	State	Description
General Halkett	United Kingdom	The ship was wrecked at "Wardoe", Norway.
Johanne Antoinette	Norway	The ship was driven ashore at Dungeness, Kent, United Kingdom. She was on a voyage from Pori, Grand Duchy of Finland to Santander, Spain. She was refloated and towed in to Dover, Kent in a severely leaky condition.
Maria Elizabeth	Netherlands	The ship collided with Patriot (United Kingdom) and was run ashore at Hamra, Gotland, Sweden. Maria Elizabeth was on a voyage from Amsterdam, North Holland to Saint Petersburg, Russia. She was refloated with assistance from the steamship Neptune (Flag unknown).
Toy	United Kingdom	The fishing boat was run down and sunk in the English Channel by Hinde (United Kingdom) with the loss of a crew member.

== 20 September ==
List of shipwrecks: 20 September 1871
Ship	State	Description
British Lady	United Kingdom	The schooner was run into by the steamship Risca (United Kingdom) 2 nautical miles (3.7 km) off Porthcawl, Glamorgan and was severely damaged.
Falcon	United Kingdom	The ship was run into by the steamship Rotterdam (United Kingdom) at Harwich, Essex and was beached. She was on a voyage from Trondheim, Norway to Ipswich, Suffolk. Following temporary repairs, she was taken in to Ipswich for permanent repairs.
Henry	United Kingdom	The schooner was wrecked on Fisher's Island. Her six crew took to a boat; they were rescued by on 22 September by the schooner Regina (Norway). Henry was on a voyage from Arkhangelsk, Russia to Maryport, Cumberland.
Moultan	United Kingdom	The barque struck the Soldier's Rock, off Trinidad and sank. Her crew were rescued. She was on a voyage from Demerara, British Guiana to Trinidad.
Mushroom	United Kingdom	The steam wherry collided with the steamship Eagle (United Kingdom) and sank in the River Tees with the loss of two of her crew. She was on a voyage from Sunderland, County Durham to Middlesbrough, Yorkshire.

== 21 September ==
List of shipwrecks: 21 September 1871
Ship	State	Description
Adar	Austria-Hungary	The brig foundered off Malamocco, Italy. She was on a voyage from New York, United States to Venice, Italy.
George	Canada	The ship was wrecked near Western Bay, Newfoundland Colony. She was on a voyage from Harbour Grace, Nova Scotia to a port in Labrador, Newfoundland Colony.
Harmonie	Norway	The barque foundered in the Atlantic Ocean with the loss of two of her crew. Survivors were rescued by Nerio (United Kingdom). Harmonie was on a voyage from Bristol, Gloucestershire, United Kingdom to Quebec City Canada.
Lars Johann	Sweden	The schooner departed from Sandhamn for Amsterdam, North Holland, Netherlands. No further trace, presumed foundered with the loss of all hands.
Matilda	United Kingdom	The ship was driven ashore and wrecked at Yantai (Chefoo), China.
Prinsede Conde	France	The ship was driven ashore at Stanley, Falkland Islands. She was refloated on 25 September.

== 22 September ==
List of shipwrecks: 22 September 1871
Ship	State	Description
Abner Howes	United States	With a cargo of USD$3,000 worth of supplies aboard, the 70-foot (21 m), 65.10-gross register ton two-masted scow schooner dragged her anchor during a storm and was wrecked when she went ashore on rocks north of the north pier at Ahnapee, Wisconsin, at 44°36.549′N 087°25.805′W. She was a total loss.
Cambria	United Kingdom	The smack was driven ashore at Breaksea Point, Glamorgan. She had been refloated by 26 September.
Ceres	Netherlands	The ship was driven ashore on Saaremaa, Russia. Her crew were rescued. She was on a voyage from Saint Petersburg, Russia to a Dutch port.
Eliza	United Kingdom	The ship was driven ashore at Breaksea Point. She was on a voyage from Whitehaven, Cumberland to Newport, Monmouthshire. She had been refloated by 26 September.
Hermoder	Norway	The ship was driven ashore at West Wemyss, Fife, United Kingdom. She was on a voyage from West Wemyss to Christiania. She was refloated and taken in to Granton Lothian, United Kingdom in a severely leaky condition.
Johann	Germany	The ship was wrecked near Lemvig, Denmark. She was on a voyage from Burntisland, Fife to Schleswig-Holstein.
Lafayette	France	The steamship was gutted by fire at Havre de Grâce, Seine-Inférieure. She was on a voyage from New York to Havre de Grâce.
Norton	United Kingdom	The steamship was sighted off Gibraltar whilst on a voyage from Brăila, Ottoman Empire to a British port. No further trace, presumed foundered with the loss of all hands.
Punch	United Kingdom	The ship was driven ashore at Breaksea Point. She had been refloated by 26 September.
Rosalie	France	The ship ran aground in the "Fourricareah River". She was on a voyage from Sierra Leone to Marseille, Bouches-du-Rhône. She was refloated and put back to Sierra Leone, where she was condemned.
Sarah	United Kingdom	The ship was driven ashore at Breaksea Point. She had been refloated by 26 September.
Sarah and Mary	United Kingdom	The ship was driven ashore at Breaksea Point. She was on a voyage from Glasgow, Renfrewshire to Gloucester. She was refloated and towed in to Cardiff, Glamorgan.
Taeping	China	The ship was wrecked on the Hodd Reef or the Ladd Reef. Her crew took to three boats. Those in one of the boats reached Batavia, Netherlands East Indies; the others were reported rescued by Omer and Julie and Serica (both Flag unknown). Taeping was on a voyage from Amoy to New York, United States.
Young Margaret	United Kingdom	The pilot boat was driven ashore at Breaksea Point. She had been refloated by 26 September.
Unnamed	Germany	A koff was driven ashore on Borkum.

== 23 September ==
List of shipwrecks: 23 September 1871
Ship	State	Description
Ankjer	Russia	The ship was wrecked at Thisted, Denmark. Her crew were rescued. She was on a voyage from Newcastle upon Tyne, Northumberland, United Kingdom to Saint Petersburg.
Charlotte Haye	Denmark	The ship was driven ashore on Læsø.
Glasgow Packet	United Kingdom	The ship was abandoned in The Downs. Her crew were rescued. She was on a voyage from West Hartlepool, County Durham to Harfleur, Seine-Inférieure. She came ashore at St. Margaret's Bay, Kent and was wrecked.
Isabella	United Kingdom	The ship departed from King's Lynn, Norfolk for Dunkirk, Nord, France. No further trace, presumed foundered with the loss of all hands.
Lafayette	France	Lafayette The steamship was damaged by fire at Havre de Grâce, Seine-Inférieure.
Mary Catherine	Netherlands	The ship ran aground on the Bokkengat. She was on a voyage from Galaţi, Ottoman Empire to Rotterdam, South Holland. She was refloated and taken in to Goeree, Zeeland in a leaky condition.
Penman Castle	United Kingdom	The schooner was driven ashore and wrecked at Goswick, Northumberland. She was on a voyage from North Sunderland, County Durham to Berwick upon Tweed, Northumberland.

== 24 September ==
List of shipwrecks: 24 September 1871
Ship	State	Description
Felix	Germany	The ship was driven ashore at Hartlepool, County Durham, United Kingdom. Her crew were rescued by rocket apparatus.
F. H. Lolling	Germany	The brig capsized at Bremerhaven.
Sarah and Martha	United Kingdom	The ship was wrecked on the Longsand, in the North Sea off the coast of Essex. Her crew were rescued. She was on a voyage from Par, Cornwall to Hull, Yorkshire.
Triumph	United Kingdom	The whaler, a schooner, ran aground in the Lochy River at Fort William, Inverness-shire.
Viga	Germany	The schooner was wrecked at Grindavík, Iceland. Her crew were rescued.
Wivi	(Russian Empire) Grand Duchy of Finland	The sloop foundered in the Baltic Sea. Her seventeen crew were rescued by Lizzy (Norway). Wivi was on a voyage from Kaskinen to Gävle, Sweden.

== 25 September ==
List of shipwrecks: 25 September 1871
Ship	State	Description
Aline	Germany	The ship was driven ashore at Kiel.
Bee	United Kingdom	The sloop foundered in the North Sea 12 nautical miles (22 km) off Hunstanton, Norfolk. Her crew were rescued. She was on a voyage from Ipswich, Suffolk to Driffield, Yorkshire.
Benjamin	United Kingdom	The brigantine ran aground on the Roger Sand, in the Lynn Deeps. She was on a voyage from Kristiansand, Norway to Brest, Finistère. She was refloated and taken in to King's Lynn, Norfolk in a waterlogged condition.
Brunig	Switzerland	The steamship was run into by the steamship La Suisse (Switzerland) and sank in Lake Lucerne off with the loss of three of her twenty passengers. Brunig was on a voyage from Lucerne to Küssnacht am Rigi.
Catharina	Germany	The schooner was wrecked on Scharhörn. She was on a voyage from Puerto Plata, Dominican Republic to Hamburg. She was later refloated and taken in to Hamburg.
Christine	Netherlands	The schooner was wrecked on Rømø, Denmark. She was on a voyage from Newcastle upon Tyne, Northumberland, United Kingdom to Riga, Russia.
Hendrika	Netherlands	The galiot was wrecked on Schiermonnikoog, Friesland. She was on a voyage from Newcastle upon Tyne to Groningen.
Henriette	Germany	The ship was driven ashore at Kiel.
Hercules	Germany	The ship was wrecked on Spiekeroog with the loss of five of her six crew. She was on a voyage from Carolinensiel to the Weser.
Hydrabad	United Kingdom	The ship ran aground in the Eure.
John and Christiania	United Kingdom	The smack foundered at Coverack, Cornwall. Her crew were rescued.
Lyon	United Kingdom	The smack was driven ashore and wrecked at Porthallow, Cornwall. Her crew were rescued.
Sarah Martha	United Kingdom	The ship was wrecked on the Longsand, in the North Sea off the coast of Essex. She was on a voyage from Par, Cornwall to Hull, Yorkshire.
Theodor	Germany	The ship was driven ashore at Kiel.
Underley	United Kingdom	The full-rigged ship ran aground and was wrecked between Monk's Bay and Steel Bay, Isle of Wight with the loss of one life. Survivors were rescued by the Coastguard using rocket apparatus. She was on a voyage from London to Melbourne, Victoria .
Unnamed	Flag unknown	A ship was wrecked on Spiekeroog with the loss of all hands.

== 26 September ==
List of shipwrecks: 26 September 1871
Ship	State	Description
Asia	United Kingdom	The brig was wrecked on Borkum, Germany with the loss of three of her eight crew.
Ava	United Kingdom	The ship was driven ashore and wrecked at the Landguard Fort, Felixtowe, Suffolk. She was on a voyage from Calais, France to West Hartlepool, County Durham.
Branstons	United Kingdom	The brig foundered in the North Sea. Her crew were rescued. She was on a voyage from London to Hamburg.
Eleanor	United Kingdom	The steamship departed from Gibraltar for Falmouth, Cornwall. Subsequently foundered with the loss of all hands.
George H. Oulton	Canada	The ship departed from New York, United States for Dunkirk, Nord, France. No further trace, presumed foundered with the loss of all hands.
Ida Elise	Germany	The ship was driven ashore on Juist. Her crew were rescued. She was on a voyage from a Scottish port to Grohn.
James Booth	United Kingdom	The barque foundered in the Bay of Biscay with the loss of all but one of her sixteen crew. The survivor was rescued the next day by the schooner Royal Tar (United Kingdom). James Booth was on a voyage from Newcastle upon Tyne, Northumberland to Genoa, Italy.
Scotia	United Kingdom	The steamship was driven ashore at Blackhead, County Antrim and sank at the stern. She was on a voyage from Belfast to Red Bay, County Antrim. She subsequently broke up and was a total loss.

== 27 September ==
List of shipwrecks: 27 September 1871
Ship	State	Description
Cyrus	United Kingdom	The brigantine or schooner was driven ashore and severely damaged outside the east pier at Rye, Sussex harbour, when arriving with coal. Her crew were rescued by the Rye lifeboat Arthur Frederick ( RNLI). She was refloated and taken into Rye on 16 October.
George	United Kingdom	The tug collided with the paddle tug Great Emperor (United Kingdom) and sank in the North Sea 50 nautical miles (93 km) off South Shields, County Durham. Her crew were rescued by Great Emperor.
Jacob Bernardus	Netherlands	The ship ran aground on the Haaks Bank, in the North Sea off the Dutch coast. She was refloated and towed in to Hellevoetsluis, Zeeland in a leaky condition.
Johan Carl	Germany	The brig was abandoned in the North Sea. Her crew were rescued.
Manly	United Kingdom	The brig was wrecked at Drogheda, County Louth with the loss of six of her seven crew. She was on a voyage from Newport, Monmouthshire to Dublin.
Marthe	France	The schooner ran aground on the Longsand, in the North Sea off the coast of Essex, United Kingdom. She was on a voyage from "Lacgaille" to Caen, Calvados. She was refloated and assisted in to Sheerness, Kent, United Kingdom in a waterlogged condition.
Minerva	United Kingdom	The steamship ran aground in the River Avon under the Clifton Suspension Bridge. She was on a voyage from Patras, Greece to Bristol, Gloucestershire. She was refloated the next day and taken in to Bristol.
Navigator	Germany	The ship was driven ashore near Seaton Carew, county Durham, United Kingdom. She was on a voyage from Delfzijl, Groningen, Netherlands to Middlesbrough, Yorkshire, United Kingdom.
Sprightly	United Kingdom	The brig foundered off Drogheda, County Louth, United Kingdom with the loss of all five of her six crew.
Stella	Netherlands	The ship was driven ashore and wrecked at Loosduinen, South Holland. She was on a voyage from Saint Petersburg, Russia to Schiedam, South Holland.

== 28 September ==
List of shipwrecks: 28 September 1871
Ship	State	Description
Albert	Germany	The ship was driven ashore at "Eitzenloch". She was on a voyage from Havre de Grâce, Seine-Inférieure, France to Hamburg.
Alert	United Kingdom	The brig was abandoned in the North Sea. Her crew were rescued. She was on a voyage from Sunderland, County Durham to Aarhus, Denmark.
Carl Matthias	Germany	The ship was wrecked on the coast of Tabasco, Mexico.
Due Fratelli	Italy	The ship was abandoned in a waterlogged condition. Her crew were rescued by Ellen Widdup (United Kingdom). Due Fratelli was on a voyage from Kronstadt, Russia to Naples. She was subsequently towed in to the Isles of Scilly, United Kingdom.
Gresham	United Kingdom	The ship was driven ashore and wrecked at Dungeness Kent. She was on a voyage from Demerara, British Guiana to London.
Harmine	Germany	The brigantine was driven ashore near St. Agnes, Cornwall, United Kingdom. Her crew were rescued. She was on a voyage from Cardiff, Glamorgan, United Kingdom to Bremen.
Magnet	United Kingdom	The ship was driven ashore and wrecked at Conway, Caernarfonshire. Her crew were rescued. She was on a voyage from Runcorn, Cheshire to Bray, County Wicklow.
Maria	Spain	The barque was driven ashore at Santa Ana.
Vine	United Kingdom	The schooner ran aground at Thurso, Caithness. Her crew were rescued by rocket apparatus.
Unnamed	Flag unknown	A schooner ran aground on the Brake Sand.

== 29 September ==
List of shipwrecks: 29 September 1871
Ship	State	Description
Albert	Netherlands	The ship was driven ashore near Boulogne, Pas-de-Calais, France. Her crew were rescued. She was on a voyage from Newcastle upon Tyne, Northumberland, United Kingdom to Genoa, Italy.
Almaria Maria	United Kingdom	The ship ran aground in the Paraná River. She was refloated and taken in to Buenos Aires, Argentina.
Balaklava	United Kingdom	The barque foundered in the Atlantic Ocean. Her crew were rescued by the barque Rio de Plata (Spain). Balaklava was on a voyage from London to Miramichi, New Brunswick, Canada.
Fairy Dell	United Kingdom	The steamship foundered in the North Sea off the mouth of the Humber with the loss of seven of her twelve crew. Survivors were rescued by the fishing boat Black-eyed Susan (United Kingdom). Fairy Dell was on her maiden voyage, from Sunderland, County Durham to Rochester, Kent.
Friendship	United Kingdom	The schooner caught fire at Southampton, Hampshire and was scuttled. She was on a voyage from Clackmannan to Southampton.
Hepburn Hall	United Kingdom	The steamship was driven ashore on Imbros, Ottoman Empire. She was on a voyage from Antwerp, Belgium to Enos, Ottoman Empire. She was refloated on 2 October.
Mary Kate	United Kingdom	The ship sprang a leak and was beached at Malahide, County Dublin. She was on a voyage from Troon, Ayrshire to Briton Ferry, Glamorgan. She was refloated on 19 October and taken in to the Carlingford Lough, where she was beached for repairs.
Osprey	United Kingdom	The yacht capsized at Liverpool, Lancashire and was severely damaged.
Pioneer	United Kingdom	The steamship was abandoned in the Atlantic Ocean 200 nautical miles (370 km) south west of the Isles of Scilly. Her crew survived. She was on a voyage from Falmouth, Cornwall to Odesa, Russia.
Queenstown	United Kingdom	The brig foundered in the Atlantic Ocean. Her crew were rescued by Gustav Wasa (Sweden). Queenstown was on a voyage from Faial Island, Azores to Hamburg, Germany.
Susannah	United Kingdom	The wherry foundered 1 nautical mile (1.9 km) off Hartlepool, County Durham. Both crew were rescued by the tug Contest (United Kingdom), which was towing Susannah from the River Tyne to Middlesbrough, Yorkshire.
Tre Sorrelle	Italy	The barque was driven ashore and wrecked at Donna Nook, Lincolnshire, United Kingdom with the loss of nine of the fifteen people on board. Survivors were rescued by the Donna Nook Lifeboat. She was on a voyage from Taganrog, Russia to Hull, Yorkshire.

== 30 September ==
List of shipwrecks: 30 September 1871
Ship	State	Description
Alfred	United Kingdom	The schooner was driven ashore. She was on a voyage from Wick, Caithness to Limerick. she was refloated and taken in to Belfast, County Antrim in a leaky condition.
Ann	United Kingdom	The ship was driven ashore at Hunstanton, Norfolk.
Ceres	United Kingdom	The ship was driven ashore and wrecked at "Nare Point". Her crew were rescued. she was on a voyage from Neath, Glamorgan to Gweek, Cornwall.
Commerce	United Kingdom	The derelict schooner was driven ashore near Wells-next-the-Sea, Norfolk.
Corinne	United Kingdom	The ship capsized and sank on the Black Buoy Sand, in the North Sea off the coast of Lincolnshire with the loss of two of her crew. She was refloated on 13 October.
Elizabeth	United Kingdom	The ship ran aground on the Brake Sand. She was on a voyage from South Shields, County Durham to Teignmouth, Devon. She was refloated and taken in to Ramsgate, Kent in a leaky condition.
Ellen Morris	United Kingdom	The ship was wrecked off Anrum, Germany. Her crew were rescued. She was on a voyage from Portmadoc, Caernarfonshire to Hamburg, Germany.
James	United Kingdom	The brig was wrecked on the Knock Sand. Her crew took to a boat and landed at Wainfleet, Lincolnshire.
Levant	United Kingdom	The full-rigged ship ran aground on the Outer Dowsing Sandbank, in the North Sea off the coast of Norfolk. Her 25 crew were rescued by Anne and Jane (United Kingdom). Levant was on a voyage from South Shields to Port Said, Egypt. She was refloated the next day and taken in tow by three fishing smacks but foundered 2 nautical miles (3.7 km) west south west of the Outer Dowsing Lightship ( Trinity House).
Major	United Kingdom	The schooner was driven ashore near Holme-next-the-Sea, Norfolk. Her four crew were rescued by the Hunstanton Lifeboat Licensed Victualler ( Royal National Lifeboat Institution). Major was on a voyage from London to Goole, Yorkshire. She was refloated and resumed her voyage.
Maria and Isabella	United Kingdom	The fishing smack was run down and sunk in the North Sea by a barque with the loss of four of her six crew. Survivors were rescued by the barque.
Mary Chorley	United Kingdom	The brig was driven ashore and wrecked at "Lerna", near A Coruña, Spain. She was on a voyage from Llanelly, Glamorgan to Barcelona, Spain.
Mystery	United Kingdom	The schooner was driven ashore and wrecked at Burnham Overy Staithe, Norfolk. Her crew were rescued.
Nordstjern	Germany	The steamship was wrecked on the Jade Platte, in the North Sea off the German coast. Her crew were rescued. She was on a voyage from Gothenburg, Sweden to Bremen.
Novelty	United Kingdom	The brigantine was driven ashore on Muck Island, in the Larne Lough.
Orb	United Kingdom	The brig ran aground on the Knock Sand, in the North Sea off the coast of Lincolnshire. Her seven crew were rescued by the Donna Nook Lifeboat Herbert Ingram ( Royal National Lifeboat Institution). Orb floated off and was taken in to the Boston Deeps by Herbert Ingram.
Ouse	United Kingdom	The ship was driven ashore at Sutton-on-Sea, Lincolnshire. She was on a voyage from Teignmouth to Hull, Yorkshire.
Papenburg	Germany	The barque was driven ashore east of Blakeney, Norfolk, United Kingdom. She was on a voyage from Riga, Russia to Saint-Malo, Ille-et-Vilaine, France.
Regina	United Kingdom	The brig was abandoned in the North Sea off the coast of Lincolnshire. Her seven crew were rescued by the Donna Nook Lifeboat Herbert Ingram ( Royal National Lifeboat Institution). Regina came ashore at Skegness. She was refloated on 5 October and towed in to Grimsby.
Sarah	United Kingdom	The brig foundered in the North Sea 45 nautical miles (83 km) off the "Schouwen Lighthouse", Zeeland Netherlands. Her crew were rescued by the schooner Lloyd's (Norway) was on a voyage from Sunderland, County Durham to Rotterdam, South Holland, Netherlands.
Stradella	Germany	The ship was driven from her mooring and sank at Wisbech, Cambridgeshire, United Kingdom. She was on a voyage from Wisbech to Copenhagen, Denmark. She was refloated on 27 October and towed in to Wisbech.

== Unknown date ==
List of shipwrecks: Unknown date in September 1871
Ship	State	Description
Aæltje	Netherlands	The ship foundered. She was on a voyage from Texel, North Holland to Fredrikstad, Denmark.
Agnes	France	The schooner ran aground and was wrecked at Martinique.
Alida Bergman	Germany	The ship was wrecked on Ameland, Friesland, Netherlands. She was on a voyage from Papenburg to Memel.
Alma	Canada Canada	The brigantine was driven ashore and wrecked on Isle Madame, Nova Scotia before 16 September.
Alma	United Kingdom	The barque ran aground on the Maplin Sand, in the North Sea off the coast of Essex She was refloated and resumed her voyage.
Amphion	United Kingdom	The ship was wrecked on the Swedish coast. She was on a voyage from Oulu, Grand Duchy of Finland to Liverpool, Lancashire. She was refloated in mid-October.
Annie Sise	United States	The ship was wrecked at Point Reyes, California. She was on a voyage from Sydney, New South Wales to San Francisco, California.
Areta	Malta	The ship was driven ashore on Borkum, Germany. She was refloated.
Aukjen	Flag unknown	The koff was wrecked at Thisted, Denmark. She was on a voyage from Newcastle upon Tyne, Northumberland, United Kingdom to Saint Petersburg, Russia.
Beau Ideal	United Kingdom	The ship was wrecked at Elephant Point. She was on a voyage from Sunderland, County Durham to Rangoon, Burma.
Bernardine	Sweden	The schooner was wrecked on the Haaks Bank, in the North Sea off the coast of Zeeland, Netherlands. Her crew were rescued. She was on a voyage from Riga, Russia to Schiedam, South Holland, Netherlands.
Beta Heise	Flag unknown	The ship was driven ashore at Maracaibo, Venezuela. She was refloated.
Bloomer	United Kingdom	The ship foundered. She was on a voyage from Texel to Fredrikstad.
Bostonian	United States	The ship was wrecked. She was on a voyage from Matanzas, Cuba to California.
Britannia	United Kingdom	The tug ran aground at Fraserburgh, Aberdeenshire and was holed.
Busy Bee	United Kingdom	The steamship was driven ashore in the Danube at Gorgova, Ottoman Empire.
Calypso	United Kingdom	The ship foundered in the Atlantic Ocean in late September. Her crew were rescued. She was on a voyage from Saint John, New Brunswick, Canada to Cardiff, Glamorgan.
Capel	United Kingdom	The brig capsized in the Baltic Sea before 11 September.
Chance	United Kingdom	The ship was driven ashore between "Bendoo" and "Moccolo". She was on a voyage from Liverpool to Sherbro Island, Sierra Leone.
Charlotte Hodge	Norway	The ship was driven ashore on Læsø, Denmark. She was on a voyage from Malmö, Sweden to Rio de Janeiro, Brazil.
Charmer	United States	The ship ran aground at Quebec City, Canada.
Cingala	United Kingdom	The ship was wrecked on the west coast of Panay, Spanish East Indies. She was on a voyage from Hong Kong to New York, United States.
Commerce	France	The schooner was wrecked at "Melinterano", on the west coast of Africa. She was on a voyage from Nosy Be, Mozambique to Marseille, Bouches-du-Rhône.
D. M. Richards	United Kingdom	The ship was wrecked at Fernando Po, Spanish Guinea. She was on a voyage from Bonny, Africa to Liverpool.
Dos Hermanos	Spain	The schooner was driven ashore at Puerto de Los Christianos, Teneriffe, Canary Islands. She was on a voyage from Santa Cruz de Tenerife to "Orotava".
Ecliptic	United Kingdom	The ship collided with Petropavlovsk (Imperial Russian Navy) before 16 September. She was on a voyage from Pärnu, Russia to Dundee, Forfarshire. She was taken in to Reval, Russia, where she was repaired.
Edward Everett	United States	The ship was wrecked on Salt Cay, Turks Islands. She was on a voyage from Mayagüez, Puerto Rico to the Turks Islands.
Eisnieur	United States	The fishing schooner went ashore at Argyle. She was got off and repaired, but subsequently burned on her passage home.
Elena	Italy	The ship was wrecked at the mouth of the Piave. She was on a voyage from "Catacola" to Trieste.
Eliza	United Kingdom	The ship brig wrecked on Bornholm, Denmark. Her crew were rescued. She was on a voyage from Swinemünde, Germany to Gävle, Sweden.
Eliza	Germany	The schooner was wrecked north of the mouth of the Rio Grande. She was on a voyage from Penguin Island, Patagonia, Argentina to Liverpool.
Eliza	United Kingdom	The ship collided with the steamship Sperber (United Kingdom) and was beached at Greenwich, Kent. She was on a voyage from London to Chichester, Sussex.
Elizabeth Douthwaite	United Kingdom	The ship ran aground at Yenikale, Russia.
Eros	Norway	The brig was driven ashore at Hittarp, Sweden. She was refloated and towed in to Helsingør, Denmark.
Espoir	France	The ship was driven ashore near Boulogne, Pas-de-Calais. She was on a voyage from "Aux Habers" to Dunkirk, Nord.
Eugenie	France	The barque was abandoned in the Atlantic Ocean. Her crew were rescued. She was on a voyage from Rio de Janeiro to Whydah, Africa.
Filomena	Italy	The ship capsized in the Malta Channel. She was on a voyage from Malta to Sicily. She was towed in to Constantinople, Ottoman Empire by the barque Ricardo (Italy.
Flower of Enzie	United Kingdom	The schooner was driven ashore near Peterhead, Aberdeenshire and was severely damaged.
Gertjelina	Netherlands	The ship was wrecked on the Borkummer Reef. She was on a voyage from Flensburg, Germany to Zwolle, Overijssel.
Gesine Johanna	Germany	The galiot was abandoned in a sinking condition. She was on a voyage from Hamburg to Bremen.
Hamlet	United Kingdom	The ship was wrecked with some loss of life.
Hilda	Germany	The ship was wrecked in the St. Augustine Inlet. She was on a voyage from New Orleans, Louisiana, United States to Bremen.
Ida E.	Canada	The schooner was wrecked at Chatham, New Brunswick before 23 September. She was on a voyage from Halifax, Nova Scotia to Campbeltown, New Brunswick.
Iona	United Kingdom	The ship was driven ashore near Danzig, Germany. She was on a voyage from Wick, Caithness to Danzig. She was refloated and taken in to Danzig.
Italia	Italy	The ship was lost in the Le Maire Strait. She was on a voyage from Rio de Janeiro, Brazil to Callao, Peru.
Jacobine Marice	Denmark	The ship was abandoned in the North Sea. Her crew were rescued. She was on a voyage from Svendborg to Newcastle upon Tyne.
James	United Kingdom	The ship foundered in the North Sea. Her crew were rescued. She was on a voyage from Lowestoft, Suffolk to Antwerp, Belgium.
Jantina	Netherlands	The ship ran aground on the Filsummerwad. She was on a voyage from Delfzijl, Groningen to Norwich, Norfolk, United Kingdom.
Jean	France	The brig struck a sunken wreck between the Longships Lighthouse and the Wolf Rock, Cornwall, United Kingdom and foundered with the loss of two of her crew.
Johann	Germany	The ship was wrecked near Lemvig, Denmark. She was on a voyage from Burntisland, Fife, United Kingdom to a port in Schleswig.
Julia Karney	United States	The brigantine was abandoned at sea. She was discovered by the steamship Tyne (United Kingdom) and towed in to Saint Thomas, Virgin Islands.
Konrad	(Russian Empire) Grand Duchy of Finland	The schooner was driven ashore at Dragør, Denmark. She was on a voyage from Kiel, Germany to Öland, Sweden.
Lady Gertrude	United Kingdom	The ship put in to Rio de Janeiro, Brazil on fire and was scuttled. She was on a voyage from Leith to the River Plate.
Leda	United Kingdom	The brig was wrecked on the Kopparstena, in the Baltic Sea with the loss of a crew member. Survivors were rescued by the brig St. Olaf (Norway). Leda was on a voyage from Whitby, Yorkshire to Stockholm, Sweden.
HMS Leven	Royal Navy	The Algerine-class gunboat ran aground on the Bluff Rock, off Yantai (Chefoo), China.
Litka	United States	The ship was wrecked at Nassau, Bahamas. She was on a voyage from New York to Havre de Grâce, Seine-Inférieure, France.
Livonia	United Kingdom	The ship ran aground at Dundee, Forfarshire.
Louis	Netherlands	The ship ran aground in the Loan. She was on a voyage from Riga to Amsterdam. She was refloated and towed in to the Nieuw Diep.
Lucibelle	United Kingdom	The ship .
Margaretha	Germany	The ship ran aground in St. Johns River. She was on a voyage from Laguna to Hamburg.
Maria	France	The ship ran aground on the St. Lucien Bank, off Montevideo, Uruguay. She was on a voyage from Buenos Aires, Argentina to Marseille.
Mary	United Kingdom	The ship was abandoned in the Atlantic Ocean. Her crew were rescued by Annie Storey (United Kingdom. Mary was on a voyage from Bakers Island, Massachusetts, United States to Sunderland, County Durham.
Max	Germany	The schooner was driven ashore at Saint Thomas, Virgin Islands. She was refloated.
Mina	United Kingdom	The ship was driven ashore on the east coast of Öland. She was on a voyage from Stockholm to Stettin, Germany.
Minx	Leeward Islands	The schooner was wrecked in Sasoye Bay, Dominica.
Mongyno	China	The ship was lost whilst on a voyage from Rangoon to Foo Chow Foo.
Monte Sinai	Italy	The ship was destroyed by fire. She was on a voyage from Genoa to New York.
Nelson	United Kingdom	The ship was driven ashore in Trinity Bay. She was on a voyage from Liverpool to Quebec City.
Nina Becker	Germany	The ship was driven ashore on the east coast of Öland. She was on a voyage from Stockholm to Stettin.
Notre Dame de Bon Port	France	The barque was destroyed by fire at sea before 22 September. Her crew were rescued by Emilio Barabino (Italy). Notre Dame de Bon Port was on a voyage from London, United Kingdom to Montevideo.
Onni	Norway	The ship was driven ashore at Kårhamn.
Paul	United Kingdom	The ship foundered off the north coast of Spain. Six crew survived. She was on a voyage from Bilbao, Spain to Middlesbrough, Yorkshire.
Prairie Flower	United Kingdom	The ship was wrecked near "Tudy". Her crew were rescued. She was on a voyage from "Tudy Island" to Guernsey, Channel Islands.
Prinz Adalbert	Russia	The ship was driven ashore on "Wrangelsholm", in the Baltic Sea. She was on a voyage from Cyprus to Saint Petersburg. She was refloated and put in to Reval in a leaky condition.
Puebla	French Navy	The gunboat was wrecked on the coast of Seine-Inférieure. She was on a voyage from Paris to Cherbourg, Seine-Inférieure.
Providentia	Germany	The ship was wrecked at "Karingou".
River Forth	United Kingdom	The barque foundered in the Atlantic Ocean.
Roman	Netherlands	The steamship ran aground. She was on a voyage from New York to Helsingør. She was refloated and taken in to Helsingør.
Rosario	France	The ship was lost.
Ryoun Maru	Japan	The steamship was wrecked at "Hika Sima". All on board were rescued.
S. and W. Welsh	United States	The brig was driven ashore and wrecked 15 nautical miles (28 km) south of Cape Canaveral, Florida with the loss of her captain.
Satellite	United States	The ship ran aground at Quebec City.
Saum	Germany	The galliot was driven ashore on Heligoland.
Seraphine	France	The schooner was wrecked on the Swedish coast. Two crew survived, the rest were reported missing, haven taken to a boat which was blown out to sea. She was on a voyage from Newcastle upon Tyne to Gävle.
Sirius	France	The ship was driven ashore near Strömstad, Norway.
Sjofna	Norway	The barque was driven ashore on Skagen, Denmark. She was on a voyage from a Dutch port to Söderhamn, Sweden.
Sjomanden	Flag unknown	The ship ran aground on the Englishman's Shoal, in the Bosphorus. She was later refloated.
Sterckel	Russia	The coaster was driven ashore on Naissaar. She was on a voyage from Saint Petersburg to "Dogme".
St. Lawrence	Germany	The ship was lost in the Turks Islands. She was on a voyage from Bremen to New Orleans.
Topaz	United Kingdom	The steam lighter was damaged by fire at South Shields, County Durham.
Transit	United States	The barque foundered off Paraíba, Brazil. She was on a voyage from St. Mary's to Montevideo.
Vedette	French Navy	The gunboat was wrecked on the cost of Seine-Inférieure. She was on a voyage from Paris to Cherbourg.
Venetiam	United Kingdom	The steamship ran aground on the Meloria Bank, in the Mediterranean Sea.
Veronica	United Kingdom	The ship foundered in the North Sea. Her crew were rescued by a French lugger. She was on a voyage from Hartlepool, County Durham to Wilhelmshaven, Germany.
Volador	United Kingdom	The ship was wrecked in the Korea Strait.
Walbroti	Canada	The sloop was destroyed by fire.
Westmoreland	United Kingdom	The ship was driven ashore and wrecked on the east coast of Öland.
William Shaw	United Kingdom	The ship was driven ashore in the Maputo River before 20 September. Her crew were rescued.
Zeemeeuw	United Kingdom	The ship was driven ashore on Gotland, Sweden. She was on a voyage from Saint Petersburg to Amsterdam, North Holland. She was refloated and taken in to Kalmar, Sweden in a severely leaky condition.
