= List of shipwrecks in August 1886 =

The list of shipwrecks in August 1886 includes ships sunk, foundered, grounded, or otherwise lost during August 1886.

== 1 August ==
List of shipwrecks: 1 August 1886
Ship	State	Description
Adieu	United Kingdom	The ship ran aground on the West Hoyle Bank, in Liverpool Bay. She was refloated with the assistance of lifeboats and assisted in to Hoylake, Cheshire.
Mary Elizabeth	United Kingdom	The ship was run down and sunk in the Firth of Forth 35 nautical miles (65 km) east of the Isle of May, Fife by the ketch Labora et Ora (Norway).
Mersey	United Kingdom	The steamship ran aground off Penrhos Point, Anglesey and sank. Her crew survived. She was on a voyage from Newport, Monmouthshire to Liverpool, Lancashire.

== 2 August ==
List of shipwrecks: 2 August 1886
Ship	State	Description
Daring	United Kingdom	The smack caught fire and sank off the Lemon and Ore Lightship ( Trinity House). Her crew were rescued by the smack Pearch (United Kingdom).

== 8 August ==
List of shipwrecks: 8 August 1886
Ship	State	Description
Acolus	United Kingdom	The steamship collided with the steamship Valetta (United Kingdom) and sank off Padstow, Cornwall. Her crew were rescued.

== 9 August ==
List of shipwrecks: 9 August 1886
Ship	State	Description
Sunflower	United Kingdom	The fishing smack collided with the steamship Gellert (Germany) and sank in the North Sea. Her crew were rescued by Gellert.

== 12 August ==
List of shipwrecks: 12 August 1886
Ship	State	Description
Acton	United Kingdom	The steamship was driven ashore and wrecked 3 nautical miles (5.6 km) west of Cape Pine, Newfoundland Colony. She was on a voyage from Montreal, Quebec, Canada to London.

== 13 August ==
List of shipwrecks: 13 August 1886
Ship	State	Description
C. H. S.	United Kingdom	The brigantine was run into by the steamship Nerissa (Germany) at Blackwall, Middlesex and was severely damaged.
Religione e Liberta	Italy	The barque arrived at Savona on fire. She was on a voyage from Sunderland, County Durham, United Kingdom to Savona.
Ryfylke	Norway	The crewless schooner capsized at St. Ubes, Portugal.

== 16 August ==
List of shipwrecks: 16 August 1886
Ship	State	Description
Ceylon	United Kingdom	The steamship ran aground at Saint Petersburg, Russia. She was refloated on 19 August with the assistance of six tugs.
Envoy	Siam	The barque ran aground and was wrecked. Six of her crew reached "Ying Pin", China on wreckage from the ship on 24 August. The fate of the other 32 people on board was unknown. She was on a voyage from Amoy to Shanghai, China.

== 18 August ==
List of shipwrecks: 18 August 1886
Ship	State	Description
Houghton	United Kingdom	The steamship collided with the steamship J. M. Strachan (United Kingdom) and sank in the North Sea. Houghton was on a voyage from Sunderland, County Durham to Dieppe, Seine-Inférieure, France.
Triune	United Kingdom	The ship was lost on this date.

== 19 August ==
List of shipwrecks: 19 August 1886
Ship	State	Description
Benjamin	United Kingdom	The brigantine sprang a leak and foundered 3 nautical miles (5.6 km) north east by east of Sandlemere, Yorkshire.
Constance	United Kingdom	The ship ran aground in the River Mersey near Runcorn, Cheshire. She was on a voyage from Runcorn to Newcastle upon Tyne, Northumberland. She was refloated and taken in to Liverpool, Lancashire.

== 20 August ==
List of shipwrecks: 20 August 1886
Ship	State	Description
Ceto	United Kingdom	The ship collided with the steamship Lebanon and sank in the North Sea. All 35 people on board were rescued by Lebanon.
Jane Sophia	United Kingdom	The schooner collided with the steamship Zenobia (United Kingdom) and sank near the Seven Stones Reef, Cornwall. Her crew were rescued by Zenobia. Jane Sophia was on a voyage from Plymouth, Devon to Liverpool, Lancashire.
Marie	United Kingdom	The sloop collided with the steamship Sailor Prince (United Kingdom) and sank off the Trindelen Lightship (Denmark) with the loss of one of the four people on board. Survivors were rescued by Sailor Prince. Marie was on a voyage from Veile, Denmark to Stavanger.
Sandal	United Kingdom	The steamship ran aground on the Kentish Knock. She was reflaoted and resumed her voyage.
Unnamed	United Kingdom	The fishing boat collided with Ceto and sank in the North Sea off Whitby. Her crew were rescued by Ceto.

== 21 August ==
List of shipwrecks: 21 August 1886
Ship	State	Description
Arabella	United Kingdom	The barque was driven onto a reef and sank at Savanna-la-Mar, Jamaica. Her ten crew survivedc.

== 22 August ==
List of shipwrecks: 22 August 1886
Ship	State	Description
Joseph Ferens	United Kingdom	The steamship ran aground and was wrecked 10 nautical miles (19 km) from Cape St. Vincent, Portugal. Her crew survived. She was on a voyage from Newport, Monmouthshire to Palermo, Sicily, italy.

== 23 August ==
List of shipwrecks: 23 August 1886
Ship	State	Description
Enid	United Kingdom	The barque was driven ashore on Cayo Fragoso, Cuba. She was refloated in mid-September.
Glynne	United Kingdom	The schooner ran aground on the Bishop Rock, Cornwall. She was on a voyage from Swansea, Glamorgan to Douglas, Isle of Man. She floated off, and was towed in to Milford Haven, Pembrokeshire by the steamship West Cumberland (United Kingdom).
Howard	United States	The schooner was wrecked at Portugal Cove, Newfoundland Colony. Her crew were rescued.
Isabel	United Kingdom	The yacht collided with the steamship Islay (United Kingdom) and sank off the Mull of Kintyre, Argyllshire. All on board were rescued.
Isabel	Canada	The barque was destroyed by fire at Lobos Island, Uruguay. Her crew survived.

== 27 August ==
List of shipwrecks: 27 August 1886
Ship	State	Description
Bournemouth	United Kingdom	The paddle steamer stranded in fog off the Portland, Dorset. All 197 people on board were rescued. She was on an excursion from Torquay, Devon to Bournemouth, Hampshire.

== 28 August ==
List of shipwrecks: 28 August 1886
Ship	State	Description
Chagford	United Kingdom	The ship departed from Santa Anna for Portland, Dorset. No further trace, reported overdue.
Quail	United Kingdom	The steamship collided with the steamship St. Martin (France) and sank in the English Channel 20 nautical miles (37 km) west of Beachy Head, Sussex with the loss of a crew member. Quail was on a voyage from Antwerp, Belgium to Glasgow, Renfrewshire.

== 29 August ==
List of shipwrecks: 29 August 1886
Ship	State	Description
Ferntower	United Kingdom	The steamship foundered at sea with the loss of all but two of those on board. She was on a voyage from Saigon, French Indo-China to Hong Kong.

== 31 August ==
List of shipwrecks: 31 August 1886
Ship	State	Description
Alaska	United Kingdom	The steamship ran aground in Gedney's Channel. She was on a voyage from Philadelphia, Pennsylvania, United States to Liverpool, Lancashire.

== Unknown date ==
List of shipwrecks: Unknown date in August 1886
Ship	State	Description
Aberdeen	United Kingdom	The steamship foundered in the China Sea before 20 August. She was on a voyage from Hankou, China to London.
Alata	Norway	The barque was driven ashore on "Boompjes Island", Netherlands East Indies.
Alsace-Lorraine	France	The steamship ran aground in the Hooghly River at Budge Budge, India.
Anne Maline	United Kingdom	The ship ran aground in the River Colne and sprang a leak. She was on a voyage from Turku, Grand Duchy of Finland to Colchester, Essex.
Annie	United Kingdom	The schooner collided with the steamship City of Exeter and sank at Cardiff, Glamorgan. Her crew were rescued.
Argo	Flag unknown	The steam yacht was driven ashore near Tønsberg, Norway.
Carlotta B.	Italy	The barque was abandoned in the Atlantic Ocean 6 nautical miles (11 km) off Cape Point, Cape Colony. Her crew were rescued.
Carrie Wyman	United States	The barque was wrecked at East London, Cape Colony. Her crew were rescued.
Clara Light	United States	The tender, a whaling schooner, was abandoned in ice in the Chukchi Sea 15 nautical miles (28 km) north of Point Franklin, Department of Alaska in late August.
Colón, and Wilton	Spain; United Kingdom	The steamships collided at Rotterdam, South Holland, Netherlands and were both severely damaged. Colón was on a voyage from Rotterdam to Bilbao. Wilton was on a voyage from Saint Petersburg, Russia to Rotterdam.
Cuthbert	United Kingdom	The brig ran aground on the Kentish Knock and was abandoned by her crew.
Dacota	United States	The schooner was lost on a voyage from San Francisco, California to Vladivostok, Russia.
Doris	United Kingdom	The schooner ran aground on the Goodwin Sands, Kent. She was on a voyage from Antwerp, Belgium to the Rio Grande. She was refloated and towed in to Dover, Kent by a tug.
Express	Sweden	The schooner was driven ashore at "Pontegroso". She was on a voyage from Rosario, Argentina to Santos, Brazil.
Freir	Norway	The barque was driven ashore and wrecked on Miquelon. Her crew were rescued.
Furnessia	United Kingdom	The steamship ran aground in the Clyde near Greenock, Renfrewshire. She was on a voyage from New York, United States to Glasgow, Renfrewshire.
George L. Smith	United States	he fishing schooner vanished on the Grand Banks of Newfoundland after being sighted on 21 August. Lost with all fourteen hands.
Hermod	Norway	The barque was wrecked at Cabarete, Dominican Republic.
Hindoustan	France	The steamship ran aground in the Suez Canal whilst avoiding a collision with another vessel.
John and James	United Kingdom	The tug was run into by Pitre and Marie (Flag Unknown) and sank at Cardiff.
John F. Wonson	United States	The fishing schooner departed from Gloucester, Massachusetts on 4 August for Brown's Bank and vanished. Lost with all ten hands.
Julie	Norway	The barque was wrecked on the Scroby Sand, Norfolk, United Kingdom. She was on a voyage from Drøbak to London.
Linda	United Kingdom	The steamship ran aground in the Danube.
Madras	United Kingdom	The steamship was wrecked in the Taichow Islands. Her crew were rescued. She was on a voyage from Nagasaki, Japan to Hong Kong.
Morbihan	France	The ship was driven ashore and wrecked on Miquelon with the loss of her captain.
Rosalie	Denmark	The barque was wrecked on the Chincorro Banks.
Savina	Italy	The barque was in collision with the steamship Hesperus (United Kingdom) at Buenos Aires and was severely damaged. Savina was on a voyage from Pensacola, Florida, United States to Buenos Aires.
Staffa	United Kingdom	The steamship ran aground on the Caskier Rock, off the "Island of Giona".
St. Pair	France	The brig collided with the barque Richelieu (France) and sank in the Grand Banks of Newfoundland. Her crew were rescued.
Sydenham	United Kingdom	The steamship collided with the steamship Lovaine and sank with the loss of a crew member. Sydenham was on a voyage from Cartagena, Spain to Swansea, Glamorgan.
Tagus	United Kingdom	The steamship was driven ashore at Gibraltar.
Tiger	Germany	The barque foundered in the Bay of Biscay. Her crew were rescued by the barque Bristol (United Kingdom).
The Craigs	United Kingdom	The barque was towed in to Key West, Florida, United States in a waterlogged condition by the steamship Cydonia (United Kingdom). The Craigs had been on a voyage from New Orleans, Louisiana, United States to Liverpool, Lancashire.
Vick and Mebane	Flag unknown	The ship was wrecked at Imbituba, Brazil. Her crew were rescued.
Virginia	United States	The full-rigged ship was abandoned at sea.
Weigh	United Kingdom	The smack was run down and sunk.
Woodlands	United Kingdom	The steamship struck the Pearl Rock and was beached at Punta Mala, Spain.
Xema	Flag unknown	The ship was driven ashore in the Turks Islands. She was later refloated.
Young Dick	Queensland	The schooner was wrecked on the Great Barrier Reef with the loss of all on board, more than 140 lives.
