= Seahorse Islands =

Island group in North Slope Borough, Alaska, United States

- Interactive map of Seahorse Islands

Geography
- Coordinates: 70°53′18″N 158°42′27″W
- Length: 5 km (3.1 mi)
- Highest elevation: 2 m (7 ft)

Administration
- United States
- State: Alaska

The Seahorse Islands is a chain of long and narrow sandy islands in western North Slope Borough, Alaska, United States. They are located between Peard Bay and the Chukchi Sea, 1.7 km (1.1 mi) east of Point Franklin. The longest island is about 5 km (3.1 mi) in length and the highest point of the islands is 2 m (6.6 ft). The shape of these coastal islands has changed over the years.

The Seahorse Islands were named by Captain Frederick William Beechey in 1826. Beechey had sent out his barge to explore the coastline further north. It reached the islands on August 21, 1826. Beechey, writing later, said: "On the 21st they arrived off a chain of sandy islands... which I have distinguished by the name of the Sea Horse Islands." "Sea Horse" is an antiquated term for the walrus.

== See also ==
- List of islands of Alaska
