= Kugrua Bay =

Arctic landform in the Alaska's North Slope

- Location within Alaska
- Location: Alaska
- Coordinates: 70.7813889°N 159.1272222°W
- Basin countries: United States

Kugrua Bay is a large bay located southwest of Peard Bay, by the Chukchi Sea, in Alaska's North Slope, United States. This area is mostly intact tundra, and is part of the polar desert.
