= Whaling disaster of 1871 =

Trapped whaling ships that were abandoned

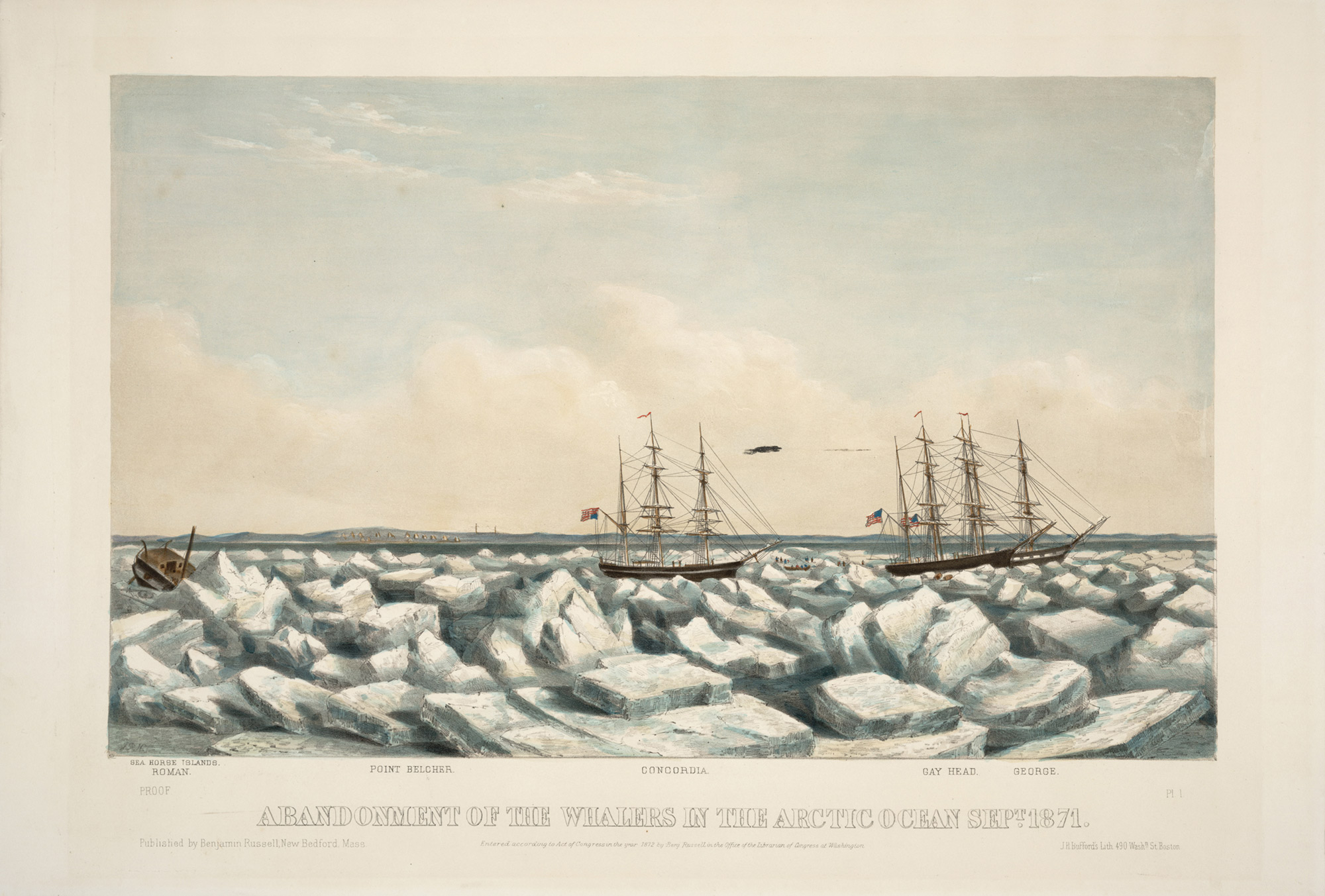
The Whaling Disaster of 1871. Plate 1, portrayed by John Perry Newell

The whaling disaster of 1871 was an incident off the northern Alaskan coast in which a fleet of 33 American whaling ships were trapped in the Arctic ice in September 1871 and were subsequently abandoned and lost. It dealt a serious blow to the American whaling industry, already in decline.

By the 1870s, in the waning years of the whaling industry, the whaling fleet made annual voyages to the Arctic in search of bowhead whales. The “Arctic grounds” from the Bering Strait to Point Barrow had been hunted for over 20 years. The Bowhead whale population in the Arctic was discovered by Captain Thomas Welcome Roys, who sailed the New Bedford whaling ship Superior past the Bering Strait in late July 1848. By the end of August, the Superior had caught 11 Bowheads yielding 1,600 barrels of oil. This was the equivalent catch of three years sailing in only two months. This was enabled by the whale's large layer of insulating blubber from the months of feeding in the cold Arctic waters.

== The 1871 whaling season ==
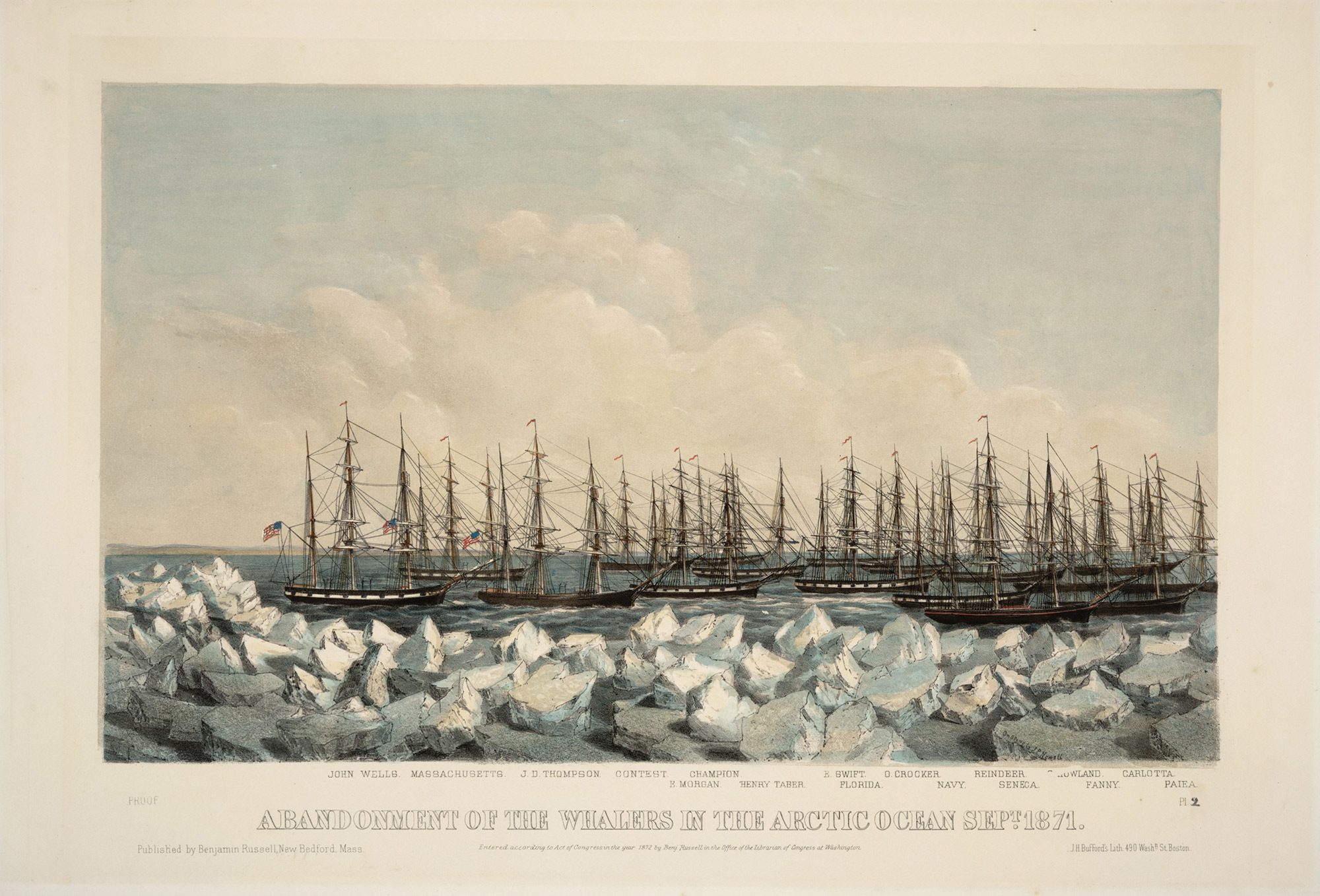
The Whaling Disaster of 1871. Plate 2

In late June 1871, forty whaleships passed north through Bering Strait, hunting bowhead whales.

The 1868 – 1870 Arctic whaling seasons had been very profitable, with good catches and excellent weather starting in March and extending into September. Whales could be struck from the Bering Strait up to the northernmost ground at Point Barrow.

The spring and summer of 1871 had been dominated by northeasterly winds that pushed ice floes towards the Alaskan coast. The fleet did not clear the Bering Strait until late June.

In mid-June the surviving crew of the whaleship Japan out of Melbourne, Victoria, which had been wrecked and repaired the previous year, were rescued from the Siberian coast and distributed among the fleet. Lewis Kennedy, seaman, of the Japan died on board the Henry Taber.

Bad luck struck early in the voyage. The New Bedford whaler Oriole struck an ice floe before the fleet crossed the Bering Strait. It was grounded on the Siberian shore and hove down for inspection. The damage was too great to repair, and the ship had to be abandoned. Captain Dexter of the Emily Morgan bought the wreck for $1,300 for salvage.

The final months of the fleet are summarized from the Captain's Logs:

- The month of July was marked by blocking ice. While continuing to wait for the ice to clear, there was good whaling and taking of many walruses.
- In early August: Light winds were reported. Finally, a large channel of ice extending 5 miles offshore developed. The fleet pushed north. Whaling was still successful.
- August 11: Strong northwest winds. The channel narrowed to a mile from shore. Whaling was still good.
- August 13: The wind was reported as light but still from the northwest. Whaling was still good.
- August 14: A wind shift to a light Northeast wind. It persisted for three days.
- August 17: The 33 ships were still pinned near the shore. They were about 70 miles south of Point Barrow, with light northeast winds that continued for many days.
- Eskimo traders met with some of the ship Captains and told them they were not going to have similar conditions to 1870 and the ice would be pushed against them.
- August 28: The Elizabeth Swift was the lead whaler. The fleet was still slowly pushing north.
- August 29: A switch to southwest winds, driving ice floes back towards shore. the Monticello was isolated from the others due to the ice. It was grounded but refloated with help from other ship crews.
- August 30: A snowstorm was reported by the northernmost ships, and the fleet became more strung-out – over 50 miles from Wainwright inlet to Point Franklin.
- Sep 1: A strong southwest breeze. The Roman was struck by a floe while cutting-in to a bowhead. The ship sank fast, and the crew escaped in the whaleboats, a distance of about 20 miles, to other whaleships to the south.
- Sept 2: at 1 AM the Comet was crushed by incoming ice and was lost. The crew was dispersed among the surrounding ships. Captain Knowles of the George Howland purchased salvage rights for $13. There was no change in weather until Sep 8.
- Sept 8: A southwest blowing gale sent the whalers closer to the shore. The Elizabeth Swift was grounded and subsequently freed, and the Awashonks was crushed and lost.
- Sept 9: There was an attempt to lighten the two smallest whalers. The 270 ton Kohala and the 149 ton Victoria attempted to escape back to the Bering Strait but failed when both ships grounded.
- Sep 11: Three whaleboats from the Florida reached the southmost seven whaleships and notified them of an impending evacuation from the ships north of them. One whaleboat was sent back to the stranded fleet with a message that the ships would wait for the evacuees. The seven southern ships cleared the ice the next day and escaped South.
- Sept 12: With dwindling supplies and little prospect of rescue for as long as 11 months, the whaleship Captains gathered on the Florida to sign a “compact document” to explain their decision to abandon the fleet with its high value stores. “We, the undersigned, masters of whaleships now lying at Point Belcher, after holding a meeting concerning our dreadful situation, have all come to the conclusion that our ships cannot be got out this year, and there being no harbor that we can get our vessels into, and not having provisions enough to feed our crews to exceed three months, and being in a barren country, where there is neither food nor fuel to be obtained, we feel ourselves under the painful necessity of abandoning our vessels, and trying to work our way south with our boats, and, if possible, get on board of ships that south of the ice.”
- Sept 14: Abandonment of the fleet

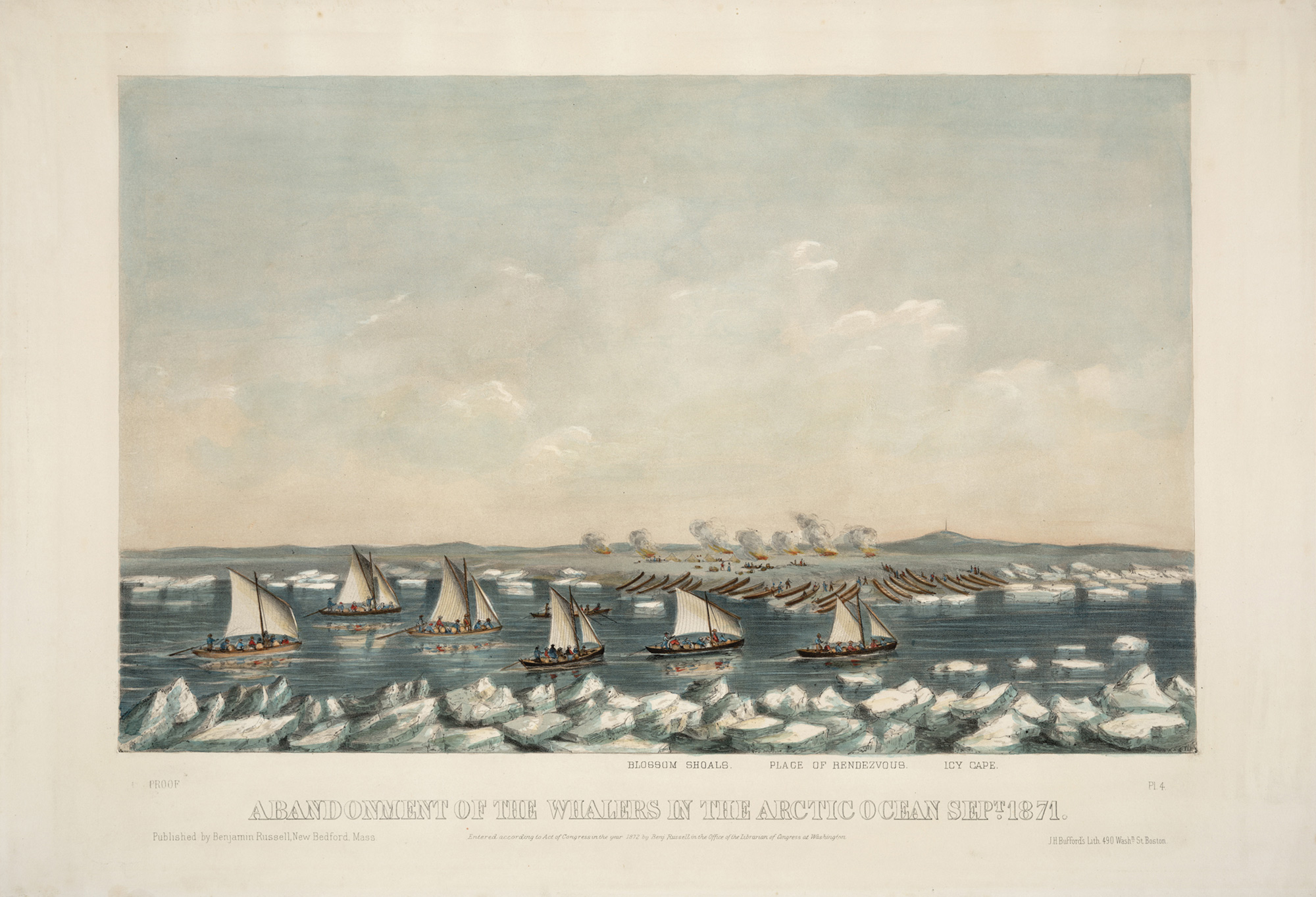
The Whaling Disaster of 1871. Plate 4

The vessels were still spread out in a long line, some 60 miles (97 km) south of Point Franklin. The ships were in groups of three to five, separated by ice, but within sight of other ships. The signal of abandonment was to strike the American flag. On the morning of September 14, each of the ships struck their flag, and the 1,219 people aboard the ships evacuated in small whaleboats with a supply of provisions, The journey of 70 miles (110 km) of ocean and ice took two days. They were brought to safety by the seven ships which had escaped the ice to the south. Amazingly, there were no casualties. It was widely reported and accepted that a single crew member stayed on the Massachusetts through that winter, but his identity has been lost to history.

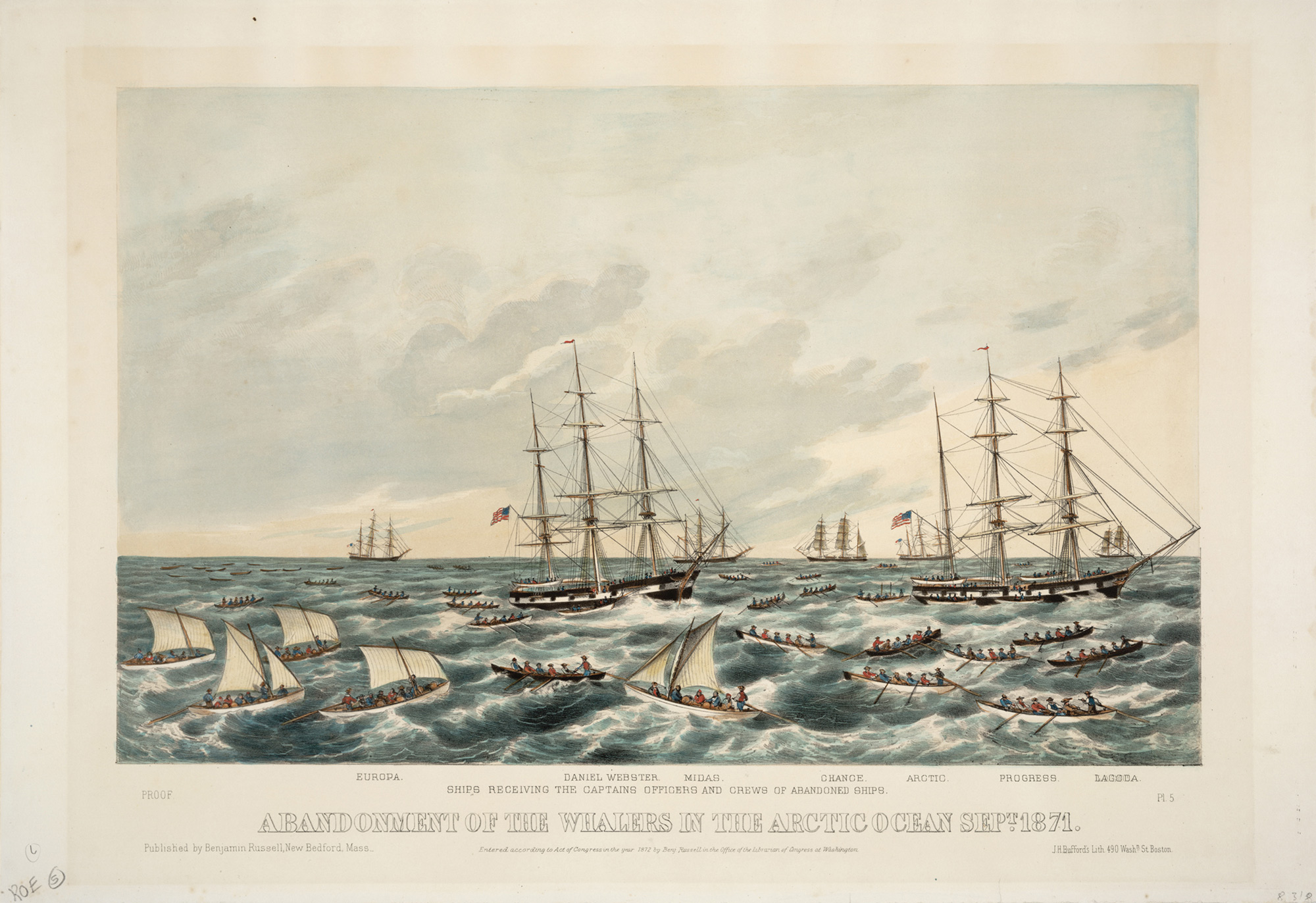
The Whaling Disaster of 1871. Plate 5. Ships receiving the captains and crews of abandoned ships.

The seven whalers that escaped took the following number of rescued whale men: the Europa (280), the Arctic (250), the Progress (221), the Lagoda (195), the Daniel Webster (113), the Midas (100), and the Chance (96). They were forced to dump their catch and most of their equipment overboard to make room for passengers on the return trip to Honolulu.

Ironically, a Northeast gale arrived two weeks after the abandonment. Capt. Williams of the Monticello wrote that "If we had waited until this gale came, without doubt the greater part of the fleet would have been saved"

The total loss was valued at over $1,600,000 ($52.6 million in 2026 dollars). Twenty-two of the wrecked vessels were from the Port of New Bedford in Massachusetts. Except for the two that were salvaged in 1872, the rest were crushed in the ice, sank, or were stripped of wood by the local Inupiat. It is reported that the Concordia, George Howland, and the Thomas Dickason, owned by George (Jr.) and Matthew Howland brothers, were not insured and represented 1/3 of their fleet. There were about 200 American whaling ships and 20 British whaling ships in the Pacific and Arctic Oceans prior to this disaster.

== Lost whaling vessels ==
The lost vessels were as follows:

Vessel	Homeport	Captain	Est Vessel value	Notes
Awashonks	New Bedford, MA	Ariel Norton	$58,000	Crushed in the ice on September 8, 1871.
Concordia	New Bedford, MA	Robert Jones	$75,000	Abandoned and lost. Wreck burned by Inuit. This ship was on its maiden voyage
Contest	New Bedford, MA	Leander C. Owen	$40,000	Abandoned and lost.
Elizabeth Swift	New Bedford, MA	George W. Bliven	$60,000	Abandoned and lost.
Emily Morgan	New Bedford, MA	Benjamin Dexter	$60,000	Abandoned and lost. Wreck later found ashore.
Eugenia	New Bedford, MA	Daniel B. Nye	$56,000	Abandoned and lost.
Fanny	New Bedford, MA	Lewis W. Williams	$58,000	Abandoned and lost.
Gay Head	New Bedford, MA	William H. Kelley	$40,000	Abandoned and lost. Wreck burned by Inuit.
George	New Bedford, MA	Abraham Osborn	$40,000	Abandoned and lost.
George Howland	New Bedford, MA	James H. Knowles	$43,000	Abandoned and lost.
Henry Taber	New Bedford, MA	Timothy C. Packard	$52,000	Abandoned and lost.
John Wells	New Bedford, MA	Aaron Dean	$40,000	Abandoned and lost.
Massachusetts	New Bedford, MA	West Mitchell	$46,000	Abandoned and wrecked. A lone sailor remained with the wreck through the winter.
Minerva	New Bedford, MA	Hezekiah Allen	$50,000	Abandoned. Discovered intact in 1872; manned and taken south.
Navy	New Bedford, MA	George F. Bouldry	$48,000	Abandoned and lost.
Oliver Crocker	New Bedford, MA	James H. Fisher	$48,000	Abandoned and lost.
Reindeer	New Bedford, MA	B. F. Loveland	$40,000	Abandoned and lost. Sunken wreck found in 1872.
Roman	New Bedford, MA	Jared Jernegan	$60,000	Crushed in the ice on September 1, 1871.
Seneca	New Bedford, MA	Edmund Kelley	$70,000	Abandoned and lost. Beached wreck found in 1872. Lost in a gale in the Pacific Ocean after being recovered.
Thomas Dickason	New Bedford, MA	Valentine Lewis	$50,000	Abandoned and lost. Wreck found in 1872.
William Rotch	Honolulu, HI	Benjamin D. Whitney	$43,000	Abandoned and lost.
Monticello	New London, CT	Thomas W. Williams	$45,000	Abandoned and lost.
J.D. Thompson	New London, CT	Capt. Allen	$45,000	Abandoned and lost.
Carlotta	San Francisco, CA	E. Everett Smith	$52,000	Abandoned and lost.
Florida	San Francisco, CA	D. R. Fraser	$51,000	Abandoned and lost. Wreck burned by Inuit.
Victoria	San Francisco, CA	Capt. Redfield	$30,000	Abandoned and lost.
Comet	Honolulu, HI	Capt. J. Silva (possibly Joseph D Silva)	$20,000	Crushed in the ice on September 2, 1871.
Julian	Honolulu, HI	John Heppingstone	$40,000	Abandoned and lost.
Kohola	Honolulu, HI	Alexander Almy	$20,000	Abandoned and lost. Wreck later found ashore.
Paiea	Honolulu, HI	Capt. Newbury	$20,000	Abandoned and lost.
Champion	Edgartown, MA	Henry Pease	$40,000	Abandoned and lost. Wreck later found ashore.
Mary	Edgartown, MA	Edward P. Herendeen	$57,000	Abandoned and lost.

== Salvage of 1872 ==
After the news of the lost fleet, a number of Salvage companies sent ships to the Arctic in 1872 to recover what valuable whale oil and whalebone that they could. The first company that reached the wrecks was the Florence, a San Francisco salvage ship from a company formed by Mr. Thomas Williams and Samual Merritt. They found many of the wrecks, some of which were burned by the Inupiaq Eskimos. They recovered two of the ships, the Minerva and the Seneca, and, along with the Florence, distributed the recovered whale oil and tons of whalebone. Since only the Minerva was capable of sailing on its own, the Seneca was towed by the Florence. Unfortunately, on the return to San Francisco, the Seneca was lost in a gale. The value of the recovered cargo was $10,000, less than 1% of the total estimated cargo value of $1.6M.

== Decade of high losses ==
In 1876, another disaster struck the Arctic Whaling fleet. Of the 20 ships entering the Bering Strait, 12 of them were lost in the same way. The Artic was lost in early July off Point Franklin. The Fleet entered the Bering Strait in July and pushed north in a narrow line near shore, while whaling around the ice floes through September. The fleet was evacuated in mid-September when the ice floes again held the ships fast to the coast, driven by northeasterly winds. The lost ships were: Artic, Onward, Java, Clara Bell, St. George, Cornelius Howland, Illinois, Josephine, Marengo and three Hawaiian whalers, The Desmona, W.A. Farnsworth, and William H. Allen

Of the losses, the Onward, Java, Clara Bell and St. George were again George and Matthew Howland ships. In five years, they had lost seven of their ten ships.

The whaleships Rainbow, Three Brothers, and Florence transported 300 men to safety. Of the 50 men who stayed as caretakers of their ships in hopes of salvage the following year, only 3 survived.

In the final three years of the decade, nine more whaleships were lost. In total, 70 Whalers were lost in the 1870s, forty-two of them casualties of the 1871 and 1876 disasters.

== Compensation claims by the Chance ==
The British barque Chance and the Hawaiian barque Arctic (Captain Tripp) presented the government of the US with a claim for service rendered for $9520.

The firm of Messrs. Barron and Austin were the managing owners of the 320 ton British whaling barque Chance (out of Sydney, New South Wales), together with other owners. It departed Sydney for a whaling voyage on 22 February 1871 under the command of Captain Thos. S. Norton with a chief officer, four mates and a crew of 28. Fit-out prior to departure had cost £3200 or US$16000. A spike in the price of sperm whale oil in 1870 prompted the owners of several Sydney whaling ships to form the Sydney Whaling Company in 1871 and issue a prospectus to raise capital to buy new vessels and improve their existing ones. This prospectus valued the Chance, including insurance and the catch of its current [1871] voyage at £6,084. Both Joseph Gerrish Barron and Solon Seneca Austin (Mesrs. Barron and Austin) were sea captains from the United States who were living in Sydney. On 13 November 1872 the interests of that firm were transferred to the firm of Lane, Chester and Co. and the partnership of Barron and Austin was dissolved on 31 March 1873.

The Chance arrived at the port of Honolulu in the Kingdom of Hawaii on 30 October 1871. Captains J. H. Fisher and J. Silva of the barque Oliver Crocker and the brig Comet wrote a public letter expressing gratitude to the captain and officers of the Chance for the genuine hospitality received while on board. The crew of the Japan were also on board. On 27 July 1872 USD35 a head payment under the disabled and destitute sailors' act, for the support of the 96 rescued sailors while they were on board the Chance, was received from the U.S. Government, after application was made by the ship's agents in Honolulu without the knowledge of the ship's owners. After having repairs done in Honolulu, the Chance departed two weeks later intending to proceed to Sydney via the New Zealand whaling ground. The barque arrived back in Sydney from Honolulu on 28 January 1872 with 150 barrels sperm, 150 barrels whale oil and 2,000 pounds (910 kg) bone instead of the 800 barrels of oil and 12,000 pounds (5,400 kg) bone that could have been expected.

Barron and Austin first made a claim against the United States government for compensation for losses on 15 February 1872. In 1877, after intervention from the Earl of Derby, British Secretary of State for Foreign Affairs, the process of putting the matter before the American Congress commenced. After a Report was ordered printed on 31 March 1880 by the U.S House of Representatives, Benjamin W. Harris, of Massachusetts introduced a bill in December 1881 for the relief of the owners, officers, and crew of the British bark Chance to the U.S. Congress; which was read a first and second time, referred to the Committee on Foreign Affairs, and ordered to be printed. By 1886 the Bill for the relief of the owners, officers and crew (who would have all received a proportion of the value of the catch) of the Chance had made it to the Senate where the Senate agreed to increasing the sum from $10,000 to $15,500 to allow for fifteen years' interest. The break with the tradition of not allowing interest was because the funds were owed to foreign people. The Bill was read a third time and passed. The Bill was signed by the President of the United States in April 1890, almost nineteen years after the event. Of the US$16,000 compensation paid, £2448 7s 2d was paid to the Government of New South Wales to pay to the owners, officers and crew of the Chance.

== Two of the wrecks located (2015) ==
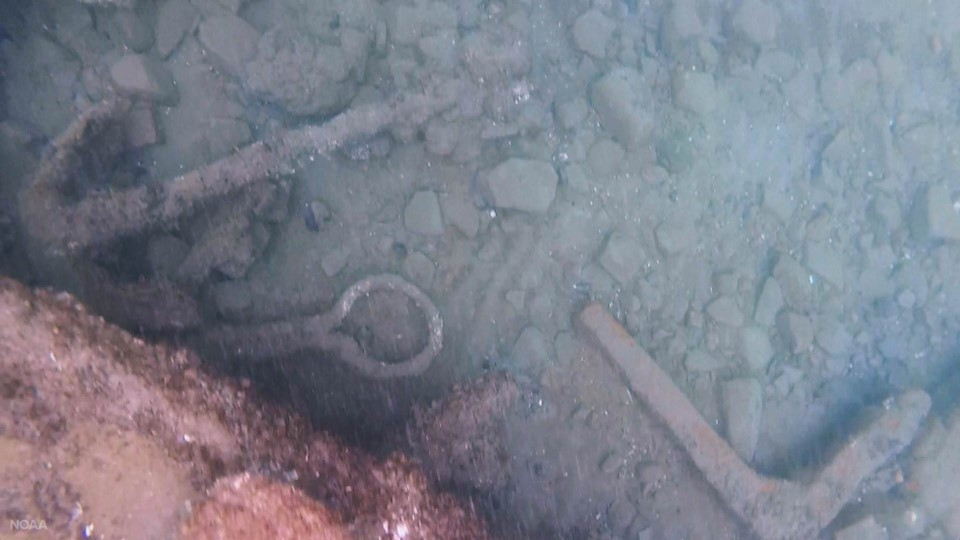
A small anchor and other objects that were observed during the Lost Whaling Fleet NOAA expedition

In 2015, NOAA funded a research expedition entitled "The Search for the Lost Whaling Fleets of the Western Arctic". One hundred forty-four years after the disaster, acoustic mapping of the ocean floor detected the wrecks of two whaleships that were "remarkably well preserved". Visualized details of anchors, fasteners, ballast, and the brick-lined try-pots positively identified them as 19th century whalers. Although many whaleships hunted in those waters, the expedition archeologist and co-director Dr. Brad Barr believed that they were wrecks from the 1871 disaster, as it is the same area where whaleship planks washed up on shore for many years thereafter. The identity of the two wrecks is currently not known. Due to the shallow depths of the survey area (average depth was 28 feet), it is thought by the expedition leaders that the other wrecks were destroyed over time by the action of the sea. The site is protected under Historic Protection Laws of the United States, and NOAA has not released the precise location to the general public. Dr. Barr was hopeful that expeditions by other marine archeologists could do a more complete survey of the wrecks sometime in the future, possibly even identifying them, but NOAA will likely not return to the area again.

== See also ==
- Whale oil
- Overland Relief Expedition
