= Lagoda =

Half-scale model of the whaling ship Lagoda, located at the New Bedford Whaling Museum

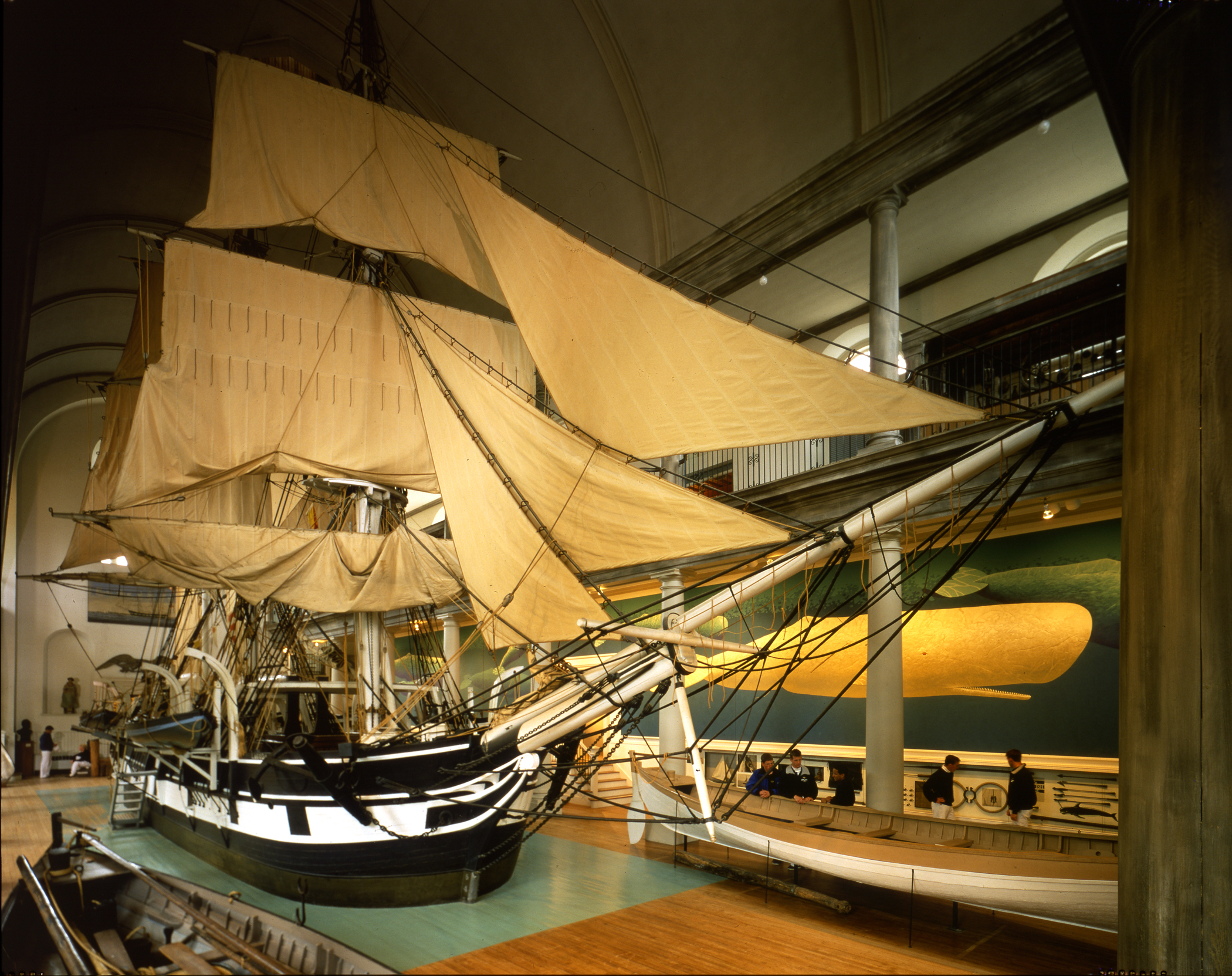
The Lagoda model in the Bourne Building of the New Bedford Whaling Museum.

The Lagoda was a merchant ship built in 1826, converted to a whaling ship in 1841, and broken up in 1899. A half-scale model of the Lagoda in the New Bedford Whaling Museum commissioned in 1916 is the world's largest ship model.

== History ==
The Lagoda was a merchant ship built in 1826 in the Wanton Shipyard on the North River in what is now Norwell, Massachusetts. The shipyard was owned and managed by shipbuilders Seth and Samuel Foster, and the ship was commissioned by Duxbury merchant Ezra Weston II.

Originally intended to be named "Ladoga" after Lake Ladoga in Russia, the letters "d" and "g" were accidentally swapped and, due to superstition that correcting the name would bring bad luck, she remained the "Lagoda". The ship's frame was constructed of live oak, and she had 3 masts and weighed 340 tons.

Weston employed the Lagoda for about seven years as a merchant vessel in trade with northern European ports. On February 25, 1833, Weston sold the ship to Boston merchant William Oliver. In 1841, she was purchased by Jonathan Bourne Jr. of New Bedford and converted to a whaling ship. The refit included the installation of a trywork, an on-board pair of trypots used to render blubber into whale oil. In 1860, the ship was converted it from full-rigged ship into a bark, which allowed it to be manned with a smaller crew and to sail closer to the wind.

The Lagoda was one of the few ships to escape the whaling disaster of 1871, an incident in which 40 ships whaling in the Arctic late in the season were surrounded by ice. Thirty-three of the ships were trapped or crushed, but the Lagoda was one of the 7 ships that narrowly escaped, and it carried 195 of the 1,219 survivors to safety in Honolulu, Hawaii.

By the time Bourne sold the Lagoda in 1886, the ship had generated a profit of about $652,000 (equivalent to $23,000,000 in 2025). In 1889, the ship left the US to work as a coal hulk in Japan, being used to fuel steamboats in Yokohama, until she was sold again and eventually broken up in 1899.

== Half-size replica ==
In 1915, Jonathan Bourne Jr.'s daughter Emily Bourne donated the Bourne Building to the New Bedford Whaling Museum in memory of her father. She also contributed funds to build a half-size model of the Lagoda, and the museum commissioned shipwrights to build it in 1916. At 89 feet (27 m) in length and with a mainmast of 50 feet (15 m), it is the largest ship model in the world. The model is fully rigged and is outfitted with some of the supplies needed for a whaling voyage. The Bourne Building in which the model is located was renovated in 2010, and an interactive kiosk was installed to provide visitors with further information about the ship.
