= Department of Alaska =

Department of the United States (1867–1884)

Coordinates: 64°N 153°W

- Territory (Note: Administered by U.S. Army (1867–77); Administered by U.S. Treasury (1877–79); Administered by U.S. Navy (1879–84)) of the United States
- 1867–1884
- Flag

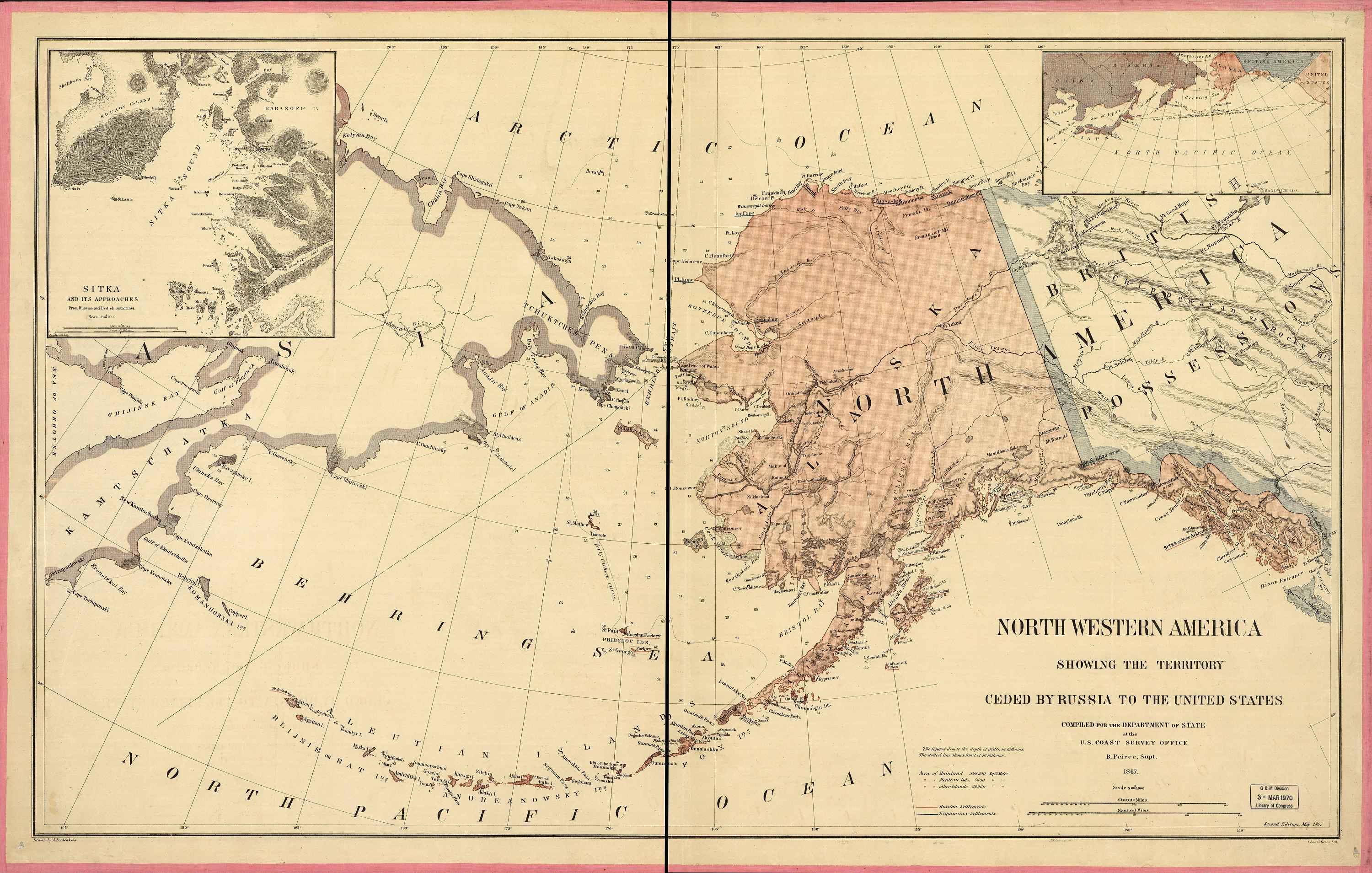
- Map of the Department of Alaska
- Capital: Sitka
- Government
  - Type: Incorporated and unorganized territory
- Governor
  - 1868–1870: Brevet Maj. Gen. Jefferson C. Davis
  - 1874: Brevet Major George B. Rodney
  - 1884: Lt. Cmdr. Henry E. Nichols
- History
  - Department of Alaska: October 18, 1867
  - District of Alaska: May 17, 1884
Preceded by	Succeeded by
Russian America	District of Alaska

Historical population
Year	Pop.	±%
1880	33,426	—
Source: 1880;

The Department of Alaska was the federal government's designation for Alaska from its purchase by the United States in 1867 until its organization as the District of Alaska in 1884. During the department era, Alaska was variously under the jurisdiction of the U.S. Army (until 1877), the U.S. Dept. of the Treasury (from 1877 until 1879), and the U.S. Navy (from 1879 until 1884). The area later became the District of Alaska, then the Territory of Alaska, then the state of Alaska.

== History ==
At the instigation of U.S. Secretary of State William Seward, the United States Senate approved the purchase of Alaska from the Russian Empire for $7,200,000 on April 9, 1867, and the United States flag was raised on October 18 of that same year (now called Alaska Day). Coincident with the ownership change, the de facto International Date Line was moved westward, and Alaska changed from the Julian calendar to the Gregorian calendar. Therefore, for residents, the day after Friday, October 6, 1867, was Friday, October 18, 1867; two Fridays in a row because of the date line shift

On the morning of October 18, 1867, USS Ossipee arrived at Sitka with Russian Commissioner Captain Alexis Pestchouroff and American Commissioner General Lovell Rousseau on board. That afternoon, 250 American soldiers, 80 Russian soldiers, Russian-American Company Chief Manager Prince Maksutov and his wife, and a group of locals assembled at the flagstaff in front of the governor's residence (on what has come to be known as "Baranof (Baronov) Castle Hill" to witness the lowering of the flag of Russia and the raising of the U.S. flag in its place.

A dual cannon salute was fired for each flag, and each commissioner gave a short speech. Perhaps misunderstanding the directions, the Russian soldier bringing his country's flag down tore it loose, then dropped it. The banner drifted down and was caught on a portion of the upraised bayonets of the Russian garrison. Princess Maksutov is said to have fainted at the sight.

Legend has it that the first American administrator of Alaska was Polish immigrant Włodzimierz Krzyżanowski. However, the Anchorage Daily News was unable to find any conclusive information to support or disprove this claim. Public opinion in the United States was generally positive, though some criticized the purchase as "Seward's Folly" or "Seward's Icebox". However, the resources of Alaska would soon show that this was a wise transaction. Alaska celebrates the purchase each year on the last Monday of March, which is known as Seward's Day.

When the United States first bought Alaska, vast regions of the area still remained unexplored by Europeans and Lower 48 Americans. In 1865, Western Union decided to lay a telegraph line across Alaska to the Bering Strait, where it would connect with an Asian line. Robert Kennicott, part of a Western Union surveying effort, led his crew to Nulato on the banks of the Yukon. He died the following year, and William Healey Dall took charge of scientific affairs. The Western Union expedition conducted the first scientific studies of the region and produced the first map of the entire Yukon River. That same year, 1866, workers finally succeeded in laying an Atlantic undersea telegraph cable, and the Alaskan overland project was abandoned. Dall returned to Alaska many times, recording and naming geological features.

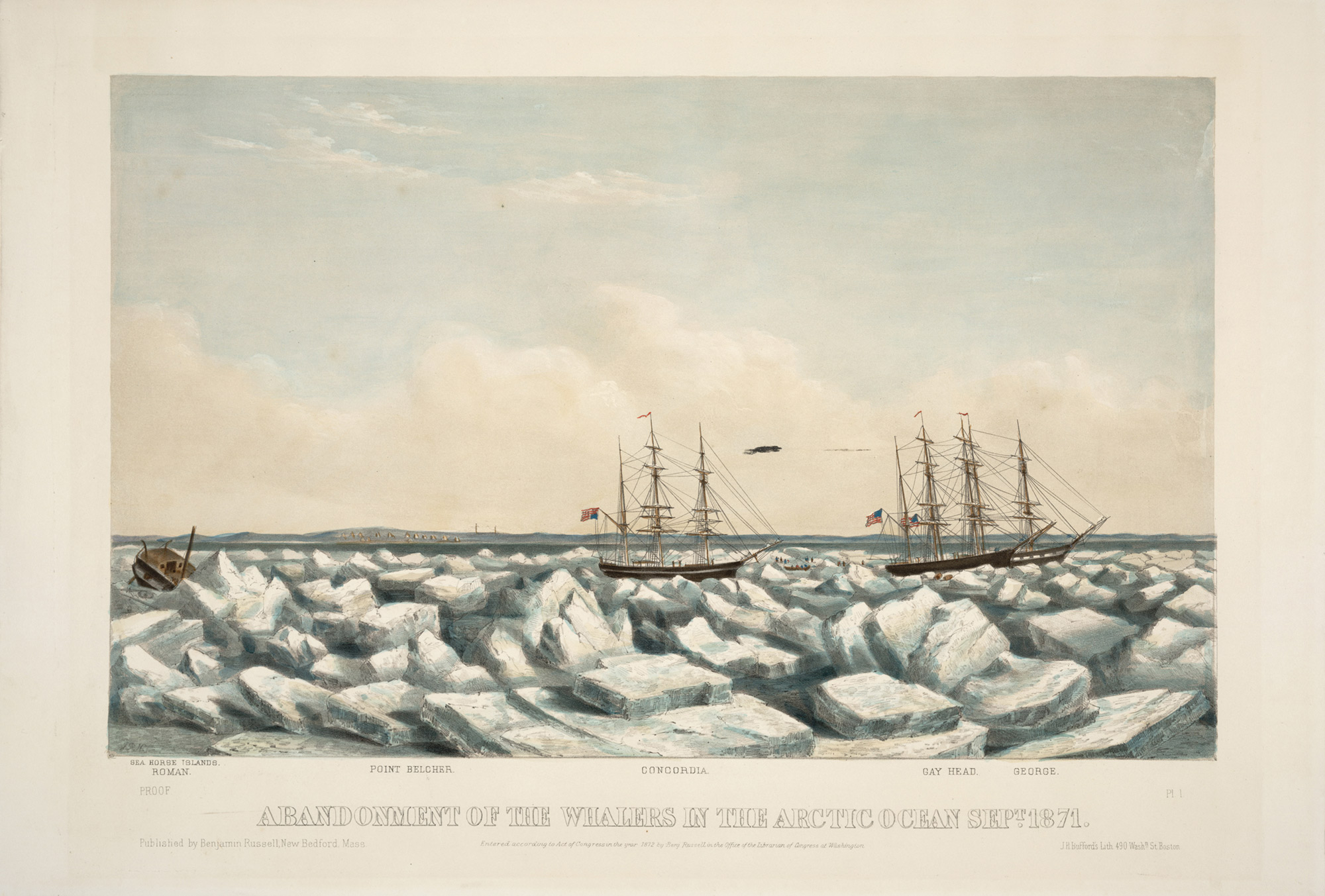
The whaling disaster of 1871 (art by John Perry Newell) saw the loss of 33 American whaling ships and dozens of sailors off the northern Alaskan coast.

The Alaska Commercial Company also contributed to the growing exploration of Alaska in the last decades of the 1800s, building trading posts along the interior's many rivers. Small parties of trappers and traders entered the interior, and, though the federal government provided little money to the region, army officers would occasionally explore on their own. In a four-month journey, Lt. Frederick Schwatka and his party rafted the Yukon from Lake Lindeman in Canada to Saint Michael near the river's mouth on the Bering Sea. In 1885, Lt. Henry T. Allen and four others left the Gulf of Alaska, followed the Copper River, crossed a mountain range, traveled down the Tanana River to the Yukon, and portaged to the Kanuti and Koyukuk rivers. Allen went up the Koyukuk, then back down the Yukon, crossed over to Unalakeet on the coast, and then made his way to Saint Michael, exploring about 1,500 miles (2,400 km) of Interior Alaska.

== See also ==
- List of governors of Alaska
- List of governors of dependent territories in the 19th century
