= Peard Bay =

Bay in the Chukchi Sea on Alaska's North Slope

Peard Bay is a bay in the Chukchi Sea, in Alaska's North Slope. It is located at 70°50′43″N 158°48′39″W. This bay lies just a few miles northeast of Wainwright. It was named by Frederick William Beechey in 1826, after one of his officers.

Peard Bay is relatively small and it is limited by Point Franklin on its western side.

Peard Bay Airport (WQJ) is close to the bay area.

In several documents this bay is named erroneously as "Pearl Bay".

Kugrua Bay is a smaller bay to the southeast, accessible through an opening in the shoreline of Peard Bay.

== History ==
The name Peard Bay used to design a much wider area in the past, comprised between Seahorse Islands and Point Barrow. (Note: Cfr. Baker, 1909 and USRCS, 1900, with Orth, 1967 and modern maps. It's unclear when this change took place, presumably around World War I. Other placenames in the bay, like Skull Cliff and Peard Cliff seem to have been moved as well.)
