= Point Franklin =

Point on North Slope, Alaska, U.S.

Coordinates: 70°54′28″N 158°48′31″W

Point Franklin is a piece of land located on the Chukchi Sea side of North Slope, Alaska.

Point Franklin is a few miles north of Wainwright, limiting with the Peard Bay to the east.

Point Franklin was named by British mariner Frederick William Beechey on August 15, 1826, after Lieutenant (afterwards Sir) John Franklin. It is a strange coincidence that he named this cape just two days after Sir John Franklin had named his "farthest point" after Captain Beechey.

Sea otters are a common sight in the waters near Point Franklin. Whales can also be sighted offshore in the point area.

== Rescue of 1898 ==
On 26 March 1898, after a 1,500-mile trek in the middle of an Arctic winter, Lt. David Henry Jarvis of the Revenue Cutter Service reaches Point Franklin to begin the rescue of 273 iced-in whalers stranded here and at Point Barrow. He finds the marooned whalers of the Belvedere near the Sea Horse Islands.
