= List of shipwrecks in 1897 =

The list of shipwrecks in 1897 includes ships sunk, foundered, grounded, or otherwise lost during 1897.

table of contents
1897
Jan	Feb	Mar	Apr
May	Jun	Jul	Aug
Sep	Oct	Nov	Dec
Unknown date

== January ==
=== 1 January ===
List of shipwrecks: 1 January 1897
Ship	State	Description
Favorite		The vessel was wrecked on this date in Australia.

=== 2 January ===
List of shipwrecks: 2 January 1897
Ship	State	Description
Commodore	United States	The steamboat was wrecked, or sprung a leak and sank, off Mosquito Inlet, Florida with the loss of either one or seven lives.

=== 3 January ===
List of shipwrecks: 3 January 1897
Ship	State	Description
Quickstep	United States	The steamer was destroyed by fire at dock in Lake Washington.

=== 6 January ===
List of shipwrecks: 6 January 1897
Ship	State	Description
Job T. Wilson	United States	The tugboat was sunk by Howard (United States) in the Patapsco River. Her cook and engineer drowned.

=== 7 January ===
List of shipwrecks: 7 January 1897
Ship	State	Description
Belle of the Coast	United States	The laid up steamer was destroyed by fire at dock at Carrollton, Louisiana.
Peankeshaw No. 108	United States	The steamer was crushed by ice in mid-channel between Evansville, Indiana and the Green River, a total loss. Her chief engineer drowned.

=== 9 January ===
List of shipwrecks: 9 January 1897
Ship	State	Description
Belle of Brownsville	United States	The ferry burned to the waterline at Cairo, Illinois.
Elsa	United States	The steamer was wrecked on Colorado Reef on a trip from New Orleans to Central America.

=== 14 January ===
List of shipwrecks: 14 January 1897
Ship	State	Description
RIMS Warren Hastings	Royal Indian Marine	A sketch depicting the wreck of RIMS Warren Hastings, published by the Dundee Courier on 24 March 1897 The troopship was wrecked off the coast of Réunion with the loss of two lives.

=== 21 January ===
List of shipwrecks: 21 January 1897
Ship	State	Description
Yosemite	United States	The fishing schooner went ashore on Ram Island, near Lockeport, Nova Scotia. Her Cook drowned when she struck, a crewman broke both legs and died on the island before crew was able to get to shore.

=== 28 January ===
List of shipwrecks: 28 January 1897
Ship	State	Description
Argo	United States	The yacht was sunk in a collision with Albert Dumois (Norway) in the Mississippi River 80 miles (130 km) below New Orleans, Louisiana. Two passengers, reporters for the Times Picayune, were killed.

=== 29 January ===
List of shipwrecks: 29 January 1897
Ship	State	Description
Maggie and Lilly	United States	The fishing schooner foundered on the Georges Bank. Her crew taken off by Edith M. McInnes (United States).

=== 30 January ===
List of shipwrecks: 30 January 1897
Ship	State	Description
Iron Cliff	United States	The steamer sprung a leak and sank at Greenville, Mississippi, a total loss.

=== Unknown date ===
List of shipwrecks: Unknown January 1897
Ship	State	Description
Lizzie J. Greenleaf	United States	The fishing schooner was last seen 11 January on Banquereau and probably sank in a gale on 26 January. Lost with all 19 crew.

== February ==
=== 1 February ===
List of shipwrecks: 1 February 1897
Ship	State	Description
Alice	United States	The steamer struck a snag and sank in the Amite River Later raised.
City of Athens	United States	The steamer sprung a leak and sank at Port Thompson, Florida.
H. M. Townsend	United States	The laid up steamer was sunk by ice 1 mile (1.6 km) below Memphis, Tennessee, a total loss.

=== 2 February ===
List of shipwrecks: 2 February 1897
Ship	State	Description
Imbros	United Kingdom	The steamship ran aground on the Helwick Bank, in the Bristol Channel. She was subsequently refloated and beached at The Mumbles, Glamorgan.

=== 4 February ===
List of shipwrecks: 4 February 1897
Ship	State	Description
Roy Lynds	United States	The ferry's port side was crushed by ice and she sank opposite Lexington, Missouri in the Missouri River, a total wreck.

=== 7 February ===
List of shipwrecks: 7 February 1897
Ship	State	Description
Maggie Paden	United States	The steamer was sunk by ice while harbored at the mouth of the Little Kanawha River, a total loss. Her machinery was salvaged.

=== 8 February ===
List of shipwrecks: 8 February 1897
Ship	State	Description
Eugene	United States	The steamer struck a snag near Clayton's Landing and sank in shallow water. The vessel was pumped out and taken to Pine Bluff, Arkansas for repair.

=== 9 February ===
List of shipwrecks: 9 February 1897
Ship	State	Description
Josephine	United States	The ferry sank lying at Glenwood, Pennsylvania in the Monongahela River when a pipe froze and burst. Later raised.

=== 11 February ===
List of shipwrecks: 11 February 1897
Ship	State	Description
A. C. Van Raalte	United States	The tow steamer's bow was damaged by ice in Lake Michigan, she made it in to the Calumet River and sank.
General Franz Sigel	United States	The tow steamer was sunk in a collision with tow steamer New York Central Lighterage Co. No. 19 (United States) in the East River off Baltic street, Brooklyn. Raised and repaired. crew rescued by New York Central Lighterage Co. No. 19.

=== 12 February ===
List of shipwrecks: 12 February 1897
Ship	State	Description
Rapid	United Kingdom	The ketch ran aground and was wrecked at Cardigan.

=== 13 February ===
List of shipwrecks: 13 February 1897
Ship	State	Description
Edna	United States	The steamer struck something holing her and she sank at Gretna, Louisiana, a total loss.

=== 14 February ===
List of shipwrecks: 14 February 1897
Ship	State	Description
Mike Dougherty	United States	The tug sank at Brown's Station, Pennsylvania in the Monongahela River when a pipe froze and burst. Later raised.

=== 21 February ===
List of shipwrecks: 21 February 1897
Ship	State	Description
T. W. Ferry	United States	The fishing steamer was sunk at dock at the Pere Marquette Railway Company dock, Ludington, Michigan when struck by Pere Marquette (United States).

=== 22 February ===
List of shipwrecks: 22 February 1897
Ship	State	Description
Lucille	United States	The laid up launch foundered in a gale at dock in New Orleans, Louisiana. Later raised.

=== 23 February ===
List of shipwrecks: 23 February 1897
Ship	State	Description
C. W. Batchelor	United States	The passenger steamer was forced onto the bank by ice at St. Louis and sank, a total loss.

=== 26 February ===
List of shipwrecks: 26 February 1897
Ship	State	Description
Eagle	United States	The passenger steamer burned at Lexington, Missouri, a total loss.

== March ==
=== 2 March ===
List of shipwrecks: 2 March 1897
Ship	State	Description
Cyril	United Kingdom	The ketch, registered at Falmouth, England, with official number 62042, went missing in Bristol Channel with the loss of her captain, master mariner Thomas G. R. Cooper, and his 17-year-old son Norman Copper, both of Middle Terrace, Falmouth.
Favorite	United States	The steamer struck a tree that had collapsed into the Big Sandy River causing her to careen and sink up to the hurricane deck, from which the passengers climbed onto the tree and from there they were taken to shore in boats. Her machinery was salvaged, otherwise a total loss.

=== 4 March ===
List of shipwrecks: 4 March 1897
Ship	State	Description
Loy B.	United States	The passenger steamer was blown from her moorings at Kimmswick, Missouri sinking in the Mississippi River, a total loss.

=== 5 March ===
List of shipwrecks: 5 March 1897
Ship	State	Description
Rialto	United Kingdom	The cargo ship caught fire in the Atlantic Ocean 500 miles (800 km) off the coast of Ireland in a hurricane. Her 3rd engineer was killed in an explosion. The rest of the crew was rescued, when she was abandoned on 5 March, by Cartheginian (United Kingdom) that had been standing by for a break in the weather.

=== 8 March ===
List of shipwrecks: 8 March 1897
Ship	State	Description
Dauntless	United States	The steamer struck a pier of the Union Bridge, Pittsburgh, Pennsylvania, rolled on one side and sank in the Allegheny River. Raised and repaired.

=== 9 March ===
List of shipwrecks: 9 March 1897
Ship	State	Description
Beverly	United States	The ferry struck a bridge entering her slip and sank at Camden, New Jersey.

=== 12 March ===
List of shipwrecks: 12 March 1897
Ship	State	Description
Occident	United States	The steamer struck bottom crossing the bar into Nehalem River bringing down her smokestack and breaking the steam pipe disabling the ship. She was anchored and her crew went ashore. During the night she dragged anchor and went ashore, a total loss.

=== 14 March ===
List of shipwrecks: 14 March 1897
Ship	State	Description
C. O.	United States	The steamer, under tow of Oakland (United States), struck "The Big Eddy" off Hickman, Tennessee, parted her towlines, turned sideways, capsized and sank in 100 feet (30 m) of water, a total loss.
Hawk	United States	The steamer careened and capsized in the Ohio River in a gale near Jack's Run. Her pilot was killed. The vessel was raised and repaired.

=== 15 March ===
List of shipwrecks: 15 March 1897
Ship	State	Description
Ville de Saint Nazaire	France	The 2,640-gross register ton steamer foundered in the North Atlantic Ocean off Cape Hatteras, North Carolina, during a storm with the loss of 80 lives. The 648-gross register ton schooner Hilda (United States) rescued her four survivors from a lifeboat on 22 March; they were all that remained alive out of 38 people who had boarded the lifeboat when Ville de Saint Nazaire sank.

=== 17 March ===
List of shipwrecks: 17 March 1897
Ship	State	Description
Sunol	United States	The sternwheel passenger steamer was capsized and sunk in a collision with barque Olympic (United States) in San Francisco Bay near Alcatraz Island. All 45 passengers and 16 crew transferred to Olympic before she sank by stepping across the decks. Later raised.
Unidentified schooner	Greece	International intervention in Crete: Attempting to reach Crete with a cargo of munitions and manned by Cretan insurgents, the schooner was sunk off Cape Dia, Crete, in an exchange of gunfire with the torpedo cruiser SMS Sebenico (Austro-Hungarian Navy), which was operating as part of the International Squadron intervening in the Cretan rebellion against rule by the Ottoman Empire. The schooner's crew suffered no casualties and swam to shore on Crete.

=== 18 March ===
List of shipwrecks: 18 March 1897
Ship	State	Description
Little Sandy	United States	The steamer was carried by wind and current into a lock wall at Lock No. 2 on the Kentucky River. She was towed off, but sank a short distance down river.

=== 19 March ===
List of shipwrecks: 19 March 1897
Ship	State	Description
Willapa	United States	The steamer was stranded on Regatta Reef in Southeast Alaska.

=== 22 March ===
List of shipwrecks: 22 March 1897
Ship	State	Description
Fidget	United States	The steamer was sunk in a collision with Asa W. Hughes (United States), Philadelphia. Crew rescued by Asa W. Hughes.

=== 25 March ===
List of shipwrecks: 25 March 1897
Ship	State	Description
Fred Nellis	United States	The steamer burned at Brooklyn, Illinois, a total loss.

=== 28 March ===
List of shipwrecks: 28 March 1897
Ship	State	Description
Amelia	United States	The sloop foundered during a storm off the Bell Buoy in Pensacola Bay, Florida. Eight of nine people aboard lost.

=== 30 March ===
List of shipwrecks: 30 March 1897
Ship	State	Description
El Rio Rey	United States	The steamer filled and sank at the Memphis Wharf at the foot of Beale Street, Memphis, Tennessee, in a violent storm, a total loss.
Kinkora	United Kingdom	During a voyage with a cargo of lumber from Vancouver, British Columbia, Canada, to London, the merchant ship — an iron-hulled sailing ship — was wrecked on a reef off Clipperton Island in the Pacific Ocean. All 23 hands reached shore safely. On 17 May, seven crewmen set out on a 700-nautical-mile (1,300 km; 810 mi) voyage in an open boat to Acapulco, Mexico, which they reached on 3 June after 15 days at sea. The third-class cruiser HMS Comus (Royal Navy) rescued the rest of the crew from Clipperton Island about 40 days after the wreck.

=== 31 March ===
List of shipwrecks: 31 March 1897
Ship	State	Description
City of Columbus	United States	The steamer struck rocks and sank in Smith's Bend two miles (3.2 km) above Gordon, Alabama on the Chattahoochee River, a total loss.

== April ==
=== 1 April ===
List of shipwrecks: 1 April
Ship	State	Description
J. F. C. Griggs	United States	The steamer struck an embedded log and sank at Barnett's Landing in the Chattahoochee River, a total loss. Her chief engineer and two other crewmen were killed. Her machinery was salvaged.

=== 2 April ===
List of shipwrecks: 2 April 1897
Ship	State	Description
Clifton	United States	The steamer sank overnight at the Pittsburgh Wharf. Raised and repaired.

=== 3 April ===
List of shipwrecks: 3 April 1897
Ship	State	Description
R. T. Coles	United States	The steamer took a shear in King's Eddy and struck the bluff tearing a hole in her starboard side and she sank in 10 feet (3.0 m) of water in the Cumberland River.

=== 5 April ===
List of shipwrecks: 5 April 1897
Ship	State	Description
Assaye	United Kingdom	The cargo ship was wrecked on Blonde Rock, off Cape Sable Island, Nova Scotia, Canada.
John W. Hart	United States	The steamer struck an obstruction in the Cumberland River near Granville, Tennessee and was beached. She caught fire and burned to the water's edge.

=== 7 April ===
List of shipwrecks: 7 April 1897
Ship	State	Description
James and Agnes	United Kingdom	The schooner struck the Scarweather Sands, in the Bristol Channel and was consequently beached in Black Rock Bay. Her five crew were rescued.

=== 9 April ===
List of shipwrecks: 9 April 1897
Ship	State	Description
Bonita	United States	The fishing schooner foundered off the Plymouth Light. Her crew was saved.
Nellie Smith	United States	The barkentine was sunk in a collision in thick fog with steamer La Grande Duchesse (United States) off the Fenwick Shoal Lightship. Three crew rescued by La Grande Duchesse; her captain and four crewmen killed.

=== 11 April ===
List of shipwrecks: 11 April 1897
Ship	State	Description
Yaquina	United States	The freighter grounded on a bar off a wharf at Hueneme, California causing her to flood and sink, abandoned as a total loss.

=== 12 April ===
List of shipwrecks: 12 April 1897
Ship	State	Description
Howard P. Simmons	United States	The steamer struck a snag and sank in the Crooked River. Later raised.

=== 16 April ===
List of shipwrecks: 16 April 1897
Ship	State	Description
Charles H. Taylor	United States	The fishing schooner wrecked on Sable Island, Nova Scotia. Her crew rowed to safety in her dories.
Ibex	United Kingdom	The GWR-owned ship struck the Noirmontaise rocks off Jersey, Channel Islands and was beached in Portlet Bay, Jersey. She was refloated and re-entered service.

=== 17 April ===
List of shipwrecks: 17 April 1897
Ship	State	Description
Therese	United States	Carrying a cargo of about 10 tons of general merchandise, seven passengers, and a crew of six, the 74.45-gross register ton, 77.8-foot (23.7 m) schooner was wrecked without loss of life at 57°43′N 155°28′W in Puale Bay (57°41′N 155°29′W), sometimes also called "Cold Bay," on the coast of the District of Alaska during a gale.

=== 19 April ===
List of shipwrecks: 19 April 1897
Ship	State	Description
ARA Santa Fe	Argentine Navy	The Corrientes-class destroyer was wrecked in the River Plate off Colonia del Sacramento, Uruguay.

=== 27 April ===
List of shipwrecks: 27 April 1897
Ship	State	Description
Wanderer	United States	The steamer burned to the waterline at dock when a nearby burning warehouse exploded and she was enveloped in flames at Newport News, Virginia. Two crewmen drowned.

=== 29 April ===
List of shipwrecks: 29 April 1897
Ship	State	Description
Ada	New South Wales	The ketch was wrecked at Newcastle, New South Wales, Australia.
Lookout	United States	Lookout The three-masted schooner was on a voyage in ballast from Chicago, Illinois, to Masonville in Little Bay de Noc, Michigan, when she was stranded during a gale on the coast of Lake Michigan 200 yards (183 m) off Rawley Point on the coast of Wisconsin, approximately 5 miles (8 km) north of Two Rivers, Wisconsin. Her crew of seven reached shore safely. Her wreck lies in 10 feet (3 m) of water at 44°11.707′N 087°30.596′W, and is within the Wisconsin Shipwreck Coast National Marine Sanctuary.

=== Unknown date ===
List of shipwrecks: Unknown date 1897
Ship	State	Description
Barga	Belgium	The steamer was declared missing, having departed Huelva, Spain, for Antwerp, Belgium, on 30 March.

== May ==
=== 1 May ===
List of shipwrecks: 1 May 1897
Ship	State	Description
Ability	New South Wales	The ketch was driven ashore along with four other ships at Cape Hawke Bay, Australia, during a storm.

=== 3 May ===
List of shipwrecks: 3 May 1897
Ship	State	Description
Bruxelles	Belgium	The steamer ran aground on St. Pierre Island, Seychelles, a total loss.
Collynie	United Kingdom	The coasters Collynie and Girnigoe (United Kingdom) were in collision about three miles (4.8 km) off the Girdle Ness Lighthouse, Aberdeen Bay, Scotland. Collynie (Methil for Aberdeen with coal) sank quickly. The master was the sole survivor; his wife and two young sons as well as the crew of eight drowned.
L. B. Gilchrist	United States	The barge, under tow of Right Arm (United States), sank five miles (8.0 km) southeast of Montauk Point. The crew were rescued by Right Arm.

=== 5 May ===
List of shipwrecks: 5 May 1897
Ship	State	Description
General Siglin	United States	The 81-ton, 80-foot (24.4 m) sealing schooner was sighted by the sealing schooner Willard Ainsworth (United States) in the North Pacific Ocean at 53°15′N 135°55′W in a waterlogged condition, dismasted, with her bulwarks stove in and her boats missing. Ordered to search for General Siglin after Williard Ainsworth reported the sighting, the revenue cutter USRC Thomas Corwin ( United States Revenue Cutter Service) found her again on 14 June with the body of her first mate and a young boy on board, but the bodies of the other seven people who had been aboard were never found. General Siglin was salvaged and returned to service.
Talfer	United States	The schooner-yacht was sunk in a collision in thick fog with steamer City of Fitchburg (United States) off Falkner Island in Long Island Sound. The crew were rescued by City of Fitchburg after abandoning ship in her boat.

=== 6 May ===
List of shipwrecks: 6 May 1897
Ship	State	Description
Plow Boy	United States	The passenger steamer struck a snag below De Witt, Missouri and sank in the Missouri River, a total loss. Her machinery was salvaged.

=== 8 May ===
List of shipwrecks: 8 May 1897
Ship	State	Description
Gwendoline	Canada	The steamer struck rocks and the wrecked Ruth United States an hour after Ruth had wrecked in the Upper Kootenai River going through "Jennings Canyon" five miles (8.0 km) above Jennings, Montana. Later raised and taken to Jennings for repair.
Maggie	United States	The steamer was destroyed by fire at dock at Conway, South Carolina.
Ruth	United States	The steamer struck rocks in the Upper Kootenai River going through "Jennings Canyon" five miles (8.0 km) above Jennings, Montana when a log jammed her rudder, a total loss.

=== 9 May ===
List of shipwrecks: 9 May 1897
Ship	State	Description
Annie E. Rudolph	United States	The schooner was sunk in a collision with the tug Paoli (United States) off Cape Cod, or Nauset Light, in 50 feet (15 m) of water with her mast tops above water, but a total loss. Her captain and two crewmen died. Two crewmen were rescued by Paoli.

=== 10 May ===
List of shipwrecks: 10 May 1897
Ship	State	Description
May	United States	The steamer sank in a gale at Bolivar Point, Galveston Bay, Texas, a total loss.

=== 16 May ===
List of shipwrecks: 16 May 1897
Ship	State	Description
Alfred Mosher	United States	The 70.8-foot (21.6 m), 37.74-gross register ton steam screw tug caught fire while moored to a pier at Sturgeon Bay, Wisconsin. The tug Nelson (United States) towed Alfred Mosher away from the pier, after which he was sprayed with water until she filled and sank in the vicinity of 44°50.095′N 087°23.460′W, a total loss. Her boiler was salvaged in August 1912, and part of her stern was dredged to the surface in 1933, at which time her steam engine was salvaged before the stern was allowed to sink again.

=== 18 May ===
List of shipwrecks: 18 May 1897
Ship	State	Description
Ida	United States	The canal boat, under tow by steamer G. H. Notter (United States) was sunk in a collision with a car float under tow by the steamer Transfer No. 10 (United States) off Roosevelt Street, New York City, New York, in the East River.

=== 21 May ===
List of shipwrecks: 21 May 1897
Ship	State	Description
Florida	United States	The cargo steamer, a wooden package freighter, was in Lake Huron carrying a cargo of flour, barrels of whiskey, syrup, and various manufactured goods, when the cargo ship George W. Roby (United States) accidentally rammed her in dense fog off Presque Isle, Michigan between False Presque Isle and Middle Island. She sank in 206 feet (63 m) of water at 45.29635°N 83.283517°W.

=== 31 May ===
List of shipwrecks: 31 May 1897
Ship	State	Description
Arctic	United States	The Alaska Commercial Company sternwheel paddle steamer was destroyed at Circle City, District of Alaska, by the spring breakup of ice on the Yukon River.

== June ==
=== 2 June ===
List of shipwrecks: 2 June 1897
Ship	State	Description
Pottsville	United States	The steamer grounded at a wharf in Beverly, Massachusetts and filled. Raised and repaired.

== 9 June ==
List of shipwrecks: 9 June 1897
Ship	State	Description
Aden	United Kingdom	The steamship sank on the eastern coast of Socotra while carrying passengers from Colombo, Ceylon, to London.

=== 12 June ===
List of shipwrecks: 12 June 1897
Ship	State	Description
Gangut	Imperial Russian Navy	The coast defense ship struck an uncharted rock and sank in the Gulf of Finland.

=== 14 June ===
List of shipwrecks: 14 June 1897
Ship	State	Description
Lulu B. Crammer	United States	The steamer's condenser pipe developed a leak and she was put ashore on Tinicum Island to make repairs. She caught fire and burned to the waterline.

=== 15 June ===
List of shipwrecks: 15 June 1897
Ship	State	Description
Clara Cavett	United States	The steamer struck a snag near Pittsburgh in the Ohio River springing a bad leak. She was run onto a bar and sank up to her main deck. Raised and repaired.

=== 16 June ===
List of shipwrecks: 16 June 1897
Ship	State	Description
HMS Foudroyant	United Kingdom	HMS Foudroyant The training ship, a former ship-of-the-line, was driven ashore at Blackpool, Lancashire, England, and wrecked.

=== 18 June ===
List of shipwrecks: 18 June 1897
Ship	State	Description
David Kemps	United States	The steamer was destroyed by fire in Black Creek off the St. Johns River.

=== 20 June ===
List of shipwrecks: 20 June 1897
Ship	State	Description
Hattie	United States	The schooner was sunk in a collision with Dorchester (United States) near Smiths Point Light.

=== 21 June ===
List of shipwrecks: 21 June 1897
Ship	State	Description
Cadet	United States	The steamer grounded at a wharf in Lynn, Massachusetts and sank. Raised and repaired.

=== 25 June ===
List of shipwrecks: 25 June 1897
Ship	State	Description
Christie and Mabel	United States	The fishing sloop was sunk in a collision with State of Maine (United States) near Monhegan Island. Her crew of two were saved by State of Maine.
William O. Lowery	United States	The schooner was sunk in a collision with the tug Chicago (United States) near Poplar Island in Chesapeake Bay.

=== 30 June ===
List of shipwrecks: 30 June 1897
Ship	State	Description
Harry F. Browder	United States	The steamer was sunk in a collision with the barge D. H. Keyes, under tow by Joe D. Dudley (both United States), in the harbor at Duluth, Minnesota.

== July ==
=== 1 July ===
List of shipwrecks: 1 July 1897
Ship	State	Description
Dove	Queensland	The steamer was wrecked three miles (4.8 km) off Cape Tribulation. Raised in November, repaired and returned to service as Jessie.

=== 5 July ===
List of shipwrecks: 5 July 1897
Ship	State	Description
Heathmore	United Kingdom	The Liverpool steamer ran into the Seven Stones Reef at full speed while en route from Santander to Glasgow with 2,400 tons of iron-ore. She floated clear at 8 am and anchored two miles away with the crew pumping water all day. By evening they took to the boats and were picked up by Lady of the Isles as Heathmore sank in 40 fathoms (240 ft; 73 m).

=== 9 July ===
List of shipwrecks: 9 July 1897
Ship	State	Description
Anna L. Russell	United States	The schooner was damaged in a collision with Seth Chapman (United States) off Goose Island and was beached to prevent sinking. One crewman was declared missing.

=== 15 July ===
List of shipwrecks: 15 July 1897
Ship	State	Description
Jim Montgomery	United States	The steamer sprung a leak and sank at dock at Madison, Indiana. Later raised.

=== 17 July ===
List of shipwrecks: 17 July 1897
Ship	State	Description
A. R. Gray	United States	The steamer burned to the waterline while lying at Andalusia, Pennsylvania.

=== 19 July ===
List of shipwrecks: 19 July 1897
Ship	State	Description
Seth Chapman	United States	The tug was passing through Hell Gate when a towline got hung up in her wheel, she drifted onto Mill Rock and sank.

=== 20 July ===
List of shipwrecks: 20 July 1897
Ship	State	Description
Concha	Belgium	The steamer collided with Saint Fillans (United Kingdom) off the Owers Lightship, English Channel and sank.
J. W. Eviston	United States	The steamer was burned to the waterline in the harbor at Duluth, Minnesota.

=== 25 July ===
List of shipwrecks: 25 July 1897
Ship	State	Description
Hester Thomas	United States	The vessel struck an obstruction in the Wabash River and sank in three feet (0.91 m) of water. Later raised and repaired.

=== 26 July ===
List of shipwrecks: 26 July 1897
Ship	State	Description
Advance	New South Wales	While anchored off New South Wales, Australia, in Botany Bay at the entrance to Cooks River, the schooner was driven ashore on Lady Robinsons Beach during a fierce squall after her port anchor chain parted and she dragged her starboard anchor chain. She was refloated, repaired, and returned to service.
Benton	United States	The passenger steamer struck a bridge at Sioux City, Iowa and sank with two holes in her hull, a total loss.

=== 28 July ===
List of shipwrecks: 28 July 1897
Ship	State	Description
Gleaner	United States	The sloop was sunk in a collision with City of Gloucester (United States) in the harbor of Boston, Massachusetts.
Gypsy	United States	The steamer struck a snag in the Upper Willamette River four miles (6.4 km) above Salem, Oregon sinking in eight feet (2.4 m) of water.

=== 31 July ===
List of shipwrecks: 31 July 1897
Ship	State	Description
William M. McDonald	United States	The fishing schooner wrecked at Great Point, Nantucket. Crew Saved.

== August ==
=== 3 August ===
List of shipwrecks: 3 August 1897
Ship	State	Description
Fleming	United States	The schooner was sunk in Chesapeake Bay. Work to remove the wreck was completed on 18 November 1897.

=== 4 August ===
List of shipwrecks: 4 August 1897
Ship	State	Description
River Queen	United States	The steamer was sunk at dock in Detour, Michigan when struck by the barge Martha (flag unknown). Raised and repaired.

=== 5 August ===
List of shipwrecks: 5 August 1897
Ship	State	Description
Leo	United States	The steamer was dragged down and sunk while tied up alongside Mattie Winters (United States) when she filled and sank at Greenville, Mississippi. Later raised.
Mattie Winters	United States	The steamer filled and sank over night due to a leak at Greenville, Mississippi, a total loss. She dragged down Leo (United States) tied up alongside.
Mexico	United States	During a voyage from Sitka, District of Alaska, to Victoria, British Columbia, and ports in Puget Sound in Washington with 70 passengers, 71 crewmen, and a cargo of three tons of general merchandise on board, the 1,797-gross register ton, 265-foot (80.8 m) steam schooner sank in 510 feet (155 m) of water two hours after striking West Devil Rock (54°40′N 131°36′W) in Dixon Entrance on the Canada-United States border between British Columbia and the District of Alaska. Everyone on board reached safety in the ship′s boats.

=== 9 August ===
List of shipwrecks: 9 August 1897
Ship	State	Description
Oakland	New South Wales	The passenger cargo ship ran aground on the bar at Ballina, New South Wales, Australia. She was refloated, repaired, and returned to service.

=== 12 August ===
List of shipwrecks: 12 August 1897
Ship	State	Description
Katy Smith	United States	The tow boat sprang a leak over night and sank at dock in Port Richmond, New York. Raised the next day.
Navarch	United States	Trapped in pack ice in the Chukchi Sea off Icy Cape, District of Alaska, since July 1897, the 494-ton steam whaling bark was abandoned off Blossom Shoals (71°23′29″N 156°28′00″W). Sixteen of her crewmen died while trying to cross the ice and reach shore. Her 16 surviving crewmen were rescued by the revenue cutter USRC Bear ( United States Revenue Cutter Service) and the steamer Thrasher (United States). Navarch eventually drifted in the ice as a derelict to the vicinity of Point Barrow, where she ultimately was burned by salvors in January 1898.
Unknown coal boat	United States	The coal boat was sunk in a collision with the excursion barge Carrier, under the tow of Hot Spur ( both United States), at "Glass House" in the Ohio River. Raised and repaired.

=== 13 August ===
List of shipwrecks: 13 August 1897
Ship	State	Description
Nat Sutton	United States	The tow steamer burned at Providence Dry Dock, Providence, Rhode Island, a total loss.

=== 16 August ===
List of shipwrecks: 16 August 1897
Ship	State	Description
Onward	United States	The tow boat burned at Lucas Landing in the Monongahela River, a total loss.

=== 18 August ===
List of shipwrecks: 18 August 1897
Ship	State	Description
Gov. John A. Dix	United States	The steamer foundered lying at New Orleans, Louisiana, a total loss.

=== 21 August ===
List of shipwrecks: 21 August 1897
Ship	State	Description
Marathon	United States	The fishing schooner sprung a leak and sank off Cape North, Nova Scotia. Crew rowed to safety in her boats.
Ralph	United States	The steamer struck a snag and sank in the St. Francis River two miles (3.2 km) above the mouth of the L'Anguille River. Raised and repaired.

=== 24 August ===
List of shipwrecks: 24 August 1897
Ship	State	Description
Felix	United States	The barge, under tow of Nathan Hale (United States), sank near Quicks Ledge. The crew were rescued by Nathan Hale.

=== 25 August ===
List of shipwrecks: 25 August 1897
Ship	State	Description
White Beaver	United States	The steamer was destroyed by fire at Brownsville, Minnesota.

=== 31 August ===
List of shipwrecks: 31 August 1897
Ship	State	Description
Three Brothers	United States	The schooner was sunk in a collision with Potomac (United States) near Seven Foot Knoll in Chesapeake Bay. Work to remove the wreck completed on 18 November 1897. Her captain drowned.

== September ==
=== 1 September ===
List of shipwrecks: 1 September 1897
Ship	State	Description
Geo. L. Bass	United States	The steamer foundered at Cabin Point, Louisiana when her seams open. Later raised.

=== 6 September ===
List of shipwrecks: 6 September 1897
Ship	State	Description
Unknown barge	United States	The barge, under the tow of William K. Stevenson (United States), foundered in the Niagara River near Strawberry Island. One crewman was killed.

=== 7 September ===
List of shipwrecks: 7 September 1897
Ship	State	Description
Hueneme	United States	During a voyage from Seattle, Washington, to St. Michael, District of Alaska, carrying two passengers, nine crew, and 600 tons of cargo consisting of a steam launch and the lumber and materials to construct two river steamers and a barge, the 346.77-net register ton, 142.3-foot (43.4 m) schooner was wrecked without loss of life in rain and fog at Cape Khituk (54°24′15″N 164°47′30″W) on Unimak Island in the Aleutian Islands.

=== 11 September ===
List of shipwrecks: 11 September 1897
Ship	State	Description
City of Brunswick	United States	The steamer burned to the waterline at dock in Mayport, Florida.

=== 12 September ===
List of shipwrecks: 12 September 1897
Ship	State	Description
Florence	United States	1897 Hurricane No. 2: The steamer sank at dock in a hurricane at Sabine Pass.
Henrietta	United States	The steamer struck an obstruction and sank in four feet (1.2 m) of water in the Ohio River at Five Mile, Ohio. Raised and repaired.
John P. Smith	United States	1897 Hurricane No. 2: The tug broke free from the barge Mexico (flag unknown), capsized and sank in a hurricane in Sabine Pass, later located in Sabine Lake. All on board, her captain, the pilot, and one other crewman died.
J. V. Guillotte	United States	1897 Hurricane No. 2: The steamer sank at dock in a hurricane.

=== 13 September ===
List of shipwrecks: 13 September 1897
Ship	State	Description
Lillie	United States	The steamer burned at dock in Nantasket, Massachusetts, a total loss.

=== 14 September ===
List of shipwrecks: 14 September 1897
Ship	State	Description
Belle Memphis	United States	The passenger steamer struck an obstruction below Chester, Illinois and sank in the Mississippi River, a total loss.

=== 15 September ===
List of shipwrecks: 15 September 1897
Ship	State	Description
Catskill	United States	The steamer was sunk in a collision with St. Johns (United States) off Fifty-Eighth Street, New York City, New York in the North River. Crew and passengers were rescued by St. Johns and a tug. One boy possibly died. Raised, rebuilt and returned to service as City of Hudson.

=== 16 September ===
List of shipwrecks: 16 September 1897
Ship	State	Description
Cordova	United States	The fishing schooner went ashore at Pass Island, Newfoundland. Crew saved.

=== 18 September ===
List of shipwrecks: 18 September 1897
Ship	State	Description
John Rourke	United States	The steamer was destroyed by fire at dock in the Satilla River.

=== 20 September ===
List of shipwrecks: 20 September 1897
Ship	State	Description
Gazelle	United States	The steamer sank at dock in Yalaha, Florida in a storm when she got caught under the dock over night. Raised the next day.

=== 21 September ===
List of shipwrecks: 21 September 1897
Ship	State	Description
Edna	United States	The yacht was sunk at dock in the Milwaukee River when struck by Coe (United States).
James B. Schuyler	United States	The steamer caught fire at dock over night at East Twenty-First Street, New York City. The New York City Fire Department was unable to put out the fire and she sank.
Jessie H. Freeman	United States	The steam whaling bark was crushed by ice in the Seahorse Islands off Point Franklin, District of Alaska in the Arctic Ocean, Two days later she was accidentally set on fire by natives and burned to the water's edge. The whaling steamer Belvedere (United States) rescued her crew.
Orca	United States	The 628-ton three-masted steam whaling bark was crushed by ice in the Seahorse Islands off Point Franklin, District of Alaska, in the Arctic Ocean, sinking three or four days later. The whaling steamers Jessie H. Freeman and Belvedere (both United States) rescued her crew.

=== 22 September ===
List of shipwrecks: 22 September 1897
Ship	State	Description
Jessie H. Freeman	United States	The 516-ton steam whaling bark was crushed in ice and abandoned in the Chukchi Sea off the Seahorse Islands (70°53′N 158°42′W) off the coast of the District of Alaska. Her crew survived. Eskimos later accidentally burned the vessel, and she sank.
R. L. Mabey	United States	The steamer was destroyed by fire at dock at Brunswick, Georgia.
SMS S26	Imperial German Navy	The S24-class torpedo boat sank in a storm at the mouth of the Elbe off Cuxhaven, Germany.

=== 28 September ===
List of shipwrecks: 28 September 1897
Ship	State	Description
Glance	United States	The steamer was crowded by Gazelle (United States) that was trying to pass in Buffalo Creek causing her to tip enough to fill and sink. Her engineer was killed.

=== 29 September ===
List of shipwrecks: 29 September 1897
Ship	State	Description
HMS Lynx	Royal Navy	The Ferret-class destroyer ran aground on Dodman Point, Cornwall, England, in fog. She managed to refloat herself and limped to Devonport.
HMS Thrasher	Royal Navy	The Quail-class destroyer ran aground on Dodman Point, Cornwall, England, in fog. She was escorted to Falmouth, Cornwall, and eventually made it to Devonport for repairs.

=== Unknown date ===
List of shipwrecks: unknown September 1897
Ship	State	Description
John M. Abbott	United States	The laid up steamer sprung a leak and sank at Phillip, Mississippi. Total loss.

== October ==
=== 1 October ===
List of shipwrecks: 1 October 1907
Ship	State	Description
Idaho	United States	The 81-gross register ton schooner was stranded on Great Gull Isle on the coast of Maine. All three people on board survived.

=== 2 October ===
List of shipwrecks: 2 October 1897
Ship	State	Description
Mary Morton	United States	The passenger steamer struck an obstruction at Tower Island, Illinois and sank, a total loss.

=== 3 October ===
List of shipwrecks: 3 October 1897
Ship	State	Description
Rowena Lee	United States	The steamer struck a snag and sank in 12 feet (3.7 m) of water at Ashleys Point, Arkansas. Raised and repaired.

=== 6 October ===
List of shipwrecks: 6 October 1897
Ship	State	Description
Commodore Duryea	United States	The steamer was sunk in a collision with City of Chester (United States) in dense fog at Norfolk, Virginia.
Sallie	United States	The steamer was sunk in a collision with Old Point Comfort (United States) in dense fog at Norfolk, Virginia.

=== 7 October ===
List of shipwrecks: 7 October 1897
Ship	State	Description
Antelope	United States	During a voyage under tow by the steamer Hiram W. Sibley (United States) from Sandusky, Ohio, to Ashland, Wisconsin, with a cargo of 1,000 tons of coal, the 186.8-foot (56.9 m), 523.45-gross register ton three-masted schooner barge sank without loss of life in a reported 360 feet (110 m) of water in Lake Superior a few miles from Michigan Island when her seams opened. Hiram W. Sibley rescued her crew. Her wreck was discovered on 2 September 2016.
Mary Me	United States	The schooner was wrecked in a gale on the west end of St. George Island, Florida.

=== 8 October ===
List of shipwrecks: 8 October 1897
Ship	State	Description
Bart E. Linehan	United States	The steamer struck a snag and sank one-quarter mile (0.40 km) above Buena Vista, Iowa in eight feet (2.4 m) of water. Raised and repaired.
Clyde	United States	The tug burned to the waterline and sank while anchored at Tavenier Key, a total loss.
E. B. Hale	United States	The steamer foundered after suffering engine failure in a gale on Lake Huron and got caught in the wave troughs 37 miles (60 km) above Pointe aux Barques Light. After failed attempts to pass tow lines her crew was rescued by Nebraska (United States).

=== 10 October ===
List of shipwrecks: 10 October 1897
Ship	State	Description
Ouida	United States	The steamer foundered on Grand Lake, Louisiana in a gale. Boiler and machinery were scheduled to be salvaged.

=== 12 October ===
List of shipwrecks: 12 October 1897
Ship	State	Description
Daisy	United States	The steamer burned near Clinton, Washington.
May Bryan	United States	The laid up steamer sank at Washington, Missouri in the Missouri River due to dried out seams, a total loss.

=== 16 October ===
List of shipwrecks: 16 October 1897
Ship	State	Description
C. W. Wells	United States	The steamer caught fire on Lake Erie three miles (4.8 km) from Bar Point Shoal Light and burned to the waterline.
New Mattie	United States	The steamer struck a snag and sank near Star Landing, Mississippi in the Mississippi River. Raised and repaired.

=== 17 October ===
List of shipwrecks: 17 October 1897
Ship	State	Description
Alfred A.	United States	The Sloop foundered off Marblehead, Massachusetts in a gale. Two crew died.
Grace Darling	United Kingdom	The 70.3-foot (21.4 m) coasting ketch stranded at Carradale Beach, Carradale, Scotland, a total loss.

=== 19 October ===
List of shipwrecks: 19 October 1897
Ship	State	Description
George R. Ford	United States	The dredge was sunk when her boilers exploded at Charleroi, Pennsylvania in the Monongahela River, a total loss. Her captain and steward were killed.

=== 21 October ===
List of shipwrecks: 21 October 1897
Ship	State	Description
Ida Smith	United States	The steamer caught fire over night, burned to the waterline and sank at Letart Falls, Ohio, a total loss.

=== 23 October ===
List of shipwrecks: 23 October 1897
Ship	State	Description
Caspar	United States	The steam schooner was wrecked on Saunders Reef four miles (6.4 km) south of Point Arena in a gale causing her to capsize and go ashore, a total loss. 13 crew were killed, her captain and 1 crewman survived.
Richard H. Vandecar	United States	The tug was destroyed by fire at dock in Watervliet, New York.

=== 24 October ===
List of shipwrecks: 24 October 1897
Ship	State	Description
Pelican	United Kingdom	Carrying a crew of 40 and a cargo of railroad ties, the 2,338-gross register ton, 327-foot (99.7 m) tramp steamer departed Port Gamble, Washington, on 3 October or Port Townsend, Washington on 12 October (sources disagree) bound for Taku, China, via Yokohama, Japan, and was never seen again after passing Cape Flattery, Washington (although one source claims she was last sighted on 16 October). A message in a bottle later found washed ashore on the coast of the District of Alaska on the Alaska Peninsula in Portage Bay (50°34′N 155°35′W) on 15 May 1899 was from a man known to be aboard Pelican, and it stated that Pelican was sinking in the North Pacific Ocean about 120 nautical miles (220 km; 140 mi) south of Atka Island in the Aleutian Islands at 57°N 175°W and that those aboard were abandoning ship in "frail" lifeboats. Another message in a bottle from the same man found on "Ukomok Island" (probably Chirikof Island in the Gulf of Alaska) on 9 February 1900 identified the date of the sinking as 24 October 1897. Other ships reported a severe gale in the area in which Pelican sank at the time she sank.

=== 28 October ===
List of shipwrecks: 28 October 1897
Ship	State	Description
John W. Dodge	United States	The oyster boat sank at dock at East Providence, Rhode Island when an unknown person boarded and opened her seacock. Raised and found undamaged.

=== 29 October ===
List of shipwrecks: 29 October 1897
Ship	State	Description
Fusō	Imperial Japanese Navy	When a strong gale struck while she was anchored in the Seto Inland Sea off Nagahama, Shikoku, Japan, the central battery ironclad's anchor chain broke and she drifted across the harbor, collided with the ram of the protected cruiser Matsushima, and then struck the protected cruiser Itsukushima (both Imperial Japanese Navy). To keep her from sinking in deeper water, she was run onto a reef, where she sank in shallow water. She was refloated in July 1898 and returned to service in 1900.

=== Unknown date ===
List of shipwrecks: Unknown October 1897
Ship	State	Description
Anne and Mary	United States	The fishing schooner vanished after leaving Southwest Harbor, Maine in mid October, one source believes sank in a gale on the Georges Bank or Grand Banks on 12 November. Lost with all 14 crew.
Hustler	United States	The fishing schooner reported lost on 19 October on the Grand Banks of Newfoundland, or was last sighted on 22 November 25 miles (40 km) south east of Sable Island heading for home. All 18 crew were killed.

== November ==
=== 1 November ===
List of shipwrecks: 1 November 1897
Ship	State	Description
Progress	United States	The dredge burned and sank at the foot of Twenty-Second Street, Pittsburgh, Pennsylvania in the Monongahela River.

=== 5 November ===
List of shipwrecks: 5 November 1897
Ship	State	Description
H. D. Mould	United States	The steamer struck a dike at Reedy Island knocking a hole in her bottom and was beached at Port Penn, Delaware.

=== 6 November ===
List of shipwrecks: 6 November 1897
Ship	State	Description
Idaho	United States	The steamer foundered in a heavy gale of rain and hail in Lake Erie 12 miles (19 km) above Long Point, Ontario in 7 fathoms (42 ft; 13 m) of water. Her Captain and 18 crew died. Two crewmen were rescued by Mariposa (flag unknown) from her mast.

=== 7 November ===
List of shipwrecks: 7 November 1897
Ship	State	Description
Castalia	United States	The steamer struck a piling below a bridge at Sioux City, Iowa in the Missouri River and sank. Later raised and repaired.

=== 8 November ===
List of shipwrecks: 8 November 1897
Ship	State	Description
Vision	United States	The yacht was wrecked in a gale near the Pass A L'Outre Light, Louisiana, a total loss.

=== 11 November ===
List of shipwrecks: 11 November 1897
Ship	State	Description
Hattie T. Brown	United States	The steamer foundered at anchor in a gale in Saginaw Bay.

=== 12 November ===
List of shipwrecks: 12 November 1897
Ship	State	Description
Shirley	United States	The steamer struck an obstruction and sank to just over her main deck below Portsmouth, Ohio in the Ohio River. Declared a total loss after several unsuccessful attempts to raise her.

=== 13 November ===
List of shipwrecks: 13 November 1897
Ship	State	Description
Rover	United States	The steamer struck a snag and sank at Van Lane, Mississippi, a total loss.

=== 14 November ===
List of shipwrecks: 14 November 1897
Ship	State	Description
Janet	United Kingdom	The schooner's towline was cast off by the tug Lord Derby in heavy weather while off Sunderland. Janet was abandoned after being rammed by the Swedish brig Flandern, which the crew got aboard, and their ship was driven ashore south of Sunderland harbour. She was on passage from Exeter to Gateshead, River Tyne, with scrap iron.

=== 17 November ===
List of shipwrecks: 17 November 1897
Ship	State	Description
Progress	United States	The steamer struck the pier of a railroad bridge and sank at Point Perry in the Monongahela River. Raised and repaired.
Ondawa	United States	The tug was destroyed by fire at dock in Watervliet, New York.

=== 18 November ===
List of shipwrecks: 18 November 1897
Ship	State	Description
Bluff City	United States	The sternwheeler passenger/cargo steamer burned at Chester, Illinois in the Mississippi River, a total loss.
Truckee	United States	The steamer was caught in a three-day gale that began on 16 November. She developed a significant leak on 17 November and was wrecked when rising water put out her fires after crossing the bar into Umpqua River on 18 November and went ashore, a total loss. All on board were rescued by the United States Life Saving Service.

=== 22 November ===
List of shipwrecks: 22 November 1897
Ship	State	Description
Dreadnaught	United States	The schooner was sunk in a collision with the tug Col. John F. Gaynor (United States) near the Bartlett Reef Lightship.
F. A. Pike	United States	The schooner was sunk in a collision with Menemsha (United States) in Boston Harbor in 30 feet (9.1 m) of water on the north side of the Main Channel, south of Governor's Island.
Telegraph	United States	The passenger steamer struck the bank 15 miles (24 km) above Louisville, Kentucky with such force that she sank, a total loss.

=== 23 November ===
List of shipwrecks: 23 November 1897
Ship	State	Description
Flirt	United Kingdom	The schooner was driven ashore and wrecked at Burton Bradstock, Dorset with the loss of three of her six crew.

=== 24 November ===
List of shipwrecks: 24 November 1897
Ship	State	Description
Dove	United States	The steamer was destroyed by fire at dock in Toledo, Ohio.

=== 25 November ===
List of shipwrecks: 25 November 1897
Ship	State	Description
Jennie B.	United States	The yacht capsized and sank in the Yazoo River. Her machinery was salvaged.

=== 26 November ===
List of shipwrecks: 26 November 1897
Ship	State	Description
H. E. Runnells	United States	The steamer stranded on Point Abbaye in Lake Superior in a snowstorm. Pulled off on 30 November.

=== 27 November ===
List of shipwrecks: 27 November 1897
Ship	State	Description
J. R. Silliman	United States	The barge, under tow of Gertrude (United States), was sunk in a collision with Lottie (United States) between Watch Hill, Rhode Island and Fall River, Massachusetts. Her captain and a crewman drowned.
Lottie	United States	The schooner was sunk in a collision with the barge J. R. Silliman, under tow of Gertrude (both United States) between Watch Hill, Rhode Island and Fall River, Massachusetts. The crew were rescued by Gertrude.

=== 29 November ===
List of shipwrecks: 29 November 1897
Ship	State	Description
Frank A. Low	United States	The steamer burned to the waterline at Norfolk, Virginia.
Nahant	United States	The steamer caught fire at the Chicago and North West Dock No. 4 at Escanaba, Michigan. The dock caught fire and was destroyed along with 30 ore cars, and she was burned out. Two crewmen killed.

=== Unknown date ===
List of shipwrecks: Unknown date November 1897
Ship	State	Description
Anne and Mary	United States	The fishing schooner vanished after leaving Southwest Harbor, Maine in mid October, one source believes sank in a gale on the Georges Bank or Grand Banks on 12 November. Lost with all 14 crew.
Carrie E. Lane	United States	The schooner sank on the LeHave Bank in the gale of 12–13 November. Crew taken off by J. W. Collins.
Edith H. Koyen	United States	The schooner sank in the vicinity of the Kewaunee, Wisconsin Life Saving Station. Salvage started, with assistance of the United States Life Saving Service, on 21 September 1898 and hauled onto the ways on 28 September.
Hustler	United States	The fishing schooner was reported lost on 19 October on the Grand Banks of Newfoundland, or was last sighted on 22 November 25 miles (40 km) south east of Sable Island heading for home. All 18 crew were killed.
Innisfallen	United Kingdom	The ship sank in a storm in the English Channel near the Goodwin Sands with the loss of eight lives.
John H. McKenzie	United States	The schooner was spoken to a few days before the gale of 12–13 November and probably sank in it. Lost with all 16 hands.
Susan R. Stone	United States	The schooner left Provincetown, Massachusetts on 25 November and vanished. Lost with all 19 hands.

== December ==
=== 1 December ===
List of shipwrecks: 1 December 1897
Ship	State	Description
Egyptian	United States	The wooden cargo ship, a bulk carrier, was on a voyage from Cleveland, Ohio, to Milwaukee, Wisconsin, with a cargo of coal when she caught fire and sank in 230 feet (70 m) of water in Lake Huron off Black River, Michigan, at 44.782539°N 83.190078°W.

=== 2 December ===
List of shipwrecks: 2 December 1897
Ship	State	Description
Friend to all Nations	United Kingdom	The Margate surfboat capsized with the loss of nine of her 13 crew. She was going to the assistance of Persian Empire (United Kingdom).
Persian Empire	United Kingdom	The ship collided with a steamship and was beached on the Margate Sands, Kent. Her crew were rescued by the lifeboat Quiver ( Royal National Lifeboat Institution).
Prince Albert de Belgique	Belgium	The steamer collided at Antwerp, Belgium, with the sailing ship Larnaca (United Kingdom) and sank. She was raised on 6 July 1900.

=== 5 December ===
List of shipwrecks: 5 December 1897
Ship	State	Description
George W. Morley	United States	The steamer, also known as Geo. W. Morley, caught fire from a lantern exploding in the engine room. She was run aground 100 yards (91 m) off Greenwood Avenue, Evanston, Illinois and burned to the waterline, a total loss. Her engine was salvaged in 1898. Her wreck remains where it sank to this day.
Nor'Wester	United States	The 32.52-ton fishing schooner was blown onto rocks and wrecked in Clarence Strait in Southeast Alaska. All on board abandoned ship in a small boat and survived.

=== 6 December ===
List of shipwrecks: 6 December 1897
Ship	State	Description
Cleveland	United States	The steamer broke her shaft off the Columbia River and drifted ashore at Lyall Point, Vancouver Island, British Columbia. Refloated and taken to Quartermaster Harbor arriving on 5 January 1898. Her crew abandoned ship in her boats. One died of exposure. One boat with eight crew aboard disappeared and was lost. 13 crew and 2 passengers survived.
Moro	United States	The freighter broke her rudder crossing the bar into Coquille River and went ashore, a total loss.

=== 7 December ===
List of shipwrecks: 7 December 1897
Ship	State	Description
C. L. Marchal	United States	The lighter filled and sank at dock at the foot of Sixteenth Street, New York City, New York, in the East River due to a tank being allowed to overfill. Raised and drydocked.

=== 9 December ===
List of shipwrecks: 9 December 1897
Ship	State	Description
Winifrede	United States	The steamer caught fire over night, burned to the waterline and sank just below Plymouth, West Virginia in the Great Kanawha River, total loss.

=== 13 December ===
List of shipwrecks: 13 December 1897
Ship	State	Description
W. K. Phillips	United States	The steamer destroyed by fire in the Cumberland River three miles (4.8 km) above Dover, Tennessee.

=== 14 December ===
List of shipwrecks: 14 December 1897
Ship	State	Description
Pargoud	United States	The steamer struck a snag and sank in the Mississippi River near the mouth of the Red River, a total loss.
Stella Wilds	United States	The steamer struck a snag at Ober's Landing, Cross's Post Office, or Schleicher's Landing, 25 miles (40 km) below Natchez, Mississippi in the Mississippi River. Her bow was run onto the bank with the stern sunk in four feet (1.2 m) of water. Later raised.
Susan P. Thurlow	United States	During a voyage from Hillsborough, New Brunswick, Canada, to New York City with a cargo of plaster rock, the 126-foot (38 m), 460-gross register ton three-masted schooner was wrecked during a gale at night on a reef off the south end of Cushing Island in Casco Bay off the coast of Maine with the loss of six lives. Ove crewman survived.

=== 18 December ===
List of shipwrecks: 18 December 1897
Ship	State	Description
Belle	United States	The tow steamer filled and sank at dock at the foot of One Hundred Thirty Third Street, New York City, New York in the Harlem River due to a tank being allowed to overfill.
Grace L. Fears	United States	The fishing schooner was lost off Newfoundland in a gale. All seven crew were killed.

=== 22 December ===
List of shipwrecks: 22 December 1897
Ship	State	Description
Alexandra	United States	Anchored for two years out of commission off Goose Island — more commonly called Aiaktalik Island (56°42′N 154°07′W) — in the Geese Islands in the District of Alaska's Kodiak Archipelago off the south end of Kodiak Island, the 7.66-ton, 35.6-foot (10.9 m) schooner dragged her anchor during a gale and became a total loss. All three people on board survived.

=== 23 December ===
List of shipwrecks: 23 December 1897
Ship	State	Description
W. R. Billups	United States	The bugeye was sunk in a collision with Chesapeake (United States) at Norfolk, Virginia.

=== 24 December ===
List of shipwrecks: 24 December 1897
Ship	State	Description
Galatia	United States	The barge, under the tow of America (United States), foundered in a heavy gale near Chincoteague Lighthouse.
Hotspur	United States	The steamer lost an engine causing her to go over Dam No. 4 on the Monongahela River, and was sunk/wrecked.
Mayflower	United States	The schooner went ashore at Cape Negro, Nova Scotia. Crew saved.

=== 25 December ===
List of shipwrecks: 25 December 1897
Ship	State	Description
Andy Hatcher	United States	The laid up steamer caught fire, burned to the waterline and sank in three feet (0.91 m) of water at Paint Creek near Paintsville, Kentucky in the Big Sandy River, a total loss. Her machinery was salvaged and installed in the mill boat Ray.

=== 29 December ===
List of shipwrecks: 29 December 1897
Ship	State	Description
Charles E. Leland	United States	The tug was destroyed by fire while lying at Coeymans, New York.

=== 30 December ===
List of shipwrecks: 30 December 1897
Ship	State	Description
Clarissa Radcliffe	United Kingdom	The 2,544 GRT steamer was on a voyage from Odesa to Rotterdam with a cargo of grain. The vessel met a gale off Cape St Vincent, the cargo shifted and the vessel sank with the loss of sixteen lives.

=== Unknown date ===
List of shipwrecks: Unknown December 1897
Ship	State	Description
Grace L. Fears	United States	The schooner was last sighted on 17 December, the day before a severe three-day gale set in. Lost with all seven hands.

== Unknown date ==
List of shipwrecks: Unknown date 1897
Ship	State	Description
Cape Horn Pigeon	United States	The 212-ton, 100-foot (30.5 m) whaling vessel was lost at Hakodate, Japan, during the whaling season of 1897.
Margaret and Mary	United Kingdom	The Welsh schooner from Port Dinorwic was lost at Gurnard's Head, Cornwall.
Mortera	Spain	The cargo ship was lost at the entrance to the harbor at Nuevitas, Cuba, in an accident caused by strong tides and currents.
New Racket	United States	The approximately 50-foot (15.2 m) sternwheel paddle steamer was carried away and wrecked in the breakup of ice on the Yukon River in the District of Alaska in the spring of 1897, ending up on a stump about 0.25 miles (0.40 km) into the forest at the back of a blind slough about four miles (6.4 km) above the trading post at Pelly.
Sapphire	United States	The 109-ton sealing schooner caught fire and exploded in the North Pacific Ocean 20 nautical miles (37 km; 23 mi) off Ucluelet, British Columbia, Canada. Her crew of four abandoned ship just before the explosion and survived.
