= Catamarca-class destroyer =

Argentine Navy destroyers, 1912–1959

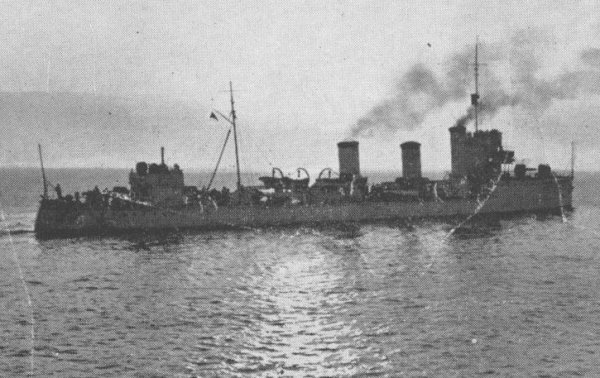
- Jujuy c. 1938

Class overview
- Name: Catamarca-class destroyer
- Builders: Friedrich Krupp Germaniawerft, Kiel, German Empire
- Operators: Argentine Navy
- Preceded by: Corrientes class
- Succeeded by: La Plata class
- Built: 1911–1912
- In commission: 1912–1956
- Completed: 2
- Retired: 2

General characteristics (as built)
- Type: Destroyer
- Displacement: 995 long tons (1,011 t) (normal); 1,357 long tons (1,379 t) (full load)
- Length: 289 ft 2 in (88.1 m) (o/a)
- Beam: 27 ft (8.2 m)
- Draught: 17 ft (5.2 m)
- Installed power: 2 × Thornycroft-Schulz boilers; 25,765 shp (19,213 kW)
- Propulsion: 2 shafts; 2 × steam turbines
- Speed: 27 knots (50 km/h; 31 mph)
- Range: 3,000 nmi (5,600 km; 3,500 mi) at 15 knots (28 km/h; 17 mph)
- Complement: 150
- Armament: 4 × single 4 in (102 mm) guns; 4 × single 21 in (533 mm) torpedo tubes

The Catamarca class consisted of two destroyers built for the Argentine Navy during the 1910s in Germany because Argentina lacked the industrial facilities needed to build them. Completed in 1912, the sister ships were initially assigned duties as training ships. Catamarca spent much of her career as a flotilla leader while Jujuy spent more time in reserve or on training duties. They remained in service until 1947 when they were placed in reserve. The ships were stricken from the navy list in 1956 and sold for scrap in 1959–1960.

== Design and description ==
The Catamarca-class ships were ordered in 1910 as part of a program of a dozen destroyers, two pairs from German shipyards, and four each from Britain and France. The ships had to be ordered from foreign shipyards because Argentina lacked the facilities to build warships of that size itself. The German-built ships were the only ones delivered as the British-built destroyers were sold to the Royal Hellenic Navy in 1912; the French ships were still under construction when World War I began in August 1914 and were purchased by the French Navy. The Catamarcas were 289 feet 2 inches (88.1 m) long overall with a beam of 27 feet (8.23 m) and a draught of 17 feet (5.18 m). The ships displaced 995 long tons (1,011 t) at normal load and 1,357 long tons (1,379 t) at full load. They were powered by two Curtis-AEG steam turbines, each driving one propeller shaft using steam provided by two mixed-firing Thornycroft-Schulz boilers that used both coal and fuel oil. The turbines, rated at 25,765 shaft horsepower (19,213 kW), were intended to give a maximum speed of 27 knots (50 km/h; 31 mph). The destroyers carried 250 long tons (254 t) of coal and 110 long tons (112 t) of fuel oil to give them a range of 3,000 nautical miles (5,600 km; 3,500 mi) at 15 knots (28 km/h; 17 mph).

The main armament of the Catamarca class consisted of four 50-caliber 4-inch (102 mm) guns in single mounts. One gun was located on the forecastle, another between the rear and center funnels and the final pair before and after of the rear superstructure. The ships were also armed with four 21-inch (533 mm) torpedo tubes on rotating single mounts, two on each broadside amidships. The ships' complement consisted of 150 officers and men.

== Ships ==
Construction data
Ship	Builder	Laid down	Launched	Commissioned	Fate
ARA Catamarca	Friedrich Krupp Germaniawerft, Kiel	1911	1911	13 April 1912	Scrapped, 1959
ARA Jujuy	Friedrich Krupp Germaniawerft, Kiel	1911	4 March 1912	15 April 1912	Sold for scrap, 1960

== Sources ==
- Arguindeguy, Pablo E. Apuntes sobre los buques de la Armada Argentina (1810–1970). Comando en Jefe de la Armada, Buenos Aires, 1972. OCLC 5730374 (in Spanish)
- Scheina, Robert L. (1985). "Argentina". In Gray, Randal (ed.). Conway's All the World's Fighting Ships 1906–1921. Annapolis, Maryland: Naval Institute Press. pp. 400–403. ISBN 0-85177-245-5.
