= Hurricane Fiona =

Category 4 Atlantic hurricane in 2022

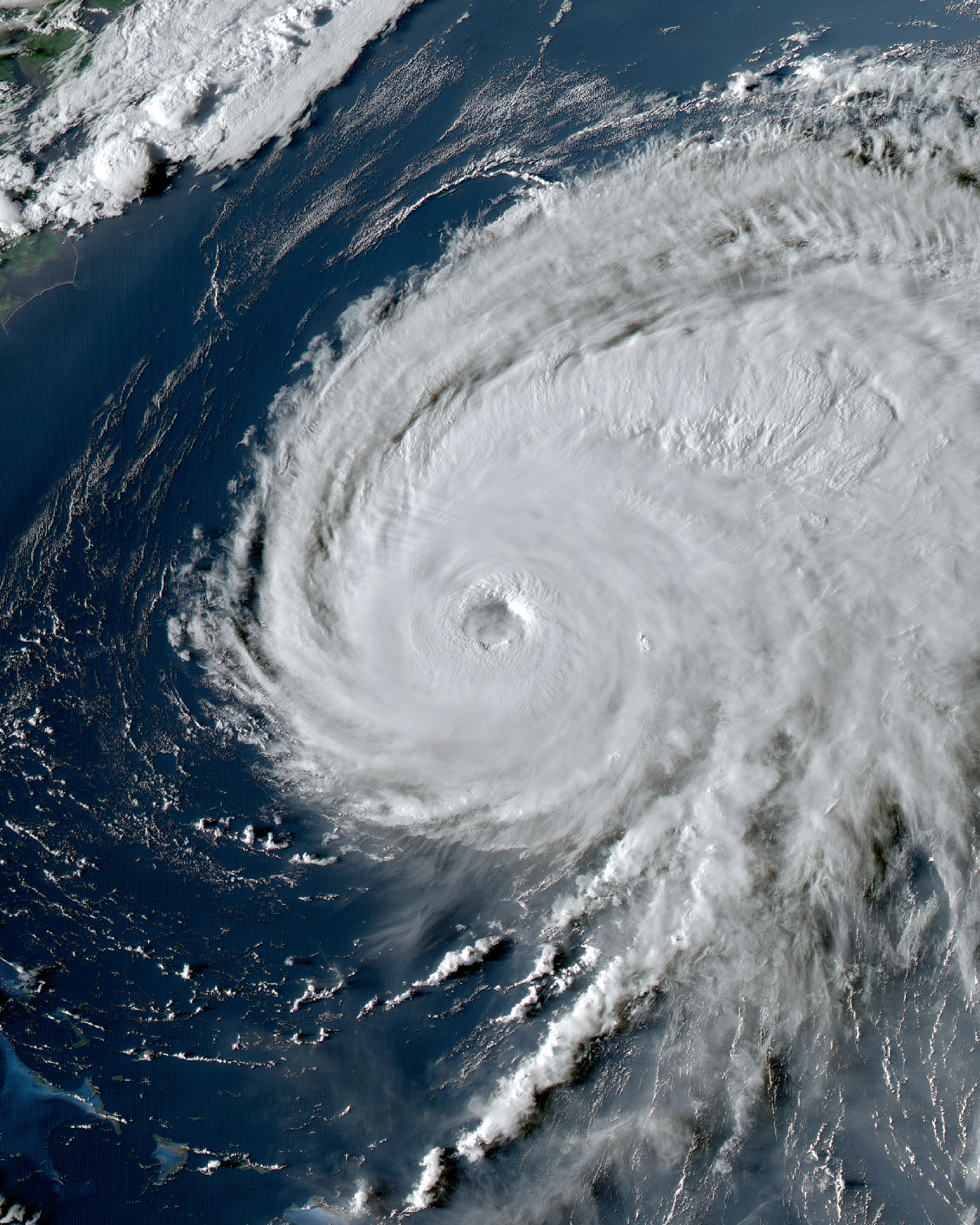
- Hurricane Fiona southwest of Bermuda near its secondary peak intensity on September 22

Meteorological history
- Formed: September 14, 2022
- Extratropical: September 24, 2022
- Dissipated: September 27, 2022

Category 4 major hurricane
- 1-minute sustained (SSHWS/NWS)
- Highest winds: 140 mph (220 km/h)
- Lowest pressure: 931 mbar (hPa); 27.49 inHg

Overall effects
- Fatalities: 29 (7 direct, 22 indirect)
- Damage: ≥$3.09 billion (2022 USD) (Second costliest tropical cyclone in Canadian history)
- Areas affected: Leeward Islands, Puerto Rico, Dominican Republic, Lucayan Archipelago, Bermuda, Atlantic Canada
- IBTrACS /
- Part of the 2022 Atlantic hurricane season

Hurricane Fiona was a large, powerful, and destructive tropical cyclone in mid-to-late September 2022. The storm affected many Caribbean countries, Bermuda, and Atlantic Canada. It caused at least 29 deaths and 3 billion US dollars in damages across 7 countries, with the majority of deaths and damage occurring in Puerto Rico. It was the most intense post-tropical cyclone to hit Canada on record, and also the costliest cyclone to hit Canada until this record was broken by Debby in 2024. It was the sixth named storm, third hurricane and first major hurricane of the 2022 Atlantic hurricane season.

Fiona developed from a tropical wave that emerged from West Africa, before developing into a tropical depression east of the Leeward Islands on September 14. Though under the influence of moderate to strong wind shear, the system was able to strengthen, becoming Tropical Storm Fiona later that same day. On September 16, Fiona passed over Guadeloupe and entered the Caribbean Sea, where atmospheric conditions improved, and strengthened into a hurricane as it approached Puerto Rico two days later. A few hours afterward, the eye of Fiona made landfall along the southwestern coast of Puerto Rico, near Punta Tocon, between the municipalities of Lajas and Cabo Rojo. The hurricane made landfall in the Dominican Republic shortly thereafter, and then strengthened into the first major hurricane of the season. As the storm slowly moved through the Turks and Caicos, it continued to strengthen and reached Category 4 status the following day, while accelerating north. The storm reached peak 1-minute sustained winds of 140 mph (220 km/h) and a minimum pressure of 931 mbar (27.49 inHg). After passing Bermuda and weakening to Category 3 intensity, Fiona quickly transitioned into a large and powerful extratropical cyclone and struck Nova Scotia with sustained winds of 100 mph (155 km/h) early on September 24. Post-tropical Fiona then quickly weakened as it moved through the Gulf of St. Lawrence and over the southeastern Labrador Peninsula. The remnants then dissipated over the Labrador Sea near the southwest coast of Greenland on September 27.

Guadeloupe received near-record rainfall, leaving 40% of the population without water for a few days. Puerto Rico suffered from the worst flooding since Hurricane Maria of 2017, and an island-wide blackout occurred. A third of the territory's population was left without water, and at least 25 people died. In the Dominican Republic and the Turks and Caicos, the islands were pounded by heavy rainfall and strong winds, causing flooding and blackouts. Fiona was the strongest extratropical cyclone on record to make landfall in Canada based on atmospheric pressure and was one of the wettest ever recorded in the country as well.

== Meteorological history ==
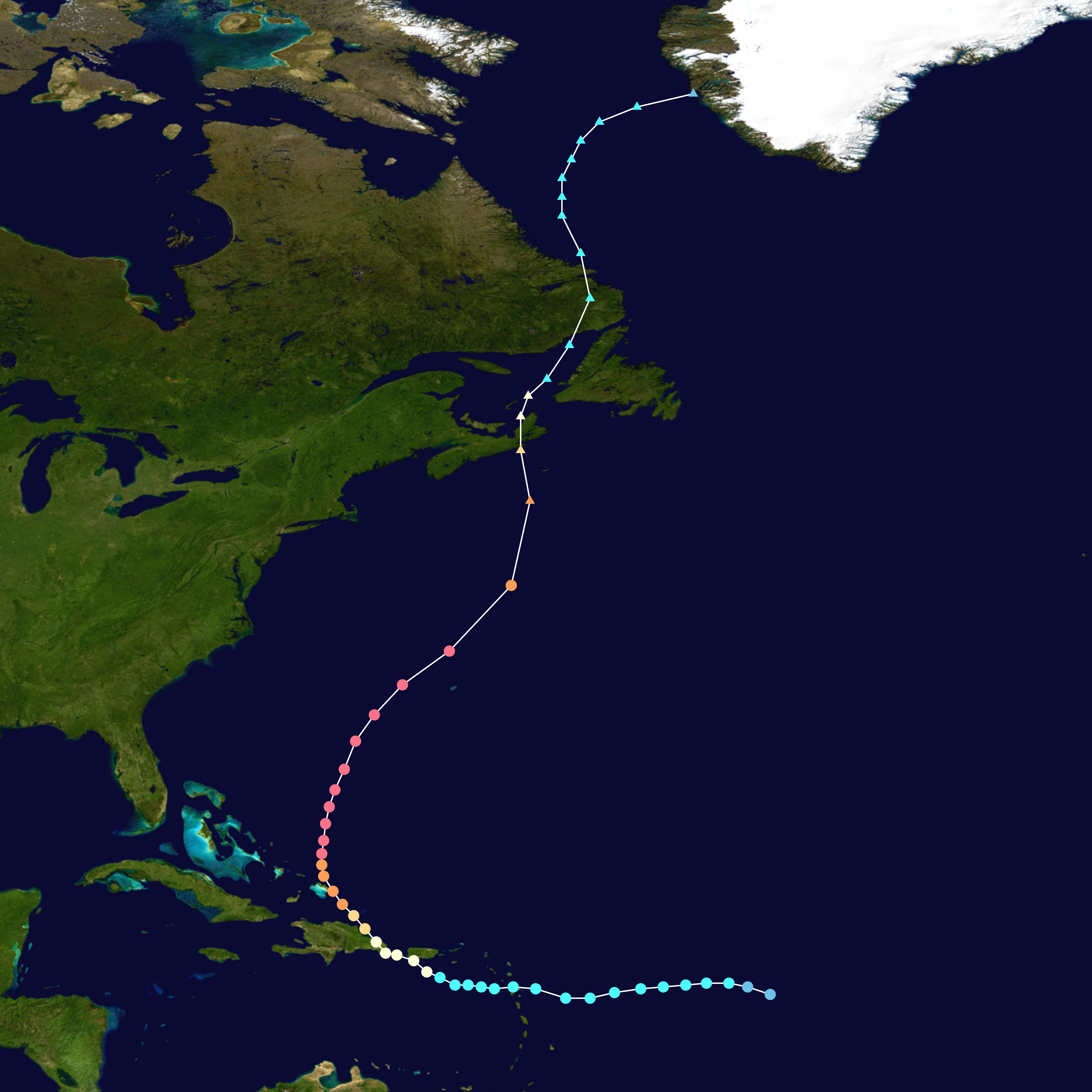
Map plotting the storm's track and intensity, according to the Saffir–Simpson scale Map key Saffir–Simpson scale Tropical depression (≤38 mph, ≤62 km/h) Tropical storm (39–73 mph, 63–118 km/h) Category 1 (74–95 mph, 119–153 km/h) Category 2 (96–110 mph, 154–177 km/h) Category 3 (111–129 mph, 178–208 km/h) Category 4 (130–156 mph, 209–251 km/h) Category 5 (≥157 mph, ≥252 km/h) Unknown Storm type Tropical cyclone Subtropical cyclone Extratropical cyclone, remnant low, tropical disturbance, or monsoon depression

Early on September 12, 2022, the NHC began to monitor a tropical wave over the central tropical Atlantic for gradual development, though environmental conditions for development were assessed as only marginally favorable. Even so, shower and thunderstorm activity within the disturbance began to become more concentrated later that same day, then increased and became better organized during the next day. The circulation associated with the system became more defined and persisted overnight and into the morning of September 14, attaining sufficient organization to designated as Tropical Depression Seven later that day. Despite the continued effects of moderate westerly shear and dry mid-level air flow, new satellite imagery indicated the depression had strengthened, thus at 01:45 UTC on September 15, it became Tropical Storm Fiona.

The storm passed over Guadeloupe with 50 mph (45 kn; 80 km/h) winds on September 16, as it entered the eastern Caribbean. Early on September 18, the storm strengthened into a hurricane as it approached Puerto Rico. A few hours later, the eye of Fiona made landfall along the southwestern coast of Puerto Rico near Punta Tocon between the municipalities of Lajas and Cabo Rojo at 19:20 UTC on September 18, with maximum sustained winds of 85 miles per hour (135 km/h) and a minimum central pressure of 986 mbar (29.12 inHg). The storm emerged over the Mona Passage and strengthened slightly further before making landfall in the Dominican Republic near Boca de Yuma around 07:30 UTC the next morning, with maximum sustained winds of 80 knots (90 mph; 150 km/h) and a minimum central pressure of 977 mbar (28.85 inHg). Fiona weakened slightly over land, but after emerging off the northern coast of the Dominican Republic and back over the Atlantic Ocean, it began to intensify again, reaching Category 2 intensity at 21:00 UTC on September 19.

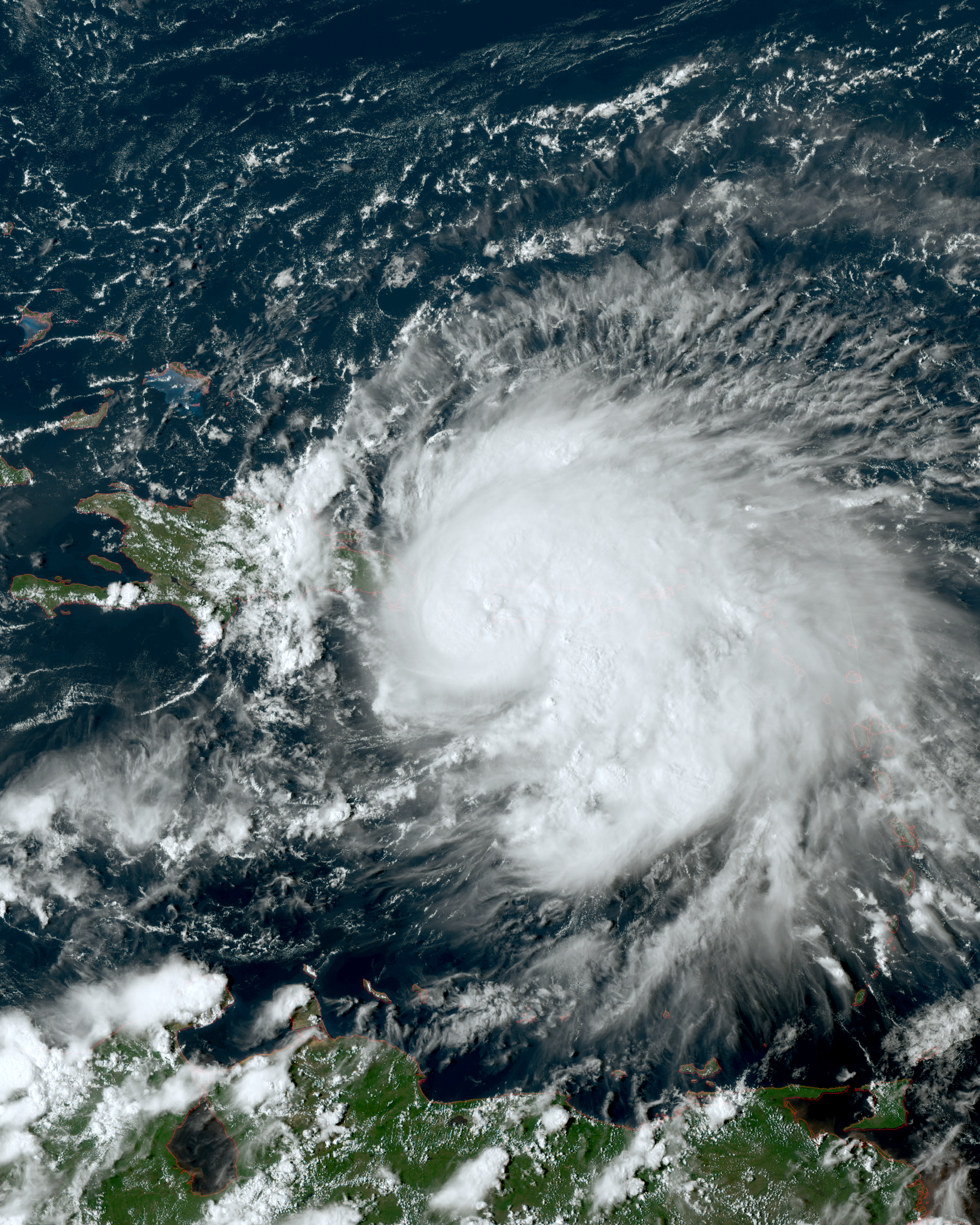
Hurricane Fiona making landfall in Puerto Rico on September 18

Fiona then reached Category 3 intensity at 06:00 UTC the next morning, becoming the first major hurricane of the season. Gradual strengthening continued and Fiona became a Category 4 hurricane at 06:00 UTC September 21. By 00:00 UTC on September 23, Fiona attained a minimum central pressure of 931 mbar (27.5 inHg) (its lowest pressure while a tropical cyclone) at 30.8°N, the lowest such value at this latitude over the North Atlantic Ocean since at least 1979. Fiona then weakened slightly, dropping to Category 3 status at 09:00 UTC, but restrengthened back to Category 4 strength six hours later; at that time, with a central pressure of 936 mbar (27.6 inHg) or lower, the storm was also the most intense Category 4 Atlantic hurricane on record at such a northerly latitude. Six hours later, as it began interact with a mid- to upper-level trough, Fiona began to slowly weaken again and accelerated to the north-northeast at 40 miles per hour (64 km/h), and subsequently became a post-tropical cyclone as it became embedded within the larger-scale trough while still maintaining major hurricane-force winds of 115 mph (185 km/h). Steady weakening continued and by 07:00 UTC on September 24, the center of Fiona made landfall with estimated winds of 100 mph (160 km/h) on the Canso Peninsula, Nova Scotia, near Whitehead; based on observations from a nearby weather station at Hart Island and the East Chedabucto Bay buoy, the central pressure at the time was estimated to have been 931 mbar (27.5 inHg), the lowest measured on record in association with a landfalling post-tropical cyclone in Canada, and a new national record from any storm. Wind gusts across Nova Scotia recorded figures in excess of 160 km/h (99 mph), with Arisaig recording a peak of 179 km/h (111 mph). Extremely large waves reached the Atlantic coast of Nova Scotia late September 24. Buoy data indicated wave heights of 5 to 8 m (16 to 26 ft). The largest offshore waves were near and east of Fiona's path; this was indicated by satellite data and reports from a buoy over Banquereau Bank where waves averaged 12 to 15 m (39 to 49 ft) with peak waves as high as 30 m (98 ft).

Fiona then moved over Cape Breton Island with hurricane-strength winds and hit Prince Edward Island. It continued to weaken as it moved northward into the Gulf of St. Lawrence. When the NHC issued its final advisory on Fiona at 21:00 UTC that same day, it was centered about 80 miles (130 km) northwest of Port aux Basques, Newfoundland, and had maximum sustained winds of 70 mph (110 km/h). Fiona would continue to weaken as it moved erratically northward into the northwestern Atlantic before dissipating west of Greenland over Baffin Bay on September 27.

== Preparations ==
Fiona making landfall in Nova Scotia on September 24

After the naming of Fiona, tropical storm watches were issued for the islands of Saba, St. Eustatius, St. Maarten, Antigua and Barbuda, St. Kitts and Nevis, Montserrat, and Anguilla. These were raised to tropical storm warnings two advisories later with watches extended south to Guadeloupe, St. Barthelemy, and St. Martin. As Fiona moved west, tropical storm watches then warnings were put in place for Puerto Rico and the U.S. Virgin Islands. Parts of the Dominican Republic also had tropical storm watches put in place.

On September 17, the first hurricane watches were put in place for Puerto Rico and soon after, the Dominican Republic. By 14:00 UTC the same day, the hurricane watch in Puerto Rico was upgraded to a hurricane warning with the watch extended to the U.S. Virgin Islands. As a result, Virgin Islands National Park closed.

On approach to Atlantic Canada, Fiona's unprecedented strength prompted the Canadian Hurricane Centre to warn residents of "heavy rainfall" and powerful "hurricane-force winds". The center also called the event "severe". Bob Robichaud, a meteorologist for Environment and Climate Change Canada, said the storm will be one that "everybody remembers". The Kejimkujik National Park temporarily closed due to the extratropical cyclone.

== Impact ==
Impact by country or region
County/Region	Deaths	Damage (USD)	Ref.
Guadeloupe	1	Unknown	
Dominica	0	Unknown	
Puerto Rico	23	>$2.5 billion	
Dominican Republic	2	$471 million	
Turks and Caicos	0	Unknown	
Bermuda	0	Unknown	
Canada	3	>$622 million	
Total	29	≥$3.59 billion	

At least 29 deaths have been confirmed throughout the Caribbean and Canada from Hurricane Fiona as of September 30. The search and rescue team took about two weeks to finish their search of people that were missing.

=== Guadeloupe ===
Wettest tropical cyclones and their remnants in Guadeloupe Highest-known totals
Precipitation			Storm	Location	Ref.
Rank	mm	in	Storm	Location	Ref.
1	582	22.91	Luis 1995	Dent de l'est (Soufrière)	
2	534	21.02	Fiona 2022	Saint-Claude	
3	508	20.00	Marilyn 1995	Saint-Claude	
4	466	18.35	Lenny 1999	Gendarmerie	
5	416	16.38	Philippe 2023	Vieux-Fort	
6	389	15.31	Hugo 1989		
7	318	12.52	Hortense 1996	Maison du Volcan	
8	300	11.81	Jeanne 2004		
9	223.3	8.79	Cleo 1964	Deshaies	
10	200	7.87	Erika 2009		

Guadeloupe received large amounts of rain, at a rate of more than 150 mm per hour in some places where the rivers washed away dozen of roads and bridges, and one person died when his house was washed away in the floods near the Rivière des Pères in the district of Basse-Terre. Firefighters carried out 130 interventions and 23 people were rescued. The cyclonic swell reached 2 to 4 metres (6.6 to 13.1 ft) and the gusts exceeded 90 km/h (56 mph) with a peak of 105 km/h (65 mph) at Baie-Mahault and 98 km/h (61 mph) at Anse-Bertrand. The storm left over 1.000 homeless and the minister Jean-François Carenco declared an area of natural disaster on September 24 for 22 towns.

=== Puerto Rico ===
Wettest tropical cyclones and their remnants in Puerto Rico Highest-known totals
Precipitation			Storm	Location	Ref.
Rank	mm	in	Storm	Location	Ref.
1	1,058.7	41.68	Fifteen 1970	Jayuya 1 SE	
2	962.7	37.90	Maria 2017	Caguas	
3	845.6	33.29	Eloise 1975	Dos Bocas	
4	822.9	32.40	Fiona 2022	Marueno	
5	804.4	31.67	Isabel 1985	Toro Negro Forest	
6	775.0	30.51	Georges 1998	Jayuya	
7	751.8	29.60	San Felipe II 1928	Adjuntas	
8	662.2	26.07	Hazel 1954	Toro Negro Tunnel	
9	652.5	25.69	Klaus 1984	Guavate Camp	
10	596.4	23.48	Hortense 1996	Cayey 1 NW	

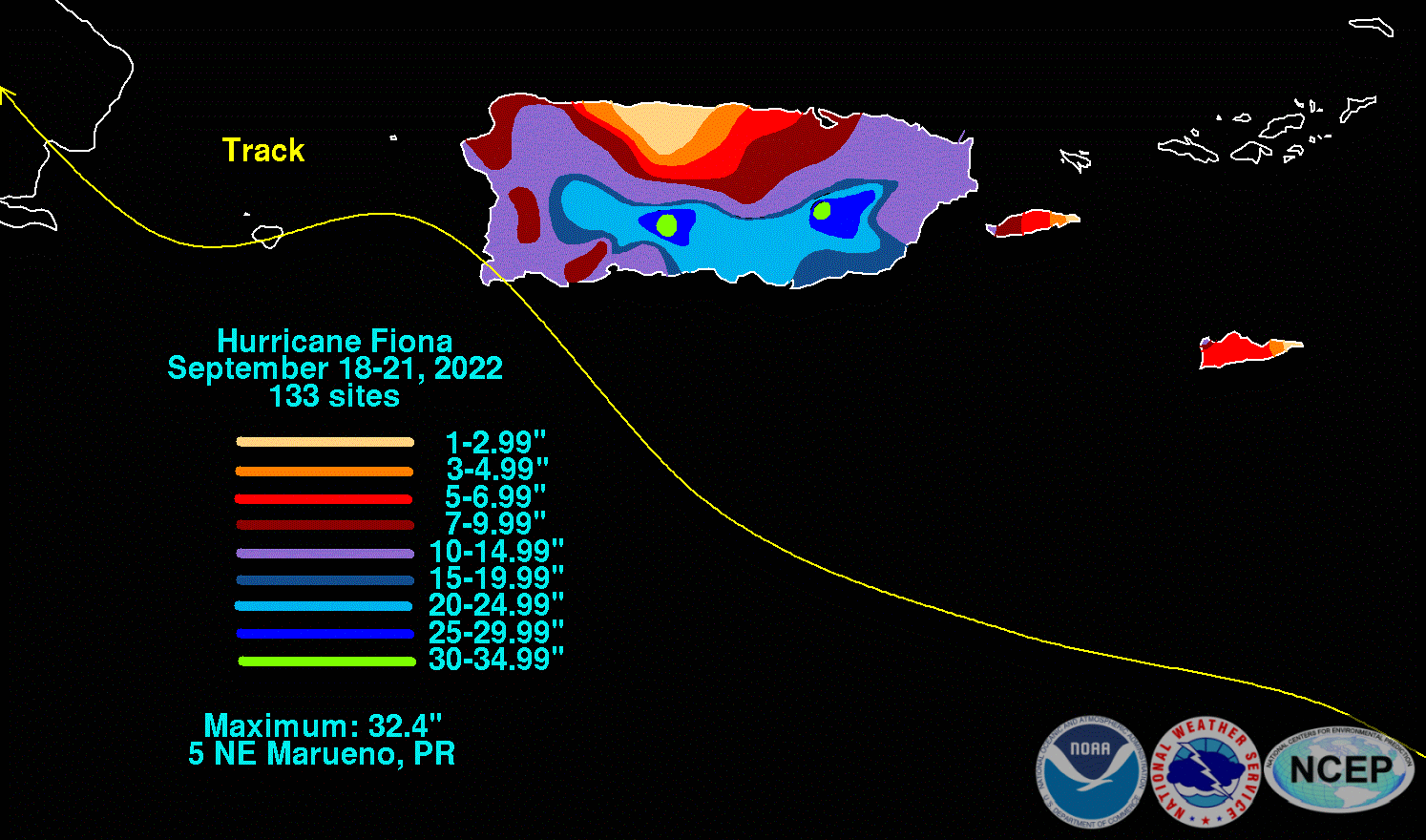
A map of rainfall associated with Hurricane Fiona in Puerto Rico

On September 18, Hurricane Fiona caused a power outage in the entirety of Puerto Rico. All aspects of the grid were damaged, including substations and high voltage power lines. Preliminary assessments indicated the grid suffered more than $2 billion in damage. The winds from the storm covered the entire island bringing heavy rainfall. That day, U.S. President Joe Biden declared a state of emergency over the hurricane. A flash flood warning was declared on September 19. Roads were stripped of pavement due to Fiona's torrential rainfall, roofs were torn off houses, and at least one bridge was completely washed away. A million people, about 33% of the population, were left without drinking water. Two days after the storm, less than 10% of customers had their power restored. A gauge near Ponce measured 31.34 inches (796.0 mm) inches of rain, while winds gusted to as high as 113 mph (182 km/h). Many landslides were recorded throughout the island. Many crops were destroyed, and agriculture secretary Ramón González Beiró forecast a roughly $100 million loss this year. Total damage across the territory was estimated to be $2.5 billion.

U.S. President Joe Biden declared a state of emergency over the storm on September 18, 2022, and all flights to and from Luis Muñoz Marín International Airport were canceled. On the same day, the effects of Fiona's massive rainfall cut off all of the power in Puerto Rico. At least 21 deaths in Puerto Rico have been attributed to the hurricane.

=== Dominican Republic ===
The eye of Hurricane Fiona made landfall along the coast of the Dominican Republic near Boca de Yuma at 07:30 UTC on September 19. It was the first hurricane to make landfall in the country in 18 years.

President Luis Abinader declared state of emergency in five southeastern provinces and three northeastern provinces and visited La Altagracia, El Seibo and Hato Mayor — the most damaged provinces — on September 20, 2022. Over one million people were left without running water and another 350,000 in the country were left without electricity in the country after Fiona had passed. Widespread rainfall totals of 8–16 inches (200–410 mm) drenched the country. At least 2 people were killed and over 8,300 homes were destroyed in the Dominican Republic. Damage from the hurricane was calculated to be 25.1 billion pesos (US$471 million).

=== Turks and Caicos ===
Fiona's eye passed through the Grand Turks island, severely affecting the telecommunications in the archipelago. At least 40% of the territory was left without electricity, with total blackouts reported in North Caicos, Middle Caicos, South Caicos, Grand Turk and Salt Cay. 30% of Providenciales experienced power outages. Moderate damage and no deaths were reported.

=== Antigua ===
During the New Zealand women's cricket team tour of the West Indies in September and October 2022, the three-match Women's One Day Internationals (WODI) had to be rescheduled due to the impact of Fiona. The first WODI, scheduled to be played on September 16, was postponed to September 19 and the remaining two matches also had to be rescheduled.

=== Bermuda ===
Passing west of the island, Fiona's large size produced sustained tropical storm-force winds over Bermuda for several hours; L.F. Wade International Airport reported a gust of 93 mph (150 km/h). Over 80% of the island lost power.

=== Eastern Canada ===
Wettest tropical cyclones and their remnants in Canada Highest-known totals
Precipitation			Storm	Location	Ref.
Rank	mm	in	Storm	Location	Ref.
1	302.0	11.89	Harvey 1999	Oxford, NS	
2	249.9	9.84	Beth 1971	Halifax, NS	
3	238.0	9.37	Igor 2010	St. Lawrence, NL	
4	224.8	8.85	Matthew 2016	Sydney, NS	
5	221	8.70	Debby 2024	Lanoraie, QC	
6	213.6	8.41	Hazel 1954	Snelgrove, ON	
7	212.0	8.35	Fiona 2022	Cape North, NS	
8	210.0	8.26	Earl 2022	Paradise, NL	
9	191.0	7.52	Bertha 1990	Hunters Mountain, NS	
10	185.0	7.28	Sandy 2012	Charlevoix, QC	

Fiona made landfall near Whitehead, Nova Scotia, on the morning of September 24 as a recently transitioned extratropical cyclone with hurricane-force winds. Environment Canada assessed Fiona's maximum sustained winds at the time of landfall to be around 105 mph (169 km/h); these winds would be comparable to a Category 2 hurricane on the Saffir–Simpson scale. It was the strongest storm in Canadian history as gauged by barometric pressure; a pressure of 932.7 mbar (hPa; 27.54 inHg) was unofficially measured on Hart Island, setting the all-time low pressure record for any landfalling cyclone on Canadian shores. The pressure was also potentially lower than any other air pressure measurement along the coast of eastern Northern America outside of the United States Gulf Coast states. Other weather stations also documented pressures below the previous record of 940.2 mbar (27.76 inHg). A peak wind gust of 111 mph (179 km/h) was recorded in Arisaig, Nova Scotia.

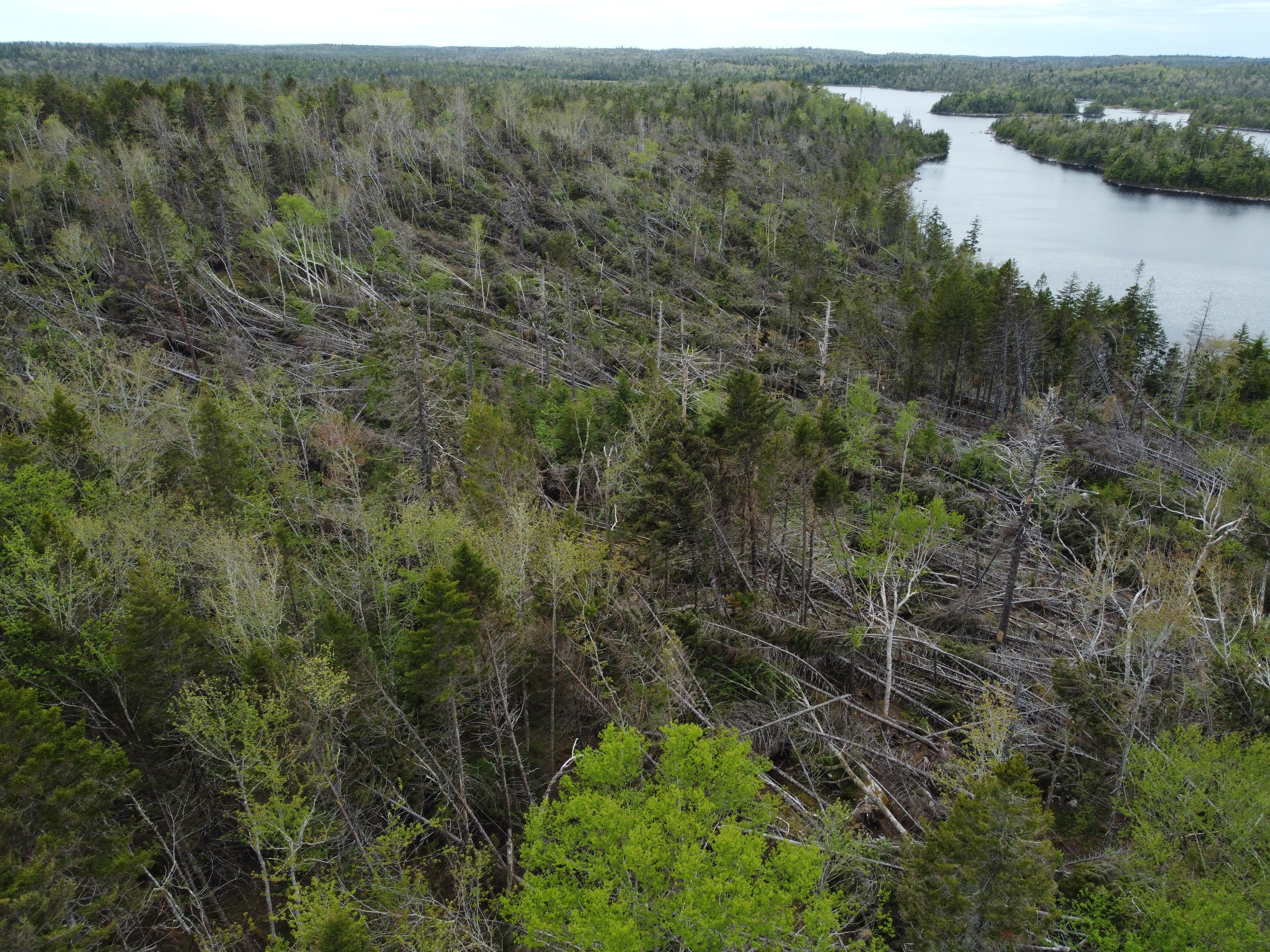
Extensive windthrow from Hurricane Fiona in the Tangier Grand Lake Wilderness Area.

Peak gusts in other Canadian provinces included 110 mph (180 km/h) at Wreckhouse, Newfoundland and Labrador, 93 mph (150 km/h) at East Point, Prince Edward Island, 78 mph (126 km/h) on the Magdalen Islands of Quebec, and 68 mph (109 km/h) on Miscou Island in New Brunswick. Fiona also generated large waves and destructive storm surge, with the highest waves occurring east of the storm's center. A buoy on the Banquereau Bank registered wave heights as high as 98 feet (30 m) along with average wave heights of around 40–50 feet (12–15 m). The onshore push of storm surge led to record water level heights being set at Escuminac, New Brunswick, and Channel-Port aux Basques. Rainfall totals from Fiona were less than anticipated due to the entrainment of dry air into the cyclone. The heaviest rains fell in eastern Nova Scotia, where totals generally ranged between 100–200 mm (3.9–7.9 in).

Fiona affected the four provinces of Atlantic Canada, as well as Quebec. The storm caused major flooding in Quebec's Magdalen Islands, southeastern New Brunswick, Prince Edward Island, northeastern Nova Scotia, and southern Newfoundland. Thousands of trees were knocked down and uprooted in Nova Scotia from Halifax eastward, as well as most of southeastern New Brunswick, most of P.E.I., and some parts in Newfoundland. Wind gusts of 179 km/h (111 mph) were reported in Arisaig, Nova Scotia with a record high water height (before waves) of 2.73 metres (9.0 ft) in Channel-Port aux Basques, Newfoundland. At least 100 homes were damaged or destroyed in Newfoundland, primarily in Channel-Port aux Basques, with more than 200 people displaced. Fiona left more than 500,000 customers without power, including 80% of all Nova Scotia customers and 95% of Prince Edward Island customers. A Port aux Basques woman was killed when her home was destroyed and she was swept into the ocean; another person died of carbon monoxide poisoning while operating an electrical generator in Prince Edward Island. Another man in Lower Prospect, Nova Scotia was swept out to sea and presumed dead. Teacup Rock, a rock formation and local tourist attraction on the coast near Thunder Cove, Prince Edward Island, was destroyed after Hurricane Fiona struck. Fiona also caused severe erosion to the province's dune system, particularly within Prince Edward Island National Park. On September 25, Deputy Premier of Quebec Geneviève Guilbault flew to the Magdalen Islands to view the storm damage.

Damage from Fiona in Canada are estimated to be exceeding C$845 million (US$622 million). This became the costliest weather event in Atlantic Canada history, and the seventh-costliest nationwide (adjusted for inflation).

== Aftermath ==
=== Puerto Rico ===
At least 670 people were rescued from impacted sites following Fiona's deluge. U.S. President Joe Biden approved a disaster declaration for the island, allowing funding for search and rescue, debris removal, and shelter and food among other accommodations for a month. Damage and debris left from Fiona disallowed rescuers and officials from entering affected areas. By September 22, 470 people and 48 pets remained in shelters. Biden's disaster declaration also allowed FEMA to assist survivors in 55 municipalities and for public assistance in all 78 of them. 7 million liters of water, 4 million ready-to-eat meals, more than 215 generators, 100,000 tarps, and more were provided in four warehouses around Puerto Rico. A few days after the hurricane struck, a delegation from United Hatzalah of Israel arrived to provide psychological and emotional stabilization to those affected by the storm in various sections of the island. Working together with local community leaders and organizations including PR4PR, Chabad, and FREMS, the team assisted hundreds of people in the municipalities of Anasco and Loiza providing them with basic medical check ups, and psychological first aid tools to help them cope with the aftermath of the storm. El Yunque National Forest partially re-opened from the storm on October 12.

=== Dominican Republic ===
A few days after the hurricane, New York City mayor Eric Adams visited the Dominican Republic and Puerto Rico. After the visit, he requested a $3.7 billion supplemental bill for emergency and nutritional aid.

=== Retirement ===
Due to the severe damage and number of deaths the hurricane caused across the Caribbean and in Eastern Canada, the World Meteorological Organization retired the name Fiona from its rotating name lists in March 2023, and it will never be used again for another Atlantic tropical cyclone. It was replaced with Farrah, which will first appear on the 2028 season list.

== See also ==
- Weather of 2022
- Tropical cyclones in 2022
- List of Canada hurricanes
- List of Puerto Rico hurricanes
