= ARA Catamarca =

Catamarca-class destroyer of the Argentine Navy, in service from 1912 to 1959

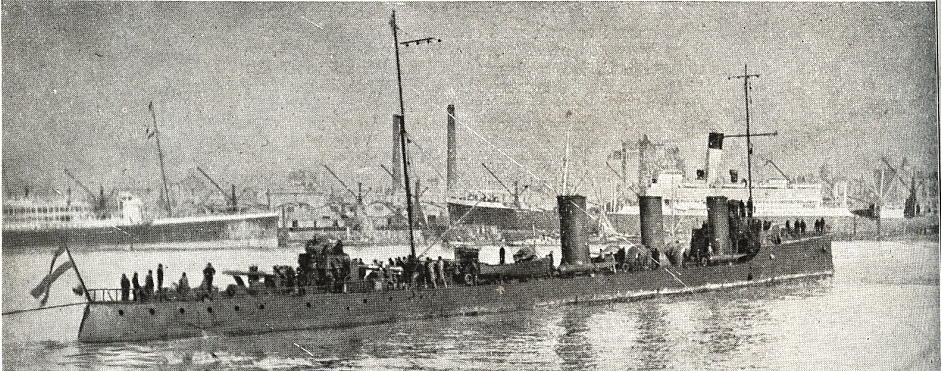
- Sister ship Jujuy in 1912

History

Argentina
- Name: Catamarca
- Namesake: Catamarca Province
- Ordered: 1910
- Builder: Friedrich Krupp Germaniawerft, Kiel
- Launched: 1911
- Commissioned: 13 April 1912
- Out of service: 1947
- Stricken: 10 January 1956
- Identification: Pennant number: D-1
- Fate: Sold for scrap, 1959

General characteristics (as built)
- Class & type: Catamarca-class destroyer
- Displacement: 995 long tons (1,011 t) (normal); 1,357 long tons (1,379 t) (full load)
- Length: 289 ft 2 in (88.1 m) (o/a)
- Beam: 27 ft (8.2 m)
- Draught: 17 ft (5.2 m)
- Installed power: 2 × Thornycroft-Schulz boilers; 25,765 shp (19,213 kW)
- Propulsion: 2 shafts; 2 × steam turbines
- Speed: 27 knots (50 km/h; 31 mph)
- Range: 3,000 nmi (5,600 km; 3,500 mi) at 15 knots (28 km/h; 17 mph)
- Complement: 150
- Armament: 4 × single 4 in (102 mm) guns; 4 × single 21 in (533 mm) torpedo tubes

ARA Catamarca was the lead ship of her class of two destroyers built for the Argentine Navy during the 1910s in Germany. They were constructed there as Argentina lacked the industrial facilities needed to build them. Completed in 1912, the ship often served as a flotilla leader. She was modernized and rearmed during the mid-1920s. Catamarca spent 1932 in reserve, but was reactivated the following year. The ship conducted Neutrality Patrols during the Second World War before being transferred to the River Squadron in 1942. She was permanently reduced to reserve in 1947, discarded in 1956 and sold for scrap three years later.

== Design and description ==
The Catamarca-class ships were 289 feet 2 inches (88.1 m) long overall with a beam of 27 feet (8.23 m) and a draught of 17 feet (5.18 m). The ships displaced 995 long tons (1,011 t) at normal load and 1,357 long tons (1,379 t) at full load. They were powered by two Curtis-AEG steam turbines, each driving one propeller shaft using steam provided by two mixed-firing Thornycroft-Schulz boilers that used both coal and fuel oil. The turbines, rated at 25,765 shaft horsepower (19,213 kW), were intended to give a maximum speed of 27 knots (50 km/h; 31 mph). The destroyers carried enough fuel to give them a range of 3,000 nautical miles (5,600 km; 3,500 mi) at 15 knots (28 km/h; 17 mph).

The Catamarca's armament consisted of four 4-inch (102 mm) guns on single mounts; one on the forecastle, another between the center and aft funnels and the remaining pair fore and aft of the rear superstructure. They were also equipped with four single 21-inch (533 mm) torpedo tubes on rotating mounts, two on each broadside. The ships' complement consisted of 150 officers and men.

== Construction and career ==
Named after Catamarca Province, the ship was ordered from the Friedrich Krupp Germaniawerft shipyard in Kiel, Germany, in 1910 because Argentina could not build warships of that size itself and was launched in mid-1911. She was turned over to the Argentine Navy and commissioned on 13 April 1912. Catamarca arrived in Buenos Aires on 5 July and was initially assigned as the flotilla leader of the Scout Group (Grupo de Exploradores). The destroyer was then transferred to the Training Division the following year and ferried Prince Henry of Prussia from Buenos Aires to Montevideo, Uruguay. The ship's task during this time was to train crewmen for the two Rivadavia-class battleships then under construction in the United States.

Catamarca rejoined the Scout Group in 1915 and was based in Puerto Belgrano before beginning a refit at the Rio de la Plata Arsenal at the end of the year. Prolonged by the lack of a floating crane, her refit was completed sometime in 1916. A nation-wide shortage of coal in 1917 severely limited the destroyer's activities and she was virtually in reserve during the year. The ship was able to resume her normal activities the following year and participated in training maneuvers and gunnery exercises with the other ships of the Scout Group. Catamarca again became leader of the Scout Group in 1920, leading her ships on visits to the river ports of Paraná, Entre Ríos, and Concepción del Uruguay in commemoration of General Justo José de Urquiza.

The ship became the leader of the 1st Division in 1921 and, together with ships from the 2nd Division, Catamarca visited Buenos Aires to celebrate President Marcelo Torcuato de Alvear's inauguration on 12 October 1922. She became an independent ship in 1923 and escorted the river steamer General Alvear conveying the president on a trip upriver. Catamarca visited Rosario, Santa Fe, in August and was placed in reserve and disarmed in November as she began a lengthy modernization. Her boilers were converted to use fuel oil and her coal bunkers were exchanged for oil tanks. The amidships four-inch gun was removed and a pair of 37-millimeter (1.5 in) anti-aircraft guns were installed.

Sea trials occupied most of 1927 and the ship was reclassified as a destroyer. She was assigned to the Scout Division in 1928, training in the Río de la Plata, before being briefly placed in reserve late in the year. Catamarca was reactivated in mid-1929 and made a port visit to Buenos Aires in December. The ship was assigned to the Scout Group in 1930. After the coup d'état in September 1930, Catamarca and the Scout-Torpedo Boat Córdoba patrolled the Río de la Plata during the subsequent unrest in 1931. Catamarca was disarmed and reduced to reserve in 1932, but was reactivated in 1934 and assigned to the 2nd Scout Squadron, visiting Mar del Plata in May. The following year she visited Puerto Madryn. The ship operated in the South Atlantic in 1936 and 1937 and visited Necochea in May 1938.

Catamarca was assigned Neutrality Patrol duties after the beginning of the Second World War in September 1939, but was transferred to the Torpedo Boat Division of the River Squadron in 1942. She was under repair for most of 1945 and visited Necochea in 1946, before being placed in reserve in 1947. The ship was stricken on 10 January 1956 and was sold for scrap at the end of 1959.

== Sources ==
- Arguindeguy, Pablo E. (1972). Apuntes sobre los buques de la Armada Argentina (1810–1970) [Notes on the Ships of the Argentine Navy (1810–1970)] (in Spanish). Buenos Aires: Comando en Jefe de la Armada. OCLC 5730374.
- Scheina, Robert L. (1985). "Argentina". In Gray, Randal (ed.). Conway's All the World's Fighting Ships 1906–1921. Annapolis, Maryland: Naval Institute Press. pp. 400–403. ISBN 0-85177-245-5.
