= ARA Jujuy =

Catamarca-class destroyer of the Argentine Navy, in service from 1912 to 1956

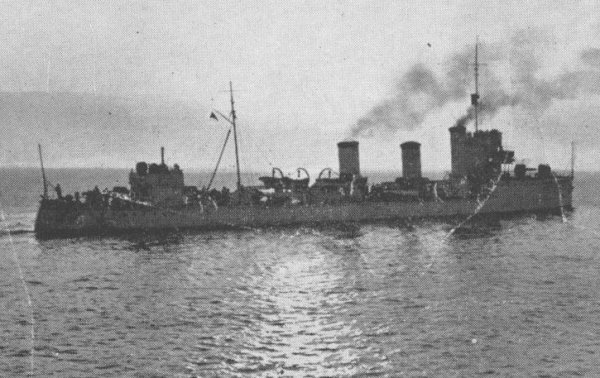
- Jujuy

History

Argentina
- Name: Jujuy
- Namesake: Jujuy Province
- Ordered: 1910
- Builder: Friedrich Krupp Germaniawerft, Kiel
- Launched: 4 March 1912
- Commissioned: 15 April 1912
- Out of service: 1947
- Stricken: 10 January 1956
- Identification: Pennant number: D-3
- Fate: Sold for scrap, 1960

General characteristics (as built)
- Type: Catamarca-class destroyer
- Displacement: 995 long tons (1,011 t) (normal); 1,357 long tons (1,379 t) (full load)
- Length: 289 ft 2 in (88.1 m) (o/a)
- Beam: 27 ft (8.2 m)
- Draught: 17 ft (5.2 m)
- Installed power: 2 × Thornycroft-Schulz boilers; 25,765 shp (19,213 kW)
- Propulsion: 2 shafts; 2 × steam turbines
- Speed: 27 knots (50 km/h; 31 mph)
- Range: 3,000 nmi (5,600 km; 3,500 mi) at 15 knots (28 km/h; 17 mph)
- Complement: 150
- Armament: 4 × single 4 in (102 mm) guns; 4 × single 21 in (533 mm) torpedo tubes

ARA Jujuy was one of two Catamarca-class destroyers built for the Argentine Navy during the 1910s in Germany. They were constructed there as Argentina lacked the industrial facilities needed to build them. Completed in 1912, the ship often served as a training ship. She was modernized and rearmed during the late 1920s. Jujuy was assigned to the active fleet upon the completion of her modernization in 1931 before being transferred to the River Squadron in 1942. She was permanently reduced to reserve in 1947, discarded in 1956 and sold for scrap four years later.

== Design and description ==
The Catamarca-class ships were 289 feet 2 inches (88.1 m) long overall with a beam of 27 feet (8.23 m) and a draught of 17 feet (5.18 m). The ships displaced 995 long tons (1,011 t) at normal load and 1,357 long tons (1,379 t) at full load. They were powered by two Curtis-AEG steam turbines, each driving one propeller shaft using steam provided by two mixed-firing Thornycroft-Schulz boilers that used both coal and fuel oil. The turbines, rated at 25,765 shaft horsepower (19,213 kW), were intended to give a maximum speed of 27 knots (50 km/h; 31 mph). The destroyers carried enough fuel to give them a range of 3,000 nautical miles (5,600 km; 3,500 mi) at 15 knots (28 km/h; 17 mph).

The Catamarca's armament consisted of four 4-inch (102 mm) guns on single mounts; one on the forecastle, another between the center and aft funnels and the remaining pair fore and aft of the rear superstructure. They were also equipped with four single 21-inch (533 mm) torpedo tubes on rotating mounts, two on each broadside. The ships' complement consisted of 150 officers and men.

== Construction and career ==
Named after Jujuy Province, the ship was ordered from the Friedrich Krupp Germaniawerft shipyard in Kiel, Germany, in 1910 because Argentina could not build warships of that size itself and was launched on 4 March 1912. She was turned over to the Argentine Navy and commissioned on 15 April 1912. Jujuy arrived in Buenos Aires on 5 July and was tasked the following year to train crewmen for the two Rivadavia-class battleships then under construction in the United States as part of the Training Division. The ship visited Mar del Plata in February 1914 and Montevideo, Uruguay, in August 1915 before beginning a refit at the end of the year.

Like her sister ship Catamarca, Jujuy spent 1917 virtually in reserve due to the nationwide shortage of coal, but unlike her sister, Jujuy was disarmed and placed in reserve during 1918–1919. The ship was assigned to the Scout Group (Grupo de Exploradores) upon her reactivation in 1920 and joined the group on visits to the river ports of Paraná, Entre Ríos, and Concepción del Uruguay in commemoration of General Justo José de Urquiza. She was assigned to the 1st Division in 1921 and was reclassified as a Scout-Torpedo Boat (Explorador-Torpedero) the following year. Jujuy visited Buenos Aires to celebrate President Marcelo Torcuato de Alvear's inauguration on 12 October 1922.

The ship was assigned to the Training Division of the Torpedo Boat Group in 1923, although she was briefly reduced to reserve in October. Upon her reactivation the following year, Jujuy was assigned to the School Ships Division and participated in the naval review at Buenos Aires for Umberto, the Prince of Piedmont, in 1924. She was temporarily assigned to the Scout Group between February and December 1925, during which time Jujuy ferried the Uruguayan Ambassador to Montevideo in June, and visited San Nicolás de los Arroyos on 7 July. While conducting gunnery training at the end of July, a gun burst, causing an unknown number of casualties. In 1926, the ship was again temporarily assigned to the Scout Group, although her activities were limited by a coal miner's strike in Britain. In July, the destroyer visited Necochea and trained with the battleship Rivadavia in the waters off Puerto Belgrano and in the Golfo Nuevo in October–November. The ship rejoined the Scout Group for training in January–May 1927, before being disarmed and placed in reserve for her lengthy modernization. Her boilers were converted to use fuel oil and her coal bunkers were exchanged for oil tanks. The amidships four-inch gun was removed and a pair of 37-millimeter (1.5 in) anti-aircraft guns were installed.

The ship's sea trials were conducted in 1931 and she was reclassified as a destroyer. Jujuy was assigned to the Scout Squadron in 1932 for training and then to the 2nd Scout Squadron during 1933–1935. She was transferred to the 2nd Squadron of Scout-Torpedo Boats in 1936, training in the South Atlantic, the Golfo Nuevo and San Matías Gulf. Based at Puerto Belgrano Naval Base through 1940, the ship continued training in those areas, making port visits to Ingeniero White in May and then Buenos Aires in July 1939. Two years later Jujuy was briefly transferred to Santa Fe before being assigned to the Torpedo Boat Division of the River Squadron and based at the Río Santiago Naval Base at Ensenada in 1942. The ship continued to train in the Río de la Plata through 1946 when she was evaluated as obsolete and was placed in reserve the following year. The destroyer was cannibalized for spare parts over the next decade. She was stricken on 10 January 1956 and was sold for scrap in 1960 for m$n 1.2 million.

== Sources ==
- Arguindeguy, Pablo E. (1972). Apuntes sobre los buques de la Armada Argentina (1810–1970) [Notes on the Ships of the Argentine Navy (1810–1970)] (in Spanish). Buenos Aires: Comando en Jefe de la Armada. OCLC 5730374.
- Scheina, Robert L. (1985). "Argentina". In Gray, Randal (ed.). Conway's All the World's Fighting Ships 1906–1921. Annapolis, Maryland: Naval Institute Press. pp. 400–403. ISBN 0-85177-245-5.
