= ARA Santa Fe (1896) =

Argentine destroyer

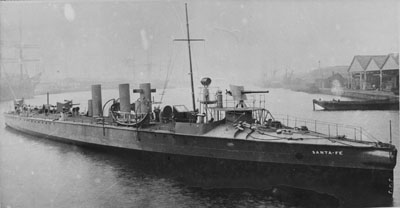
- Santa Fe in 1896

History

Argentina
- Name: Santa Fe
- Namesake: Santa Fe Province
- Owner: Ottoman Navy
- Ordered: 1896
- Builder: Yarrow Shipbuilders, Glasgow
- Cost: £37,000
- Completed: 1896
- Fate: Sunk, 1908

General characteristics
- Type: Corrientes-class destroyer
- Displacement: Normal: 240 long tons (244 t); Full load: 280 long tons (284 t)
- Length: 190 feet 0 inches (57.9 m)
- Beam: 19 feet 6 inches (5.94 m)
- Draft: 7 feet 4 inches (2.23 m) (mean)
- Installed power: 4,200 indicated horsepower (3,100 kW)
- Propulsion: 2 × triple-expansion steam engines; 6 × water-tube boilers; 2 propellers
- Speed: 27 knots (50 km/h; 31 mph)
- Complement: 54
- Armament: 1 × 3 in (76 mm) gun; 3 × 3-pounder guns; 3 × 18 in (457 mm) torpedo tubes
- Armor: 0.5 in (13 mm)–0.8 in (20 mm) steel belt

ARA Santa Fe was a Corrientes-class torpedo boat destroyer operated by the Argentine Navy. Built in 1896 in the United Kingdom, the ship was in service for less than a year before she was wrecked in the Rio de la Plata.

== Development and design ==
During the 1890s, the Argentine Navy modernized and enlarged as tensions with Chile over a border dispute grew. Many of the new ships were ordered from British shipyards, who had been building Argentine warships for decades. In 1896, an order was placed with Yarrow Shipbuilders to build four Corrientes-class torpedo boat destroyers at a price of £37,000 per ship. The destroyers had a length between perpendiculars of 190 feet 0 inches (57.9 m), with a beam of 19 feet 6 inches (5.94 m) and a mean draught of 7 feet 4 inches (2.23 m). They displaced 240 long tons (244 t) at normal load and 280 long tons (284 t) at full load, and carried a complement of 54. Propulsion was provided by two propellers powered by triple-expansion steam engines supplied by six Yarrow water-tube boilers, which produced 4,200 indicated horsepower (3,100 kW) and gave the ships a maximum speed of 27 knots (50 km/h; 31 mph). The destroyers carried approximately 80 long tons (81 t) of coal. Their boilers and machinery were protected by belt armour that ranged from 0.5 in (13 mm) to 0.8 in (20 mm) in thickness. The 3 in (76 mm) quick firing gun was mounted on the bow with three 3-pounder guns mounted on the centerline aft. A 18 in (457 mm) torpedo tube was fixed on the bow and a further two were on trainable mounts aft. The design also featured a turtledeck forecastle and three unevenly located funnels.

== Service history ==
Built in 1896 and named Santa Fe after the Argentine province, the Corrientes-class destroyer was crewed by British sailors on her trans-Atlantic voyage to Argentina. Later that year, she was assigned to patrol the Rio de la Plata between Buenos Aires and Colonia del Sacramento. On 19 April 1897, she was near the latter city in a storm and struck a reef. The ship broke in two, and the entire crew was rescued due to the nearby shore and assistance from USS Yantic. Parts of the ship were salvaged and brought to Tigre, Buenos Aires to serve as spart parts. Salvaged parts of her hull were sold for scrap, and one engine was incorporated onto ARA Uruguay when the gunboat was refitted for Antarctic operations in 1903.
