= Banquereau =

Ocean bank in Nova Scotia

Coordinates: 44.535498°N 58.583968°W

Banquereau or Banquereau Bank is an ocean bank in the North Atlantic Ocean southeast of Nova Scotia, Canada.
