= Corrientes-class destroyer =

Argentine destroyer class

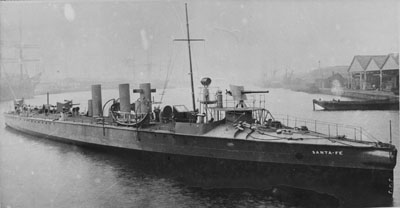
- Santa Fe in 1896

Class overview
- Name: Corrientes class
- Builders: Yarrow Shipbuilders, Glasgow
- Operators: Argentine Navy
- Built: 1896–1898
- In service: ?–1930
- Completed: 4
- Lost: 1
- Scrapped: 3

General characteristics
- Type: Torpedo boat destroyer
- Displacement: Normal: 240 long tons (244 t); Full load: 280 long tons (284 t)
- Length: 190 feet 0 inches (57.9 m)
- Beam: 19 feet 6 inches (5.94 m)
- Draft: 7 feet 4 inches (2.23 m) (mean)
- Installed power: 4,200 indicated horsepower (3,100 kW)
- Propulsion: 2 × triple-expansion steam engines; 6 × water-tube boilers; 2 propellers
- Speed: 27 knots (50 km/h; 31 mph)
- Complement: 54
- Armament: 1 × 3 in (76 mm) gun; 3 × 3-pounder guns; 3 × 18 in (457 mm) torpedo tubes
- Armor: 0.5 in (13 mm)–0.8 in (20 mm) steel belt

The Corrientes-class destroyer was a series of four torpedo boat destroyers operated by the Argentine Navy in the early 20th century. Ordered in 1896 due to high tensions with Chile, the ships were completed by 1898. ARA Santa Fe sank in 1897, and the rest of the class remained in service until 1930.

== Development and design ==
During the 1890s, the Argentine Navy modernized and enlarged as tensions with Chile over a border dispute grew. Many of the new ships were ordered from British shipyards, who had been building Argentine warships for decades. Yarrow Shipbuilders built four torpedo boat destroyers between 1896 and 1898, known as the Corrientes-class. Unlike the shipyard's other exported 27 knots (50 km/h; 31 mph) torpedo boat destroyers, they featured one less boiler room and were ordered in 1896. The destroyers had a length between perpendiculars of 190 feet 0 inches (57.9 m), with a beam of 19 feet 6 inches (5.94 m) and a mean draught of 7 feet 4 inches (2.23 m). They displaced 240 long tons (244 t) at normal load and 280 long tons (284 t) at full load, and carried a complement of 54. Propulsion was provided by two propellers powered by triple-expansion steam engines supplied by six Yarrow water-tube boilers, which produced 4,200 indicated horsepower (3,100 kW) and gave the ships a maximum speed of 27 knots (50 km/h; 31 mph). The destroyers carried approximately 80 long tons (81 t) of coal. Their boilers and machinery were protected by belt armour that ranged from 0.5 in (13 mm) to 0.8 in (20 mm) in thickness. The 3 in (76 mm) quick firing gun was mounted on the bow with three 3-pounder guns mounted on the centerline aft. A 18 in (457 mm) torpedo tube was fixed on the bow and a further two were on trainable mounts aft. The design also featured a turtledeck forecastle and three unevenly located funnels. Yarrow used the design as the basis for the Ikazuchi-class, the first destroyers built for Japan.

== Service history ==
Once in service, the destroyers had issues reaching and maintaining their top speed. On 19 April 1897, Santa Fe struck a reef and broke in two. The ship sank, but the crew was rescued by USS Yantic. The remaining three ships—Corrientes, Misiones, and Entre Rios—remained in service and were decommissioned on 23 October 1930.

== Ships in class ==
Data
Name	Launched	Fate
ARA Corrientes	1896	Decommissioned, 23 October 1930
ARA Misiones	1897	Decommissioned, 23 October 1930
ARA Entre Rios	1896	Decommissioned, 23 October 1930
ARA Santa Fe	1896	Sunk, 19 April 1897
